= List of Michelin-starred restaurants in the Netherlands =

The Michelin Guides have been published by the French tire company Michelin since 1900. They were designed as a guide to tell drivers about eateries they recommended to visit and to subtly sponsor their tires, by encouraging drivers to use their cars more and therefore need to replace the tires as they wore out. Over time, the stars that were given out started to become more valuable.

Multiple anonymous Michelin inspectors visit the restaurants several times. They rate the restaurants on five criteria: "quality of products", "mastery of flavor and cooking techniques", "the personality of the chef represented in the dining experience", "value for money", and "consistency between inspectors' visits". Inspectors have at least ten years of expertise and create a list of popular restaurants supported by media reports, reviews, and diner popularity. If they reach a consensus, Michelin awards restaurants from one to three stars based on its evaluation methodology: One star means "high-quality cooking, worth a stop", two stars signify "excellent cooking, worth a detour", and three stars denote "exceptional cuisine, worth a special journey". The stars are not permanent and restaurants are constantly being re-evaluated. If the criteria are not met, the restaurant will lose its stars.

The Michelin Guide has been reviewing the Netherlands since 1926.

== 2021–2026 ==
Key
1 Michelin star	One Michelin star
2 Michelin stars	Two Michelin stars
3 Michelin stars	Three Michelin stars
—	The restaurant did not receive a star that year
Closed	The restaurant is no longer open

Michelin-starred restaurants
Name	Cuisine	Location	2021	2022	2023	2024	2025	2026
Herberg Onder de Linden	Asian	Aduard	1 Michelin star	1 Michelin star	1 Michelin star	1 Michelin star	1 Michelin star	1 Michelin star
Aan de Poel	Creative	Amstelveen	2 Michelin stars	2 Michelin stars	2 Michelin stars	2 Michelin stars	2 Michelin stars	2 Michelin stars
Lastage	Creative	Amsterdam	1 Michelin star	1 Michelin star	—	—	—	—
Vermeer	French	Amsterdam	1 Michelin star	—	—	—	—	—
Vinkeles	Creative	Amsterdam	1 Michelin star	1 Michelin star	2 Michelin stars	2 Michelin stars	2 Michelin stars	2 Michelin stars
Ciel Bleu	Creative	Amsterdam	2 Michelin stars	2 Michelin stars	2 Michelin stars	2 Michelin stars	2 Michelin stars	2 Michelin stars
Yamazato	Japanese	Amsterdam	1 Michelin star	1 Michelin star	1 Michelin star	1 Michelin star	1 Michelin star	1 Michelin star
Le Restaurant	Market	Amsterdam	1 Michelin star	1 Michelin star	1 Michelin star	Closed		
RON Gastrobar	French	Amsterdam	1 Michelin star	1 Michelin star	1 Michelin star	1 Michelin star	1 Michelin star	1 Michelin star
Bord'Eau	Creative	Amsterdam	1 Michelin star	—	—	Closed		
Spectrum (formerly "Librije's Zusje")	Creative	Amsterdam	2 Michelin stars	2 Michelin stars	2 Michelin stars	2 Michelin stars	2 Michelin stars	Closed
Sinne	Modern	Amsterdam	1 Michelin star	1 Michelin star	1 Michelin star	1 Michelin star	1 Michelin star	1 Michelin star
The Duchess	French	Amsterdam	1 Michelin star	1 Michelin star	1 Michelin star	—	—	—
The White Room	Modern	Amsterdam	1 Michelin star	1 Michelin star	1 Michelin star	1 Michelin star	1 Michelin star	1 Michelin star
Bougainville	Modern	Amsterdam	1 Michelin star	1 Michelin star	1 Michelin star	1 Michelin star	1 Michelin star	1 Michelin star
Restaurant 212	Creative	Amsterdam	2 Michelin stars	2 Michelin stars	2 Michelin stars	2 Michelin stars	2 Michelin stars	2 Michelin stars
Bolenius	Modern	Amsterdam	1 Michelin star	1 Michelin star	1 Michelin star	1 Michelin star	1 Michelin star	1 Michelin star
Mos	French	Amsterdam	1 Michelin star	1 Michelin star	1 Michelin star	1 Michelin star	1 Michelin star	1 Michelin star
RIJKS®	Creative	Amsterdam	1 Michelin star	1 Michelin star	1 Michelin star	1 Michelin star	1 Michelin star	1 Michelin star
Graphite	Creative	Amsterdam	1 Michelin star	1 Michelin star	1 Michelin star	Closed		
De Heeren van Harinxma	French	Beetsterzwaag	1 Michelin star	1 Michelin star	1 Michelin star	1 Michelin star	1 Michelin star	1 Michelin star
Het Koetshuis	Modern	Bennekom	1 Michelin star	1 Michelin star	1 Michelin star	1 Michelin star	—	—
Kaatje bij de Sluis	Organic	Blokzijl	1 Michelin star	1 Michelin star	1 Michelin star	1 Michelin star	1 Michelin star	1 Michelin star
Wolfslaar	French	Breda	1 Michelin star	1 Michelin star	1 Michelin star	1 Michelin star	1 Michelin star	1 Michelin star
De Kromme Watergang	Country	Breskens	2 Michelin stars	2 Michelin stars	2 Michelin stars	1 Michelin star	1 Michelin star	1 Michelin star
Spetters	Farm to table	Breskens	1 Michelin star	1 Michelin star	1 Michelin star	1 Michelin star	1 Michelin star	1 Michelin star
Soigné	French	Bussum	1 Michelin star	—	—	—	—	—
AIRrepublic		Cadzand	1 Michelin star	1 Michelin star	1 Michelin star	Closed		
Pure C		Cadzand-Bad	2 Michelin stars	2 Michelin stars	Closed			
Perceel	Creative	Capelle aan den IJssel	1 Michelin star	1 Michelin star	1 Michelin star	1 Michelin star	1 Michelin star	1 Michelin star
Apicius	Modern	Castricum	1 Michelin star	1 Michelin star	1 Michelin star	1 Michelin star	1 Michelin star	1 Michelin star
Nami (formerly Noble Kitchen)	Modern	Cromvoirt	1 Michelin star	1 Michelin star	1 Michelin star	1 Michelin star	1 Michelin star	1 Michelin star
Calla's	French	The Hague	1 Michelin star	1 Michelin star	1 Michelin star	1 Michelin star	1 Michelin star	1 Michelin star
Rijnzicht	Modern	Doornenburg	1 Michelin star	1 Michelin star	1 Michelin star	1 Michelin star	1 Michelin star	1 Michelin star
La Provence	French	Driebergen-Rijsenburg	1 Michelin star	1 Michelin star	1 Michelin star	1 Michelin star	1 Michelin star	1 Michelin star
't Raedthuys	French	Duiven	1 Michelin star	1 Michelin star	1 Michelin star	1 Michelin star	1 Michelin star	1 Michelin star
Wiesen	French	Eindhoven	1 Michelin star	1 Michelin star	1 Michelin star	1 Michelin star	1 Michelin star	1 Michelin star
Zarzo	Creative	Eindhoven	1 Michelin star	1 Michelin star	1 Michelin star	1 Michelin star	1 Michelin star	1 Michelin star
De Lindenhof	Creative	Giethoorn	2 Michelin stars	2 Michelin stars	2 Michelin stars	2 Michelin stars	2 Michelin stars	2 Michelin stars
ML	Creative	Haarlem	1 Michelin star	1 Michelin star	1 Michelin star	1 Michelin star	1 Michelin star	1 Michelin star
Ratatouille Food & Wine	Modern	Haarlem	1 Michelin star	1 Michelin star	1 Michelin star	1 Michelin star	1 Michelin star	1 Michelin star
Olivijn		Haarlem	1 Michelin star	1 Michelin star	1 Michelin star	Closed		
Cheval Blanc	Modern	Heemstede	1 Michelin star	1 Michelin star	1 Michelin star	1 Michelin star	1 Michelin star	1 Michelin star
Basiliek	Modern	Harderwijk	1 Michelin star	—	1 Michelin star	1 Michelin star	1 Michelin star	1 Michelin star
't Nonnetje	Creative	Harderwijk	2 Michelin stars	2 Michelin stars	2 Michelin stars	2 Michelin stars	2 Michelin stars	2 Michelin stars
De Kromme Dissel	French	Heelsum	1 Michelin star	1 Michelin star	1 Michelin star	1 Michelin star	1 Michelin star	1 Michelin star
Tribeca	Creative	Heeze	2 Michelin stars	2 Michelin stars	2 Michelin stars	2 Michelin stars	2 Michelin stars	2 Michelin stars
De Rozario		Helmond	1 Michelin star	1 Michelin star	1 Michelin star	—	Closed	
't Lansink	Modern	Hengelo	1 Michelin star	1 Michelin star	1 Michelin star	1 Michelin star	1 Michelin star	1 Michelin star
De Swarte Ruijter	Modern	Holten	1 Michelin star	1 Michelin star	1 Michelin star	1 Michelin star	1 Michelin star	1 Michelin star
Flicka		Kerkdriel	1 Michelin star	1 Michelin star	1 Michelin star	1 Michelin star	1 Michelin star	Closed
't Vlasbloemeken		Koewacht	1 Michelin star	1 Michelin star	1 Michelin star	1 Michelin star	—	Closed
Inter Scaldes	Modern	Kruiningen	3 Michelin stars	3 Michelin stars	3 Michelin stars	2 Michelin stars	2 Michelin stars	2 Michelin stars
Voltaire	Creative	Leersum	1 Michelin star	1 Michelin star	1 Michelin star	1 Michelin star	1 Michelin star	1 Michelin star
Het Roode Koper	Modern	Leuvenum	1 Michelin star	1 Michelin star	—	—	—	—
Tante Koosje	French	Loenen aan de Vecht	1 Michelin star	1 Michelin star	1 Michelin star	1 Michelin star	1 Michelin star	1 Michelin star
't Amsterdammertje	Creative	Loenen aan de Vecht	1 Michelin star	1 Michelin star	1 Michelin star	1 Michelin star	1 Michelin star	1 Michelin star
De Bloemenbeek	French	De Lutte	1 Michelin star	1 Michelin star	1 Michelin star	1 Michelin star	1 Michelin star	1 Michelin star
Da Vinci	French	Maasbracht	1 Michelin star	1 Michelin star	1 Michelin star	1 Michelin star	1 Michelin star	—
Tout à Fait	French	Maastricht	1 Michelin star	1 Michelin star	1 Michelin star	1 Michelin star	1 Michelin star	1 Michelin star
Rantree		Maastricht	1 Michelin star	1 Michelin star	1 Michelin star	—	—	Closed
Beluga loves you	Creative	Maastricht	1 Michelin star	1 Michelin star	1 Michelin star	1 Michelin star	1 Michelin star	1 Michelin star
Posthoorn		Monnickendam	1 Michelin star	—	—	—	—	—
De Burgemeester	Modern	Linschoten	1 Michelin star	1 Michelin star	1 Michelin star	1 Michelin star	1 Michelin star	1 Michelin star
De Gieser Wildeman	French	Noordeloos	1 Michelin star	1 Michelin star	1 Michelin star	1 Michelin star	1 Michelin star	1 Michelin star
Latour	Modern	Noordwijk aan Zee	1 Michelin star	1 Michelin star	1 Michelin star	1 Michelin star	1 Michelin star	1 Michelin star
De Lindehof	Creative	Nuenen	2 Michelin stars	2 Michelin stars	2 Michelin stars	2 Michelin stars	Closed	
Zout & Citroen	Creative	Oosterhout	1 Michelin star	1 Michelin star	1 Michelin star	1 Michelin star	1 Michelin star	1 Michelin star
De Bokkedoorns	Modern	Overveen	2 Michelin stars	2 Michelin stars	2 Michelin stars	2 Michelin stars	2 Michelin stars	2 Michelin stars
Versaen	Creative	Ravenstein	1 Michelin star	1 Michelin star	1 Michelin star	1 Michelin star	1 Michelin star	1 Michelin star
One	Creative	Roermond	1 Michelin star	1 Michelin star	1 Michelin star	1 Michelin star	1 Michelin star	1 Michelin star
Sabero	Asian	Roermond	2 Michelin stars	2 Michelin stars	—	1 Michelin star	1 Michelin star	1 Michelin star
FG (formerly "Ivy")	Creative	Rotterdam	2 Michelin stars	2 Michelin stars	2 Michelin stars	2 Michelin stars	2 Michelin stars	2 Michelin stars
Parkheuvel	Modern	Rotterdam	2 Michelin stars	2 Michelin stars	2 Michelin stars	2 Michelin stars	2 Michelin stars	2 Michelin stars
Amarone	French	Rotterdam	1 Michelin star	1 Michelin star	1 Michelin star	1 Michelin star	1 Michelin star	1 Michelin star
Fred	French	Rotterdam	2 Michelin stars	2 Michelin stars	2 Michelin stars	2 Michelin stars	2 Michelin stars	2 Michelin stars
FG Food Labs	Creative	Rotterdam	1 Michelin star	1 Michelin star	1 Michelin star	—	—	—
Joelia	French	Rotterdam	1 Michelin star	1 Michelin star	1 Michelin star	1 Michelin star	1 Michelin star	1 Michelin star
Fitzgerald	French	Rotterdam	1 Michelin star	1 Michelin star	1 Michelin star	1 Michelin star	Closed	Closed
The Millèn	Modern	Rotterdam	1 Michelin star	1 Michelin star	1 Michelin star	1 Michelin star	1 Michelin star	1 Michelin star
Noble		Den Bosch	1 Michelin star	1 Michelin star	—	—	—	—
Sense	Creative	Den Bosch	1 Michelin star	1 Michelin star	1 Michelin star	1 Michelin star	1 Michelin star	—
De Loohoeve		Schoonloo	1 Michelin star	—	—	—	—	—
Merlet	Modern	Schoorl	1 Michelin star	1 Michelin star	1 Michelin star	1 Michelin star	1 Michelin star	1 Michelin star
Wollerich		Sint-Oedenrode	1 Michelin star	1 Michelin star	—	Closed		
Monarh	Creative	Tilburg	1 Michelin star	1 Michelin star	1 Michelin star	1 Michelin star	1 Michelin star	1 Michelin star
De Leuf	Creative	Ubachsberg	1 Michelin star	1 Michelin star	1 Michelin star	1 Michelin star	1 Michelin star	1 Michelin star
Oonivoo		Uden	1 Michelin star	—	—	—	—	—
Eden	Modern	Valkenswaard	1 Michelin star	1 Michelin star	1 Michelin star	1 Michelin star	—	—
Valuas	French	Venlo	1 Michelin star	—	—	—	—	—
De Nederlanden		Vreeland	1 Michelin star	1 Michelin star	1 Michelin star	1 Michelin star	1 Michelin star	1 Michelin star
De Treeswijkhoeve	Creative	Waalre	2 Michelin stars	2 Michelin stars	2 Michelin stars	2 Michelin stars	2 Michelin stars	2 Michelin stars
Bij Jef	Regional cuisine	Den Hoorn	1 Michelin star	1 Michelin star	1 Michelin star	1 Michelin star	1 Michelin star	1 Michelin star
De Moerbei	French	Warmond	1 Michelin star	1 Michelin star	1 Michelin star	1 Michelin star	1 Michelin star	1 Michelin star
Marrees	Modern	Weert	1 Michelin star	1 Michelin star	1 Michelin star	1 Michelin star	1 Michelin star	1 Michelin star
Brienen aan de Maas		Well	1 Michelin star	1 Michelin star	1 Michelin star	1 Michelin star	—	—
Katseveer	Modern	Wilhelminadorp	1 Michelin star	1 Michelin star	—	—	—	—
O&O	Asian	Sint Willebrord	1 Michelin star	1 Michelin star	1 Michelin star	1 Michelin star	1 Michelin star	1 Michelin star
Vista	French	Willemstad	1 Michelin star	1 Michelin star	1 Michelin star	1 Michelin star	1 Michelin star	1 Michelin star
Mijn Keuken		Wouw	1 Michelin star	1 Michelin star	—	Closed		
De Vlindertuin	French	Zuidlaren	1 Michelin star	1 Michelin star	1 Michelin star	1 Michelin star	1 Michelin star	1 Michelin star
De Groene Lantaarn	French	Zuidwolde	2 Michelin stars	2 Michelin stars	2 Michelin stars	2 Michelin stars	2 Michelin stars	2 Michelin stars
Aan de Zweth	French	Zweth	1 Michelin star	1 Michelin star	1 Michelin star	1 Michelin star	—	—
Brut172	Creative	Reijmerstok	2 Michelin stars	2 Michelin stars	2 Michelin stars	2 Michelin stars	2 Michelin stars	2 Michelin stars
De Librije	Modern	Zwolle	3 Michelin stars	3 Michelin stars	3 Michelin stars	3 Michelin stars	3 Michelin stars	3 Michelin stars
Wils	World	Amsterdam	1 Michelin star	1 Michelin star	1 Michelin star	1 Michelin star	1 Michelin star	1 Michelin star
Daalder		Amsterdam	1 Michelin star	1 Michelin star	1 Michelin star	1 Michelin star	1 Michelin star	—
De Nieuwe Winkel	Organic	Nijmegen	1 Michelin star	2 Michelin stars	2 Michelin stars	2 Michelin stars	2 Michelin stars	2 Michelin stars
Pieters Restaurant	French	Bergambacht	1 Michelin star	1 Michelin star	1 Michelin star	1 Michelin star	1 Michelin star	1 Michelin star
Zeezout	Seafood	Rotterdam	1 Michelin star	1 Michelin star	1 Michelin star	1 Michelin star	1 Michelin star	1 Michelin star
Tilia	Modern	Etten-Leur	1 Michelin star	1 Michelin star	—	Closed		
Meliefste		Wolphaartsdijk	1 Michelin star	1 Michelin star	1 Michelin star	1 Michelin star	Closed	
Kasteel Heemstede	Modern	Houten	1 Michelin star	1 Michelin star	1 Michelin star	1 Michelin star	1 Michelin star	1 Michelin star
Flore	Contemporary	Amsterdam	—	2 Michelin stars	2 Michelin stars	2 Michelin stars	2 Michelin stars	2 Michelin stars
Julemont		Wittem	—	2 Michelin stars	2 Michelin stars	Closed		
De Juwelier	French	Amsterdam	—	1 Michelin star	1 Michelin star	1 Michelin star	1 Michelin star	—
Zoldering	French	Amsterdam	—	1 Michelin star	1 Michelin star	1 Michelin star	1 Michelin star	1 Michelin star
Lars Amsterdam	Modern	Amsterdam	—	1 Michelin star	1 Michelin star	1 Michelin star	1 Michelin star	1 Michelin star
Vigor		Vught	—	1 Michelin star	1 Michelin star	Closed		
Alma	French	Oisterwijk	—	1 Michelin star	1 Michelin star	1 Michelin star	1 Michelin star	1 Michelin star
’t Ganzenest	French	Rijswijk	—	1 Michelin star	1 Michelin star	1 Michelin star	1 Michelin star	1 Michelin star
Atelier		Gulpen	—	1 Michelin star	1 Michelin star	1 Michelin star	1 Michelin star	1 Michelin star
Cas Pikaar		Hilvarenbeek	—	1 Michelin star	1 Michelin star	1 Michelin star	—	—
Noor	Creative	Hoogkerk	—	1 Michelin star	1 Michelin star	1 Michelin star	1 Michelin star	1 Michelin star
Karel 5	Creative	Utrecht	—	—	1 Michelin star	1 Michelin star	1 Michelin star	1 Michelin star
Chateau Neercanne	French	Maastricht	—	—	1 Michelin star	1 Michelin star	1 Michelin star	1 Michelin star
VanderVeen		Amsterdam	—	—	1 Michelin star	Closed		
Lizz	French	Gouda	—	—	1 Michelin star	1 Michelin star	1 Michelin star	1 Michelin star
Flavours		Weert	—	—	1 Michelin star	1 Michelin star	—	—
Brass Boer Thuis	Regional	Zwolle	—	—	1 Michelin star	1 Michelin star	1 Michelin star	1 Michelin star
Bistro de la Mer	Classic	Amsterdam	—	—	1 Michelin star	1 Michelin star	1 Michelin star	1 Michelin star
Central Park	Modern	Voorburg	—	—	1 Michelin star	1 Michelin star	1 Michelin star	1 Michelin star
Restaurant Smink	Creative	Wolvega	—	—	1 Michelin star	1 Michelin star	1 Michelin star	1 Michelin star
Studio	Asian	Maastricht	—	—	1 Michelin star	1 Michelin star	1 Michelin star	1 Michelin star
Maeve	French	Utrecht	—	—	1 Michelin star	1 Michelin star	1 Michelin star	1 Michelin star
Coulisse		Amsterdam	—	—	1 Michelin star	1 Michelin star	—	—
Codium	Creative	Goes	—	—	1 Michelin star	1 Michelin star	1 Michelin star	1 Michelin star
De Woage	Farm to table	Gramsbergen	—	—	1 Michelin star	1 Michelin star	1 Michelin star	—
Yama		Rotterdam	—	—	1 Michelin star	Closed		
Au Coin des Bon Enfants	French	Maastricht	—	—	1 Michelin star	1 Michelin star	1 Michelin star	1 Michelin star
Triptyque	Creative	Wateringen	—	—	—	1 Michelin star	1 Michelin star	1 Michelin star
Lutum	Creative	Wijk bij Duurstede	—	—	—	1 Michelin star	1 Michelin star	1 Michelin star
Demain		Zeeland	—	—	—	1 Michelin star	1 Michelin star	—
Zenith	Modern	Apeldoorn	—	—	—	1 Michelin star	1 Michelin star	1 Michelin star
Restaurant Affect	Modern	Zwolle	—	—	—	1 Michelin star	1 Michelin star	1 Michelin star
Restaurant 1857	French	Roosendaal	—	—	—	1 Michelin star	1 Michelin star	1 Michelin star
Odille	Modern	Sint-Oedenrode	—	—	—	1 Michelin star	1 Michelin star	1 Michelin star
Restaurant Showw	Modern	Amsterdam	—	—	—	1 Michelin star	1 Michelin star	1 Michelin star
Joann	Creative	Enschede	—	—	—	1 Michelin star	1 Michelin star	1 Michelin star
De Kas	Organic	Amsterdam	—	1 Michelin star	1 Michelin star	1 Michelin star	1 Michelin star	1 Michelin star
Nassau	Modern	Groningen	—	—	—	—	—	1 Michelin star
Le Epifaan	Creative	Veeningen	—	—	—	—	—	1 Michelin star
Wild Atelier	Modern	Hoog Soeren	—	—	—	—	—	1 Michelin star
Choux	French	Amsterdam	—	—	—	—	1 Michelin star	1 Michelin star
Create	Modern	Eijsden	—	—	—	—	2 Michelin stars	2 Michelin stars
GEM.	Creative	Gemert	—	—	—	—	2 Michelin stars	2 Michelin stars
CUE	Creative	Amsterdam	—	—	—	—	1 Michelin star	1 Michelin star
Bij Signey	Creative	Loenen aan de Vecht	—	—	—	—	—	1 Michelin star
Azurite	Modern	Delft	—	—	—	—	—	2 Michelin stars
Suis	Creative	Schin op Geul	—	—	—	—	—	2 Michelin stars
Olde Marckt	Modern	Aalten	—	—	—	—	1 Michelin star	1 Michelin star
Ambrozijn	Modern	Valkenburg	—	—	—	—	—	1 Michelin star
De Cuijt	Creative	Mierlo	—	—	—	—	—	1 Michelin star
Rozewied	Market	Kortgene	—	—	—	—	—	1 Michelin star
Novaela	Creative	Delft	—	—	—	—	1 Michelin star	1 Michelin star
Restaurant Calva	Modern	Nootdorp	—	—	—	—	1 Michelin star	1 Michelin star
Reference								

== 2011–2020 ==
Key
1 Michelin star	One Michelin star
2 Michelin stars	Two Michelin stars
3 Michelin stars	Three Michelin stars
—	The restaurant did not receive a star that year
Closed	The restaurant is no longer open

Michelin-starred restaurants
Name	Location	2011	2012	2013	2014	2015	2016	2017	2018	2019	2020
De Fuik	Aalst	1 Michelin star	—	—	—	—	—	—	—	—	—
Herberg Onder de Linden	Aduard	1 Michelin star	1 Michelin star	1 Michelin star	1 Michelin star	1 Michelin star	1 Michelin star	1 Michelin star	1 Michelin star	1 Michelin star	1 Michelin star
De Saffraan	Amersfoort	1 Michelin star	1 Michelin star	1 Michelin star	1 Michelin star	—	—	—	—	—	—
Blok's Restaurant	Amersfoort	—	—	1 Michelin star	1 Michelin star	1 Michelin star	1 Michelin star	1 Michelin star	1 Michelin star	1 Michelin star	Closed
Aan de Poel	Amstelveen	1 Michelin star	1 Michelin star	2 Michelin stars	2 Michelin stars	2 Michelin stars	2 Michelin stars	2 Michelin stars	2 Michelin stars	2 Michelin stars	2 Michelin stars
La Rive	Amsterdam	1 Michelin star	1 Michelin star	1 Michelin star	1 Michelin star	1 Michelin star	1 Michelin star	—	—	—	Closed
Lastage	Amsterdam	—	1 Michelin star	1 Michelin star	1 Michelin star	1 Michelin star	1 Michelin star	1 Michelin star	1 Michelin star	1 Michelin star	1 Michelin star
Vermeer	Amsterdam	1 Michelin star	1 Michelin star	1 Michelin star	1 Michelin star	1 Michelin star	1 Michelin star	1 Michelin star	1 Michelin star	1 Michelin star	1 Michelin star
Vinkeles	Amsterdam	1 Michelin star	1 Michelin star	1 Michelin star	1 Michelin star	1 Michelin star	1 Michelin star	1 Michelin star	1 Michelin star	1 Michelin star	1 Michelin star
Ciel Bleu	Amsterdam	2 Michelin stars	2 Michelin stars	2 Michelin stars	2 Michelin stars	2 Michelin stars	2 Michelin stars	2 Michelin stars	2 Michelin stars	2 Michelin stars	2 Michelin stars
Yamazato	Amsterdam	1 Michelin star	1 Michelin star	1 Michelin star	1 Michelin star	1 Michelin star	1 Michelin star	1 Michelin star	1 Michelin star	1 Michelin star	1 Michelin star
Le Restaurant	Amsterdam	1 Michelin star	1 Michelin star	1 Michelin star	1 Michelin star	1 Michelin star	1 Michelin star	—	1 Michelin star	1 Michelin star	1 Michelin star
Ron Blaauw	Amsterdam	2 Michelin stars	2 Michelin stars	2 Michelin stars	Closed						
RON Gastrobar	Amsterdam	—	—	—	1 Michelin star	1 Michelin star	1 Michelin star	1 Michelin star	1 Michelin star	1 Michelin star	1 Michelin star
&moshik (formerly "&samhoud places")	Amsterdam	—	—	2 Michelin stars	2 Michelin stars	2 Michelin stars	2 Michelin stars	2 Michelin stars	2 Michelin stars	2 Michelin stars	2 Michelin stars
Bord'Eau	Amsterdam	—	—	1 Michelin star	2 Michelin stars	2 Michelin stars	2 Michelin stars	2 Michelin stars	1 Michelin star	1 Michelin star	1 Michelin star
Bridges	Amsterdam	—	—	—	1 Michelin star	1 Michelin star	1 Michelin star	1 Michelin star	1 Michelin star	1 Michelin star	—
Spectrum (formerly "Librije's Zusje")	Amsterdam	—	—	—	—	2 Michelin stars	2 Michelin stars	2 Michelin stars	2 Michelin stars	2 Michelin stars	2 Michelin stars
Sazanka	Amsterdam	—	—	—	—	1 Michelin star	1 Michelin star	1 Michelin star	1 Michelin star	—	—
Sinne	Amsterdam	—	—	—	—	1 Michelin star	1 Michelin star	1 Michelin star	1 Michelin star	1 Michelin star	1 Michelin star
The Duchess	Amsterdam	—	—	—	—	—	—	—	1 Michelin star	1 Michelin star	1 Michelin star
The White Room	Amsterdam	—	—	—	—	—	—	—	1 Michelin star	1 Michelin star	1 Michelin star
Bougainville	Amsterdam	—	—	—	—	—	—	—	—	1 Michelin star	1 Michelin star
Restaurant 212	Amsterdam	—	—	—	—	—	—	—	—	1 Michelin star	1 Michelin star
Bolenius	Amsterdam	—	—	—	—	—	—	1 Michelin star	1 Michelin star	1 Michelin star	1 Michelin star
Mos	Amsterdam	—	—	—	—	—	—	1 Michelin star	1 Michelin star	1 Michelin star	1 Michelin star
RIJKS®	Amsterdam	—	—	—	—	—	—	1 Michelin star	1 Michelin star	1 Michelin star	1 Michelin star
Graphite by Peter Gast	Amsterdam	—	—	—	—	—	—	—	—	—	1 Michelin star
De Heeren van Harinxma	Beetsterzwaag	—	—	—	—	—	1 Michelin star	1 Michelin star	1 Michelin star	1 Michelin star	1 Michelin star
Het Koetshuis	Bennekom	1 Michelin star	1 Michelin star	1 Michelin star	1 Michelin star	1 Michelin star	1 Michelin star	1 Michelin star	1 Michelin star	1 Michelin star	1 Michelin star
Chapeau!	Bloemendaal	1 Michelin star	2 Michelin stars	2 Michelin stars	2 Michelin stars	2 Michelin stars	2 Michelin stars	Closed			
Kaatje bij de Sluis	Blokzijl	1 Michelin star	1 Michelin star	1 Michelin star	1 Michelin star	1 Michelin star	1 Michelin star	1 Michelin star	1 Michelin star	1 Michelin star	1 Michelin star
De Stenen Tafel	Borculo	1 Michelin star	—	—	—	—	—	—	—	—	—
De Hoefslag	Bosch en Duin	1 Michelin star	1 Michelin star	1 Michelin star	1 Michelin star	1 Michelin star	1 Michelin star	1 Michelin star	1 Michelin star	—	—
Wolfslaar	Breda	1 Michelin star	1 Michelin star	1 Michelin star	1 Michelin star	1 Michelin star	1 Michelin star	1 Michelin star	1 Michelin star	1 Michelin star	1 Michelin star
De Kromme Watergang	Breskens	1 Michelin star	2 Michelin stars	2 Michelin stars	2 Michelin stars	2 Michelin stars	2 Michelin stars	2 Michelin stars	2 Michelin stars	2 Michelin stars	2 Michelin stars
Spetters	Breskens	—	—	—	1 Michelin star	1 Michelin star	1 Michelin star	1 Michelin star	1 Michelin star	1 Michelin star	1 Michelin star
Soigné	Bussum	1 Michelin star	1 Michelin star	1 Michelin star	1 Michelin star	1 Michelin star	1 Michelin star	1 Michelin star	1 Michelin star	1 Michelin star	1 Michelin star
AIRrepublic	Cadzand	—	—	—	—	—	—	—	1 Michelin star	1 Michelin star	1 Michelin star
Pure C	Cadzand-Bad	—	1 Michelin star	1 Michelin star	1 Michelin star	1 Michelin star	1 Michelin star	1 Michelin star	1 Michelin star	2 Michelin stars	2 Michelin stars
Perceel	Capelle aan den IJssel	—	1 Michelin star	1 Michelin star	1 Michelin star	1 Michelin star	1 Michelin star	1 Michelin star	1 Michelin star	1 Michelin star	1 Michelin star
Apicius	Castricum	1 Michelin star	1 Michelin star	1 Michelin star	1 Michelin star	1 Michelin star	1 Michelin star	1 Michelin star	1 Michelin star	1 Michelin star	1 Michelin star
Noble Kitchen	Cromvoirt	—	—	—	—	—	—	—	—	—	1 Michelin star
Calla's	The Hague	1 Michelin star	1 Michelin star	1 Michelin star	1 Michelin star	1 Michelin star	1 Michelin star	1 Michelin star	1 Michelin star	1 Michelin star	1 Michelin star
HanTing Cuisine	The Hague	—	—	1 Michelin star	1 Michelin star	1 Michelin star	1 Michelin star	1 Michelin star	—	Closed	
Rijnzicht	Doornenburg	—	—	—	—	—	—	—	—	1 Michelin star	1 Michelin star
Koriander	Drachten	1 Michelin star	1 Michelin star	1 Michelin star	1 Michelin star	1 Michelin star	1 Michelin star	1 Michelin star	1 Michelin star	—	—
La Provence	Driebergen-Rijsenburg	1 Michelin star	1 Michelin star	1 Michelin star	1 Michelin star	1 Michelin star	1 Michelin star	1 Michelin star	1 Michelin star	1 Michelin star	1 Michelin star
't Raedthuys	Duiven	—	—	—	1 Michelin star	1 Michelin star	1 Michelin star	1 Michelin star	1 Michelin star	1 Michelin star	1 Michelin star
De Karpendonkse Hoeve	Eindhoven	1 Michelin star	1 Michelin star	1 Michelin star	1 Michelin star	1 Michelin star	1 Michelin star	1 Michelin star	1 Michelin star	1 Michelin star	1 Michelin star
Avant-Garde van Groeninge	Eindhoven	1 Michelin star	1 Michelin star	1 Michelin star	1 Michelin star	1 Michelin star	1 Michelin star	1 Michelin star	1 Michelin star	—	—
Wiesen	Eindhoven	—	—	—	—	1 Michelin star	1 Michelin star	1 Michelin star	1 Michelin star	1 Michelin star	1 Michelin star
Zarzo	Eindhoven	—	—	—	—	—	1 Michelin star	1 Michelin star	1 Michelin star	1 Michelin star	1 Michelin star
Sonoy	Emmeloord	1 Michelin star	1 Michelin star	1 Michelin star	Closed						
De Zwaan	Etten-Leur	1 Michelin star	1 Michelin star	1 Michelin star	1 Michelin star	1 Michelin star	1 Michelin star	1 Michelin star	1 Michelin star	1 Michelin star	1 Michelin star
De Lindenhof	Giethoorn	2 Michelin stars	2 Michelin stars	2 Michelin stars	2 Michelin stars	2 Michelin stars	2 Michelin stars	2 Michelin stars	2 Michelin stars	2 Michelin stars	2 Michelin stars
Solo	Gorinchem	1 Michelin star	1 Michelin star	—	Closed						
Muller	Groningen	1 Michelin star	1 Michelin star	—	—	—	—	—	—	—	—
ML	Haarlem	1 Michelin star	1 Michelin star	1 Michelin star	1 Michelin star	1 Michelin star	1 Michelin star	1 Michelin star	1 Michelin star	1 Michelin star	1 Michelin star
Ratatouille Food & Wine	Haarlem	—	—	—	—	1 Michelin star	1 Michelin star	1 Michelin star	1 Michelin star	1 Michelin star	1 Michelin star
Olivijn	Haarlem	—	—	—	—	—	—	—	—	1 Michelin star	1 Michelin star
Cheval Blanc	Heemstede	1 Michelin star	1 Michelin star	1 Michelin star	1 Michelin star	1 Michelin star	1 Michelin star	1 Michelin star	1 Michelin star	1 Michelin star	1 Michelin star
De Bokkepruik	Heemse	1 Michelin star	1 Michelin star	1 Michelin star	1 Michelin star	1 Michelin star	1 Michelin star	1 Michelin star	—	—	—
Basiliek	Harderwijk	1 Michelin star	1 Michelin star	1 Michelin star	1 Michelin star	1 Michelin star	1 Michelin star	1 Michelin star	1 Michelin star	1 Michelin star	1 Michelin star
't Nonnetje	Harderwijk	1 Michelin star	1 Michelin star	1 Michelin star	1 Michelin star	2 Michelin stars	2 Michelin stars	2 Michelin stars	2 Michelin stars	2 Michelin stars	2 Michelin stars
De Kromme Dissel	Heelsum	1 Michelin star	1 Michelin star	1 Michelin star	1 Michelin star	1 Michelin star	1 Michelin star	1 Michelin star	1 Michelin star	1 Michelin star	1 Michelin star
Cucina del Mondo	Heerlen	—	—	—	—	—	—	1 Michelin star	1 Michelin star	—	—
Boreas	Heeze	2 Michelin stars	2 Michelin stars	2 Michelin stars	2 Michelin stars	2 Michelin stars	2 Michelin stars	Closed			
Tribeca	Heeze	—	—	—	—	—	—	2 Michelin stars	2 Michelin stars	2 Michelin stars	2 Michelin stars
De Rozario	Helmond	—	—	—	—	—	—	—	—	1 Michelin star	1 Michelin star
't Lansink	Hengelo	—	—	—	1 Michelin star	1 Michelin star	1 Michelin star	1 Michelin star	1 Michelin star	1 Michelin star	1 Michelin star
Lakes	Hilversum	1 Michelin star	1 Michelin star	1 Michelin star	1 Michelin star	Closed					
De Swarte Ruijter	Holten	—	—	—	—	—	1 Michelin star	1 Michelin star	1 Michelin star	1 Michelin star	1 Michelin star
De Echoput	Hoog Soeren	—	1 Michelin star	1 Michelin star	1 Michelin star	—	—	—	—	—	—
Lucas Rive	Hoorn	—	—	—	1 Michelin star	1 Michelin star	1 Michelin star	1 Michelin star	1 Michelin star	1 Michelin star	1 Michelin star
Kasteel Heemstede	Houten	1 Michelin star	1 Michelin star	1 Michelin star	1 Michelin star	1 Michelin star	1 Michelin star	1 Michelin star	1 Michelin star	1 Michelin star	—
De Molen	Kaatsheuvel	1 Michelin star	1 Michelin star	1 Michelin star	1 Michelin star	—	—	—	—	—	—
Flicka	Kerkdriel	—	—	—	—	—	—	—	—	1 Michelin star	1 Michelin star
't Vlasbloemeken	Koewacht	—	1 Michelin star	1 Michelin star	1 Michelin star	1 Michelin star	1 Michelin star	1 Michelin star	1 Michelin star	1 Michelin star	1 Michelin star
Inter Scaldes	Kruiningen	2 Michelin stars	2 Michelin stars	2 Michelin stars	2 Michelin stars	2 Michelin stars	2 Michelin stars	2 Michelin stars	3 Michelin stars	3 Michelin stars	3 Michelin stars
Schathoes Verhildersum	Leens	1 Michelin star	1 Michelin star	Closed							
Voltaire	Leersum	—	—	—	—	—	—	—	—	1 Michelin star	1 Michelin star
Élevé	Leeuwarden	—	—	—	1 Michelin star	1 Michelin star	1 Michelin star	1 Michelin star	1 Michelin star	—	—
Het Roode Koper	Leuvenum	—	—	—	—	—	1 Michelin star	1 Michelin star	1 Michelin star	1 Michelin star	1 Michelin star
Tante Koosje	Loenen aan de Vecht	1 Michelin star	1 Michelin star	1 Michelin star	1 Michelin star	1 Michelin star	1 Michelin star	1 Michelin star	1 Michelin star	1 Michelin star	1 Michelin star
't Amsterdammertje	Loenen aan de Vecht	1 Michelin star	1 Michelin star	1 Michelin star	1 Michelin star	1 Michelin star	1 Michelin star	1 Michelin star	1 Michelin star	1 Michelin star	1 Michelin star
De Bloemenbeek	De Lutte	—	1 Michelin star	1 Michelin star	1 Michelin star	1 Michelin star	1 Michelin star	1 Michelin star	1 Michelin star	1 Michelin star	1 Michelin star
Da Vinci	Maasbracht	2 Michelin stars	2 Michelin stars	2 Michelin stars	2 Michelin stars	2 Michelin stars	2 Michelin stars	2 Michelin stars	1 Michelin star	1 Michelin star	1 Michelin star
Toine Hermsen	Maastricht	1 Michelin star	1 Michelin star	1 Michelin star	1 Michelin star	—	—	—	—	—	—
Tout à Fait	Maastricht	1 Michelin star	1 Michelin star	1 Michelin star	1 Michelin star	1 Michelin star	1 Michelin star	1 Michelin star	1 Michelin star	1 Michelin star	1 Michelin star
Au Coin des Bons Enfants	Maastricht	1 Michelin star	1 Michelin star	—	—	—	—	—	—	—	—
Beluga / Beluga loves you	Maastricht	2 Michelin stars	2 Michelin stars	2 Michelin stars	2 Michelin stars	2 Michelin stars	2 Michelin stars	2 Michelin stars	2 Michelin stars	2 Michelin stars	—
Château Neercanne	Maastricht	1 Michelin star	1 Michelin star	1 Michelin star	1 Michelin star	1 Michelin star	1 Michelin star	1 Michelin star	1 Michelin star	—	—
Rantree	Maastricht	—	—	—	—	—	—	—	—	—	1 Michelin star
Beluga Loves You	Maastricht	—	—	—	—	—	—	—	—	—	1 Michelin star
Le Marron	Malden	1 Michelin star	1 Michelin star	1 Michelin star	1 Michelin star	Closed					
Posthoorn	Monnickendam	1 Michelin star	1 Michelin star	1 Michelin star	1 Michelin star	1 Michelin star	1 Michelin star	1 Michelin star	1 Michelin star	1 Michelin star	1 Michelin star
De Burgemeester	Linschoten	1 Michelin star	1 Michelin star	1 Michelin star	1 Michelin star	1 Michelin star	1 Michelin star	1 Michelin star	1 Michelin star	1 Michelin star	1 Michelin star
De Gieser Wildeman	Noordeloos	1 Michelin star	1 Michelin star	1 Michelin star	1 Michelin star	1 Michelin star	1 Michelin star	1 Michelin star	1 Michelin star	1 Michelin star	1 Michelin star
Latour	Noordwijk aan Zee	1 Michelin star	1 Michelin star	1 Michelin star	1 Michelin star	1 Michelin star	1 Michelin star	1 Michelin star	1 Michelin star	1 Michelin star	1 Michelin star
De Lindehof	Nuenen	1 Michelin star	1 Michelin star	1 Michelin star	1 Michelin star	2 Michelin stars	2 Michelin stars	2 Michelin stars	2 Michelin stars	2 Michelin stars	2 Michelin stars
In de Molen	Onderdendam	—	—	—	1 Michelin star	1 Michelin star	1 Michelin star	—	—	—	—
Zout & Citroen	Oosterhout	—	—	—	—	—	—	—	—	—	1 Michelin star
De Wanne	Ootmarsum	1 Michelin star	1 Michelin star	1 Michelin star	1 Michelin star	Closed					
Cordial	Oss	1 Michelin star	1 Michelin star	1 Michelin star	1 Michelin star	1 Michelin star	1 Michelin star	1 Michelin star	1 Michelin star	—	—
De Bokkedoorns	Overveen	2 Michelin stars	2 Michelin stars	2 Michelin stars	2 Michelin stars	2 Michelin stars	2 Michelin stars	2 Michelin stars	2 Michelin stars	2 Michelin stars	2 Michelin stars
't Brouwerskolkje	Overveen	2 Michelin stars	2 Michelin stars	Closed							
Versaen	Ravenstein	—	—	—	—	—	—	—	—	—	1 Michelin star
Kaagjesland	Reeuwijk	—	—	1 Michelin star	1 Michelin star	1 Michelin star	1 Michelin star	—	—	—	—
Hermitage	Rijsoord	1 Michelin star	1 Michelin star	1 Michelin star	1 Michelin star	Closed					
One	Roermond	1 Michelin star	1 Michelin star	1 Michelin star	1 Michelin star	1 Michelin star	1 Michelin star	1 Michelin star	1 Michelin star	1 Michelin star	1 Michelin star
Sabero	Roermond		—	—	—	—	—	—	—	2 Michelin stars	2 Michelin stars
FG (formerly "Ivy")	Rotterdam	1 Michelin star	1 Michelin star	1 Michelin star	2 Michelin stars	2 Michelin stars	2 Michelin stars	2 Michelin stars	2 Michelin stars	2 Michelin stars	2 Michelin stars
Parkheuvel	Rotterdam	2 Michelin stars	2 Michelin stars	2 Michelin stars	2 Michelin stars	2 Michelin stars	2 Michelin stars	2 Michelin stars	2 Michelin stars	2 Michelin stars	2 Michelin stars
Amarone	Rotterdam	1 Michelin star	1 Michelin star	1 Michelin star	1 Michelin star	1 Michelin star	1 Michelin star	1 Michelin star	1 Michelin star	1 Michelin star	1 Michelin star
Fred	Rotterdam	1 Michelin star	1 Michelin star	1 Michelin star	2 Michelin stars	2 Michelin stars	2 Michelin stars	2 Michelin stars	2 Michelin stars	2 Michelin stars	2 Michelin stars
Wereldmuseum	Rotterdam	—	—	—	1 Michelin star	1 Michelin star	1 Michelin star	1 Michelin star	—	—	—
FG Food Labs	Rotterdam	—	—	—	—	1 Michelin star	1 Michelin star	1 Michelin star	1 Michelin star	1 Michelin star	1 Michelin star
Joelia	Rotterdam	—	—	—	—	—	1 Michelin star	1 Michelin star	1 Michelin star	1 Michelin star	1 Michelin star
Fitzgerald	Rotterdam	—	—	—	—	—	—	—	1 Michelin star	1 Michelin star	1 Michelin star
The Millèn	Rotterdam	—	—	—	—	—	—	—	—	1 Michelin star	1 Michelin star
Niven	Rijswijk	1 Michelin star	1 Michelin star	1 Michelin star	1 Michelin star	1 Michelin star	1 Michelin star	1 Michelin star	1 Michelin star	1 Michelin star	1 Michelin star
Paul van Waarden	Rijswijk	1 Michelin star	1 Michelin star		Closed						
Frouckje State	Ryptsjerk	1 Michelin star	1 Michelin star	1 Michelin star	—	—	—	—	—	—	—
Chalet Royal	Den Bosch	1 Michelin star	Closed								
Noble	Den Bosch	—	—	—	—	—	—	1 Michelin star	1 Michelin star	1 Michelin star	1 Michelin star
Sense	Den Bosch		1 Michelin star	1 Michelin star	1 Michelin star	1 Michelin star	1 Michelin star	1 Michelin star	1 Michelin star	1 Michelin star	1 Michelin star
De Vrienden van Jacob	Santpoort	1 Michelin star	1 Michelin star	1 Michelin star	1 Michelin star	1 Michelin star	1 Michelin star	1 Michelin star	1 Michelin star	1 Michelin star	1 Michelin star
Seinpost	Scheveningen	1 Michelin star	1 Michelin star	1 Michelin star	1 Michelin star	1 Michelin star	1 Michelin star	—	—	—	—
De Loohoeve	Schoonloo	—	—	—	—	—	—	—	—	1 Michelin star	1 Michelin star
Merlet	Schoorl	1 Michelin star	1 Michelin star	1 Michelin star	1 Michelin star	1 Michelin star	1 Michelin star	1 Michelin star	1 Michelin star	1 Michelin star	1 Michelin star
Wollerich	Sint-Oedenrode	1 Michelin star	1 Michelin star	1 Michelin star	1 Michelin star	1 Michelin star	1 Michelin star	1 Michelin star	1 Michelin star	1 Michelin star	1 Michelin star
Oud Sluis	Sluis	3 Michelin stars	3 Michelin stars	3 Michelin stars	Closed						
Aubergine	Steyl	1 Michelin star	1 Michelin star	1 Michelin star	1 Michelin star	1 Michelin star	1 Michelin star	1 Michelin star	1 Michelin star	—	—
La Trinité	Sluis	1 Michelin star	1 Michelin star	1 Michelin star	1 Michelin star	1 Michelin star	1 Michelin star	1 Michelin star	1 Michelin star	1 Michelin star	—
Monarh	Tilburg	—	—	—	—	—	—	—	—	1 Michelin star	1 Michelin star
De Leuf	Ubachsberg	2 Michelin stars	1 Michelin star	1 Michelin star	1 Michelin star	1 Michelin star	1 Michelin star	1 Michelin star	1 Michelin star	1 Michelin star	1 Michelin star
Oonivoo	Uden	—	—	—	—	—	—	—	—	1 Michelin star	1 Michelin star
Restaurant Karel 5	Utrecht	1 Michelin star	1 Michelin star	1 Michelin star	—	—	—	—	—	—	—
De Leest	Vaassen	2 Michelin stars	2 Michelin stars	2 Michelin stars	3 Michelin stars	3 Michelin stars	3 Michelin stars	3 Michelin stars	3 Michelin stars	3 Michelin stars	Closed
Eden	Valkenswaard	—	—	—	—	—	—	—	—	—	1 Michelin star
Valuas	Venlo	1 Michelin star	1 Michelin star	1 Michelin star	1 Michelin star	1 Michelin star	1 Michelin star	1 Michelin star	1 Michelin star	1 Michelin star	1 Michelin star
De Heer Kocken	Vught	1 Michelin star	1 Michelin star	1 Michelin star	1 Michelin star	1 Michelin star	1 Michelin star	1 Michelin star	1 Michelin star	1 Michelin star	1 Michelin star
Savelberg	Voorburg	1 Michelin star	1 Michelin star	1 Michelin star	1 Michelin star	Closed					
De Nederlanden	Vreeland	1 Michelin star	1 Michelin star	1 Michelin star	1 Michelin star	1 Michelin star	1 Michelin star	1 Michelin star	1 Michelin star	1 Michelin star	1 Michelin star
De Treeswijkhoeve	Waalre	1 Michelin star	1 Michelin star	2 Michelin stars	2 Michelin stars	2 Michelin stars	2 Michelin stars	2 Michelin stars	2 Michelin stars	2 Michelin stars	2 Michelin stars
Bij Jef	Den Hoorn	1 Michelin star	1 Michelin star	1 Michelin star	1 Michelin star	1 Michelin star	1 Michelin star	1 Michelin star	1 Michelin star	1 Michelin star	1 Michelin star
O Mundo	Wageningen	1 Michelin star	1 Michelin star	1 Michelin star	1 Michelin star	1 Michelin star	1 Michelin star	1 Michelin star	—	—	—
De Moerbei	Warmond	1 Michelin star	1 Michelin star	1 Michelin star	1 Michelin star	1 Michelin star	1 Michelin star	1 Michelin star	1 Michelin star	1 Michelin star	1 Michelin star
Bretelli	Weert	1 Michelin star	1 Michelin star	1 Michelin star	1 Michelin star	1 Michelin star	1 Michelin star	1 Michelin star	1 Michelin star	—	
Marrees	Weert	—	—	—	—	—	—	—	—	—	1 Michelin star
Brienen aan de Maas	Well	1 Michelin star	1 Michelin star	1 Michelin star	1 Michelin star	1 Michelin star	1 Michelin star	1 Michelin star	1 Michelin star	1 Michelin star	1 Michelin star
Katseveer	Wilhelminadorp	1 Michelin star	1 Michelin star	1 Michelin star	1 Michelin star	1 Michelin star	1 Michelin star	1 Michelin star	1 Michelin star	1 Michelin star	1 Michelin star
O&O	Sint Willebrord	—	—	—	—	—	—	—	—	1 Michelin star	1 Michelin star
Vista restaurant & food bar	Willemstad	—	—	—	—	—	—	—	1 Michelin star	1 Michelin star	1 Michelin star
Strandlodge	Winterswijk	—	—	—	—	—	1 Michelin star	1 Michelin star	1 Michelin star	1 Michelin star	—
Mijn Keuken	Wouw	1 Michelin star	1 Michelin star	1 Michelin star	1 Michelin star	1 Michelin star	1 Michelin star	1 Michelin star	1 Michelin star	1 Michelin star	1 Michelin star
De Vlindertuin	Zuidlaren	1 Michelin star	1 Michelin star	1 Michelin star	1 Michelin star	1 Michelin star	1 Michelin star	1 Michelin star	1 Michelin star	1 Michelin star	1 Michelin star
De Groene Lantaarn	Zuidwolde	1 Michelin star	1 Michelin star	1 Michelin star	1 Michelin star	1 Michelin star	2 Michelin stars	2 Michelin stars	2 Michelin stars	2 Michelin stars	2 Michelin stars
't Schulten Hues	Zutphen	1 Michelin star	1 Michelin star	1 Michelin star	1 Michelin star	1 Michelin star	1 Michelin star	1 Michelin star	1 Michelin star	Closed	
De Zwethheul	Zweth	2 Michelin stars	2 Michelin stars	2 Michelin stars	2 Michelin stars	Closed					
Aan de Zweth	Zweth	—	—	—	—	—	1 Michelin star	1 Michelin star	1 Michelin star	1 Michelin star	1 Michelin star
De Librije	Zwolle	3 Michelin stars	3 Michelin stars	3 Michelin stars	3 Michelin stars	3 Michelin stars	3 Michelin stars	3 Michelin stars	3 Michelin stars	3 Michelin stars	3 Michelin stars
Librije's Zusje	Zwolle	1 Michelin star	2 Michelin stars	2 Michelin stars	2 Michelin stars	Closed					
Reference											

== 2001–2010 ==
Key
1 Michelin star	One Michelin star
2 Michelin stars	Two Michelin stars
3 Michelin stars	Three Michelin stars
—	The restaurant did not receive a star that year
Closed	The restaurant is no longer open

Michelin-starred restaurants
Name	Location	2001	2002	2003	2004	2005	2006	2007	2008	2009	2010
De Fuik	Aalst	—	—	—	—	—	—	—	1 Michelin star	1 Michelin star	1 Michelin star
De Saffraan	Amersfoort	—	—	—	—	—	—	—	—	—	1 Michelin star
Mariënhof	Amersfoort	1 Michelin star	Closed								
De Rôtisserie	Amersfoort	1 Michelin star	—	—	—	—	—	—	—	—	—
Aan de Poel	Amstelveen	—	—	—	—	—	—	—	—	1 Michelin star	1 Michelin star
Ciel Bleu	Amsterdam	—	—	—	—	1 Michelin star	1 Michelin star	1 Michelin star	2 Michelin stars	2 Michelin stars	2 Michelin stars
Christophe	Amsterdam	1 Michelin star	1 Michelin star	1 Michelin star	1 Michelin star	1 Michelin star	1 Michelin star	—	—	—	—
La Rive	Amsterdam	1 Michelin star	2 Michelin stars	2 Michelin stars	2 Michelin stars	2 Michelin stars	1 Michelin star	1 Michelin star	1 Michelin star	1 Michelin star	1 Michelin star
Restaurant Vermeer	Amsterdam	—	1 Michelin star	2 Michelin stars	2 Michelin stars	1 Michelin star	1 Michelin star	1 Michelin star	—	—	—
Sichuan Food	Amsterdam	1 Michelin star	1 Michelin star	1 Michelin star	1 Michelin star	1 Michelin star	—	—	—	—	—
Van Vlaanderen	Amsterdam	—	1 Michelin star	1 Michelin star	1 Michelin star	1 Michelin star	—	—	—	—	—
Vinkeles	Amsterdam	—	—	—	—	—	—	—	—	—	1 Michelin star
Vossius	Amsterdam	—	1 Michelin star	1 Michelin star	Closed						
Yamazato	Amsterdam	—	1 Michelin star	1 Michelin star	1 Michelin star	1 Michelin star	1 Michelin star	1 Michelin star	1 Michelin star	1 Michelin star	1 Michelin star
Echoput	Amsterdam	—	1 Michelin star	1 Michelin star	1 Michelin star	—	—	—	—	—	—
Le Restaurant	Amsterdam	—	—	—	—	—	—	—	—	—	1 Michelin star
Het Jachthuis Hoog Soeren	Apeldoorn	1 Michelin star	—	—	—	—	—	—	—	—	—
De Heeren van Harinxma	Beetsterzwaag	1 Michelin star	1 Michelin star	1 Michelin star	1 Michelin star	1 Michelin star	1 Michelin star	—	—	—	—
Het Koetshuis	Bennekom	1 Michelin star	1 Michelin star	1 Michelin star	1 Michelin star	1 Michelin star	1 Michelin star	1 Michelin star	1 Michelin star	1 Michelin star	1 Michelin star
Koriander	Bergum/Drachten	1 Michelin star	1 Michelin star	1 Michelin star	1 Michelin star	1 Michelin star	1 Michelin star	1 Michelin star	1 Michelin star	1 Michelin star	1 Michelin star
De Bokkedoorns	Overveen	2 Michelin stars	2 Michelin stars	2 Michelin stars	2 Michelin stars	2 Michelin stars	2 Michelin stars	2 Michelin stars	2 Michelin stars	2 Michelin stars	2 Michelin stars
Kaatje bij de Sluis	Blokzijl	2 Michelin stars	2 Michelin stars	1 Michelin star	1 Michelin star	—	1 Michelin star	1 Michelin star	1 Michelin star	1 Michelin star	1 Michelin star
Hof van Sonoy	Blokzijl	—	—	—	—	1 Michelin star	1 Michelin star	1 Michelin star	1 Michelin star	Closed	
De Stenen Tafel	Borculo	1 Michelin star	1 Michelin star	1 Michelin star	1 Michelin star	1 Michelin star	1 Michelin star	1 Michelin star	1 Michelin star	1 Michelin star	1 Michelin star
De Hoefslag	Bosch en Duin	1 Michelin star	1 Michelin star	1 Michelin star	1 Michelin star	1 Michelin star	—	—	—	1 Michelin star	1 Michelin star
Wolfslaar	Breda	—	—	—	—	1 Michelin star	1 Michelin star	1 Michelin star	1 Michelin star	1 Michelin star	1 Michelin star
De Kromme Watergang	Slijkplaat, Hoofdplaat	—	—	—	—	1 Michelin star	1 Michelin star	1 Michelin star	1 Michelin star	1 Michelin star	1 Michelin star
Soigné	Bussum	—	—	—	—	—	—	—	—	—	1 Michelin star
Apicius	Castricum	—	1 Michelin star	1 Michelin star	1 Michelin star	1 Michelin star	1 Michelin star	2 Michelin stars	2 Michelin stars	2 Michelin stars	2 Michelin stars
De Zwethheul	Schipluiden	1 Michelin star	1 Michelin star	1 Michelin star	1 Michelin star	2 Michelin stars	2 Michelin stars	2 Michelin stars	2 Michelin stars	2 Michelin stars	2 Michelin stars
Chalet Royal	Den Bosch	1 Michelin star	1 Michelin star	1 Michelin star	1 Michelin star	1 Michelin star	1 Michelin star	1 Michelin star	1 Michelin star	1 Michelin star	1 Michelin star
't Ganzenest	The Hague	1 Michelin star	1 Michelin star	—	—	1 Michelin star	—	Closed			
Calla's	The Hague	—	1 Michelin star	1 Michelin star	1 Michelin star	1 Michelin star	1 Michelin star	1 Michelin star	1 Michelin star	1 Michelin star	1 Michelin star
Le Cirque	The Hague	—	—	—	—	1 Michelin star	1 Michelin star	1 Michelin star	—	—	—
Culinaire Verwennerij Bij Jef	Den Hoorn	—	—	—	—	—	—	—	—	1 Michelin star	1 Michelin star
Lai Sin's	Driebergen-Rijsenburg	1 Michelin star	1 Michelin star	1 Michelin star	1 Michelin star	1 Michelin star	1 Michelin star	1 Michelin star	1 Michelin star	—	—
De Karpendonkse Hoeve	Eindhoven	1 Michelin star	1 Michelin star	1 Michelin star	1 Michelin star	1 Michelin star	1 Michelin star	1 Michelin star	1 Michelin star	1 Michelin star	1 Michelin star
Avant-Garde van Groeninge	Eindhoven	—	—	—	1 Michelin star	1 Michelin star	1 Michelin star	1 Michelin star	1 Michelin star	1 Michelin star	1 Michelin star
Sonoy	Emmeloord	—	—	—	—	—	—	—	—	—	1 Michelin star
Het Koetshuis Schuttersveld	Enschede	1 Michelin star	—	—	—	—	—	—	—	—	—
De Roggebot	Ermelo	1 Michelin star	1 Michelin star	1 Michelin star	1 Michelin star	1 Michelin star	1 Michelin star	1 Michelin star	—	—	—
De Zwaan	Etten-Leur	1 Michelin star	1 Michelin star	1 Michelin star	1 Michelin star	1 Michelin star	1 Michelin star	1 Michelin star	1 Michelin star	1 Michelin star	1 Michelin star
De Lindenhof	Giethoorn	1 Michelin star	1 Michelin star	1 Michelin star	1 Michelin star	2 Michelin stars	2 Michelin stars	2 Michelin stars	2 Michelin stars	2 Michelin stars	2 Michelin stars
Solo	Gorinchem	—	—	—	—	—	—	1 Michelin star	1 Michelin star	1 Michelin star	1 Michelin star
Muller	Groningen	1 Michelin star	1 Michelin star	1 Michelin star	1 Michelin star	1 Michelin star	1 Michelin star	1 Michelin star	1 Michelin star	1 Michelin star	1 Michelin star
Herberg Onder de Linden	Aduard	1 Michelin star	1 Michelin star	1 Michelin star	1 Michelin star	1 Michelin star	1 Michelin star	1 Michelin star	1 Michelin star	1 Michelin star	1 Michelin star
Le Sapiche	Gulpen	1 Michelin star	1 Michelin star	1 Michelin star	1 Michelin star	1 Michelin star	Closed				
Chapeau!	Bloemendaal	—	—	1 Michelin star	1 Michelin star	1 Michelin star	1 Michelin star	1 Michelin star	1 Michelin star	1 Michelin star	1 Michelin star
De Bokkepruik	Heemse	1 Michelin star	1 Michelin star	1 Michelin star	1 Michelin star	1 Michelin star	1 Michelin star	1 Michelin star	1 Michelin star	1 Michelin star	1 Michelin star
Olivio	Harderwijk	—	1 Michelin star	1 Michelin star	1 Michelin star	1 Michelin star	—	—	—	—	—
Basiliek	Harderwijk	—	—	—	—	—	—	1 Michelin star	1 Michelin star	1 Michelin star	1 Michelin star
't Nonnetje	Harderwijk	—	—	—	1 Michelin star	1 Michelin star	1 Michelin star	—	—	1 Michelin star	1 Michelin star
De Kromme Dissel	Heelsum	1 Michelin star	1 Michelin star	1 Michelin star	1 Michelin star	1 Michelin star	1 Michelin star	1 Michelin star	1 Michelin star	1 Michelin star	1 Michelin star
Cheval Blanc	Heemstede	—	—	—	—	—	—	1 Michelin star	1 Michelin star	1 Michelin star	1 Michelin star
De Boterbloem	Heerlen	1 Michelin star	1 Michelin star	1 Michelin star	1 Michelin star	Closed					
Boreas	Heeze	—	—	—	1 Michelin star	1 Michelin star	1 Michelin star	1 Michelin star	1 Michelin star	1 Michelin star	2 Michelin stars
Brasserie de Eglantier	Hilvarenbeek	1 Michelin star	1 Michelin star	—	—	—	—	—	—	—	—
Spandershoeve	Hilversum	1 Michelin star	1 Michelin star	1 Michelin star	1 Michelin star	1 Michelin star	1 Michelin star	1 Michelin star	—	—	—
Lakes	Hilversum	—	—	—	—	—	—	—	—	1 Michelin star	1 Michelin star
Kasteel Heemstede	Houten	—	—	1 Michelin star	1 Michelin star	1 Michelin star	1 Michelin star	1 Michelin star	1 Michelin star	—	—
St Gerlach	Houthem	—	—	—	—	1 Michelin star	1 Michelin star	1 Michelin star	—	—	—
De Molen	Kaatsheuvel	—	—	—	—	—	—	—	1 Michelin star	1 Michelin star	1 Michelin star
Inter Scaldes	Kruiningen	2 Michelin stars	2 Michelin stars	2 Michelin stars	2 Michelin stars	2 Michelin stars	2 Michelin stars	2 Michelin stars	2 Michelin stars	2 Michelin stars	2 Michelin stars
Schathoes Verhildersum	Leens	—	—	—	1 Michelin star	1 Michelin star	1 Michelin star	1 Michelin star	1 Michelin star	1 Michelin star	1 Michelin star
Tante Koosje	Loenen	1 Michelin star	1 Michelin star	1 Michelin star	—	—	1 Michelin star	1 Michelin star	1 Michelin star	1 Michelin star	1 Michelin star
Auguste	Maarssen	—	—	—	—	—	1 Michelin star	1 Michelin star	1 Michelin star	—	—
Da Vinci	Maasbracht	1 Michelin star	1 Michelin star	1 Michelin star	1 Michelin star	1 Michelin star	1 Michelin star	1 Michelin star	1 Michelin star	2 Michelin stars	2 Michelin stars
Tout à Fait	Maastricht	—	1 Michelin star	1 Michelin star	1 Michelin star	1 Michelin star	1 Michelin star	1 Michelin star	1 Michelin star	1 Michelin star	1 Michelin star
Château Neercanne	Maastricht	1 Michelin star	1 Michelin star	1 Michelin star	1 Michelin star	1 Michelin star	1 Michelin star	1 Michelin star	1 Michelin star	1 Michelin star	1 Michelin star
Toine Hermsen	Maastricht	2 Michelin stars	1 Michelin star	1 Michelin star	1 Michelin star	1 Michelin star	1 Michelin star	1 Michelin star	1 Michelin star	1 Michelin star	1 Michelin star
Beluga	Maastricht	1 Michelin star	1 Michelin star	1 Michelin star	1 Michelin star	2 Michelin stars	2 Michelin stars	2 Michelin stars	2 Michelin stars	2 Michelin stars	2 Michelin stars
Au Coin des Bons Enfants	Maastricht	—	—	—	—	—	1 Michelin star	1 Michelin star	1 Michelin star	1 Michelin star	1 Michelin star
Le Marron	Malden	—	—	—	—	—	—	1 Michelin star	1 Michelin star	1 Michelin star	1 Michelin star
Het Groot Paradijs	Middelburg	1 Michelin star	1 Michelin star	—	—	—	—	1 Michelin star	—	—	—
Posthoorn	Monnickendam	—	—	—	—	—	—	—	—	1 Michelin star	1 Michelin star
Mario	Neck	1 Michelin star	1 Michelin star	1 Michelin star	—	—	1 Michelin star	1 Michelin star	—	—	—
Cour du Nord	Nooitgedacht	—	—	—	—	—	—	—	—	1 Michelin star	1 Michelin star
De Gieser Wildeman	Noordeloos	—	—	—	—	—	1 Michelin star	1 Michelin star	1 Michelin star	1 Michelin star	1 Michelin star
Latour	Noordwijk	—	—	—	—	1 Michelin star	1 Michelin star	1 Michelin star	1 Michelin star	1 Michelin star	1 Michelin star
De Lindehof	Nuenen	—	—	1 Michelin star	1 Michelin star	—	1 Michelin star	1 Michelin star	1 Michelin star	1 Michelin star	1 Michelin star
In de'n Dillegaard	Nuth	—	—	1 Michelin star	1 Michelin star	—	1 Michelin star	1 Michelin star	1 Michelin star	1 Michelin star	—
De Swaen	Oisterwijk		1 Michelin star	1 Michelin star	—	—	—	—	—	—	—
De Grië	Oosterend	1 Michelin star	1 Michelin star	1 Michelin star	1 Michelin star	1 Michelin star	—	1 Michelin star	—	—	—
De Wanne	Ootmarsum	1 Michelin star	1 Michelin star	1 Michelin star	1 Michelin star	1 Michelin star	1 Michelin star	1 Michelin star	1 Michelin star	1 Michelin star	1 Michelin star
Cordial	Oss	—	1 Michelin star	1 Michelin star	1 Michelin star	1 Michelin star	1 Michelin star	1 Michelin star	1 Michelin star	1 Michelin star	1 Michelin star
Ron Blaauw	Ouderkerk aan de Amstel	—	—	—	1 Michelin star	1 Michelin star	2 Michelin stars	2 Michelin stars	2 Michelin stars	2 Michelin stars	2 Michelin stars
't Brouwerskolkje	Overveen	—	—	—	—	—	1 Michelin star	1 Michelin star	1 Michelin star	2 Michelin stars	2 Michelin stars
De Kromme Dissel	Heelsum	1 Michelin star	1 Michelin star	1 Michelin star	1 Michelin star	1 Michelin star	—	—	—	—	—
Hermitage	Rijsoord	1 Michelin star	1 Michelin star	1 Michelin star	1 Michelin star	1 Michelin star	1 Michelin star	1 Michelin star	1 Michelin star	1 Michelin star	1 Michelin star
Paul van Waarden	Rijswijk	—	1 Michelin star	1 Michelin star	1 Michelin star	1 Michelin star	1 Michelin star	1 Michelin star	1 Michelin star	1 Michelin star	1 Michelin star
Imko Binnerts	Rijswijk	—	—	—	—	1 Michelin star	1 Michelin star	—	—	—	—
Onder de Boompjes	Overloon/Roermond	1 Michelin star	1 Michelin star	1 Michelin star	1 Michelin star	—	—	—	—	—	—
Parkheuvel	Rotterdam	2 Michelin stars	3 Michelin stars	3 Michelin stars	3 Michelin stars	3 Michelin stars	3 Michelin stars	1 Michelin star	1 Michelin star	2 Michelin stars	2 Michelin stars
De Engel	Rotterdam	1 Michelin star	—	—	—	—	—	—	—	—	—
La Vilette	Rotterdam	—	—	1 Michelin star	1 Michelin star	1 Michelin star	1 Michelin star	1 Michelin star	1 Michelin star	—	—
Ivy	Rotterdam	—	—	—	—	—	—	—	—	—	1 Michelin star
Amarone	Rotterdam	—	—	—	—	—	—	—	1 Michelin star	1 Michelin star	1 Michelin star
Fred	Rotterdam	—	—	—	—	—	—	—	—	—	1 Michelin star
Frouckje State	Ryptsjerk	—	—	—	—	—	—	—	—	1 Michelin star	1 Michelin star
De Vrienden van Jacob	Santpoort	—	—	—	—	—	1 Michelin star	1 Michelin star	1 Michelin star	1 Michelin star	1 Michelin star
Seinpost	Scheveningen	—	—	—	—	—	1 Michelin star	1 Michelin star	1 Michelin star	1 Michelin star	1 Michelin star
Merlet	Schoorl	1 Michelin star	1 Michelin star	1 Michelin star	1 Michelin star	1 Michelin star	1 Michelin star	1 Michelin star	1 Michelin star	1 Michelin star	1 Michelin star
Wollerich	Sint-Oedenrode	1 Michelin star	1 Michelin star	1 Michelin star	1 Michelin star	1 Michelin star	1 Michelin star	1 Michelin star	—	—	1 Michelin star
Oud Sluis	Sluis	2 Michelin stars	2 Michelin stars	2 Michelin stars	2 Michelin stars	2 Michelin stars	3 Michelin stars	3 Michelin stars	3 Michelin stars	3 Michelin stars	3 Michelin stars
Aubergine	Steyl	—	—	—	—	—	1 Michelin star	1 Michelin star	1 Michelin star	1 Michelin star	1 Michelin star
De Leuf	Ubachsberg	1 Michelin star	1 Michelin star	1 Michelin star	1 Michelin star	1 Michelin star	1 Michelin star	1 Michelin star	2 Michelin stars	2 Michelin stars	2 Michelin stars
Helianthushof	Uden	1 Michelin star	—	—	—	—	—	—	—	—	—
Restaurant Karel 5	Utrecht	—	—	—	—	1 Michelin star	1 Michelin star	1 Michelin star	1 Michelin star	1 Michelin star	1 Michelin star
De Leest	Vaassen	—	—	1 Michelin star	1 Michelin star	1 Michelin star	1 Michelin star	2 Michelin stars	2 Michelin stars	2 Michelin stars	2 Michelin stars
Prinses Juliana	Valkenburg aan de Geul	1 Michelin star	1 Michelin star	1 Michelin star	1 Michelin star	1 Michelin star	1 Michelin star	—	—	—	—
Valuas	Venlo	—	—	—	—	—	1 Michelin star	1 Michelin star	1 Michelin star	1 Michelin star	1 Michelin star
Savelberg	Voorburg	1 Michelin star	1 Michelin star	1 Michelin star	1 Michelin star	1 Michelin star	1 Michelin star	1 Michelin star	1 Michelin star	1 Michelin star	1 Michelin star
De Nederlanden	Vreeland	2 Michelin stars	2 Michelin stars	1 Michelin star	1 Michelin star	1 Michelin star	1 Michelin star	1 Michelin star	1 Michelin star	1 Michelin star	1 Michelin star
De Heer Kocken	Vught	—	—	—	—	—	—	—	—	1 Michelin star	1 Michelin star
De Treeswijkhoeve	Waalre	—	—	—	—	—	1 Michelin star	1 Michelin star	1 Michelin star	1 Michelin star	1 Michelin star
O Mundo	Wageningen	—	—	—	—	—	—	—	—	—	1 Michelin star
Der Bloasbalg	Wahlwiller	1 Michelin star	1 Michelin star	1 Michelin star	1 Michelin star	1 Michelin star	Closed				
De Moerbei	Warmond	—	—	—	—	—	—	—	—	1 Michelin star	1 Michelin star
't Raethuys	Wateringen	—	—	—	—	—	1 Michelin star	1 Michelin star	1 Michelin star	1 Michelin star	—
Bretelli	Weert	—	—	—	—	—	—	1 Michelin star	1 Michelin star	1 Michelin star	1 Michelin star
Brienen aan de Maas	Well	—	—	—	—	—	—	1 Michelin star	1 Michelin star	1 Michelin star	1 Michelin star
Katseveer	Wilhelminadorp	—	—	—	—	—	1 Michelin star	1 Michelin star	1 Michelin star	1 Michelin star	1 Michelin star
't Veerhuis	Wolphaartsdijk	—	—	—	—	—	—	—	1 Michelin star	1 Michelin star	—
Mijn Keuken	Wouw	—	—	—	—	—	—	—	—	—	1 Michelin star
Nolet Het Reymerswale	Yerseke	1 Michelin star	1 Michelin star	1 Michelin star	1 Michelin star	1 Michelin star	1 Michelin star	1 Michelin star	1 Michelin star	1 Michelin star	1 Michelin star
Imko's	IJmuiden	1 Michelin star	1 Michelin star	1 Michelin star	Closed						
De Vlindertuin	Zuidlaren	—	—	—	—	—	—	—	1 Michelin star	1 Michelin star	1 Michelin star
't Schulten Hues	Zutphen	—	—	—	—	1 Michelin star	1 Michelin star	1 Michelin star	1 Michelin star	1 Michelin star	1 Michelin star
Idylle	Zweeloo	1 Michelin star	1 Michelin star	1 Michelin star	1 Michelin star	1 Michelin star	1 Michelin star	1 Michelin star	Closed		
De Librije	Zwolle	2 Michelin stars	2 Michelin stars	2 Michelin stars	3 Michelin stars	3 Michelin stars	3 Michelin stars	3 Michelin stars	3 Michelin stars	3 Michelin stars	3 Michelin stars
Librije's Zusje	Zwolle	—	—	—	—	—	—	—	—	1 Michelin star	1 Michelin star
Reference(s)											

== 1991–2000 ==
Key
1 Michelin star	One Michelin star
2 Michelin stars	Two Michelin stars
—	The restaurant did not receive a star that year
Closed	The restaurant is no longer open

Michelin-starred restaurants
Name	Location	1991	1992	1993	1994	1995	1996	1997	1998	1999	2000
Mariënhof	Amersfoort	—	—	—	—	—	1 Michelin star	1 Michelin star	1 Michelin star	1 Michelin star	1 Michelin star
Molen De Dikkert	Amstelveen	1 Michelin star	1 Michelin star	—	—	—	—	—	—	—	—
Excelsior	Amsterdam	1 Michelin star	1 Michelin star	—	—	—	—	—	—	—	—
De Kersentuin	Amsterdam	1 Michelin star	1 Michelin star	—	—	—	—	—	—	—	—
De Trechter	Amsterdam	1 Michelin star	1 Michelin star	1 Michelin star	1 Michelin star	1 Michelin star	Closed				
Christophe	Amsterdam	1 Michelin star	1 Michelin star	1 Michelin star	1 Michelin star	1 Michelin star	1 Michelin star	1 Michelin star	1 Michelin star	1 Michelin star	1 Michelin star
La Rive	Amsterdam	—	—	—	1 Michelin star	1 Michelin star	1 Michelin star	2 Michelin stars	2 Michelin stars	2 Michelin stars	2 Michelin stars
De Graaf	Amsterdam	1 Michelin star	—	—	—	—	—	—	—	—	—
Halvemaan	Amsterdam	1 Michelin star	1 Michelin star	1 Michelin star	1 Michelin star	1 Michelin star	1 Michelin star	1 Michelin star	—	—	—
Restaurant Vermeer	Amsterdam	—	—	1 Michelin star	1 Michelin star	1 Michelin star	1 Michelin star	1 Michelin star	1 Michelin star	1 Michelin star	1 Michelin star
Sichuan Food	Amsterdam	—	—	1 Michelin star	1 Michelin star	1 Michelin star	1 Michelin star	1 Michelin star	1 Michelin star	1 Michelin star	1 Michelin star
De Echoput	Apeldoorn	1 Michelin star	1 Michelin star	1 Michelin star	1 Michelin star	1 Michelin star	1 Michelin star	1 Michelin star	—	—	—
Het Jachthuis Hoog Soeren	Apeldoorn	—	—	—	1 Michelin star	1 Michelin star	1 Michelin star	1 Michelin star	1 Michelin star	1 Michelin star	1 Michelin star
Het Koetshuis	Bennekom	—	—	—	—	—	—	—	1 Michelin star	1 Michelin star	1 Michelin star
Koriander	Bergum/Drachten	—	—	—	—	—	—	—	—	1 Michelin star	1 Michelin star
De Bokkedoorns	Overveen	2 Michelin stars	2 Michelin stars	2 Michelin stars	2 Michelin stars	2 Michelin stars	2 Michelin stars	2 Michelin stars	2 Michelin stars	2 Michelin stars	2 Michelin stars
Kaatje bij de Sluis	Blokzijl	1 Michelin star	2 Michelin stars	2 Michelin stars	2 Michelin stars	2 Michelin stars	2 Michelin stars	2 Michelin stars	2 Michelin stars	2 Michelin stars	2 Michelin stars
De Stenen Tafel	Borculo	—	—	—	—	—	—	—	—	1 Michelin star	1 Michelin star
De Hoefslag	Bosch en Duin	1 Michelin star	1 Michelin star	1 Michelin star	1 Michelin star	1 Michelin star	1 Michelin star	1 Michelin star	1 Michelin star	1 Michelin star	1 Michelin star
Gravin van Buren	Buren	1 Michelin star	1 Michelin star	1 Michelin star	1 Michelin star	1 Michelin star	—	—	—	—	—
De Zwethheul	Schipluiden	1 Michelin star	1 Michelin star	1 Michelin star	1 Michelin star	1 Michelin star	1 Michelin star	1 Michelin star	1 Michelin star	1 Michelin star	1 Michelin star
Chalet Royal	Den Bosch	—	—	—	—	—	—	—	1 Michelin star	1 Michelin star	1 Michelin star
't Misverstant	Den Bosch	1 Michelin star	1 Michelin star	1 Michelin star	1 Michelin star	1 Michelin star	—	—	1 Michelin star	1 Michelin star	1 Michelin star
Corona	The Hague	1 Michelin star	1 Michelin star	—	—	—	—	—	—	—	—
Vreugd en Rust	Voorburg	1 Michelin star	1 Michelin star	1 Michelin star	—	—	—	—	—	—	—
't Ganzenest	The Hague	—	—	—	1 Michelin star	1 Michelin star	1 Michelin star	1 Michelin star	1 Michelin star	1 Michelin star	1 Michelin star
Hermitage	Rijsoord	—	—	—	—	1 Michelin star	1 Michelin star	1 Michelin star	1 Michelin star	1 Michelin star	1 Michelin star
Lai Sin's	Driebergen-Rijsenburg	—	—	—	—	—	1 Michelin star	1 Michelin star	1 Michelin star	1 Michelin star	1 Michelin star
Duinrand	Drunen	1 Michelin star	1 Michelin star	1 Michelin star	1 Michelin star	1 Michelin star	—	—	—	—	—
De Acht Zaligheden	Eersel	1 Michelin star	1 Michelin star	1 Michelin star	1 Michelin star	1 Michelin star	—	—	—	—	—
De Karpendonkse Hoeve	Eindhoven	1 Michelin star	1 Michelin star	1 Michelin star	1 Michelin star	1 Michelin star	1 Michelin star	1 Michelin star	1 Michelin star	1 Michelin star	1 Michelin star
Het Koetshuis Schuttersveld	Enschede	1 Michelin star	1 Michelin star	1 Michelin star	1 Michelin star	1 Michelin star	1 Michelin star	1 Michelin star	1 Michelin star	1 Michelin star	1 Michelin star
De Zwaan	Etten-Leur	—	—	—	1 Michelin star	1 Michelin star	1 Michelin star	1 Michelin star	1 Michelin star	1 Michelin star	1 Michelin star
De Lindenhof	Giethoorn	—	—	—	—	—	1 Michelin star	1 Michelin star	1 Michelin star	1 Michelin star	1 Michelin star
Muller	Groningen	—	—	—	—	—	—	1 Michelin star	1 Michelin star	1 Michelin star	1 Michelin star
Le Mérinos d'Or	Groningen	1 Michelin star	—	—	—	—	—	—	—	—	—
Herberg Onder de Linden	Aduard	—	1 Michelin star	1 Michelin star	1 Michelin star	1 Michelin star	1 Michelin star	1 Michelin star	1 Michelin star	1 Michelin star	1 Michelin star
Le Sapiche	Gulpen	—	—	—	—	—	—	—	—	—	1 Michelin star
De Vergulde Wagen	Heemskerk	—	—	—	—	1 Michelin star	1 Michelin star	1 Michelin star	—	—	—
De Brave Hendrik	Hendrik Ido Ambacht	1 Michelin star	1 Michelin star	1 Michelin star	1 Michelin star	1 Michelin star	1 Michelin star	—	—	—	—
Spandershoeve	Hilversum	—	—	—	—	—	—	—	1 Michelin star	1 Michelin star	1 Michelin star
De Oude Rosmolen	Hoorn	2 Michelin stars	2 Michelin stars	2 Michelin stars	2 Michelin stars	2 Michelin stars	2 Michelin stars	2 Michelin stars	2 Michelin stars	2 Michelin stars	2 Michelin stars
Inter Scaldes	Kruiningen	2 Michelin stars	2 Michelin stars	2 Michelin stars	2 Michelin stars	2 Michelin stars	2 Michelin stars	2 Michelin stars	2 Michelin stars	2 Michelin stars	2 Michelin stars
Chagall	Leidschendam	1 Michelin star	—	—	—	—	—	—	—	—	—
Villa Rozenrust	Leidschendam	—	—	1 Michelin star	1 Michelin star	1 Michelin star	1 Michelin star	1 Michelin star	1 Michelin star	1 Michelin star	—
Tante Koosje	Loenen	—	—	—	—	—	—	—	1 Michelin star	1 Michelin star	1 Michelin star
De Kastanjehof	Lage Vuursche	1 Michelin star	—	—	—	—	—	—	—	—	—
Wilgenplas	Maarssen	1 Michelin star	1 Michelin star	1 Michelin star	1 Michelin star	1 Michelin star	1 Michelin star	1 Michelin star	1 Michelin star	1 Michelin star	1 Michelin star
Da Vinci	Maasbracht	—	—	—	—	—	—	—	—	1 Michelin star	1 Michelin star
Château Neercanne	Maastricht	1 Michelin star	1 Michelin star	1 Michelin star	1 Michelin star	1 Michelin star	1 Michelin star	1 Michelin star	1 Michelin star	1 Michelin star	1 Michelin star
Toine Hermsen	Maastricht	—	—	1 Michelin star	1 Michelin star	1 Michelin star	1 Michelin star	1 Michelin star	2 Michelin stars	2 Michelin stars	2 Michelin stars
Beluga	Maastricht	—	—	—	—	—	—	—	1 Michelin star	1 Michelin star	1 Michelin star
Het Groot Paradijs	Middelburg	—	—	—	—	—	1 Michelin star	1 Michelin star	1 Michelin star	1 Michelin star	1 Michelin star
De Hooge Heerlijkheid	Middelharnis	1 Michelin star	1 Michelin star	—	—	1 Michelin star	1 Michelin star	—	—	—	—
De Lindehof	Nuenen	—	1 Michelin star	1 Michelin star	1 Michelin star	1 Michelin star	—	—	—	—	—
De Beukenhof	Oegstgeest	1 Michelin star	1 Michelin star	1 Michelin star	1 Michelin star	1 Michelin star	—	—	—	—	—
De Swaen	Oisterwijk	2 Michelin stars	1 Michelin star	1 Michelin star	1 Michelin star	1 Michelin star	1 Michelin star	1 Michelin star	1 Michelin star	—	—
De Grië	Oosterend	—	—	1 Michelin star	1 Michelin star	1 Michelin star	1 Michelin star	1 Michelin star	1 Michelin star	1 Michelin star	1 Michelin star
De Wanne	Ootmarsum	—	1 Michelin star	1 Michelin star	1 Michelin star	1 Michelin star	1 Michelin star	1 Michelin star	1 Michelin star	1 Michelin star	1 Michelin star
De Kromme Dissel	Heelsum	1 Michelin star	1 Michelin star	1 Michelin star	1 Michelin star	1 Michelin star	1 Michelin star	1 Michelin star	1 Michelin star	1 Michelin star	1 Michelin star
Onder de Boompjes	Overloon	—	—	—	—	—	—	—	—	1 Michelin star	1 Michelin star
Parkheuvel	Rotterdam	1 Michelin star	1 Michelin star	1 Michelin star	1 Michelin star	2 Michelin stars	2 Michelin stars	2 Michelin stars	2 Michelin stars	2 Michelin stars	2 Michelin stars
De Engel	Rotterdam	—	—	—	—	—	—	1 Michelin star	1 Michelin star	1 Michelin star	1 Michelin star
Merlet	Schoorl	—	—	—	—	—	—	—	1 Michelin star	1 Michelin star	1 Michelin star
Wollerich	Sint-Oedenrode	—	—	—	—	—	—	1 Michelin star	1 Michelin star	1 Michelin star	1 Michelin star
Oud Sluis	Sluis	—	—	—	—	1 Michelin star	1 Michelin star	1 Michelin star	1 Michelin star	2 Michelin stars	2 Michelin stars
De Leuf	Ubachsberg	—	—	—	—	—	1 Michelin star	1 Michelin star	1 Michelin star	1 Michelin star	1 Michelin star
Helianthushof	Uden	—	—	—	—	—	—	—	1 Michelin star	1 Michelin star	1 Michelin star
Lindenhorst	Valkenburg aan de Geul	1 Michelin star	1 Michelin star	1 Michelin star	—	—	—	—	—	—	—
Prinses Juliana	Valkenburg aan de Geul	1 Michelin star	2 Michelin stars	2 Michelin stars	2 Michelin stars	2 Michelin stars	2 Michelin stars	1 Michelin star	1 Michelin star	1 Michelin star	1 Michelin star
Savelberg	Voorburg	—	—	—	—	—	—	1 Michelin star	1 Michelin star	1 Michelin star	1 Michelin star
De Nederlanden	Vreeland	—	—	—	—	—	—	—	—	1 Michelin star	2 Michelin stars
Der Bloasbalg	Wahlwiller	1 Michelin star	1 Michelin star	1 Michelin star	1 Michelin star	1 Michelin star	1 Michelin star	1 Michelin star	1 Michelin star	1 Michelin star	1 Michelin star
Auberge De Kieviet	Wassenaar	1 Michelin star	—	—	—	—	—	—	—	—	—
L'Auberge	Weert	1 Michelin star	2 Michelin stars	2 Michelin stars	2 Michelin stars	2 Michelin stars	2 Michelin stars	2 Michelin stars	2 Michelin stars	2 Michelin stars	2 Michelin stars
Duurstede	Wijk bij Duurstede	1 Michelin star	1 Michelin star	1 Michelin star	1 Michelin star	1 Michelin star	—	—	—	—	—
Nolet Het Reymerswale	Yerseke	1 Michelin star	1 Michelin star	1 Michelin star	1 Michelin star	1 Michelin star	1 Michelin star	1 Michelin star	1 Michelin star	1 Michelin star	1 Michelin star
Imko's	IJmuiden	—	—	—	—	—	—	—	—	1 Michelin star	1 Michelin star
Idylle	Zweeloo	—	—	—	—	—	—	1 Michelin star	1 Michelin star	1 Michelin star	1 Michelin star
De Bokkepruik	Zweeloo/Heemse	1 Michelin star	1 Michelin star	1 Michelin star	1 Michelin star	1 Michelin star	1 Michelin star	1 Michelin star	1 Michelin star	1 Michelin star	1 Michelin star
De Librije	Zwolle	—	—	1 Michelin star	1 Michelin star	1 Michelin star	1 Michelin star	1 Michelin star	1 Michelin star	2 Michelin stars	2 Michelin stars
Reference											

== 1981–1990 ==
Key
1 Michelin star	One Michelin star
2 Michelin stars	Two Michelin stars
—	The restaurant did not receive a star that year
Closed	The restaurant is no longer open

Michelin-starred restaurants
Name	Location	1981	1982	1983	1984	1985	1986	1987	1988	1989	1990
De Witte	Amersfoort	1 Michelin star	—	—	—	—	—	—	—	—	—
Molen De Dikkert	Amstelveen	—	—	1 Michelin star	1 Michelin star	1 Michelin star	1 Michelin star	1 Michelin star	1 Michelin star	1 Michelin star	1 Michelin star
Ile de France	Amstelveen	1 Michelin star	1 Michelin star	1 Michelin star	1 Michelin star	1 Michelin star	1 Michelin star	1 Michelin star	1 Michelin star	1 Michelin star	1 Michelin star
Auberge	Amsterdam	1 Michelin star	—	—	—	—	—	—	—	—	—
De Boerderij	Amsterdam	1 Michelin star	1 Michelin star	1 Michelin star	1 Michelin star	1 Michelin star	—	—	—	—	—
Excelsior	Amsterdam	—	—	—	—	—	—	1 Michelin star	1 Michelin star	1 Michelin star	1 Michelin star
De Kersentuin	Amsterdam	—	—	—	—	1 Michelin star	1 Michelin star	1 Michelin star	1 Michelin star	1 Michelin star	1 Michelin star
De Trechter	Amsterdam	—	—	—	—	1 Michelin star	1 Michelin star	1 Michelin star	1 Michelin star	1 Michelin star	1 Michelin star
Christophe	Amsterdam	—	—	—	—	—	—	—	—	1 Michelin star	1 Michelin star
De Graaf	Amsterdam	—	—	—	—	—	—	—	—	—	1 Michelin star
De Echoput	Apeldoorn	1 Michelin star	1 Michelin star	1 Michelin star	1 Michelin star	2 Michelin stars	2 Michelin stars	2 Michelin stars	2 Michelin stars	2 Michelin stars	1 Michelin star
La Diligence	Beek	1 Michelin star	1 Michelin star	1 Michelin star	1 Michelin star	1 Michelin star	—	—	—	—	—
De Oude Geleerde Man	Bennebroek	1 Michelin star	1 Michelin star	1 Michelin star	1 Michelin star	1 Michelin star	1 Michelin star	1 Michelin star	1 Michelin star	1 Michelin star	1 Michelin star
Hofstee	Bladel	—	—	—	—	—	—	1 Michelin star	1 Michelin star	—	—
De Bokkedoorns	Overveen	1 Michelin star	1 Michelin star	1 Michelin star	1 Michelin star	1 Michelin star	1 Michelin star	1 Michelin star	1 Michelin star	1 Michelin star	1 Michelin star
Kaatje bij de Sluis	Blokzijl	1 Michelin star	1 Michelin star	1 Michelin star	1 Michelin star	1 Michelin star	1 Michelin star	1 Michelin star	1 Michelin star	1 Michelin star	1 Michelin star
De Hoefslag	Bosch en Duin	2 Michelin stars	2 Michelin stars	2 Michelin stars	2 Michelin stars	2 Michelin stars	2 Michelin stars	1 Michelin star	1 Michelin star	1 Michelin star	1 Michelin star
Gravin van Buren	Buren	—	—	—	—	—	1 Michelin star	1 Michelin star	1 Michelin star	1 Michelin star	1 Michelin star
Binnen den Poort	Culemborg	—	—	—	1 Michelin star	1 Michelin star	1 Michelin star	—	—	—	—
Carelshaven	Delden	1 Michelin star	1 Michelin star	1 Michelin star	1 Michelin star	1 Michelin star	1 Michelin star	—	—	—	—
Le Chevalier	Delft	1 Michelin star	1 Michelin star	1 Michelin star	1 Michelin star	1 Michelin star	1 Michelin star	1 Michelin star	—	—	—
De Zwethheul	Schipluiden	—	—	—	—	—	—	—	—	—	1 Michelin star
't Misverstant	Den Bosch	—	—	—	1 Michelin star	1 Michelin star	1 Michelin star	1 Michelin star	1 Michelin star	1 Michelin star	1 Michelin star
Pettelaer	Den Bosch	—	—	1 Michelin star	1 Michelin star	1 Michelin star	1 Michelin star	1 Michelin star	1 Michelin star	1 Michelin star	—
Saur	The Hague	1 Michelin star	1 Michelin star	1 Michelin star	1 Michelin star	1 Michelin star	1 Michelin star	1 Michelin star	1 Michelin star	1 Michelin star	—
Corona	The Hague	—	—	—	—	—	—	—	1 Michelin star	1 Michelin star	1 Michelin star
Vreugd en Rust	Voorburg	—	—	—	—	—	—	—	—	—	1 Michelin star
Duinrand	Drunen	—	—	—	—	1 Michelin star	1 Michelin star	1 Michelin star	1 Michelin star	1 Michelin star	1 Michelin star
De Acht Zaligheden	Eersel	—	—	1 Michelin star	1 Michelin star	1 Michelin star	1 Michelin star	1 Michelin star	1 Michelin star	1 Michelin star	1 Michelin star
De Karpendonkse Hoeve	Eindhoven	1 Michelin star	1 Michelin star	1 Michelin star	1 Michelin star	1 Michelin star	1 Michelin star	1 Michelin star	1 Michelin star	1 Michelin star	1 Michelin star
Het Koetshuis Schuttersveld	Enschede	—	—	—	—	—	—	1 Michelin star	1 Michelin star	1 Michelin star	1 Michelin star
Twentsche Hoeve	Enter	—	—	1 Michelin star	1 Michelin star	1 Michelin star	1 Michelin star	1 Michelin star	1 Michelin star	—	—
Den Hoppenhof	Geldrop	—	—	1 Michelin star	1 Michelin star	1 Michelin star	—	—	—	—	—
Le Mérinos d'Or	Groningen	—	—	—	—	1 Michelin star	1 Michelin star	1 Michelin star	1 Michelin star	1 Michelin star	1 Michelin star
Hostellerie du Château	Heeze	1 Michelin star	1 Michelin star	1 Michelin star	1 Michelin star	1 Michelin star	1 Michelin star	1 Michelin star	1 Michelin star	1 Michelin star	1 Michelin star
Glastronome	Heiloo	1 Michelin star	1 Michelin star	1 Michelin star	1 Michelin star	1 Michelin star	—	Closed			
De Brave Hendrik	Hendrik-Ido-Ambacht	—	—	—	—	—	—	—	—	—	1 Michelin star
De Oude Rosmolen	Hoorn	—	—	—	—	—	1 Michelin star	1 Michelin star	1 Michelin star	1 Michelin star	2 Michelin stars
Inter Scaldes	Kruiningen	1 Michelin star	1 Michelin star	1 Michelin star	2 Michelin stars	2 Michelin stars	2 Michelin stars	2 Michelin stars	2 Michelin stars	2 Michelin stars	2 Michelin stars
Auberge la Provence	Laren	1 Michelin star	1 Michelin star	1 Michelin star	1 Michelin star	1 Michelin star	1 Michelin star	1 Michelin star	1 Michelin star	1 Michelin star	—
Oudt Leyden	Leiden	—	—	—	—	1 Michelin star	1 Michelin star	1 Michelin star	1 Michelin star	1 Michelin star	—
Chagall	Leidschendam	—	—	1 Michelin star	1 Michelin star	1 Michelin star	1 Michelin star	1 Michelin star	1 Michelin star	1 Michelin star	1 Michelin star
Villa Rozenrust	Leidschendam	1 Michelin star	1 Michelin star	1 Michelin star	1 Michelin star	1 Michelin star	1 Michelin star	1 Michelin star	1 Michelin star	1 Michelin star	—
De Kastanjehof	Lage Vuursche	—	—	—	—	—	—	—	—	—	1 Michelin star
Wilgenplas	Maarssen	—	—	—	—	—	—	—	1 Michelin star	1 Michelin star	1 Michelin star
Château Neercanne	Maastricht	1 Michelin star	1 Michelin star	—	—	—	1 Michelin star	1 Michelin star	1 Michelin star	1 Michelin star	1 Michelin star
De Hooge Heerlijkheid	Middelharnis	1 Michelin star	1 Michelin star	1 Michelin star	1 Michelin star	1 Michelin star	1 Michelin star	1 Michelin star	1 Michelin star	1 Michelin star	1 Michelin star
De Graaf van het Hoogveen	Noordwijk		1 Michelin star	1 Michelin star	1 Michelin star	1 Michelin star	1 Michelin star	1 Michelin star	1 Michelin star	—	—
De Beukenhof	Oegstgeest	1 Michelin star	1 Michelin star	1 Michelin star	2 Michelin stars	2 Michelin stars	2 Michelin stars	1 Michelin star	1 Michelin star	1 Michelin star	1 Michelin star
De Swaen	Oisterwijk	1 Michelin star	1 Michelin star	1 Michelin star	2 Michelin stars	2 Michelin stars	2 Michelin stars	2 Michelin stars	2 Michelin stars	2 Michelin stars	2 Michelin stars
De Wanne	Ootmarsum	—	—	—	—	1 Michelin star	1 Michelin star	1 Michelin star	1 Michelin star	—	—
Klein Paardenburg	Ouderkerk aan de Amstel	—	—	—	—	1 Michelin star	1 Michelin star	1 Michelin star	1 Michelin star	1 Michelin star	1 Michelin star
De Kromme Dissel	Heelsum	1 Michelin star	1 Michelin star	1 Michelin star	1 Michelin star	1 Michelin star	1 Michelin star	1 Michelin star	1 Michelin star	1 Michelin star	1 Michelin star
Coq d'Or	Rotterdam	1 Michelin star	1 Michelin star	1 Michelin star	1 Michelin star	1 Michelin star	1 Michelin star	1 Michelin star	1 Michelin star	1 Michelin star	—
La Vilette	Rotterdam	—	—	—	—	1 Michelin star	—	1 Michelin star	1 Michelin star	1 Michelin star	—
Parkheuvel	Rotterdam	—	—	—	—	—	—	—	—	—	1 Michelin star
Seinpost	Scheveningen	—	—	—	—	1 Michelin star	1 Michelin star	1 Michelin star	1 Michelin star	1 Michelin star	—
Thermidor	Kapellebrug, Hulst	1 Michelin star	—	—	—	—	—	—	—	—	—
De Lindenhorst	Valkenburg aan de Geul	—	—	1 Michelin star	1 Michelin star	1 Michelin star	1 Michelin star	1 Michelin star	1 Michelin star	1 Michelin star	1 Michelin star
Prinses Juliana	Valkenburg aan de Geul	2 Michelin stars	2 Michelin stars	2 Michelin stars	2 Michelin stars	2 Michelin stars	2 Michelin stars	2 Michelin stars	2 Michelin stars	1 Michelin star	1 Michelin star
Der Bloasbalg	Wahlwiller	—	—	—	—	1 Michelin star	1 Michelin star	1 Michelin star	1 Michelin star	1 Michelin star	1 Michelin star
't Klauwes	Wahlwiller	—	1 Michelin star	1 Michelin star	—	—	—	—	—	—	—
Auberge De Kieviet	Wassenaar	1 Michelin star	1 Michelin star	1 Michelin star	1 Michelin star	1 Michelin star	—	1 Michelin star	1 Michelin star	1 Michelin star	1 Michelin star
L'Auberge	Weert	—	—	—	—	—	1 Michelin star	1 Michelin star	1 Michelin star	1 Michelin star	1 Michelin star
Hostellerie De Hamert	Wellerlooi	1 Michelin star	1 Michelin star	1 Michelin star	1 Michelin star	1 Michelin star	1 Michelin star	1 Michelin star	1 Michelin star	1 Michelin star	—
Duurstede	Wijk bij Duurstede	1 Michelin star	1 Michelin star	1 Michelin star	1 Michelin star	1 Michelin star	1 Michelin star	1 Michelin star	1 Michelin star	1 Michelin star	1 Michelin star
Kasteel Wittem	Wittem	1 Michelin star	1 Michelin star	1 Michelin star	1 Michelin star	1 Michelin star	1 Michelin star	1 Michelin star	1 Michelin star	1 Michelin star	—
't Veerhuis	Wolphaartsdijk	1 Michelin star	1 Michelin star	1 Michelin star	1 Michelin star	1 Michelin star	1 Michelin star	1 Michelin star	1 Michelin star	—	—
Nolet Het Reymerswale	Yerseke	1 Michelin star	1 Michelin star	1 Michelin star	1 Michelin star	1 Michelin star	1 Michelin star	1 Michelin star	1 Michelin star	1 Michelin star	1 Michelin star
De Hoop Op d’Swarte Walvis	Zaandijk	—	—	—	—	—	1 Michelin star	1 Michelin star	1 Michelin star	1 Michelin star	1 Michelin star
Schuddebeurs	Schuddebeurs, Zierikzee	—	—	—	—	—	1 Michelin star	—	—	—	—
Les Quatre Saisons	Zuidlaren	1 Michelin star	1 Michelin star	1 Michelin star	1 Michelin star	1 Michelin star	—	—	—	—	—
De Bokkepruik	Zweeloo	—	—	—	—	—	—	—	—	—	1 Michelin star
Reference											

== 1971–1980 ==
Key
1 Michelin star	One Michelin star
2 Michelin stars	Two Michelin stars
—	The restaurant did not receive a star that year
Closed	The restaurant is no longer open

Michelin-starred restaurants
Name	Location	1971	1972	1973	1974	1975	1976	1977	1978	1979	1980
Rôtisserie Rue du Bois	Alkmaar	—	—	—	—	—	—	—	—	1 Michelin star	—
De Witte	Amersfoort	1 Michelin star	1 Michelin star	1 Michelin star	1 Michelin star	1 Michelin star	1 Michelin star	1 Michelin star	1 Michelin star	1 Michelin star	1 Michelin star
Ile de France	Amstelveen	—	—	—	—	1 Michelin star	1 Michelin star	1 Michelin star	1 Michelin star	1 Michelin star	1 Michelin star
Auberge	Amsterdam	—	—	—	—	—	—	—	—	—	1 Michelin star
De Boerderij	Amsterdam	—	—	—	—	—	—	—	—	—	1 Michelin star
Gravenmolen	Amsterdam	—	1 Michelin star	1 Michelin star	1 Michelin star	1 Michelin star	1 Michelin star	—	—	—	—
De Echoput	Apeldoorn	1 Michelin star	1 Michelin star	1 Michelin star	1 Michelin star	1 Michelin star	1 Michelin star	1 Michelin star	1 Michelin star	1 Michelin star	1 Michelin star
La Diligence	Beek	—	—	—	—	—	—	—	—	1 Michelin star	1 Michelin star
De Oude Geleerde Man	Bennebroek	—	—	—	—	—	—	—	—	—	1 Michelin star
De Bokkedoorns	Overveen	—	—	—	— (Note: No secondary proof that they had a star in this year)	—	—	—	1 Michelin star	1 Michelin star	1 Michelin star
Kaatje bij de Sluis	Blokzijl	—	—	—	—	—	—	—	1 Michelin star	1 Michelin star	1 Michelin star
De Hoefslag	Bosch en Duin	—	—	—	—	—	—	—	—	1 Michelin star	1 Michelin star
Carelshaven	Delden	—	—	1 Michelin star	1 Michelin star	1 Michelin star	1 Michelin star	1 Michelin star	1 Michelin star	1 Michelin star	1 Michelin star
Le Chevalier	Delft	—	—	—	—	—	—	—	—	—	1 Michelin star
Chalet Royal	Den Bosch	1 Michelin star	1 Michelin star	1 Michelin star	1 Michelin star	1 Michelin star	1 Michelin star	—	—	—	—
Saur	The Hague	1 Michelin star	1 Michelin star	1 Michelin star	1 Michelin star	1 Michelin star	1 Michelin star	1 Michelin star	1 Michelin star	1 Michelin star	1 Michelin star
Queens Garden, Parkhotel	The Hague	1 Michelin star	—	—	—	—	—	—	—	—	—
The House of Lords	The Hague	1 Michelin star	1 Michelin star	1 Michelin star	1 Michelin star	1 Michelin star	—	—	—	—	—
Beaulieu, Doorwerth Castle	Doorwerth	1 Michelin star	1 Michelin star	1 Michelin star	1 Michelin star	1 Michelin star	1 Michelin star	1 Michelin star	1 Michelin star	1 Michelin star	—
De Karpendonkse Hoeve	Eindhoven	—	—	—	—	—	—	—	—	1 Michelin star	1 Michelin star
Twentsche Hoeve	Enter	—	—	—	2 Michelin stars	2 Michelin stars	1 Michelin star	1 Michelin star	1 Michelin star	1 Michelin star	1 Michelin star
Truite d'Or	Gulpen	—	—	—	—	—	—	1 Michelin star	1 Michelin star	1 Michelin star	1 Michelin star
Hostellerie du Château	Heeze	—	—	—	—	—	—	—	—	—	1 Michelin star
Glastronome	Heiloo	—	—	—	—	—	—	—	—	—	1 Michelin star
Inter Scaldes	Kruiningen	—	—	—	—	—	—	—	1 Michelin star	1 Michelin star	1 Michelin star
De Deyselhof	Landsmeer	—	—	—	1 Michelin star	1 Michelin star	Closed				
Auberge la Provence	Laren	—	—	—	1 Michelin star	1 Michelin star	1 Michelin star	1 Michelin star	1 Michelin star	1 Michelin star	1 Michelin star
Oudt Leyden	Leiden	1 Michelin star	1 Michelin star	1 Michelin star	1 Michelin star	1 Michelin star	1 Michelin star	1 Michelin star	1 Michelin star	1 Michelin star	—
Villa Rozenrust	Leidschendam	—	—	—	—	—	1 Michelin star	1 Michelin star	1 Michelin star	1 Michelin star	1 Michelin star
Wilgenplas	Maarssen	—	1 Michelin star	1 Michelin star	—	—	—	—	—	—	—
Château Neercanne	Maastricht	2 Michelin stars	2 Michelin stars	2 Michelin stars	2 Michelin stars	2 Michelin stars	2 Michelin stars	2 Michelin stars	1 Michelin star	1 Michelin star	1 Michelin star
Chez Jacques	Maastricht	—	—	—	—	—	1 Michelin star	1 Michelin star	1 Michelin star	1 Michelin star	1 Michelin star
Au Coin des Bons Enfants	Maastricht	1 Michelin star	1 Michelin star	1 Michelin star	1 Michelin star	1 Michelin star	1 Michelin star	1 Michelin star	1 Michelin star	1 Michelin star	1 Michelin star
De Hooge Heerlijkheid	Middelharnis	—	—	—	1 Michelin star	—	1 Michelin star	1 Michelin star	1 Michelin star	1 Michelin star	1 Michelin star
De Beukenhof	Oegstgeest	1 Michelin star	1 Michelin star	1 Michelin star	1 Michelin star	1 Michelin star	—	—	—	—	—
Klein Paardenburg	Ouderkerk aan de Amstel	—	—	—	—	—	1 Michelin star	1 Michelin star	1 Michelin star	1 Michelin star	—
Het Oude Jachthuis	Eursinge, Pesse	1 Michelin star	1 Michelin star	1 Michelin star	1 Michelin star	1 Michelin star	1 Michelin star	1 Michelin star	1 Michelin star	1 Michelin star	1 Michelin star
De Kromme Dissel	Heelsum	1 Michelin star	1 Michelin star	1 Michelin star	1 Michelin star	1 Michelin star	1 Michelin star	1 Michelin star	1 Michelin star	1 Michelin star	1 Michelin star
Coq d'Or	Rotterdam	1 Michelin star	1 Michelin star	1 Michelin star	1 Michelin star	1 Michelin star	1 Michelin star	1 Michelin star	1 Michelin star	1 Michelin star	1 Michelin star
Old Dutch	Rotterdam	1 Michelin star	1 Michelin star	1 Michelin star	1 Michelin star	—	—	—	—	—	—
De Witte Holevoet	Scherpenzeel	1 Michelin star	1 Michelin star	1 Michelin star	1 Michelin star	1 Michelin star	1 Michelin star	1 Michelin star	1 Michelin star	1 Michelin star	—
Thermidor	Kapellebrug, Hulst	—	—	1 Michelin star	—	1 Michelin star	1 Michelin star	1 Michelin star	1 Michelin star	1 Michelin star	1 Michelin star
Prinses Juliana	Valkenburg aan de Geul	2 Michelin stars	2 Michelin stars	2 Michelin stars	1 Michelin star	1 Michelin star	2 Michelin stars	2 Michelin stars	2 Michelin stars	2 Michelin stars	2 Michelin stars
Auberge De Kieviet	Wassenaar	2 Michelin stars	2 Michelin stars	1 Michelin star	—	—	1 Michelin star	1 Michelin star	1 Michelin star	1 Michelin star	1 Michelin star
Hostellerie De Hamert	Wellerlooi	1 Michelin star	1 Michelin star	1 Michelin star	1 Michelin star	1 Michelin star	1 Michelin star	1 Michelin star	1 Michelin star	1 Michelin star	1 Michelin star
Duurstede	Wijk bij Duurstede	—	—	—	—	—	—	1 Michelin star	1 Michelin star	1 Michelin star	1 Michelin star
Kasteel Wittem	Wittem	—	—	—	—	—	—	1 Michelin star	1 Michelin star	1 Michelin star	1 Michelin star
't Veerhuis	Wolphaartsdijk	—	—	—	—	—	1 Michelin star	1 Michelin star	1 Michelin star	1 Michelin star	1 Michelin star
Nolet Het Reymerswale	Yerseke	—	—	—	—	—	1 Michelin star	1 Michelin star	1 Michelin star	1 Michelin star	1 Michelin star
Reference											

== 1957–1970 ==
Key
1 Michelin star	One Michelin star
2 Michelin stars	Two Michelin stars
—	The restaurant did not receive a star that year

Michelin-starred restaurants
Name	Location	1957	1958	1959	1960	1961	1962	1963	1964	1965	1966	1967	1968	1969	1970
De Witte	Amersfoort	—	—	—	1 Michelin star	1 Michelin star	1 Michelin star	1 Michelin star	1 Michelin star	1 Michelin star	1 Michelin star	1 Michelin star	1 Michelin star	1 Michelin star	1 Michelin star
Adrian	Amsterdam	—	—	—	—	—	—	—	—	—	—	1 Michelin star	1 Michelin star	1 Michelin star	1 Michelin star
Apollo	Amsterdam	—	—	—	—	—	—	—	—	—	—	1 Michelin star	1 Michelin star	—	—
De Boerderij	Amsterdam	—	—	—	—	1 Michelin star	1 Michelin star	1 Michelin star	1 Michelin star	1 Michelin star	1 Michelin star	1 Michelin star	—	—	—
Dikker & Thijs	Amsterdam	1 Michelin star	1 Michelin star	1 Michelin star	1 Michelin star	1 Michelin star	1 Michelin star	—	—	—	—	—	—	—	—
Excelsior	Amsterdam	1 Michelin star	1 Michelin star	1 Michelin star	1 Michelin star	1 Michelin star	1 Michelin star	1 Michelin star	1 Michelin star	1 Michelin star	1 Michelin star	1 Michelin star	1 Michelin star	1 Michelin star	1 Michelin star
Mirabelle	Breda	—	—	1 Michelin star	1 Michelin star	1 Michelin star	1 Michelin star	1 Michelin star	1 Michelin star	1 Michelin star	1 Michelin star	1 Michelin star	—	—	—
Hotel Princeville	Breda	—	—	—	1 Michelin star	1 Michelin star	1 Michelin star	1 Michelin star	1 Michelin star	1 Michelin star	1 Michelin star	1 Michelin star	—	—	—
Chalet Royal	Den Bosch	—	1 Michelin star	1 Michelin star	1 Michelin star	1 Michelin star	1 Michelin star	1 Michelin star	1 Michelin star	1 Michelin star	1 Michelin star	1 Michelin star	1 Michelin star	1 Michelin star	1 Michelin star
Royal	The Hague	—	1 Michelin star	1 Michelin star	1 Michelin star	1 Michelin star	1 Michelin star	1 Michelin star	1 Michelin star	1 Michelin star	1 Michelin star	1 Michelin star	1 Michelin star	—	—
Saur	The Hague	—	1 Michelin star	1 Michelin star	—	—	—	—	—	—	—	1 Michelin star	1 Michelin star	1 Michelin star	1 Michelin star
Queens Garden	The Hague	—	—	—	1 Michelin star	1 Michelin star	1 Michelin star	1 Michelin star	1 Michelin star	1 Michelin star	1 Michelin star	1 Michelin star	1 Michelin star	1 Michelin star	1 Michelin star
Hoornwijck	The Hague	—	1 Michelin star	1 Michelin star	—	—	—	—	—	—	—	—	—	—	—
The House of Lords	The Hague	—	—	—	1 Michelin star	1 Michelin star	1 Michelin star	1 Michelin star	1 Michelin star	1 Michelin star	1 Michelin star	1 Michelin star	1 Michelin star	1 Michelin star	1 Michelin star
De Waag	Doesburg	—	—	—	—	—	—	—	—	1 Michelin star	1 Michelin star	—	—	—	—
Beaulieu, Doorwerth Castle	Doorwerth	—	—	—	—	—	—	—	—	—	1 Michelin star	1 Michelin star	1 Michelin star	1 Michelin star	1 Michelin star
Carré des Champ.	Eindhoven	—	—	—	—	1 Michelin star	1 Michelin star	1 Michelin star	1 Michelin star	—	—	—	—	—	—
De Kempen	Heeze	—	—	—	—	—	—	—	—	—	—	1 Michelin star	1 Michelin star	1 Michelin star	—
Oudt Leyden	Leiden	1 Michelin star	1 Michelin star	1 Michelin star	1 Michelin star	1 Michelin star	1 Michelin star	1 Michelin star	1 Michelin star	1 Michelin star	1 Michelin star	1 Michelin star	1 Michelin star	1 Michelin star	1 Michelin star
Château Neercanne	Maastricht	1 Michelin star	1 Michelin star	1 Michelin star	1 Michelin star	1 Michelin star	1 Michelin star	1 Michelin star	1 Michelin star	1 Michelin star	1 Michelin star	2 Michelin stars	2 Michelin stars	2 Michelin stars	2 Michelin stars
Au Coin des Bons Enfants	Maastricht	—	1 Michelin star	1 Michelin star	1 Michelin star	1 Michelin star	1 Michelin star	1 Michelin star	1 Michelin star	1 Michelin star	1 Michelin star	1 Michelin star	1 Michelin star	1 Michelin star	1 Michelin star
De Beukenhof	Oegstgeest	2 Michelin stars	2 Michelin stars	2 Michelin stars	2 Michelin stars	2 Michelin stars	2 Michelin stars	2 Michelin stars	2 Michelin stars	2 Michelin stars	1 Michelin star	1 Michelin star	1 Michelin star	1 Michelin star	1 Michelin star
Het Oude Jachthuis	Eursinge, Pesse	—	—	—	—	—	—	—	—	—	1 Michelin star	1 Michelin star	1 Michelin star	1 Michelin star	1 Michelin star
Coq d'Or	Rotterdam	1 Michelin star	1 Michelin star	1 Michelin star	1 Michelin star	1 Michelin star	1 Michelin star	1 Michelin star	1 Michelin star	1 Michelin star	1 Michelin star	1 Michelin star	1 Michelin star	1 Michelin star	1 Michelin star
Old Dutch	Rotterdam	1 Michelin star	1 Michelin star	1 Michelin star	1 Michelin star	1 Michelin star	1 Michelin star	1 Michelin star	1 Michelin star	1 Michelin star	1 Michelin star	1 Michelin star	1 Michelin star	1 Michelin star	1 Michelin star
Witte Paard	Rotterdam	—	—	—	—	—	—	—	—	1 Michelin star	—	—	—	—	—
De Witte Holevoet	Scherpenzeel	—	—	—	—	—	1 Michelin star	1 Michelin star	1 Michelin star	1 Michelin star	1 Michelin star	1 Michelin star	1 Michelin star	1 Michelin star	1 Michelin star
Prinses Juliana	Valkenburg aan de Geul	—	1 Michelin star	1 Michelin star	2 Michelin stars	2 Michelin stars	2 Michelin stars	2 Michelin stars	2 Michelin stars	2 Michelin stars	2 Michelin stars	2 Michelin stars	2 Michelin stars	2 Michelin stars	2 Michelin stars
't Koetshuis	Rhenen	2 Michelin stars	2 Michelin stars	2 Michelin stars	2 Michelin stars	2 Michelin stars	2 Michelin stars	2 Michelin stars	2 Michelin stars	1 Michelin star	1 Michelin star	2 Michelin stars	2 Michelin stars	2 Michelin stars	2 Michelin stars
Ronde Venen	Vinkeveen	—	—	—	—	—	—	1 Michelin star	—	1 Michelin star	1 Michelin star	1 Michelin star	—	—	—
De Put	Vlissingen	—	—	—	—	—	—	—	1 Michelin star	1 Michelin star	—	—	—	—	—
De Nederlanden	Vreeland	—	1 Michelin star	1 Michelin star	—	—	—	—	—	—	—	—	—	—	—
Belmonte, De Wageningse Berg	Wageningen	—	—	—	—	—	—	—	—	1 Michelin star	1 Michelin star	1 Michelin star	—	—	—
Auberge De Kieviet	Wassenaar	—	—	—	—	1 Michelin star	1 Michelin star	1 Michelin star	1 Michelin star	1 Michelin star	1 Michelin star	1 Michelin star	1 Michelin star	1 Michelin star	2 Michelin stars
Hostellerie De Hamert	Wellerlooi	—	—	—	—	—	—	1 Michelin star	1 Michelin star	1 Michelin star	1 Michelin star	1 Michelin star	1 Michelin star	1 Michelin star	1 Michelin star
Reference															

== See also ==
- List of Michelin 3-star restaurants
- List of restaurants in Amsterdam
- List of restaurants in Rotterdam
- Lists of restaurants

== Bibliography ==
- 1979 Michelin Benelux. Clermont-Ferrand: Michelin et Cie. 1979. ISBN 2-06-006099-0.
- 1985 Michelin Benelux. Clermont-Ferrand: Michelin et Cie. 1985. ISBN 2-06-006055-9.
- 1993 Michelin Benelux. Clermont-Ferrand: Michelin et Cie. 1993. ISBN 2-06-006039-7.
- 2001 Michelin Benelux. Clermont-Ferrand: Michelin et Cie. 2001. ISBN 2-06-000298-2.
- 2003 Michelin Benelux. Clermont-Ferrand: Michelin et Cie. 2003. ISBN 2-06-100699-X.
- Michelin Guide Netherlands 2007. Clermont-Ferrand: Michelin et Cie. 2007. ISBN 978-2-06-712249-9.
- Michelin Guide Netherlands 2009. Clermont-Ferrand: Michelin et Cie. 2009. ISBN 978-2-06-713833-9.
- Michelin Guide Netherlands 2015. Michelin Editions des Voyages. 2015. ISBN 978-2-06-719713-8.
- Michelin Guide Netherlands 2016. Michelin Editions des Voyages. 2016. ISBN 978-2-06-720300-6.
- Michelin Guide Netherlands 2017. Michelin Editions des Voyages. 2017. ISBN 978-2-06-721476-7.
- Michelin Guide Netherlands 2018. Michelin Editions des Voyages. 2018. ISBN 978-2-06-722381-3.
- Michelin Guide Netherlands 2019. Michelin Editions des Voyages. 2019. ISBN 978-2-06-723338-6.
- Michelin Guide Netherlands 2020. Michelin Editions des Voyages. 2020. ISBN 978-2-06-724192-3.
