= Klein Paardenburg =

Coordinates: 52°17′51.69″N 4°53′57.84″E

Bistro Klein Paardenburg
- Interactive map of Bistro Klein Paardenburg

Restaurant information
- Established: 1967
- Rating: Michelin Guide
- Location: , Ouderkerk aan de Amstel, Netherlands

Bistro Klein Paardenburg was a restaurant in Ouderkerk aan de Amstel, in the Netherlands. It was a fine dining restaurant that was awarded one Michelin star in 1976 and retained that rating until 1979. In 1985, it was again awarded a Michelin star and retained that rating until 1990. The restaurant was unexpectedly closed down on 31 January 2011, for no obvious reason.

Klein Paardenburg was founded by Ton Fagel in 1967. He sold the restaurant in 1999.

== See also ==
- List of Michelin starred restaurants in the Netherlands
