= Gravenmolen =

Former restaurant in Amsterdam

Coordinates: 52°22′34.05″N 4°53′30.89″E

- Interactive map of Gravenmolen

Restaurant information
- Established: November 1969
- Closed: before 1981
- Head chef: Cees Gravendaal
- Location: Lijnbaansteeg 5-7, Amsterdam, Netherlands
- Website: www.gravenmolen.be

Gravenmolen is a defunct restaurant in Amsterdam, Netherlands. It was a fine dining restaurant that was awarded one Michelin star in 1972 and retained that rating until 1976.

Head chef in the period of the Michelin star was Cees Gravendeel. Other head chefs mentioned: mr. Esvelt (1978) and A. Koene (undated).

== See also ==
- List of Michelin starred restaurants in the Netherlands
