= Het Koetshuis Schuttersveld =

Coordinates: 52°13′26.12″N 6°53′4.08″E

- Interactive map of Het Koetshuis Schuttersveld

Restaurant information
- Closed: February 2009
- Head chef: Fred Bohnke
- Food type: French
- Rating: Michelin Guide
- Location: Hengelosestraat 111, Enschede, 7514 AE, Netherlands
- Seating capacity: 45

Het Koetshuis Schuttersveld is a defunct restaurant in Enschede, Netherlands. It was a fine dining restaurant that was awarded one Michelin star in 1987 and retained that rating until 2001.

Owner and head chef Fred Böhnke closed the restaurant in February 2009, after 32 years. He cited the smoking ban and the recession as the reason for his demise of the restaurant. Böhnke followed the advice of his bank and closed the restaurant before going bankrupt.

The restaurant was located in the former coach house (Dutch: Koetshuis) of the villa Schuttersveld, built in 1823. Originally the restaurant was named Het Koetshuis and located at the address "Walstraat 48".

Het Koetshuis Schuttersveld was a member of Alliance Gastronomique Neerlandaise in the period 1991–2006.

== See also ==
- List of Michelin starred restaurants in the Netherlands
