= Wilgenplas =

Coordinates: 52°8′47.88″N 5°3′41.07″E

- Interactive map of Wilgenplas

Restaurant information
- Established: 1965
- Closed: 2000
- Chef: Henny van der Veer
- Food type: French
- Rating: Michelin Guide
- Location: Maarsseveensevaart 7-a, Maarssen, 3601 CC, Netherlands

Restaurant Wilgenplas is a defunct restaurant in Maarssen, in the Netherlands. It was a fine dining restaurant that was awarded one Michelin star in both 1972 and 1973. It was again awarded a Michelin star in 1988 and retained that rating until 2000.

During the second star-period, head chef was Henny van der Veer

Restaurant De Wilgenplas closed down in 2000, due to bankruptcy.

== See also ==
- List of Michelin starred restaurants in the Netherlands
