= De Saffraan =

Coordinates: 52°9′37.92″N 5°22′57″E

- Interactive map of De Saffraan

Restaurant information
- Established: August 2007
- Head chef: Kars van Wechem
- Food type: French, International
- Rating: Michelin Guide
- Location: Kleine Koppel 3, Amersfoort, 3812 PG, Netherlands
- Seating capacity: 60
- Website: Official website

De Saffraan is a restaurant located in Amersfoort in the Netherlands. It is a fine dining restaurant that was awarded one Michelin star in the period 2010–2014.

GaultMillau awarded the restaurant 15 out of 20 points.

Owner and head chef of De Saffraan is Kars van Wechem.

The restaurant is located in a 100-year-old clipper named "Hoop op Welvaart", which is moored at a quay of Kleine Koppel in Amersfoort. The clipper is completely renovated and adjusted to its role as restaurant.

== Awards ==
- Michelin star 2009–2014
- Best restaurant at culinair festival Proef Amersfoort, 2009

== See also ==
- List of Michelin starred restaurants in the Netherlands
