= De Oude Geleerde Man =

Coordinates: 52°19′29.23″N 4°35′42.18″E

- Interactive map of De Oude Geleerde Man

Restaurant information
- Rating: Michelin Guide
- Location: Rijksstraatweg 51, Bennebroek, Netherlands

Restaurant De Oude Geleerde Man is a defunct restaurant in Bennebroek, in the Netherlands. It was a fine dining restaurant that was awarded one Michelin star in 1980 and retained that rating until 1990. The restaurant closed down shortly after 1991.

In 1970, Arie Siliakus became the owner. In 1990 he sold the restaurant to buy De Hoop op d’Swarte Walvis. In the period 1981-1986 Jean Jacques Menanteau was head chef.

Since 2009, a Chinese-Japanese restaurant has been housed at the former location of De Oude Geleerde Man. This continues a tradition as a stopping point and restaurant at this address since 1683.

De Oude Geleerde Man is subject of the poem Lofzang aan de Oude Geleerde Man by Gerrit van Lennep (1774-1833).

== See also ==
- List of Michelin starred restaurants in the Netherlands
