= Glastronome =

Defunct Dutch restaurant

Coordinates: 52°34′19.3″N 4°41′36.94″E

- Interactive map of Glastronome

Restaurant information
- Closed: 1987
- Food type: French
- Location: Rijksweg 100, Limmen, 1906 BK, Netherlands

Glastronome is a defunct restaurant in Limmen, in the Netherlands. It was a fine dining restaurant that was awarded one Michelin star in 1980 and retained that rating until 1985.

Head chef in the time of the Michelin star was Jaap Istha.

Restaurant Glastronome closed down in 1987.

== See also ==
- List of Michelin starred restaurants in the Netherlands
