= De Grië =

Coordinates: 53°23′55.59″N 5°15′15.27″E

- Interactive map of De Grië

Restaurant information
- Established: 1985
- Head chef: Joos van Strien
- Food type: French
- Location: Badweg 4, Oosterend, Terschelling, 8881 HB, Netherlands
- Seating capacity: 45
- Website: Official website

De Grië is a restaurant located in Oosterend, Terschelling, in the Netherlands. It is a fine dining restaurant that was awarded one Michelin star in 1993 and retained that rating until 2005. For 2007, it was again awarded a Michelin star.

Head chef of De Grië is Joos van Strien. In the time of the Michelin star, Ton van Scheppingen was the head chef.

The restaurant was originally located at "Hoofdstraat 43" in Oosterend. In 2006 the restaurant moved to the new hotel Paal 8 Hotel aan Zee. Due to the move, the restaurant lost its Michelin star but won it back a year later. After a disagreement with the interim-management, Van Scheppingen left the restaurant in July 2007. Consequently, the restaurant lost its star.

== See also ==
- List of Michelin starred restaurants in the Netherlands
