= De Put (restaurant) =

Coordinates: 51°26′55.45″N 3°33′41.23″E

- Interactive map of De Put

Restaurant information
- Established: 1960
- Closed: 1974
- Location: Boulevard Evertsen 2-4, Vlissingen, Netherlands

Restaurant De Put is a defunct restaurant, located in the cellars of the now demolished Strandhotel in Vlissingen, Netherlands. It was a fine dining restaurant that was awarded one Michelin star in both 1964 and 1965. The restaurant closed in 1974, due to dike reinforcement.

Head chef of the restaurant was Willem Vader.

== See also ==
- List of Michelin starred restaurants in the Netherlands
