= Adrian (restaurant) =

Coordinates: 52°21′59.91″N 4°53′26.65″E

- Interactive map of Adrian

Restaurant information
- Established: 1947
- Closed: After 1992
- Location: Reguliersdwarsstraat 21, Amsterdam, 1017 BJ, Netherlands
- Seating capacity: 30

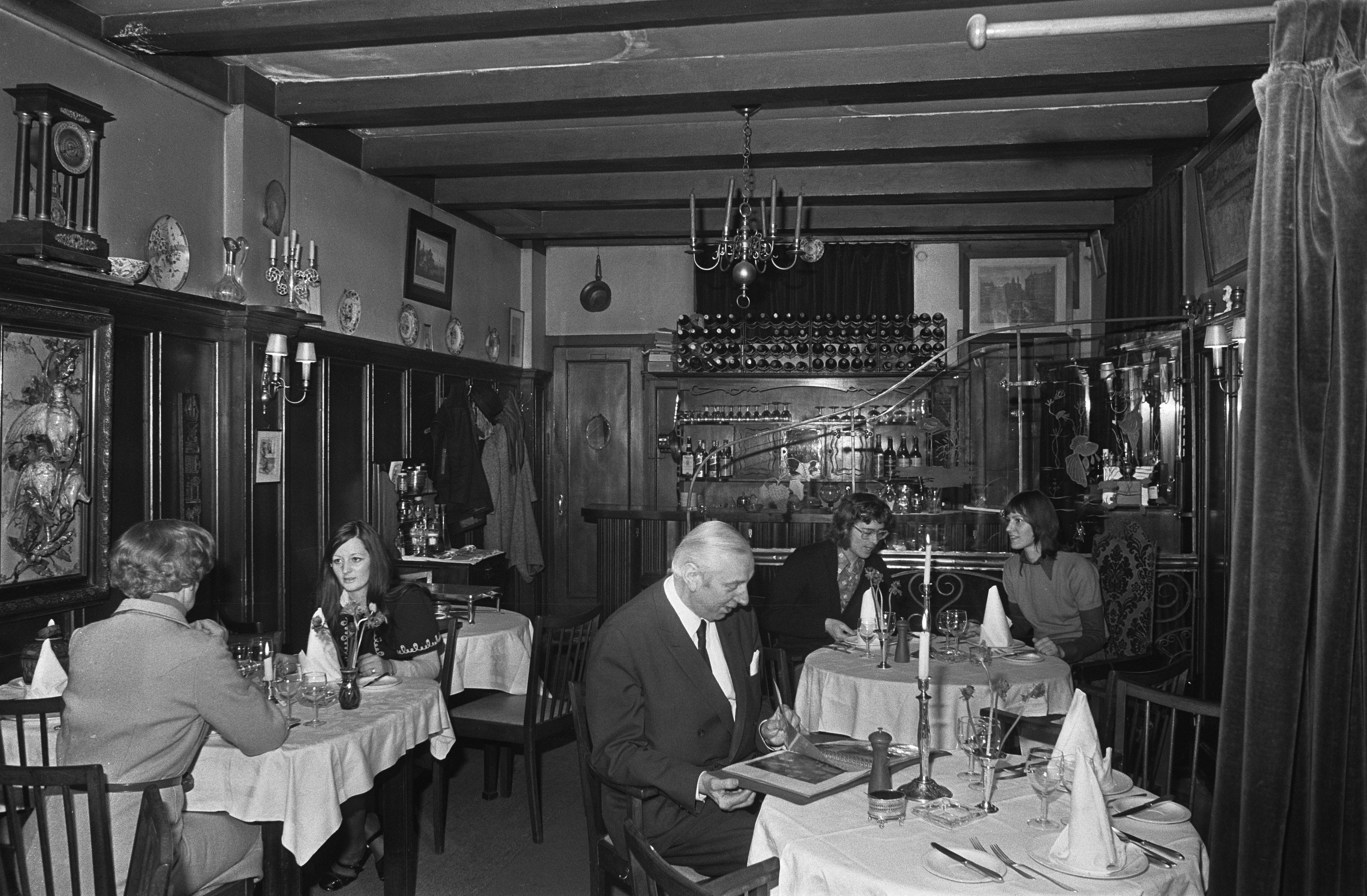

Restaurant Adrian is a defunct restaurant in Amsterdam, Netherlands. It was a fine dining restaurant that was awarded one Michelin star in 1967 and retained that rating until 1970.

== See also ==
- List of Michelin-starred restaurants in the Netherlands
