= Wolfslaar Restaurant =

Coordinates: 51°33′38.19″N 4°48′17.54″E

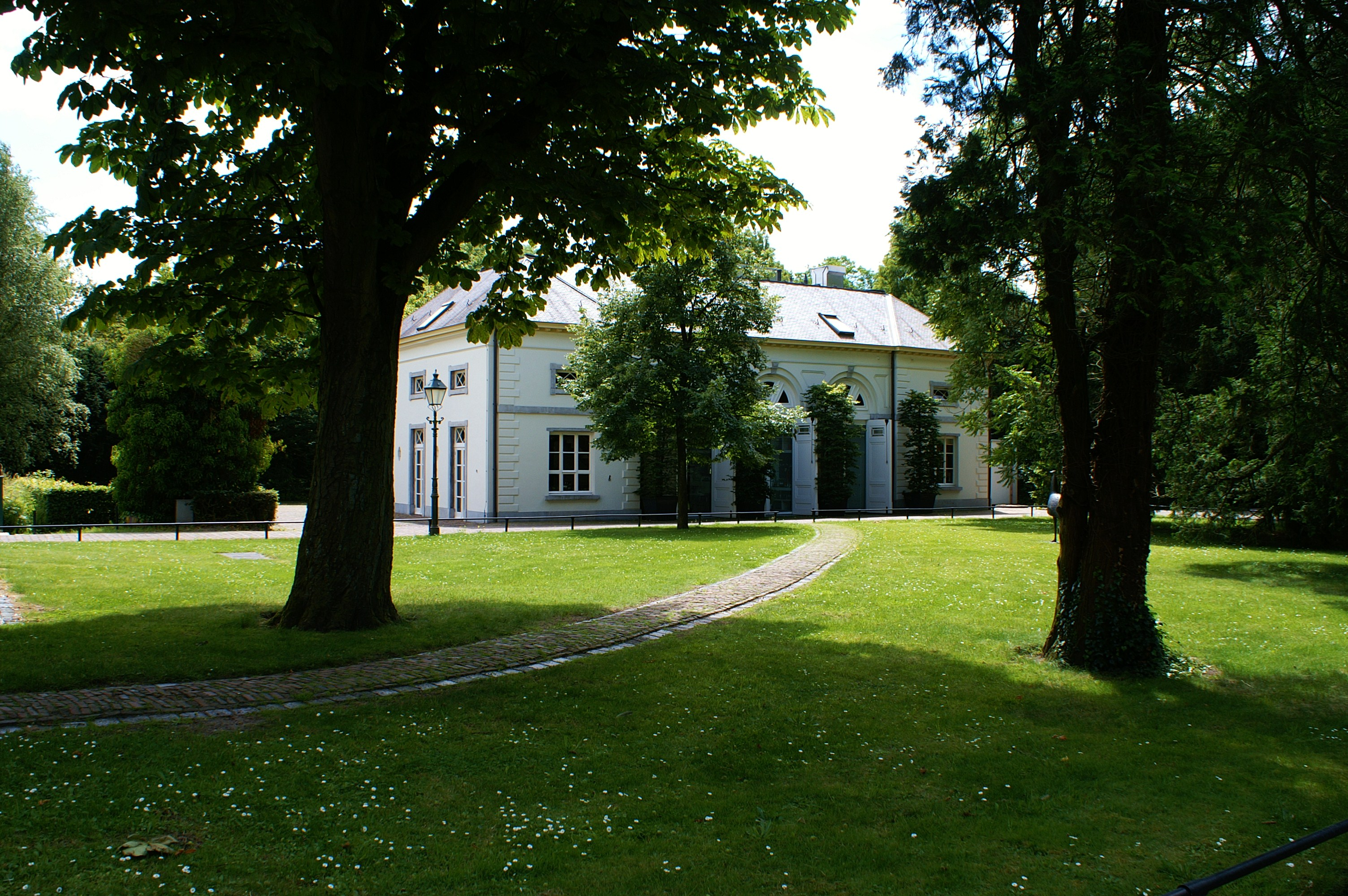
- Interactive map of Wolfslaar Restaurant

Restaurant information
- Established: 2000
- Head chef: Maarten Camps
- Food type: French
- Rating: Michelin Guide
- Location: Wolfslaardreef 100, Breda, 4834 SP, Netherlands
- Seating capacity: 60
- Website: Official website (Dutch)

Wolfslaar Restaurant is a restaurant in Breda, Netherlands. It is a fine dining restaurant that was awarded one Michelin star in 2005 and retained that rating until present.

In 2013, GaultMillau awarded the restaurant 15 out of 20 points.

Head chef of Wolfslaar Restaurant is Maarten Camps.

The restaurant is located in the coach house of the Wolfslaar Estate. In 2011, the restaurant temporarily moved to the manor of the estate while the coach house was renovated. Most parts of the estate are Rijksmonuments, including the coach house itself.

== See also ==
- List of Michelin starred restaurants in the Netherlands
