= Het Groot Paradijs =

Coordinates: 51°30′0.98″N 3°37′0.05″E

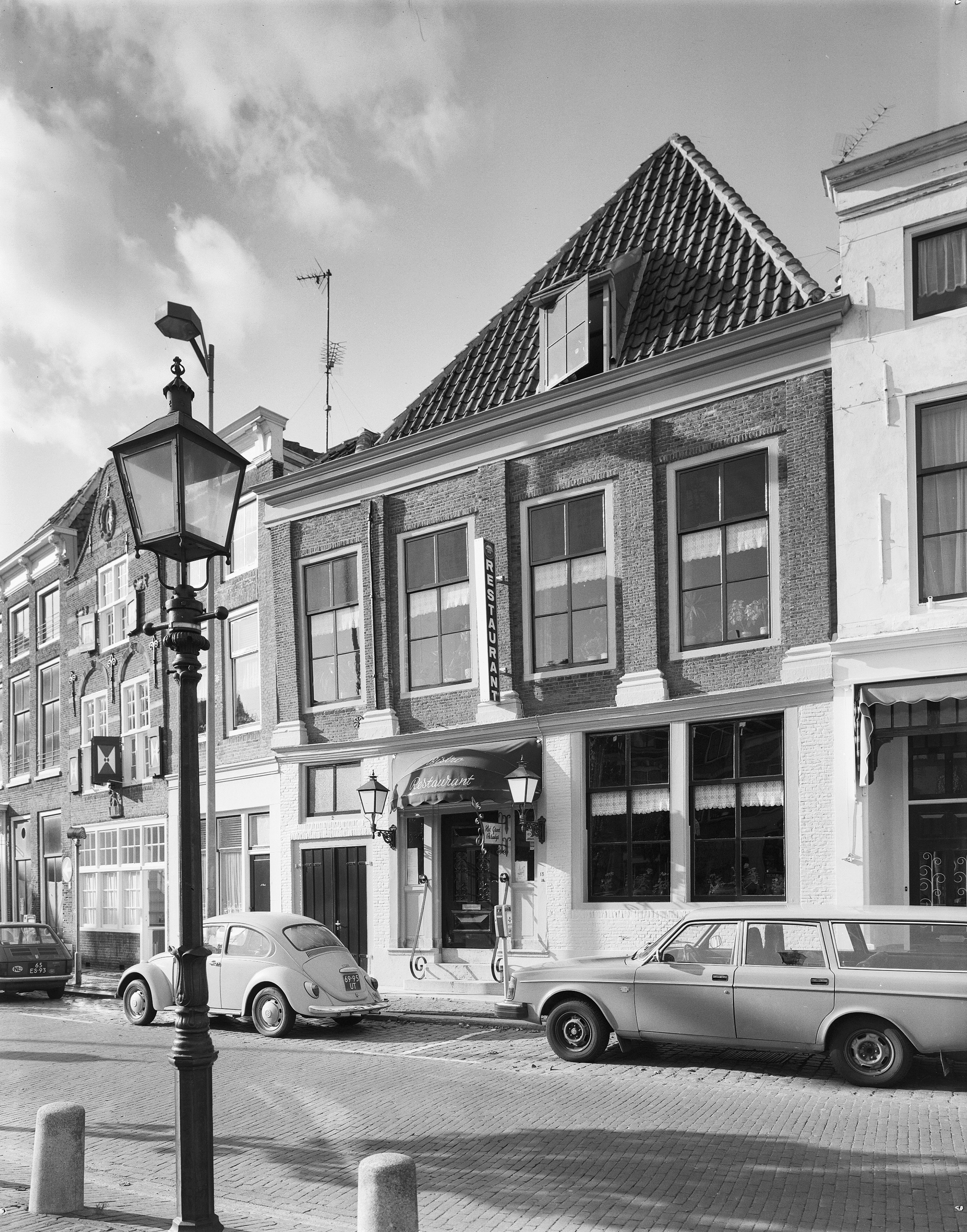
- Interactive map of Het Groot Paradijs

Restaurant information
- Established: 1980
- Closed: 2007
- Head chef: Ferdie Dolk
- Food type: French
- Rating: Michelin Guide
- Location: Damplein 13, Middelburg, 4331 GC, Netherlands

Het Groot Paradijs is a defunct restaurant in Middelburg, in the Netherlands. It was a fine dining restaurant that was awarded one Michelin star in 1996 and retained that rating until 2002. For 2007, it was again awarded a Michelin star.

The owner and head chef of Het Groot Paradijs was Ferdie Dolk.

In the first star period, 1996–2002, Ron Henderikse was head chef.

The restaurant closed in 2007, with the owners opening a new restaurant in Domburg.

The restaurant is housed in a Rijksmonument.

== See also ==
- List of Michelin starred restaurants in the Netherlands
