= Hostellerie du Château =

Coordinates: 51°22′59.47″N 5°34′48.58″E

- Interactive map of Hostellerie du Château

Restaurant information
- Rating: Michelin Guide
- Location: Kapelstraat 48, Heeze, 5591 HE, Netherlands

Hostellerie du Château is a defunct restaurant in Heeze, in the Netherlands. It was a fine dining restaurant that was awarded one Michelin star in 1980 and retained that rating until 1990.

Frans Gerrits was head chef in the time the restaurant had its Michelin star. Hans Huisman took over, but could not retain the Michelin star.

Hostellerie du Château is succeeded by Hostellerie Vangaelen.

== See also ==
- List of Michelin starred restaurants in the Netherlands
