= Chez Jacques =

Coordinates: 50°50′58.44″N 5°41′6.45″E

- Interactive map of Chez Jacques

Restaurant information
- Established: 1969
- Closed: 1979
- Head chef: Jacques Zeguers
- Location: Brusselsestraat 15, Maastricht, Netherlands

Bistro Chez Jacques is a defunct restaurant in Maastricht, Netherlands. It was a fine dining restaurant that was awarded one Michelin star in 1976 and retained that rating until 1979.

Its owner and head chef was Jacques Zeguers.

In January 1973, Zeguers was offered a brown bear for his restaurant. Zeguers accepted the bear and served it. Self-styled animal protector and arms dealer Pistolen Paultje (officially Paul Wilking) was not happy with that and threatened to thrash the restaurant when he dared to serve a second bear.

== See also ==
- List of Michelin starred restaurants in the Netherlands
