= Ile de France (restaurant) =

- Interactive map of Ile de France

Restaurant information
- Food type: French
- Rating: Michelin Guide
- Location: Pieter Lastmanweg 9, Amstelveen, 1181 XG, Netherlands

Ile de France is a defunct restaurant in Amstelveen, in the Netherlands. It was a fine dining restaurant that was awarded one Michelin star in 1975 and retained that rating until 1990.

In 1975, head chef was P.J. de Laar.

Ile De France was located in a building originally intended to be for a nursery. The restaurant closed in 1998.

== See also ==
- List of Michelin starred restaurants in the Netherlands
