= De Kastanjehof =

Coordinates: 52°10′47.67″N 5°13′19.04″E

- Interactive map of De Kastanjehof

Restaurant information
- Established: before March 1967
- Head chef: Bruno Vittali
- Food type: French
- Location: Kloosterlaan 1, Lage Vuursche, 3749 AJ, Netherlands
- Seating capacity: 100
- Website: Official website

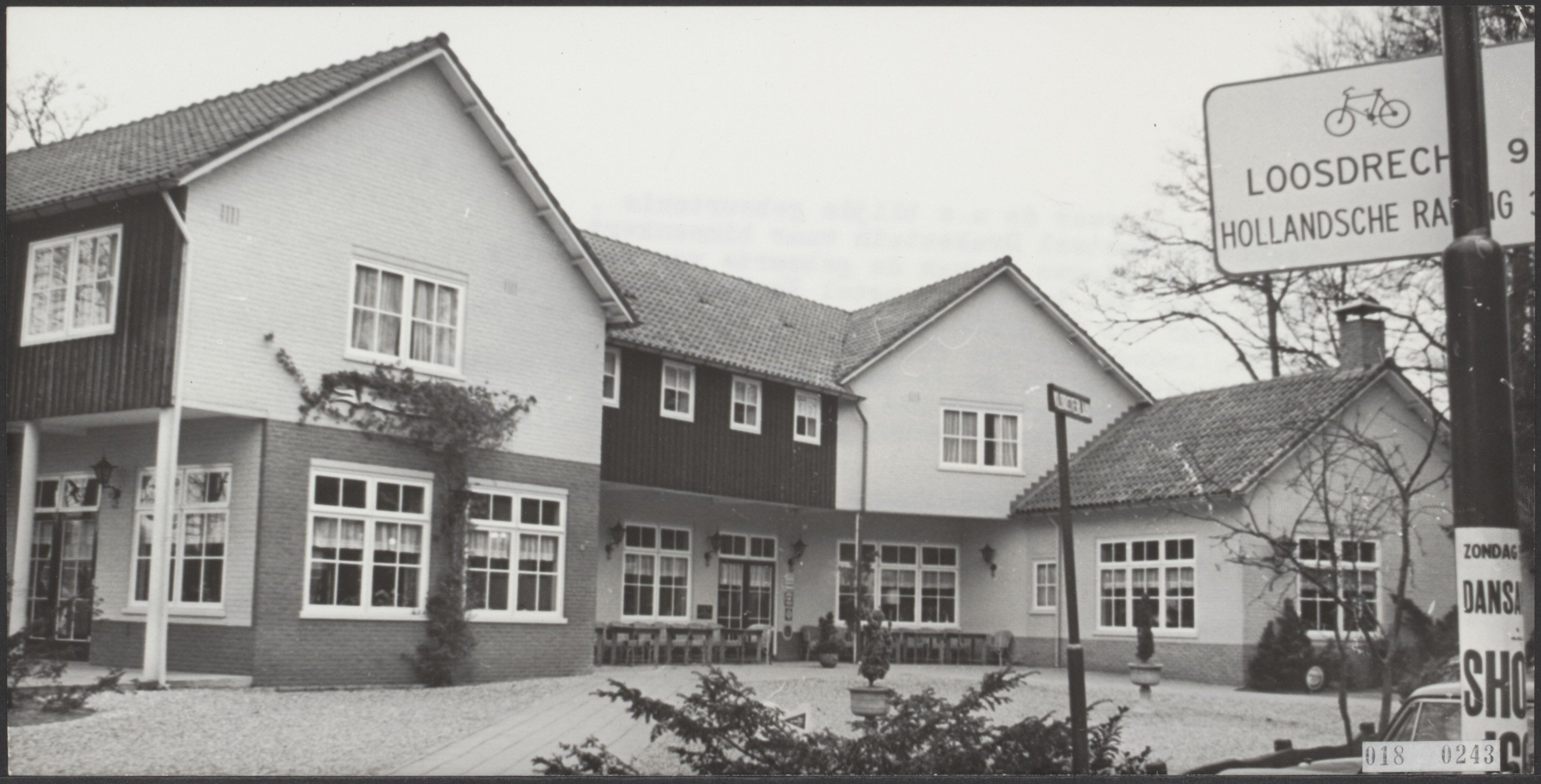

Restaurant De Kastanjehof is a hotel-restaurant in Lage Vuursche, in the Netherlands. It was a fine dining restaurant that was awarded one Michelin star in both 1990 and 1991.

In the period 2000-2002 the restaurant was awarded a Bib Gourmand.

At the time of the Michelin stars, head chef was Wulf Engel. In 1991, he sold the restaurant to his, by then, ex-wife Marianne and left the restaurant. As a consequences, the restaurant lost its Michelin star.

Hotel-restaurant De Kastanjehof is a member of "Relais Restaurants".

Originally, De Kastanjehof was owned by the family Bleuland van Oordt. In 1985, they sold the hotel-restaurant to Wulf and Marianne Engel, who managed to earn a Michelin star. Due to divorce, Wulf sold his part in the company to his wife Marianne, who shortly after that sold the place to Hein van Oosterom. Steady base in the kitchen was chef Jan Schipper, who worked here from 1967 to 2008. After Jan Schipper retired, Bruno Vittali took over.

== See also ==
- List of Michelin starred restaurants in the Netherlands
