= De Boterbloem =

Restaurant in Heerlen, the Netherlands

Coordinates: 50°53′16.71″N 5°58′21.24″E

- Interactive map of De Boterbloem

Restaurant information
- Established: 1994
- Closed: 2004
- Head chef: Léon Winthaegen
- Location: Laanderstraat 27, Heerlen, 6411 VA, Netherlands

Restaurant De Boterbloem is a defunct restaurant in Heerlen, Netherlands. It was a fine dining restaurant that was awarded one Michelin star in 2001 and retained that rating until 2004. Winthaegen closed the restaurant in 2004 and started his new restaurant Het Vervolg on the same location but with another formula. He sold the restaurant shortly after the change.

Owner and head chef of the restaurant was Léon Winthaegen.

De Boterbloem earned a Bib Gourmand in the year 2000.

== See also ==
- List of Michelin starred restaurants in the Netherlands
