= Spandershoeve =

Coordinates: 52°14′20.53″N 5°9′40.63″E

- Interactive map of Spandershoeve

Restaurant information
- Established: 1972
- Head chef: Guido Boerenkamp
- Food type: Indonesian
- Rating: Bib Gourmand
- Location: Bussumergrintweg 46, Hilversum, 1217 BS, Netherlands
- Seating capacity: 65
- Website: Official website

Spandershoeve is a restaurant in Hilversum, Netherlands. It is a fine dining restaurant that was awarded one Michelin star in 1998 and retained that rating until 2020.

On the loss of their star, they did receive a Bib Gourmand which they have retained until 2020.

Spandershoeve was the first restaurant with an Indonesian styled kitchen to receive a Michelin star.

Gault Millau awarded the restaurant 13 out of 20 points.

Head chef of Spandershoeve is Guido Boerenkamp.

Restaurant Spandershoeve was opened in 1972. In 1974, Anita Boerenkamp and her husband took over. For many years, including the Michelin star period, she was the head chef.

== See also ==
- List of Michelin starred restaurants in the Netherlands
