= Le Sapiche =

Coordinates: 50°48′51.26″N 5°53′25.5″E

- Interactive map of Le Sapiche

Restaurant information
- Established: 1993
- Closed: 2005
- Head chef: Sascha Cremers
- Food type: French
- Rating: Michelin Guide
- Location: Rijksweg 12, Gulpen, 6271 AE, Netherlands
- Seating capacity: 45

Le Sapiche is a defunct restaurant in Gulpen, in the Netherlands. It was a fine dining restaurant that was awarded one Michelin star in 2000 and retained that rating until 2005.

The owner and head chef of Le Sapiche was Sascha Cremers.

The restaurant closed in 2005 when Cremers sold the restaurant.

== See also ==
- List of Michelin starred restaurants in the Netherlands
