= De Graaf (restaurant) =

Coordinates: 52°21′12.25″N 4°51′49.07″E

- Interactive map of De Graaf

Restaurant information
- Established: 1987
- Closed: 1991
- Chef: Harry de Graaf
- Food type: French
- Rating: Michelin Guide
- Location: Koninginneweg, Amsterdam, Netherlands

Restaurant De Graaf is a defunct restaurant in Amsterdam, in the Netherlands. It was a fine dining restaurant that was awarded one Michelin star in both 1990 and 1991.

Owner and head chef was Harry de Graaf.

The restaurant was closed down due to a subsiding kitchen. Renovation proved to be too costly, so closure was the only reasonable choice.

== See also ==
- List of Michelin starred restaurants in the Netherlands
