= Twentsche Hoeve =

Restaurant information
- Established: abt. 1966
- Rating: Michelin Guide
- Location: Enter, Overijssel, Netherlands

Twentsche Hoeve is a defunct restaurant located in Enter, Netherlands. It was a fine dining restaurant that was awarded one or two Michelin stars in the period 1974–1988.

Head chef was Barth Brandt. He and his wife Els, ran the restaurant for 25 years but were forced to sell when Brandt was no longer able to manage the restaurant and his multiple sclerosis at the same time.

Restaurant Twentsche Hoeve burned down two times. The first time was in 1969, the second time 1980. Both times the restaurant reopened again. It closed down was and sold in 1991 to Toon Rumpthorst.

== Star history ==
- 1974-1975: two stars
- 1976-1980: one star
- 1981-1982: no stars (due to burning down of the restaurant)
- 1983-1988: one star

== See also ==
- List of Michelin starred restaurants in the Netherlands
