= Rôtisserie Rue du Bois =

Coordinates: 52°37′55.32″N 4°44′49.89″E

- Interactive map of Rôtisserie Rue du Bois

Restaurant information
- Established: 1972
- Closed: 1990
- Previous owner: Nico Blokker
- Head chef: Dick Wijker
- Location: Van den Boschstraat 3, Alkmaar, Netherlands
- Seating capacity: 45

Rôtisserie Rue du Bois is a defunct restaurant in Alkmaar, Netherlands. It was a fine dining restaurant that was awarded one Michelin star in 1979. The restaurant lost its star the next year, after the departure of the head chef. Head chef in the time of the Michelin star was Dick Wijker. Owner and Maître d'hôtel was Nico Blokker. The restaurant had a classic style and food was prepared at the table, like filleting of fish or jointing game.

== See also ==
- List of Michelin starred restaurants in the Netherlands
