= Zarzo =

Zarzo is a Spanish surname. Notable people with the surname include:

- Manuel Zarzo (1932–2025), Spanish film actor
- Vicente Zarzo Pitarch (1938–2021), Spanish horn player
