= Alliance Gastronomique Néerlandaise =

Dutch culinary association

Alliance Gastronomique Néerlandaise (popular: Alliance Gastronomique) is a culinary association of quality restaurants in the Netherlands and Flanders.

The partnership was established in 1967 as a response to the spreading taste flattening, lack of culinary products and inadequate training of chefs and other restaurant staff. By that time the Netherlands were not known for their culinary tradition, so the partnership of the 19 founding restaurateurs was a break with the past.

At that time the "Alliance Gastronomique" stated the promotion of the culinary culture in the Netherlands as its mission.

Alliance Gastronomique is by now the oldest culinary partnership in Europe. The status it has earned, makes that the name alone now serves as quality seal.

== Founding members ==
Members of Alliance Gastronomique Néerlandaise in 1967

1. De Witte, Amersfoort. Head chef: Ernst Hastrich
2. De Boerderij, Amsterdam. Head chef: Herman Wunneberg
3. Dikker & Thijs, Amsterdam. Head chef: H.J. van der Vecht
4. De Echoput, Apeldoorn. Head chef: Jaap Klosse
5. Chalet Royal, 's-Hertogenbosch. Head chef: C.A.M. van Gaalen
6. Carelshaven, Delden. Head chef: J.E. Kluvers
7. De Zwaan, Etten-Leur. Head chef: Ad Peijnenburg
8. Oudt Leyden, Leiden. Head chef: S.M. Borgerding
9. Château Neercanne, Maastricht. Head chef: H.P.J. Stassen
10. De Beukenhof, Oegstgeest. Head chef: not known
11. Het Oude Jachthuis, Pesse. Head chef: A.H. van Doesburg
12. 't Koetshuis, Rhenen. Head chef: Marianne Frisch
13. Old Dutch, Rotterdam. Representative: M.W. Mannes
14. De Witte Holevoet, Scherpenzeel. Head chef: J.C.M. Hehenkamp
15. Prinses Juliana, Valkenburg aan de Geul. Head chef: A. Stevens
16. De Nederlanden, Vreeland. Head chef: O.E.K. Hartung
17. De Kieviet, Wassenaar. Head chef: Luigi Gandini
18. Hostellerie De Hamert, Wellerlooi. Head chef: Jan. H.J. Grothausen
19. Het Poorthuys, Zierikzee. Head chef: W.E.L. te Mey

Cas Spijkers, head chef De Swaen, often mentioned as one of the founders, is not mentioned in contemporary sources as founder.

== Present member restaurants ==
(all restaurants in the Netherlands, unless stated otherwise)

- Bord'Eau (Hotel de L’Europe) - Amsterdam
- Ciel Bleu (Hotel Okura Amsterdam) - Amsterdam (2 Michelin stars)
- Cordial - Oss (1 Michelin star)
- Da Vinci - Maasbracht (2 Michelin stars)
- De Bokkedoorns - Overveen (2 Michelin stars)
- De Fuik - Aalst (former star restaurant)
- De Gieser Wildeman - Noordeloos (1 Michelin star)
- De Heeren van Harinxma (Bilderberg Landgoed Lauswolt) - Beetsterzwaag (‘’former star restaurant’’)
- De Leuf - Ubachsberg (2 Michelin stars)
- De Librije - Zwolle (3 Michelin stars)
- De Pastorie - Lichtaart-Kasterlee, Belgium (1 Michelin star)
- De Treeswijkhoeve - Waalre (2 Michelin stars)
- De Zwaan - Etten-Leur (1 Michelin star)
- Hermitage - Rijsoord (1 Michelin star)
- Het Koetshuis - Bennekom (1 Michelin star)
- Hotel Gastronomique De Echoput - Apeldoorn (1 Michelin star)
- Hostellerie De Hamert - Wellerlooi (‘’former star restaurant’’)
- Kaatje bij de Sluis - Blokzijl (2 Michelin stars)
- La Rive (InterContinental Amstel Amsterdam) - Amsterdam (2 Michelin stars)
- Merlet - Schoorl (1 Michelin star)
- Oud Sluis - Sluis (3 Michelin stars)
- De Vlindertuin - Zuidlaren (1 Michelin star)
- Restaurant Dorset - Borne
- Restaurant Fred - Rotterdam (1 Michelin star)
- 't Nonnetje - Harderwijk (1 Michelin star)
- Niven - Rijswijk (1 Michelin star)
- Restaurant Patrick Devos - Bruges - Belgium
- Restaurant Vinkeles - Amsterdam (1 Michelin star)
- Sonoy - Emmeloord (1 Michelin star)
- Tout à Fait - Maastricht (1 Michelin star)
- Wollerich - Sint Oedenrode (1 Michelin star)
- Yamazato (Hotel Okura Amsterdam) - Amsterdam (1 Michelin star)

== Former member restaurants ==
(Incomplete list, feel free to add)

- Chapeau! - Bloemendaal, closed (1 Michelin star)
- De Hoefslag, Bosch en Duin - 1 Michelin star
- De Karpendonkse Hoeve, Eindhoven - 1 Michelin star
- Kasteel Wittem, Wittem, closed - 1 Michelin star
- La Vilette, Rotterdam, closed - 1 Michelin star
- Nolet Het Reymerswale, Yerseke, closed - 1 Michelin star
- Restaurant Den Gouden Harynck, Bruges
- Ron Blaauw, Amsterdam - 2 Michelin stars
- 't Raethuys, Wateringen, closed - 1 Michelin star
- De Bokkepruik, Heemse - 1 Michelin star
- De Wanne, Ootmarsum - 1 Michelin star
- Chalet Royal - 's-Hertogenbosch (1 Michelin star)
- Lai Sin's - Driebergen (‘’former star restaurant’’)
- Herberg Onder de Linden in Aduard. (1 Michelin star)
