= Cordial =

Cordial may refer to:

== Food and drink ==
- Liqueur, an alcoholic beverage
- Cordial (candy), a type of candy that has a liquid filling inside a chocolate shell
- Cordial (medicine), a medicinal beverage
- Elderflower cordial, a non-alcoholic beverage, commonly called just "cordial" in Ireland
- Squash (drink), a non-alcoholic fruit drink concentrate sometimes known as cordial

== Other uses ==
- Cordial (album), an album by La Bottine Souriante
- Cordial (restaurant), a Michelin-starred restaurant in The Netherlands
- Agreeable, a personality trait also known as "cordiality"
