= 't Nonnetje =

Michelin star winner restaurant in the Netherlands

Coordinates: 52°21′3.54″N 5°37′12.76″E

- Interactive map of 't Nonnetje

Restaurant information
- Head chef: Michel van der Kroft
- Food type: French, Mediterranean, International
- Rating: Michelin Guide
- Location: Vischmarkt 38, Harderwijk, 3841 BG, Netherlands
- Seating capacity: 45
- Website: Official website

't Nonnetje is a restaurant in Harderwijk, Netherlands. It is a fine dining restaurant that was awarded one Michelin star for the periods 2004–2007 and 2009–2014. In 2015 the restaurant was awarded its second Michelin star. GaultMillau awarded the restaurant 16 out of 20 points.

The head chef of 't Nonnetje is Michel van der Kroft, who joined the restaurant in 2006 after he left De Kersentuin. He took over from Omar Dahak who had earned the Michelin star in 2004. With the change of head chef the restaurant lost its star, but regained it in 2008.

't Nonnetje has been a member of Alliance Gastronomique Néerlandaise since 2009.

== See also ==
- List of Michelin starred restaurants in the Netherlands
