= De Fuik (restaurant) =

Coordinates: 51°46′25.09″N 5°8′14.45″E

- Interactive map of De Fuik

Restaurant information
- Established: 1980
- Head chef: Marco Poldervaart
- Food type: French
- Location: Maasdijk 1, Aalst, 5308 JA, Netherlands
- Seating capacity: 60
- Website: Official website

De Fuik is a restaurant in Aalst in the Netherlands. It is a fine dining restaurant that was awarded one Michelin star in 2008 and retained that rating until 2011.

GaultMillau did not award the restaurant any points, but retained it in its Guide. The restaurant has lost its rating due to the new owner/head chef coming in.

Owner and head chef of De Fuik is Marco Poldervaart. Head chefs in the period of the Michelin star were Ton Verhaar (2008–2009) and Ralph Drost (2009–2011).

The restaurant is located in a modern building on the banks of the river Oude Maas. Marco and Inez Poldervaart bought the restaurant in June 2011. Sellers were Wim and Odilia Brundel, who had owned the restaurant for 31 years.

De Fuik is a member of Alliance Gastronomique Néerlandaise since 1994.

== See also ==
- List of Michelin starred restaurants in the Netherlands
