= Dennis Farnon =

Canadian composer (1923–2019)

- Born: August 13, 1923 Toronto, Ontario
- Died: May 21, 2019 (aged 95) Aalst, Buren, The Netherlands
- Occupation: Canadian-born composer, conductor and musical arranger.

Dennis Farnon (13 August 1923 – 21 May 2019) was a Canadian musical arranger, composer and orchestra conductor.

Dennis Farnon was born in 1923 in Toronto, Canada as John Denis Farnon to Robert and Elsie Farnon (née Menzies). He grew up in a musical family, and learned to play the trumpet at age 12. Through his older brother Robert, he enlisted into the Canadian Army Band, also travelling to Europe to entertain the Allied troops during the last years of the war. In his mid-20s, he moved to Chicago where he played in jazz clubs and pursued studies in conducting, arranging, and orchestration, strongly influenced by the works of Maurice Ravel, Claude Debussy, Béla Bartók and Sergey Prokofiev.

Several years later, he accepted an invitation to Hollywood as musical director for singer Johnny Holiday, and he stayed, continuing to compose, conduct and arrange. In 1956, he was tapped by RCA Records to head their West Coast A & R and signed on as producer, arranger and recording artist. During that time, the Dennis Farnon Orchestra recorded numerous albums, including Magoo in Hi-Fi, over 10 episodes of Mr Magoo cartoon shorts, Chet Atkins in Hollywood, Velvet Carpet – The George Shearing's Quintet, The Enchanted Woods, Songs From The Motion Picture Gigi with singers Gogi Grant and Tony Martin (American singer), and Caution! Men Swinging.

In 1957, he was one of the five founding members (along with Paul Weston, Lloyd Dunn, Jesse Kaye, and Sonny Burke) of the National Academy of Recording Arts and Sciences (now known as The Recording Academy) - the organisation which bestows the annual Grammy Awards.

In the early 1960s he moved to London, where he learnt about library music and signed up with a number of publishing companies such as Boosey and Hawkes, KPM (now EMI) and Chappell Music. Over the course of the next 20 years, he went on to compose and publish a large volume of library music licensed for film, television, radio and other media. The styles ranged from jazz, funk, drama and romantic to his personal favourite, comedy music, which more recently has appeared in The Ren and Stimpy Show and SpongeBob SquarePants.

His movie credits include the score for the 1966 Tony Curtis film Arrivederci, Baby!. For television, he composed music for the Bat Out of Hell (TV series); some episodes of the British children’s series Follyfoot (1971); and wrote the notable themes for Jay Ward's satiric Fractured Flickers (1961-3) and the London Weekend Television production Bouquet of Barbed Wire (1976). In 2002 EMI Records Ltd released "Soho Lounge Heat: Hip Jazz, Funk and Soul Grooves for Films & TV 1969-1977", a compilation of library music compiled by Dickie Klenchblaize which contains 20 Farnon-composed tracks recorded between 1969 and 1974.

As with his brothers Brian and Robert, Dennis Farnon specialised in light music and orchestral arrangements of well-known standards, sometimes writing under the pseudonyms of Paul Gerard and John Dennis.

Farnon resided for a short time in Cascais, Portugal, where he worked with various Portuguese composers-singers including Fernando Tordo, Carlos do Carmo and Sérgio Borges. In 1979 he moved again and settled in the Netherlands. He continued writing, producing solo and chamber pieces with the classical guitarist Yves Storms and composing various short piano pieces. In the mid-1990s he was invited to the Hilversum recording studios to work with the celebrated Dutch Metropole Orchestra on a digitally recorded version of the Mother Magoo Suite.

The films Reversal of Fortune (1990), Fever Pitch (2005) and numerous popular television series such as Spiderman, Doctor Who, Sons and Daughters, Prisoner (TV series) and Flying Doctors also carry credits for his work.

He continued to write short piano compositions right up until his death, always favouring lighthearted comical tunes to make people laugh, with titles such as The Camel with the Wooden Leg, Two Doves on a Chimneypot, Grass Valley and Friend, Ms. Penguin and Twinkletoes and Me.

Farnon died in Aalst, Buren in May 2019 at the age of 95.
