= Niven (restaurant) =

Coordinates: 52°2′13.48″N 4°20′44.71″E

- Interactive map of Niven

Restaurant information
- Established: 11 May 2009
- Closed: 1 April 2020
- Head chef: Niven Kunz
- Food type: French
- Rating: Michelin Guide
- Location: Delftweg 58-a, Rijswijk, Holland, zuid Holland, 2289 AL, Netherlands
- Seating capacity: 60
- Website: Official website

Niven was a fine dining restaurant in Rijswijk, Netherlands. It was awarded one Michelin star in the period 2011–2020.

GaultMillau awarded the restaurant 14 out of 20 points in 2012, two points less than in 2011.

Head chef of Niven is Niven Kunz.

The restaurant is a member of Alliance Gastronomique Néerlandaise.

Chef Niven Kunz was formerly part owner of the Michelin starred 't Raethuys in Wateringen. A business conflict with his parents, also part owner of the restaurant, forced him to leave. After a stint at De Librije, where he had trained before, he opened Niven in the building that used to house Michelin starred 't Ganzenest. The official opening was performed by then mayor of Rijswijk mrs. G.W. van der Wel-Markerink on 11 May 2011.

Niven was the first Michelin starred restaurant in the Netherlands to land a deal with discount-website Groupon. Besides being highly successful for chef Kunz, he sold 3500 covers in ten hours, it paved the way for other Michelin starred restaurants to land deals with Groupon.

On the first of April 2020 it was announced that Niven went bankrupt. Although this happened during the Covid19 crisis in 2020, the pandemic and its subsequent lock-down didn't cause Niven to go bankrupt. It was the consequence of underlying financial problems that reached an unsustainable level then.

== See also ==
- List of Michelin starred restaurants in the Netherlands
