= Kasteel Wittem =

Coordinates: 50°48′51″N 5°54′34.98″E

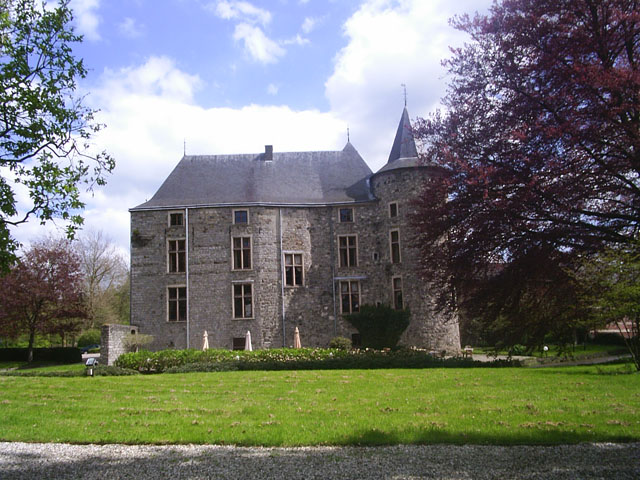
- Interactive map of Kasteel Wittem

Restaurant information
- Established: 1968
- Rating: Michelin Guide
- Location: Wittemer Allee 3, Wittem, 6286 AA, Netherlands
- Website: Official website

Kasteel Wittem is a defunct restaurant located in Castle Wittem in Wittem, in the Netherlands. It was a fine dining restaurant that was awarded one Michelin star in 1977 and retained that rating until 1989.

In the period 1975–1979, head chef was Jan Vossen. At least in the period 1987–1990, Theus van Schaik was the head chef. Wim Rekko took over, but could not retain the star.

The restaurant was part of Hotel Kasteel Wittem, which closed down in June 2009. The owners Marc and Peter Ritzen had run the hotel for 40 years. The hotel reopened, now without a restaurant, in January 2010.

In 2008, Kasteel Wittem and Hostellerie De Hamert celebrated with special arrangements the fact that they were together 100 years in business, the first since 1968, the second since 1948.

Restaurant-hotel Kasteel Wittem was a member of the Alliance Gastronomique Néerlandaise, but left after the sale of the hotel in 2009.

== See also ==
- List of Michelin starred restaurants in the Netherlands
