= Peijnenburg =

Peijnenburg is a surname. Notable people with the surname include:

- Maarten Peijnenburg (born 1997), Dutch footballer
- Rinus Peijnenburg (1928–1979), Dutch politician
- Roland Peijnenburg, owner of De Zwaan (restaurant)
