= Old Dutch (restaurant) =

Restaurant in the Netherlands

Coordinates: 51.91582°N 4.47119°E

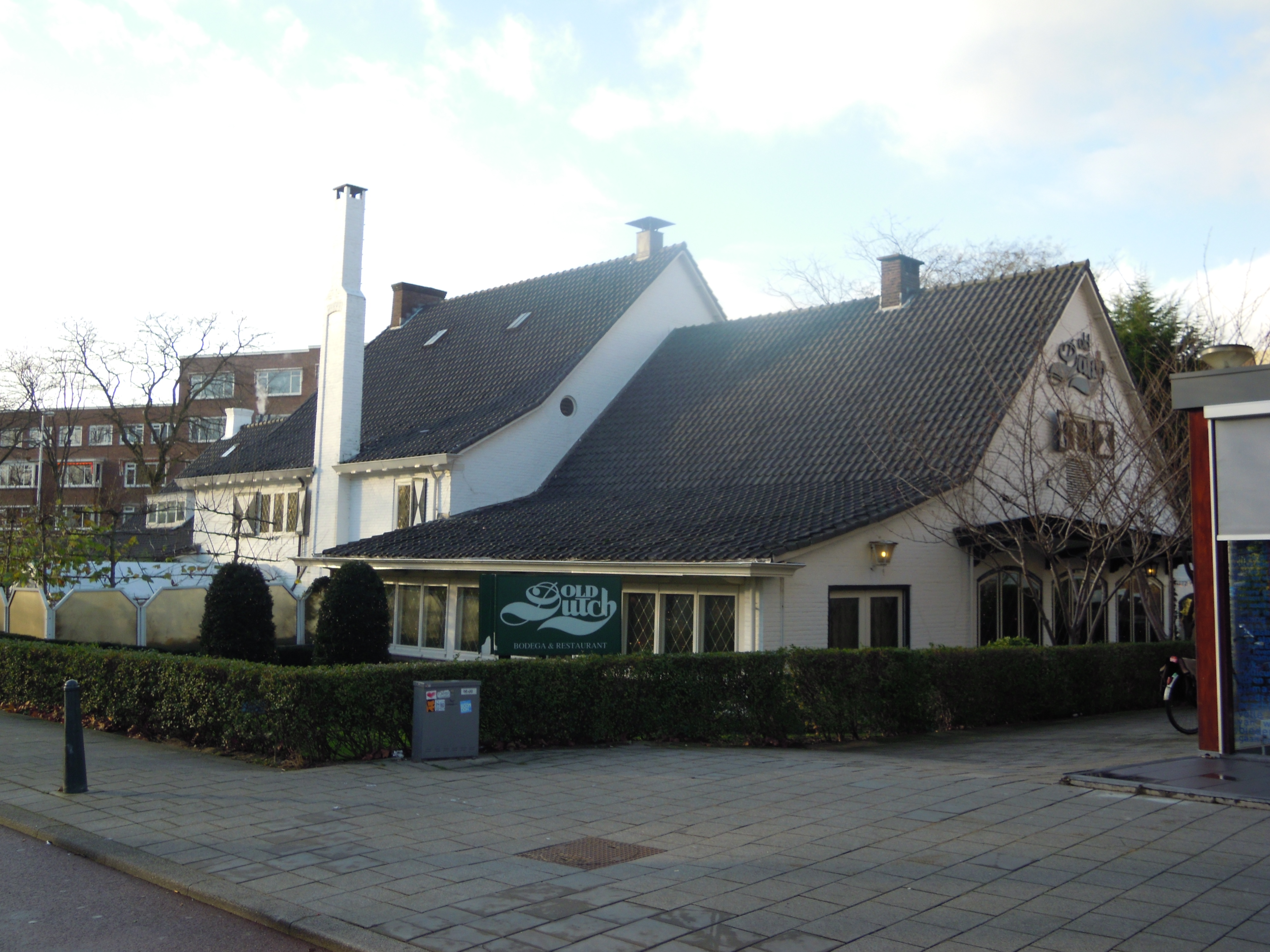
- Interactive map of Old Dutch

Restaurant information
- Established: 1932
- Owner: Aad van der Stel
- Head chef: Louis Snijder
- Food type: French
- Rating: Michelin Guide (1957-1974)
- Location: Rochussenstraat 20, Rotterdam, Netherlands
- Seating capacity: 60

Old Dutch is a bodega and restaurant in Rotterdam, the Netherlands.

== History ==
The establishment was founded in 1932 as Bodega Old Dutch on the Coolsingel 103 and was owned by Toon and Wim Mannes. It was favoured by wealthy Rotterdammers.

On 14 May 1940 Old Dutch was burnt down during the Rotterdam Blitz. On 29 December of the same year the Mannes brothers opened a new bodega and restaurant at the Rochussenstraat 20.

In 1967 Old Dutch was one of the founding members of the Alliance Gastronomique Néerlandaise, represented by M.W. Mannes.

The Mannes family remained owners of the restaurant until 1975.

== Building ==
The building was designed by the architect J. Lelieveldt and is shaped like a farmhouse.

It is the last remaining building of the temporary shopping centre which was built in the neighbourhood after World War II to replace shops which were destroyed during the 1940 bombardment and initially was meant to be a temporary building but was later kept as a permanent housing for the restaurant. The bodega seats 200 people and the restaurant 60.

The entourage and interior has more or less stayed the same since the restaurant was founded. The building is a protected municipal monument because of its cultural heritage value.

== Clientele ==
In the 1960s Old Dutch was noted for being a place where ship-owners, rich demolishers, builders, captains of industry and high seas captains dined. The regular customers were mainly businessmen and wealthy ladies and gentlemen of middle age.

== Awards ==
From 1957 till 1974 Old Dutch held a Michelin star. Famed dishes from those times were ‘Escurion’, ‘Mixed grill de poissons’ and ‘Huitres imperiales de Zélande’ (large oysters from Zeeland). The restaurant also won a joint third prize of the Salon Culinaire at the Horecaf exhibition in Amsterdam in 1950.
