= 't Koetshuis =

Defunct restaurant in Rhenen, Netherlands

- Interactive map of 't Koetshuis

Restaurant information
- Established: 1945
- Closed: 1988
- Rating: Michelin Guide
- Location: Veenendaalsestraatweg 50, Rhenen, 3921 EC, Netherlands
- Coordinates: 51°59′55″N 5°31′49″E
- Seating capacity: n/a

't Koetshuis was a restaurant located in Rhenen, Netherlands. It was a fine dining restaurant that was awarded one or two Michelin stars in the period 1957–1970.

The restaurant was established in 1945 in the stable of the former hotel "Berg en Bos". The hotel had fallen victim to the Second World War. The Frisch family, of Swiss origin, just started all again and started a rotisserie. This restaurant went very well, until it burned down in 1964. Henri Frisch wanted to start over again, but he died a month after the fire. His children went on with the rebuilding and the restaurant reopened in 1965.

Owners of the restaurant were Henri Frisch (1957–1964) and his daughter Marianne Frisch (1964–1970). Marianne Frisch sold the restaurant in 1988. Henri Frisch was also head chef. In 1967, J. van Heusden was head chef.

't Koetshuis was in 1967 one of the founding members of Alliance Gastronomique Néerlandaise, an association of quality restaurants in the Netherlands and Belgium.

== Star history ==
- 1957–1964: two stars
- 1965–1966: one star
- 1967–1970: two stars

== See also ==
- List of Michelin starred restaurants in the Netherlands
