= De Gieser Wildeman =

Coordinates: 51°54′5.81″N 4°56′21.12″E

- Interactive map of De Gieser Wildeman

Restaurant information
- Established: before 2001
- Head chef: René Tichelaar
- Food type: French, Mediterranean
- Rating: Michelin Guide
- Location: Botersloot 1, Noordeloos, 4225 PR, Netherlands
- Seating capacity: 70
- Website: Official website

De Gieser Wildeman is a restaurant in Noordeloos, Netherlands. It is a fine dining restaurant that was awarded one Michelin star for the period 2006–present. The choice of name was inspired by two things: the River Giessen, flowing past the restaurant, and the Gieser Wildeman, a type of culinary pear and one of the favourite dishes of the head chef.

GaultMillau awarded the restaurant 15 out of 20 points.

Head chef of De Gieser Wildeman is René Tichelaar.

The restaurant is a member of Alliance Gastronomique Néerlandaise since 2010.

== See also ==
- List of Michelin starred restaurants in the Netherlands
