= Hermitage (restaurant) =

Coordinates: 51°50′54.45″N 4°35′50.39″E

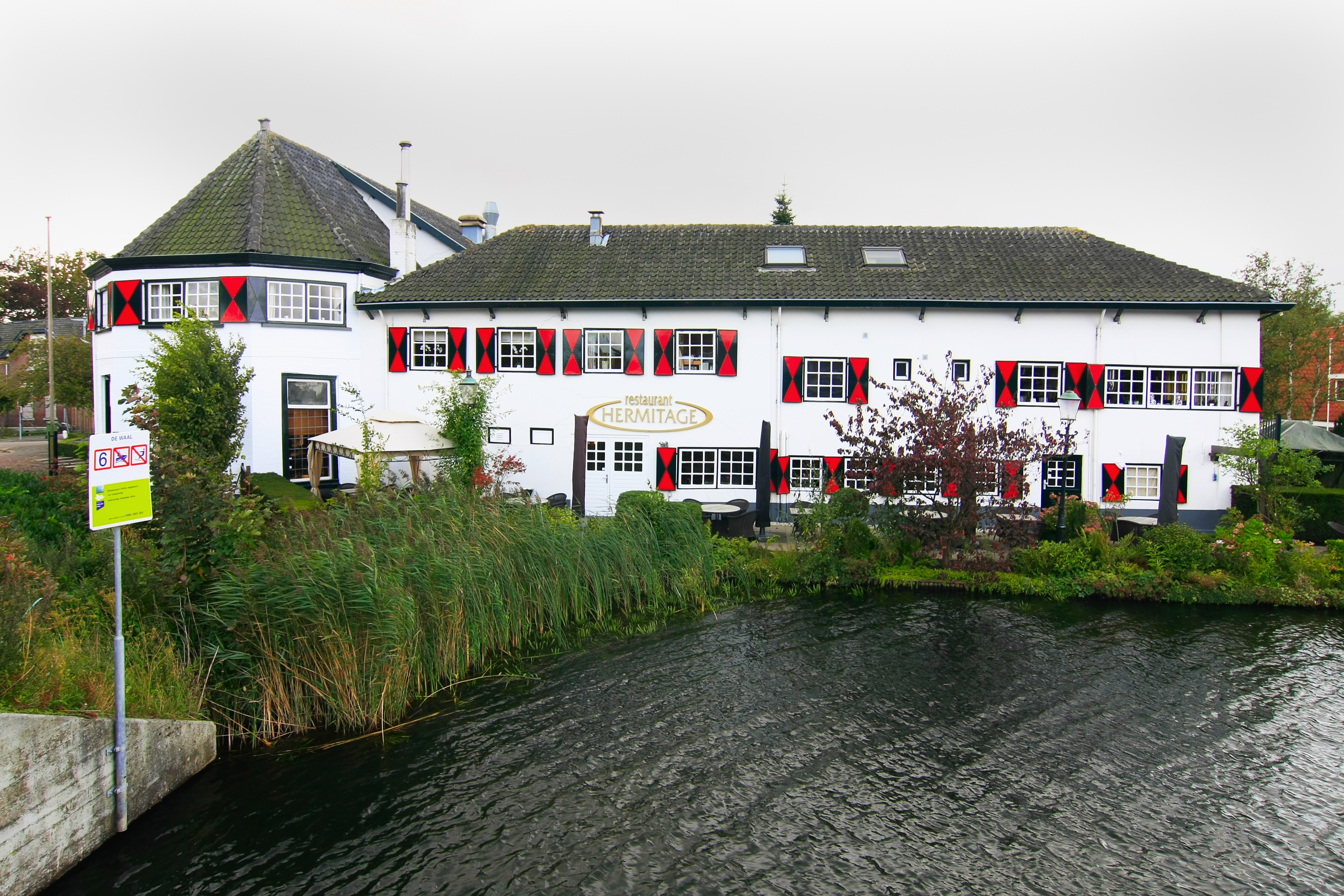
- Interactive map of Hermitage

Restaurant information
- Established: 1994
- Closed: 2014
- Head chef: Jan Klein
- Food type: French
- Rating: Michelin Guide
- Location: Rijksstraatweg 67, Rijsoord, 2988 BB, Netherlands
- Seating capacity: 60
- Website: Official website

Hermitage is a defunct restaurant in Rijsoord, Netherlands. It was a fine dining restaurant that was awarded one Michelin star in 1995 and retained that rating until 2014.

In 2013, Gault Millau awarded the restaurant 15 out of 20 points. Hermitage was a member of Alliance Gastronomique Néerlandaise.

Head chef of Hermitage was Jan Klein. Jan Klein started the restaurant in Zwijndrecht and relocated to Rijsoord in 1999. This building is a monument named "Wapen van Rijsoord", built as a farm around 1800.

The restaurant closed down on 10 June 2014 when chef Klein filed for bankruptcy. He cites as main causes for the bankruptcy his expensive monumental building and price campaign weeks that favoured price above quality.

On 31 October 2014 a new restaurant, Ross Lovell, opened in the Wapen van Rijsoord building.

== See also ==
- List of Michelin starred restaurants in the Netherlands
