= La Vilette =

Restaurant in Rotterdam, The Netherlands

Coordinates: 51°54′59.38″N 4°28′36.12″E

- Interactive map of La Vilette

Restaurant information
- Head chef: Collin van Sabben
- Food type: French
- Location: Westblaak 160, Rotterdam, 3012 KM, Netherlands
- Seating capacity: 60
- Website: Official website

La Vilette was a restaurant located in Rotterdam, Netherlands. It was a fine dining restaurant that was awarded one Michelin star in 1985 and the periods 1987-1989 and 2003–2008.

The guide Gault Millau awarded the restaurant 13 out of 20 points.

In 1993 and 2001, it was mentioned as brasserie, but later reverted to a fine dining restaurant.

Fred Mustert was head chef from 1995 to 2007. Nicolas Belot, sous-chef under Mustert, took over that year. He retained the star for 2008, but then left unexpectedly. Then Marc Muzerie took over, but he couldn't retain the star.

La Vilette was a member of the Alliance Gastronomique Néerlandaise from 2007 to 2009.

== History ==
In 1995, Ingrid Horster and her then partner Fred Mustert took over the restaurant from Carl Schuurs en Yvonne Savert, who went to France. Horster and Mustert broke up their relationship in 2007 and Mustert left La Vilette. In 2009, the restaurant filed for bankruptcy. As reasons were given personal circumstances for owner Horster, the economic downturn and the loss of the Michelin star. After the bankruptcy, Guy Montoux and Gerhard Braun took over, with Jeroen Bot taking command in the kitchen.

== See also ==
- List of Michelin starred restaurants in the Netherlands
