= Merlet =

Michelin starred restaurant in the Netherlands

Coordinates: 52°41′59.24″N 4°41′39.88″E

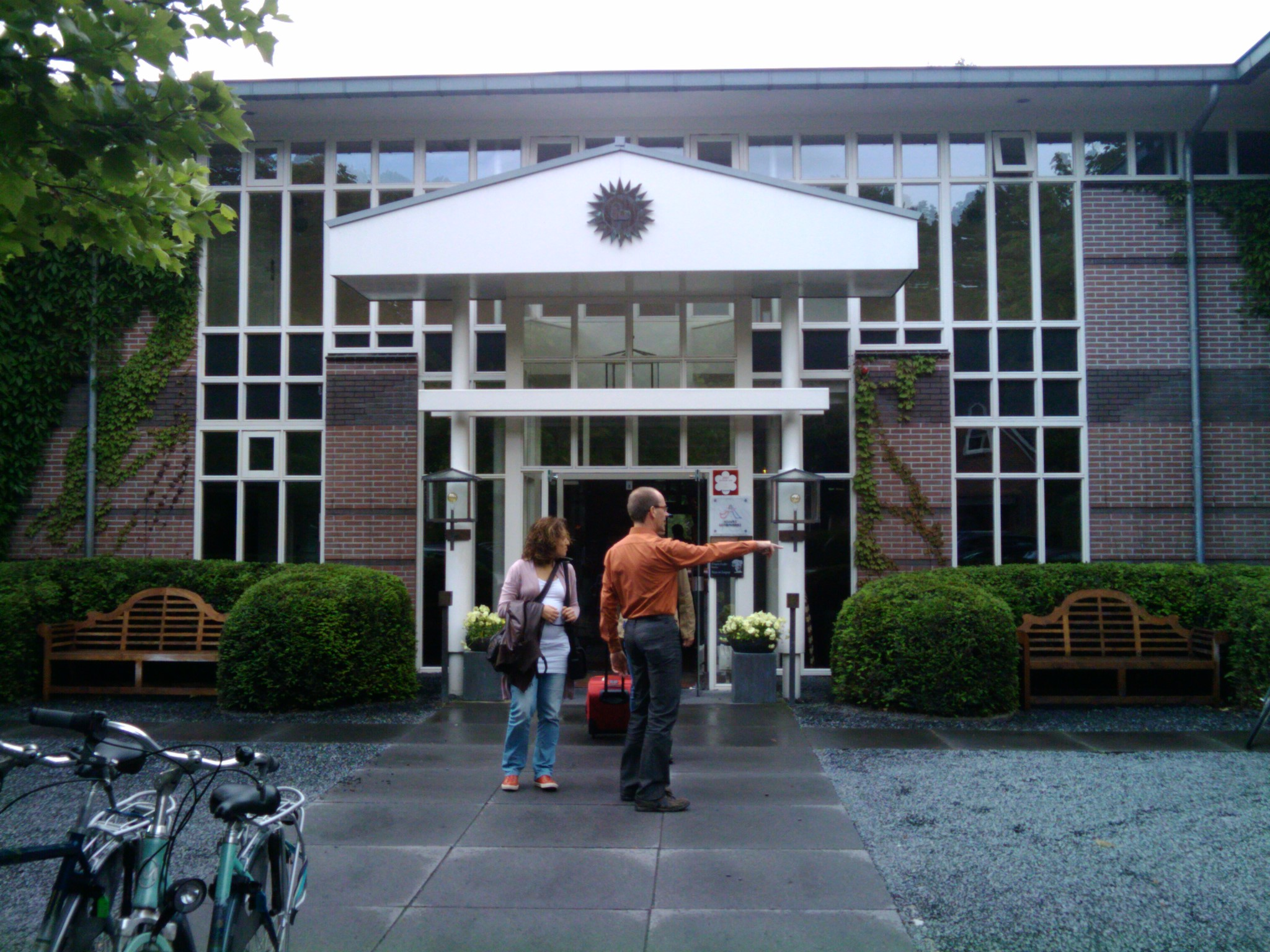
- Interactive map of Merlet

Restaurant information
- Established: 1984
- Head chef: Jonathan Zandbergen
- Food type: Modern
- Rating: Michelin Guide, since 1998
- Location: Duinweg 15, Schoorl, 1871 AC, Netherlands
- Seating capacity: 100
- Website: Official website

Merlet is a hotel and restaurant in Schoorl, Netherlands. It was awarded a Michelin star in 1998, which it has maintained (as of 2023).

GaultMillau awarded them 17.5points out of 20. It was named Dutch restaurant of the year 2012 by restaurant guide Grootspraak.

Merlet is a member of Alliance Gastronomique Néerlandaise.

Head chef Alan Pearson was the first Merlet chef to be awarded a Michelin star, which was still in place in 2023 following several changes of chef. In 2001 Pearson was succeeded by Wilco Berends, who in turn was succeeded by Timo Munts in 2007. Munts left in 2013 and was succeeded by former sous-chef Frank van Enter, and by Jonathan Zandbergen in 2015.
