= Tout à Fait =

Coordinates: 50°50′47.07″N 5°41′38.95″E

- Interactive map of Tout à Fait

Restaurant information
- Established: 1999
- Head chef: Bart Ausems
- Food type: French
- Rating: Michelin Guide
- Location: Sint Bernardusstraat 16-18, Maastricht, 6211 HL, Netherlands
- Seating capacity: 60
- Website: Official website

Restaurant Rotisserie Tout à Fait is a restaurant in Maastricht, Netherlands. It is a fine dining restaurant that was awarded one Michelin star in 2002 and retained that rating until present.

In 2013, GaultMillau awarded the restaurant 16 out of 20 points.

Owner and head chef of Tout à Fait is Bart Ausems.

Tout à Fait is a member of Alliance Gastronomique Néerlandaise since 2008.

In 2012, owner Bart Ausems opened Bistro Boeuf la Roche, a bistro located next door (Sint Bernardusstraat 20). This bistro centres on the free-range beef of the Boeuf la Roche, a type of cattle mainly raised in the Ardennes. The food for this bistro comes out of the kitchen of Tout à Fait.

== See also ==
- List of Michelin starred restaurants in the Netherlands
