= De Witte Holevoet =

Hotel-restaurant

Coordinates: 52°04′43.1″N 5°28′54.5″E

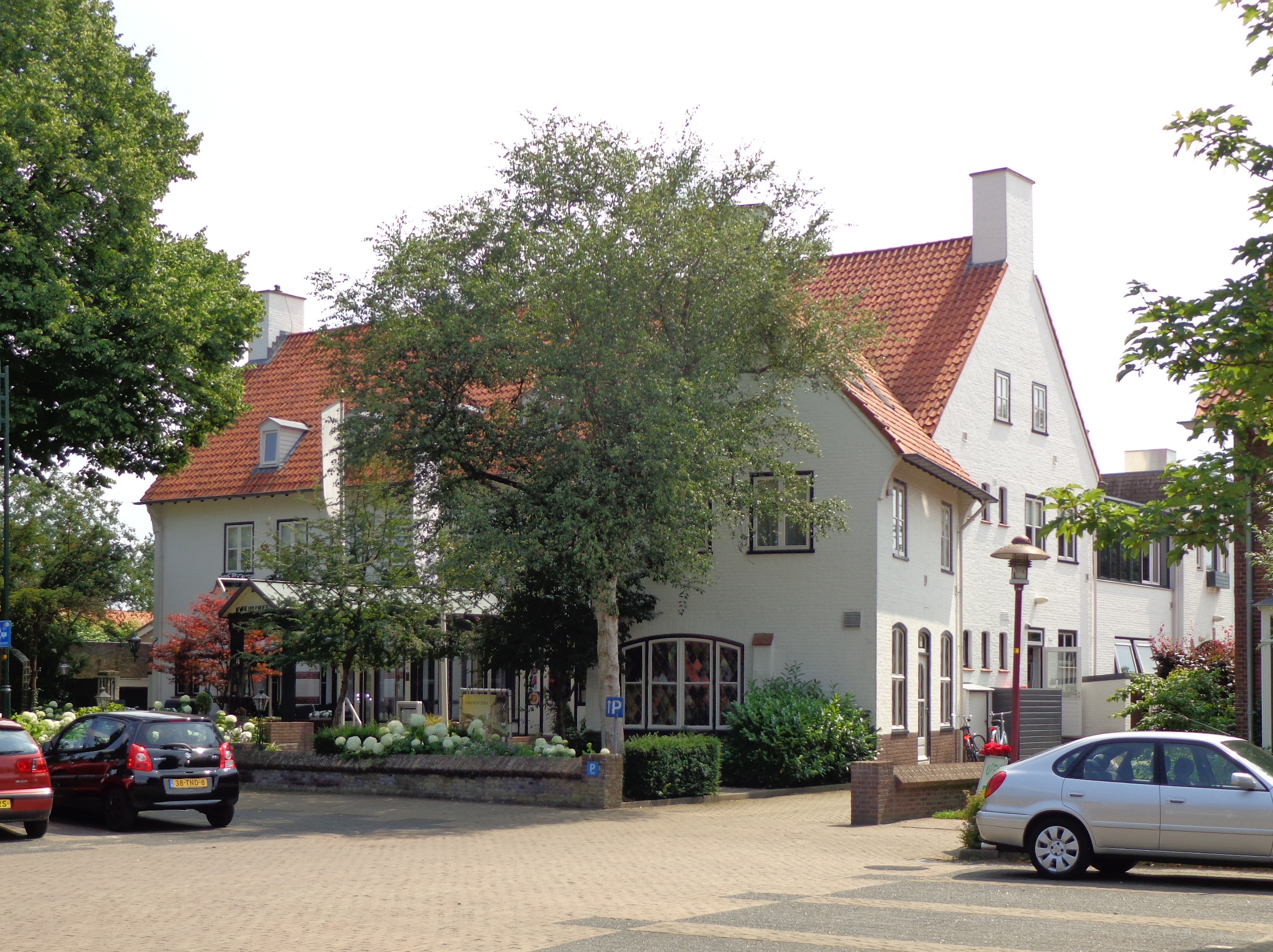
- Interactive map of De Witte Holevoet

Restaurant information
- Owner: John en Annelies Vermeulen
- Head chef: Joop Ruyters
- Food type: French & International
- Location: Holevoetplein 282, Scherpenzeel, 3925 CA, Netherlands
- Website: Official website

De Witte Holevoet was a hotel-restaurant in Scherpenzeel, Netherlands. It was a fine dining restaurant that was awarded one Michelin star in 1962 and retained that rating until 1979.

De Witte Holevoet was one of the founders of Alliance Gastronomique Néerlandaise

In 1974, head chef was Frans Veenings.

It closed in 2017.

== History ==
In 1880, the inn "Herberg Den Holenvoet" was built. In 1940, due to the Battle of the Netherlands, most of the buildings in Scherpenzeel were destroyed. Rebuilding started soon after the end of hostilities and in 1941 the official "first stone" was laid for a new De Witte Holevoet.

== See also ==
- List of Michelin starred restaurants in the Netherlands
