= Wollerich =

Coordinates: 51°33′43.63″N 5°27′35.07″E

- Interactive map of Wollerich

Restaurant information
- Head chef: Gerard Wollerich
- Food type: French
- Rating: Michelin Guide
- Location: Heuvel 23, Sint-Oedenrode, 5492 AC, Netherlands
- Seating capacity: 60
- Website: Official website

Wollerich was a restaurant located in Sint-Oedenrode, in the Netherlands. It is a fine dining restaurant that was awarded one Michelin star in the period 1997–2007 and 2010–present.

Gault Millau awarded the restaurant 17 out of 20 points.

Head chef of Wollerich is Gerard Wollerich.

In 2008, there was great consternation when the restaurant unexpectedly lost its Michelin star. This despite the high score in the Gault Millau. In 2010, the restaurant won its star back.

Wollerich is a member of Alliance Gastronomique Néerlandaise.

== See also ==
- List of Michelin-starred restaurants in the Netherlands
