= Oudt Leyden =

Coordinates: 52°9′43.88″N 4°29′4.42″E

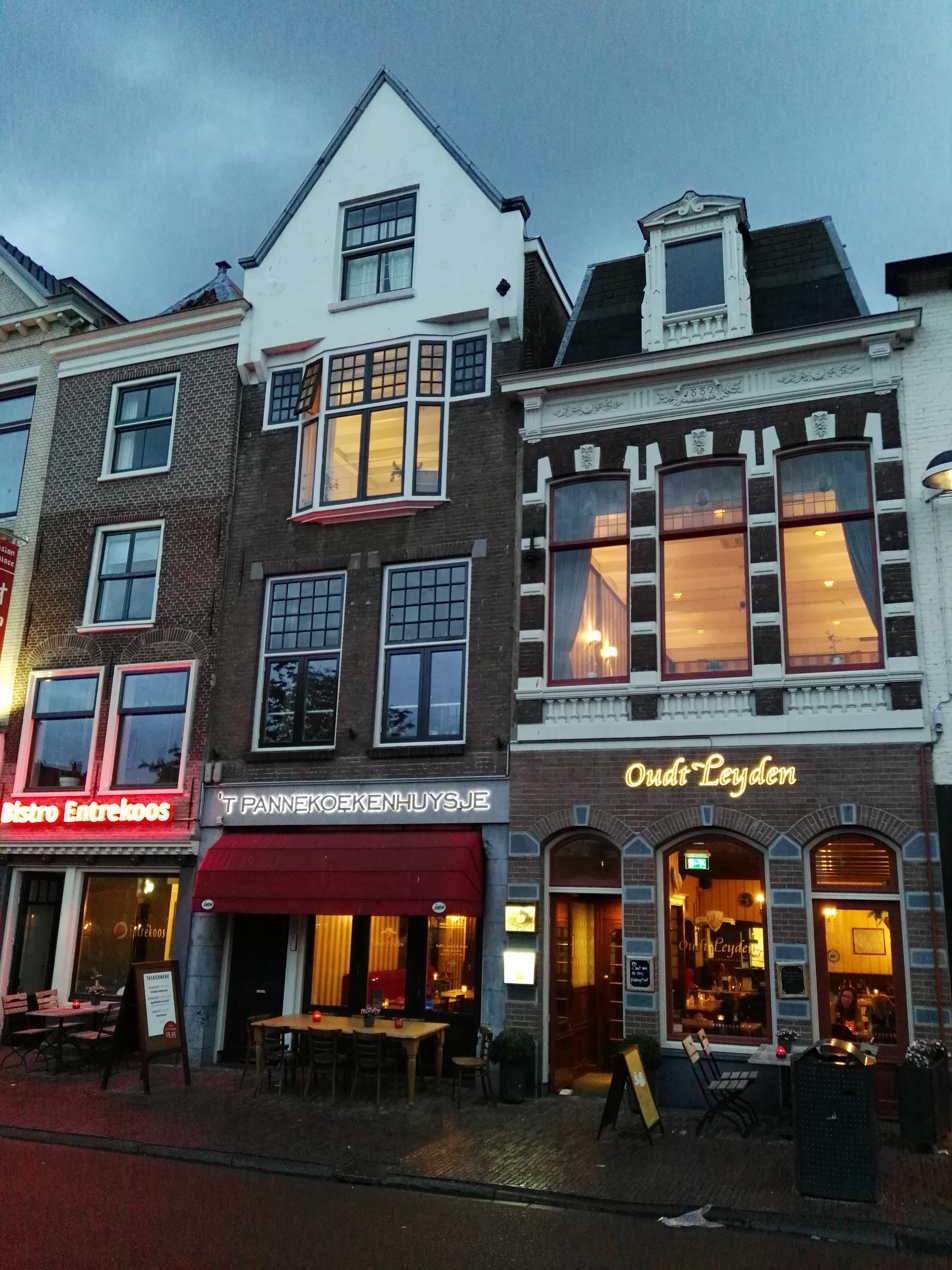
- Oudt Leyden in 2019
- Interactive map of Oudt Leyden

Restaurant information
- Established: 1907
- Food type: pancakes
- Location: Steenstraat 49, Leiden, Netherlands
- Website: oudtleyden.nl

Oudt Leyden is a restaurant in Leiden in the Netherlands. It is a fine dining restaurant turned pancake-restaurant, that was awarded one Michelin star in 1957 and retained that rating from 1957 to 1979. It was again awarded a Michelin star in 1985 and retained that rating until 1989.

Oudt Leyden is one of the founders of Alliance Gastronomique Neerlandaise. In 1967, owner was S.M. Borgerding.

== See also ==
- List of Michelin starred restaurants in the Netherlands
