= Kaatje bij de Sluis =

Restaurant in the Netherlands

Coordinates: 52°43′35.35″N 5°57′39.98″E

- Interactive map of Kaatje bij de Sluis

Restaurant information
- Head chef: Peter Postma
- Food type: French, Regional, Biologic
- Rating: Michelin Guide
- Location: Brouwerstraat 20, Blokzijl, 8356 DV, Netherlands
- Seating capacity: 65
- Website: website

Kaatje bij de Sluis is a restaurant located in Blokzijl, Netherlands. It is a fine dining restaurant awarded one or two Michelin stars from 1978 until the present time, with the exception of 2005. GaultMillau awarded them 16.0 points (out of 20).

The predecessor of head chef Peter Postma was André Mol, who was responsible for the two Michelin star rating.

Kaatje bij de Sluis is a member of Alliance Gastronomique Néerlandaise.

The restaurant is located in the centre of Blokzijl, a small but old town, near the sluices. The name points to the legend of "Kaatje", a girl who at a young age assumed leadership over the kitchen of the inn "In den Gouden Walvisch".

== Star history ==
- 1978-1991: one star
- 1992-2002: two stars
- 2003-2004: one star
- 2005: no stars (due to change of chef)
- 2006–present: one star

== Head chefs ==
- Edzart Delstra: 1979-1986
- André Mol ...-2007
- Peter Postma: 2007–present

== See also ==
- List of Michelin starred restaurants in the Netherlands
