= De Echoput =

Coordinates: 52°13′59.56″N 5°52′40.15″E

- Interactive map of De Echoput

Restaurant information
- Owner: Peter Klosse
- Head chef: Peter Paul van den Breemen (executive chef), Bjorn Massop (head chef)
- Food type: French, Regional, organic
- Rating: Michelin guide
- Location: Amersfoortseweg 86, Hoog Soeren, Apeldoorn, 7346 AA, Netherlands
- Seating capacity: 70
- Website: Official website (restaurant)

De Echoput is a restaurant and part of Hotel Gastronomique De Echoput in Hoog Soeren, Apeldoorn in the Netherlands. It is a fine dining restaurant that was awarded one or two Michelin stars in the period 1971–1997, 2002-2004 and in 2012. GaultMillau awarded the restaurant 15.0 out of 20 points.

De Echoput is a member and one of the founding fathers of Alliance Gastronomique Néerlandaise

The restaurant's first owner and head chef was Jaap Klosse, who made full use of the location on the edge of the Royal Game Reserve Het Loo. Considered a "delightful restaurant" and one of the "best restaurants" in the Netherlands, it was named after an "echoing well" where people traveling by obtained water for their horses. The building has the appearance of a hunting lodge and the restaurant specializes in seasonal game dishes, such as venison, boar and fowl. Theus de Kok has led the kitchen since 1974, first as head chef, later as executive chef-maitre. In June 2010, Leendert Scholtus took over the kitchen from Chiel Dohmen. In February 2014, Scholtus announced that he would leave De Echoput to start his own restaurant. His successor will be Peter Paul van den Breemen, former owner and head chef of Het Jachthuis Hoog Soeren, who starts at 1 April.

The original restaurant was closed and demolished in 2004. Peter Klosse, son of the founder and owner of the complex since 1985, replaced it with a hotel and restaurant. They celebrated the reopening by winning the International Restaurant Awards category Best New Restaurant of the Year/Luxury Restaurant.

== Michelin star history ==
- 1971-1984: one star
- 1985-1989: two stars
- 1990-1997: one star
- 1998-2001: no stars
- 2002-2004: one star
- 2005-2011: no stars
- 2012: one star

According to several sources, the restaurant was already awarded a Michelin star from 1967. The Michelin Guide does not give any evidence of this.

== See also ==
- List of Michelin starred restaurants in the Netherlands
