= Lai Sin's =

Coordinates: 52°3′25.64″N 5°17′42.27″E

- Interactive map of Lai Sin's

Restaurant information
- Established: abt. 1985
- Closed: 1 November 2011
- Head chef: Kwong On Wong
- Food type: Chinese
- Rating: Michelin Guide
- Location: Arnhemsebovenweg 46, Driebergen, 3971 MK, Netherlands
- Seating capacity: 50

Lai Sin's is a defunct restaurant in Driebergen-Rijsenburg, in the Netherlands. It was a fine dining restaurant that was awarded one Michelin star in 1996 and retained that rating until 2008. Lai Sin's chef de cuisine was Kwong On Wong.

The restaurant closed 1 November 2011, when owner Lai Sin Zei sold the restaurant. After a renovation, restaurant Villa Zuidoost opened up in 2012.

Lai Sin's was a member of the Alliance Gastronomique Néerlandaise in the period 1994–2011.

== See also ==
- List of Michelin starred restaurants in the Netherlands
