= De Bokkedoorns =

Coordinates: 52°23′53.3″N 4°33′59.12″E

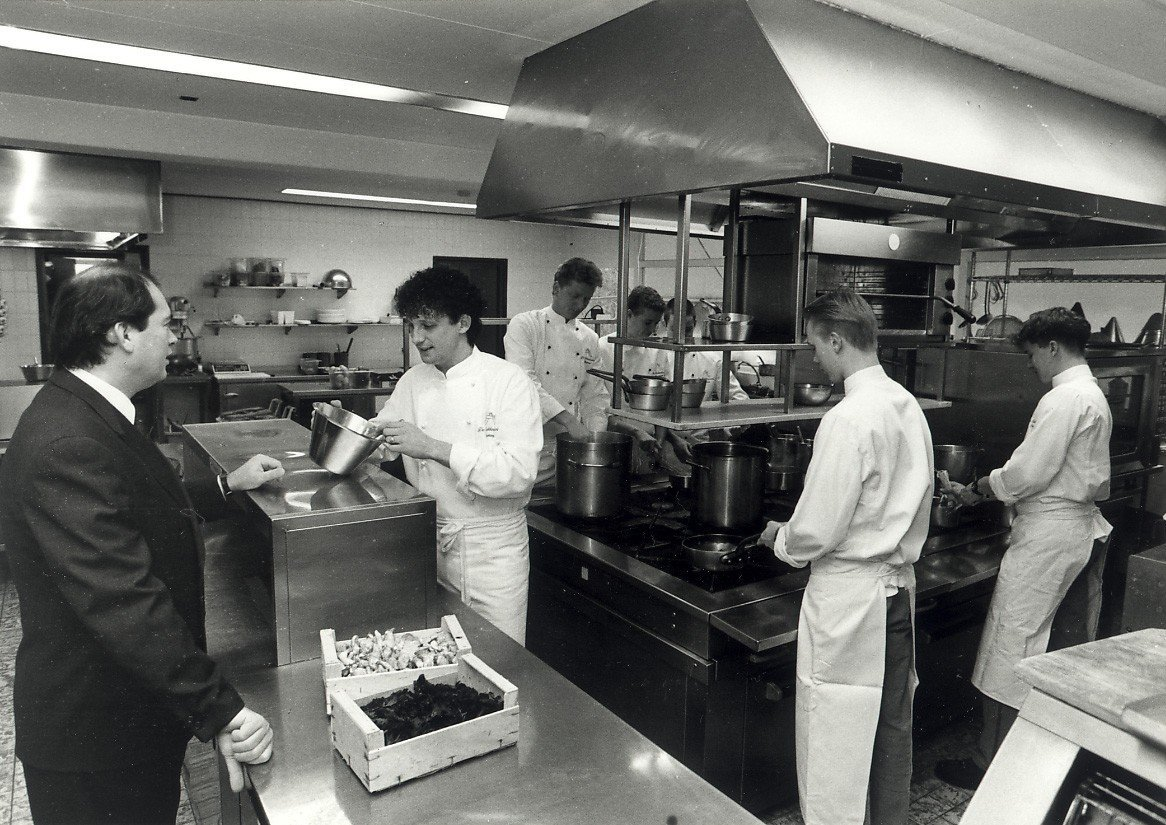
- image of Restaurant De Bokkendoorns
- Interactive map of De Bokkedoorns

Restaurant information
- Established: 1961
- Food type: French
- Rating: Michelin Guide
- Location: Zeeweg 53, Overveen, 2051 EB, Netherlands
- Seating capacity: 75
- Website: website

De Bokkedoorns is a restaurant located in Overveen in the Netherlands. It is a fine dining restaurant that held one Michelin star between 1978 and 1990. Since 1991, it has maintained two Michelin stars.

In 2013, GaultMillau awarded the restaurant 17.0 points (out of 20).

The head chef is Menno Post. He took over the kitchen on 1 January 2013.

In 1991, his predecessor Lucas Rive, head chef since 1990, became the youngest (29 years old) head chef in the Netherlands ever to be awarded two Michelin stars. In 1983, Koos Zijlstra was head chef.

De Bokkedoorns is a member of Alliance Gastronomique Néerlandaise.

== Star history ==
- 1978-1990: one star
- 1991–present: two stars

== See also ==
- List of Michelin starred restaurants in the Netherlands
