= De Hoefslag =

Coordinates: 52°07′27″N 5°14′47″E

- Interactive map of De Hoefslag

Restaurant information
- Established: 1920
- Head chef: Karl Van Baggem
- Food type: French
- Location: Vossenlaan 28, Bosch en Duin, 3735 KN, Netherlands
- Seating capacity: 70
- Website: Official website

De Hoefslag is a restaurant located in Bosch en Duin in the Netherlands. It is a fine dining restaurant that was awarded one Michelin star in the periods 1979-1980, 1987-2005 and 2009-present. It was awarded two Michelin stars in the period 1981-1986.

The Michelin star was lost in 2019, after a new head chef was hired and the restaurant was renovated.

== Overview ==
In 2013, GaultMillau awarded the restaurant 14.0 out of 20 points.

De Hoefslag is a member of Les Patrons Cuisiniers.

Present head chef is Karl van Baggem. Earlier head chefs include Andrès Delpeut (2007), Marc van Gulick (2006-2007), Niels van Halen (2002-2006), André van Doorn (1985-2001, co-head chef, head chef, director-chef), Wulf Engel (1981-1985, co-head chef) and Gerard Fagel (about 1975-1989)

Before the brothers Fagel founded the present restaurant, the building had already a history as public place. Originally named "Huize Bosch en Duin", it was a stopping point for coaches and a garden restaurant. In 1920 the name was changed into "Huize De Hoefslag".

De Hoefslag was once exploited by the brothers Fagel. Martin Fagel took care of the commercial side, while Gerard Fagel took care of the kitchen. Gerard was murdered 9 June 1989, during a burglary in his apartment above the restaurant. After the murder Martin sold the restaurant and left for France.

During renovations in 2007, De Hoefslag renewed the kitchen for around €600,000. This included a new Molteni stove weighing 1500 kilos.

== Michelin stars ==
- 1979-1980: one star
- 1981-1986: two stars
- 1987-2005: one star
- 2006-2008: no stars
- 2009–2019: one star

== See also ==
- List of Michelin starred restaurants in the Netherlands
