= Hoog Soeren =

- Village
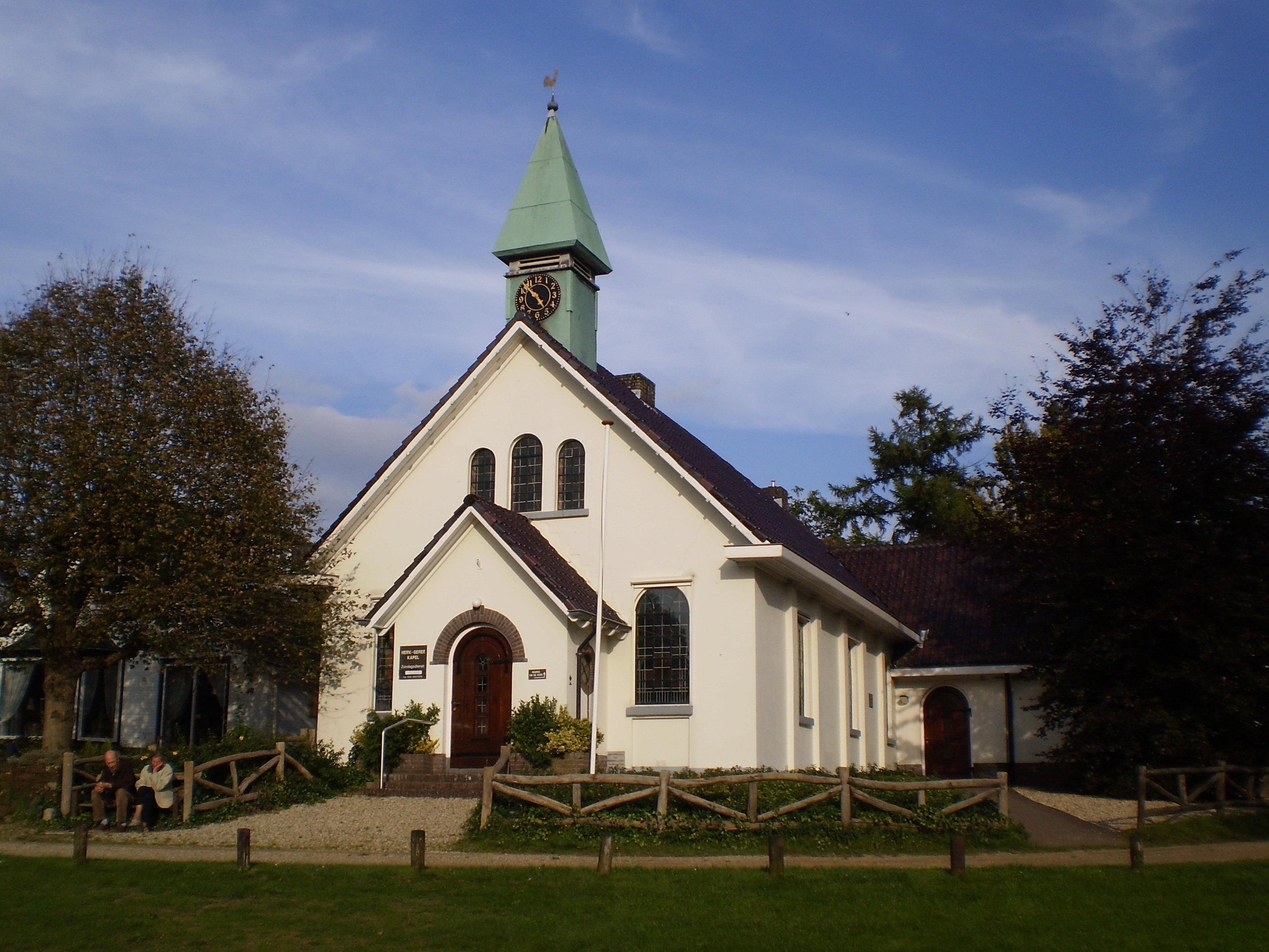
- Chapel of Hoog Soeren

- Location in the province of Gelderland Hoog Soeren (Netherlands)
- Coordinates: 52°13′4″N 5°52′29″E
- Country: Netherlands
- Province: Gelderland
- Municipality: Apeldoorn

Area
  - Total: 23.25 km^{2} (8.98 sq mi)
- Elevation: 92 m (302 ft)

Population (2021)
  - Total: 240
  - Density: 10/km^{2} (27/sq mi)
- Time zone: UTC+1 (CET)
  - Summer (DST): UTC+2 (CEST)
- Postal code: 7346
- Dialing code: 055

Hoog Soeren is a village in the municipality of Apeldoorn, in the province of Gelderland in the Netherlands. Since 1863, it is a crown land.

== History ==
It was first mentioned in 814 or 815 as "portionem de silua in Suornom". The etymology is unclear. Hoog Soeren developed in the early Middle Ages as an esdorp. In 1809, the Echoput, a 70 metres (230 ft) deep water well, was dug. The luxury hotel and restaurant De Echoput is located near the well. In 1840, it was home to 191 people. In 1863, the land was added to the crown land which limited the development of the village. William III of Orange intended to build his palace in Hoog-Soeren, but changed his mind and bought Het Loo Palace, a 1684 palace in Apeldoorn.

The Dutch Reformed Church was built in 1903, and redesigned in 1933. During World War II, the ammunition depot Hoog-Soeren was constructed. In late 1943, it measured 675 hectares (1,670 acres) and was one of the largest depots in north-western Europe. The Allied forces were unaware of its existence, and it was never bombed. On 17 April 1945, the depot was dismantled and partially blown up. From 1998 until 2020, the area was off-limits and the leftover ammunition was defused.

The village is surrounded by the woods of the nature reserve Koninklijke Houtvesterij Het Loo.

== Gallery ==
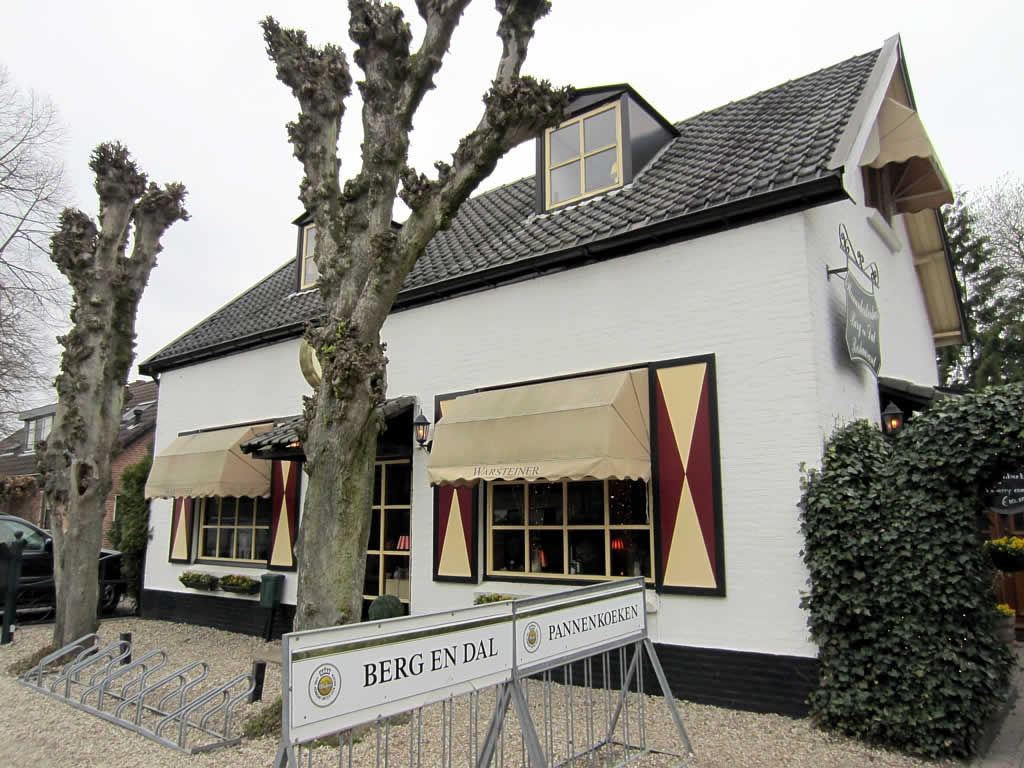
Pancake house

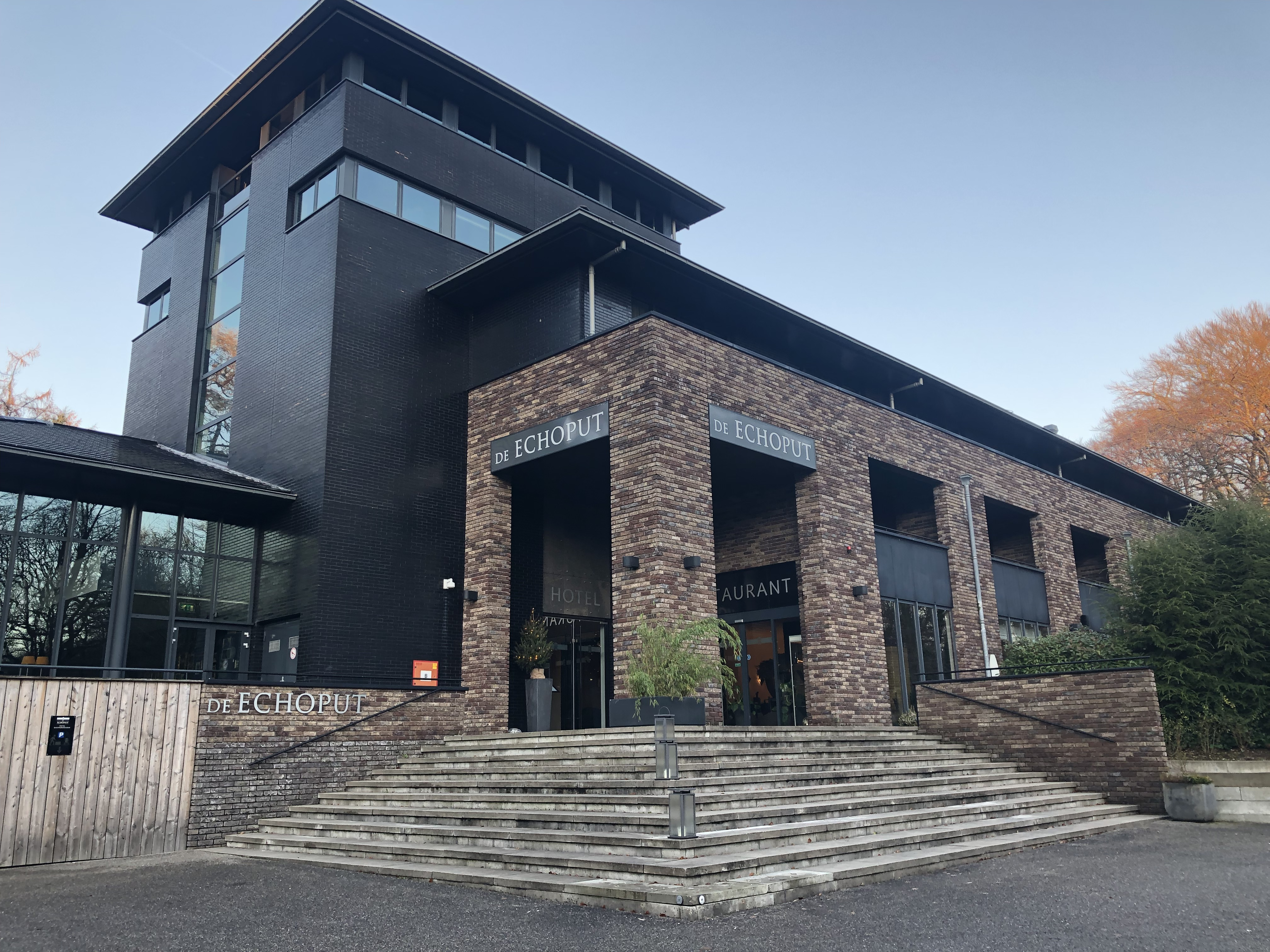
Hotel-restaurant De Echoput

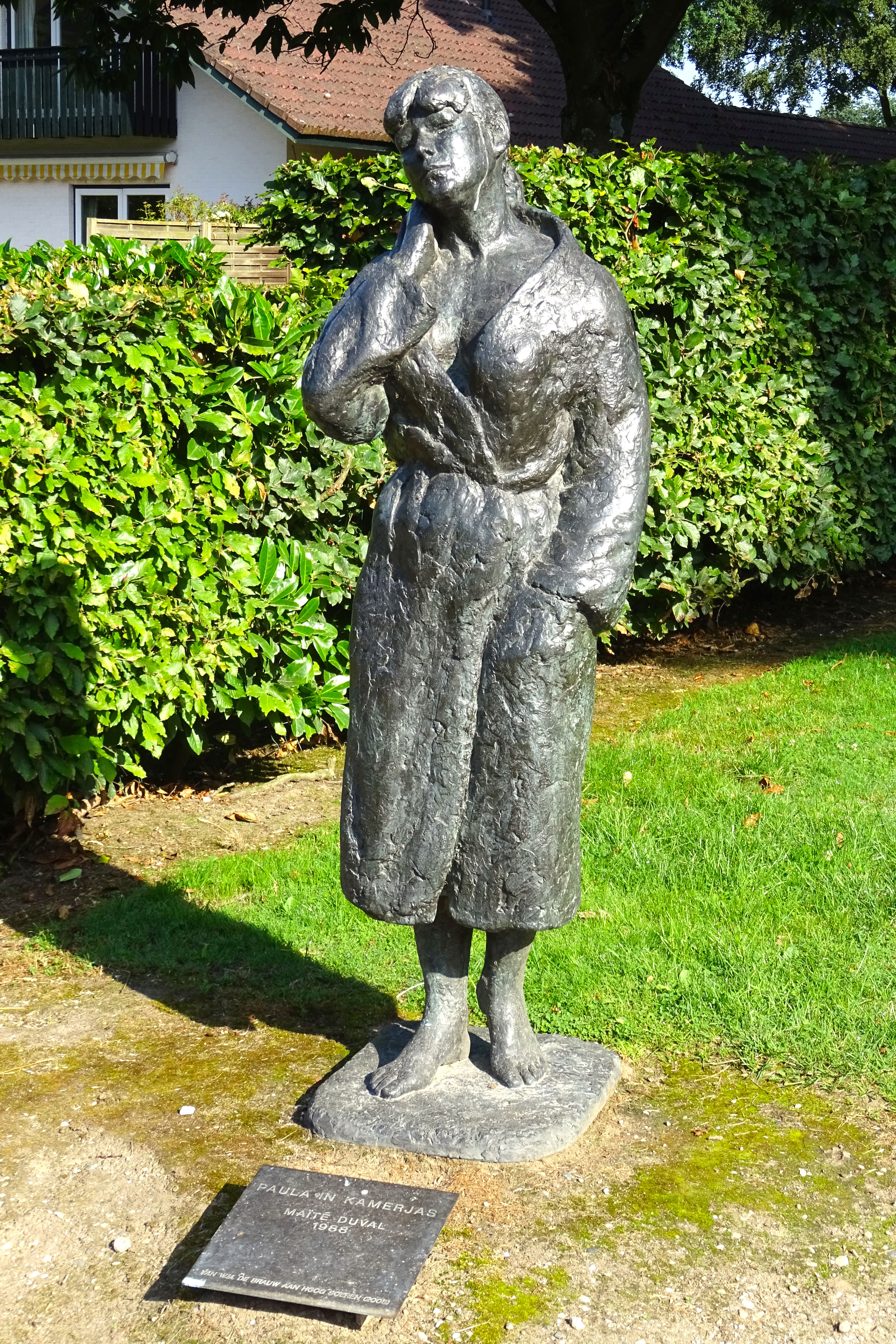
Statue of Paula in her robe by Maïté Duval

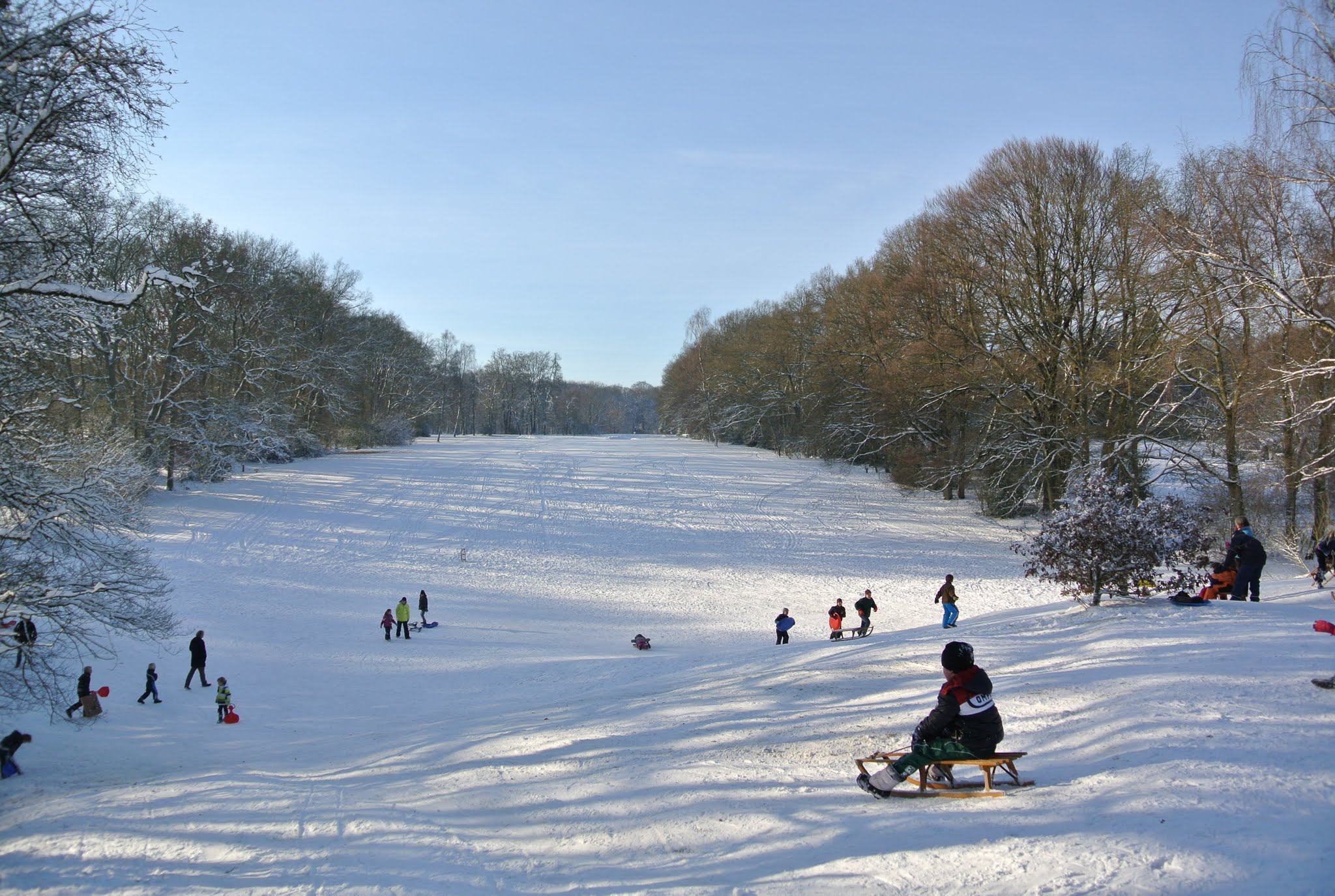
Hoog Soeren in winter
