= Het Koetshuis =

Coordinates: 52°0′30.42″N 5°43′20.76″E

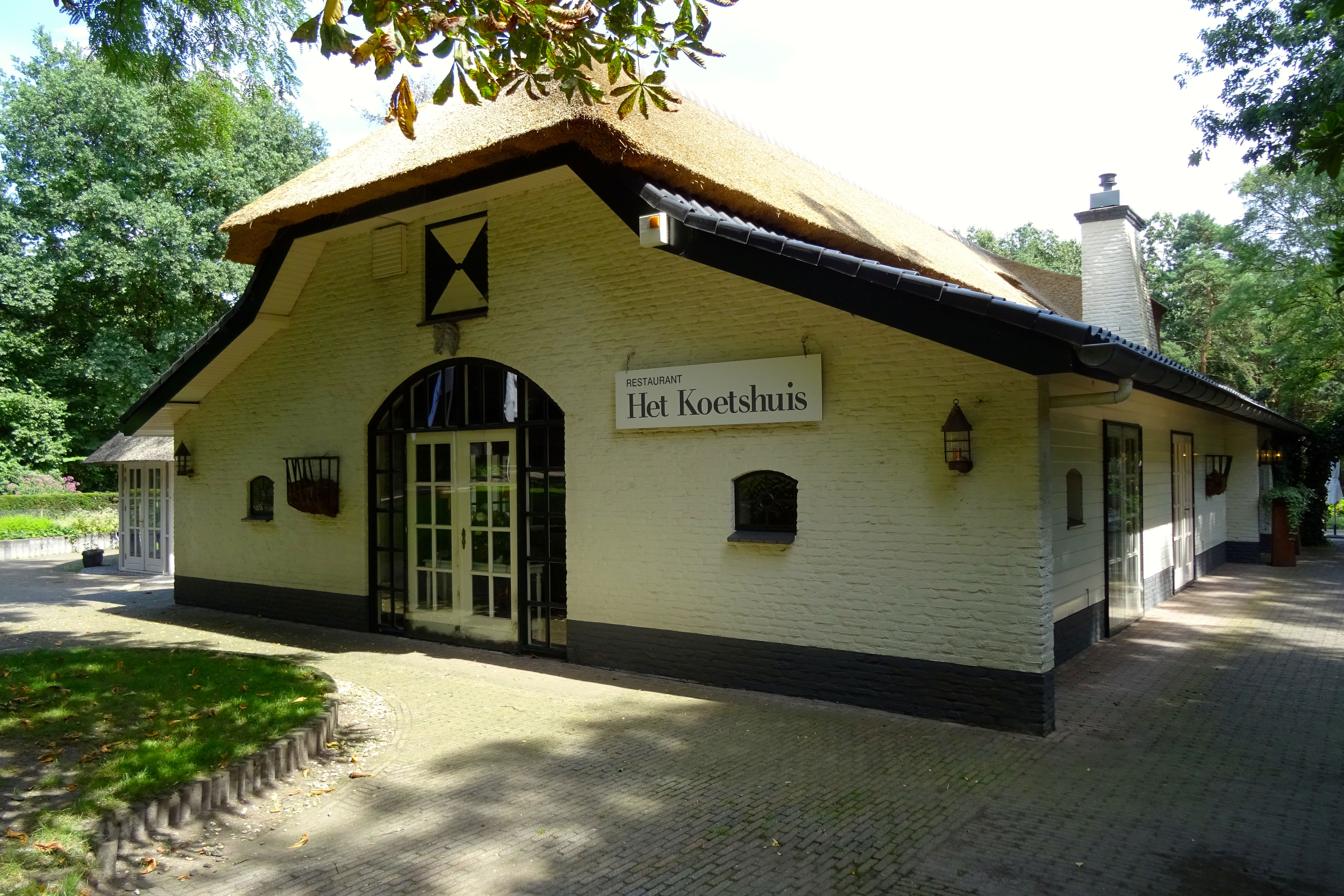
- Het Koetshuis
- Interactive map of Het Koetshuis

Restaurant information
- Established: ca. 1980
- Head chef: Wicher Lohr
- Food type: French
- Rating: Michelin Guide
- Location: Panoramaweg 23a, Bennekom, 6721 MK, Netherlands
- Seating capacity: 60
- Website: www.hetkoetshuis.nl

Restaurant Het Koetshuis is a restaurant located in Bennekom, in the Netherlands. It is a fine dining restaurant that was awarded one Michelin star in the period 1998–present.

Gault Millau awarded the restaurant 16 out of 20 points.

Owner and head chef of Het Koetshuis is Wicher Löhr. In 1986 Wicher and his wife Saskia took over the restaurant.

Het Koetshuis is a member of Alliance Gastronomique Néerlandaise.

== See also ==
- List of Michelin starred restaurants in the Netherlands
