= De Treeswijkhoeve =

Restaurant in Waalre, Netherlands

Coordinates: 51°22′21.6″N 5°28′1.64″E

- Interactive map of De Treeswijkhoeve

Restaurant information
- Established: 1988
- Head chef: Dick Middelweerd
- Food type: French, Mediterranean
- Rating: Michelin Guide
- Location: Valkenswaardseweg 14, Waalre, 5582 VB, Netherlands
- Seating capacity: 60
- Website: Official website

De Treeswijkhoeve is a restaurant in Waalre in the Netherlands. It is a fine dining restaurant that was awarded one Michelin star in the period 2006–2012. The restaurant has been awarded two Michelin stars since 2013.

GaultMillau awarded the restaurant 18 out of 20 points in 2014.

Head chef of De Treeswijkhoeve is Dick Middelweerd. The restaurant became a member of the Alliance Gastronomique Néerlandaise in 2003.

De Treeswijkhoeve is housed in a 1916-built farmhouse, formerly belonging to the Estate Treeswijkhoeve. In 1988, the parents-in-law of Dick Middelweerd, bought the farmhouse and started the restaurant. Middelweerd himself joined the restaurant in 1991, as head chef. Together with his wife Anne-Laura, he bought the restaurant in 2000.

== See also ==
- List of Michelin starred restaurants in the Netherlands
