= De Wanne =

Coordinates: 52°24′26.9″N 6°54′41.02″E

- Interactive map of De Wanne

Restaurant information
- Established: 1968
- Head chef: Gerhard Müller
- Food type: French, Mediterranean, International
- Rating: Michelin Guide
- Location: Winhofflaan 2, Ootmarsum, 7631 HX, Netherlands

Restaurant De Wanne is a defunct restaurant located in Hotel De Wiemsel in Ootmarsum, Netherlands. It was a fine dining restaurant that was awarded one Michelin star in the period 1985-1988 and from 1992 to 2014.

In 2014, the parent company of Hotel De Wiemsel came in financial difficulties and went bankrupt. This forced the closure of the restaurant.

Head chef of De Wanne was Gerhard Müller. He left in 2014. In 1981, head chef was Johan Neppelerbroek.

Originally, restaurant De Wanne was located at Stobbenkamp 2. Although the restaurant was on the westside, it belonged to Hotel De Wiemsel, located at the eastside of town. The hotel solved this by running a maroon Daimler limousine to transport the guests between hotel and restaurant. Later, it moved to an adjacent purpose-built building and the limousine was sold.

De Wanne is a former member of the Alliance Gastronomique Néerlandaise.

== See also ==
- List of Michelin starred restaurants in the Netherlands
