= Het Oude Jachthuis =

Coordinates: 52°46′37.03″N 6°26′46.32″E

- Interactive map of Het Oude Jachthuis

Restaurant information
- Food type: French
- Location: Eursinge 2, Eursinge, Pesse, 7935 AB, Netherlands

Het Oude Jachthuis is a restaurant in Eursinge, near Pesse, in the Netherlands. It was a fine dining restaurant that was awarded one Michelin star in 1966 and retained that rating until 1980.

Arnold van Doesburg was the head chef and owner of the restaurant in the period 1960–2005.

Het Oude Jachthuis, represented by Arnold van Doesburg, was one of the founders of Alliance Gastronomique Néerlandaise The family Van Doesburg still runs Het Oude Jachthuis, but added a bed and breakfast in 2005.

The restaurant is located in a former farm/village pub, close to the A28. It is a listed building.

In 1967, during a visit to the province Drenthe, Prince Claus was received in Het Oude Jachthuis by the provincial officials.

== See also ==
- List of Michelin starred restaurants in the Netherlands
