= Carelshaven =

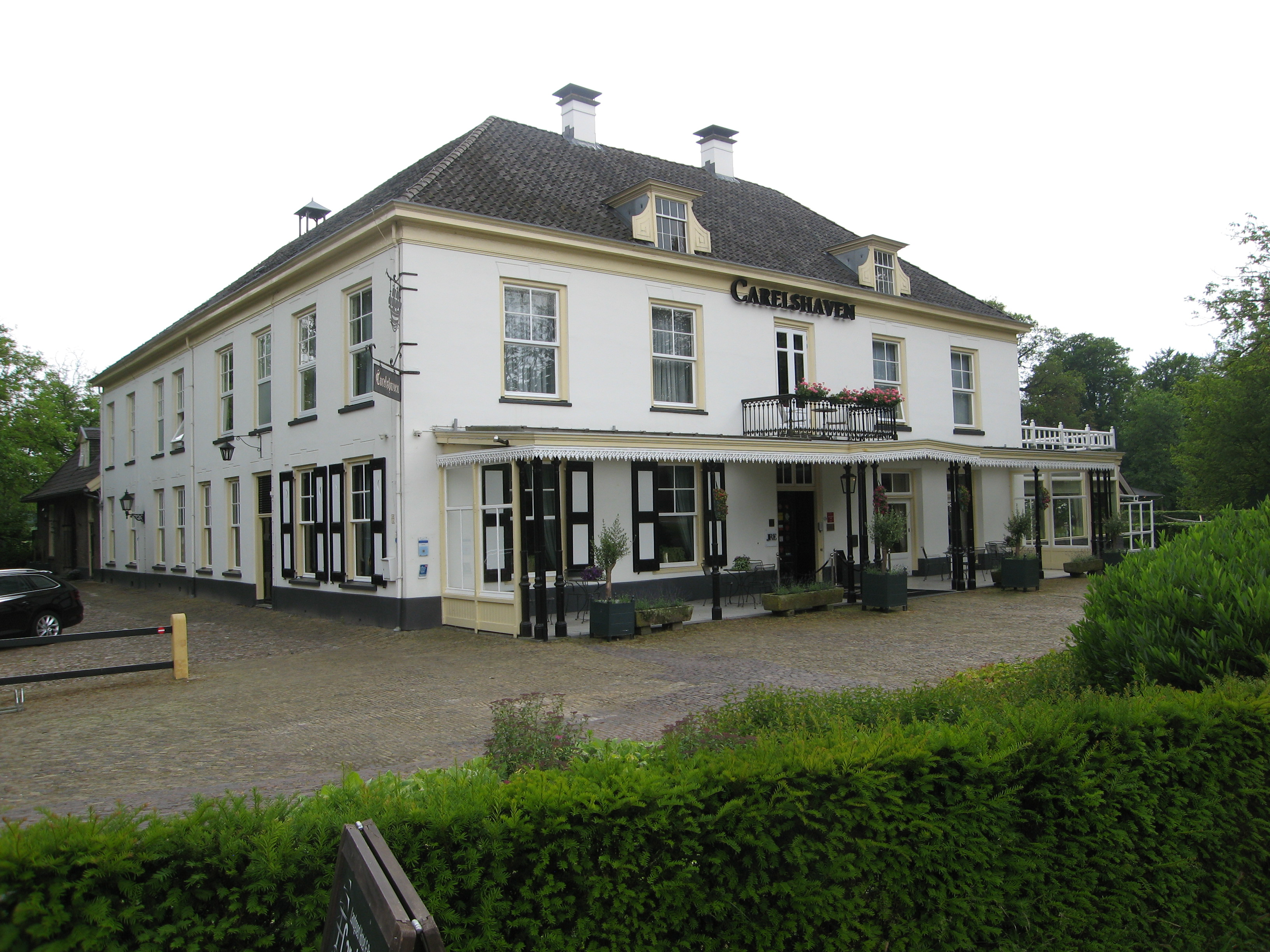
- Interactive map of Carelshaven

Restaurant information
- Food type: French
- Location: Hengelosestraat 30, Delden, 7491 BR, Netherlands
- Coordinates: 52°15′48″N 6°43′52″E
- Website: carelshaven.nl

Carelshaven is a defunct restaurant and hotel in Delden, Netherlands. It had a fine dining restaurant that was awarded one Michelin star in 1973 and retained that rating until 1986.

The hotel closed it doors after Christmas 2013, after being in operation for 237 years. It was owned by the Kluver family for six generations. It reopened under new owners and management on 1 August 2014.

De building in which Carelshaven is housed, is originally built in 1772. It was built as an inn, to serve travellers along the Twickelervaart (canal), who often stopped for the night in the small harbour. Earl Carel George van Wassenaer Obdam, Lord of Twickel, ordered the building of the inn and the canal.

Carelshaven is one of the founders of Alliance Gastronomique Neerlandaise. In 1967, owner was J.E. Kluvers.

== See also ==
- List of Michelin starred restaurants in the Netherlands
