= Chalet Royal =

Restaurant in Den Bosch, the Netherlands

Coordinates: 51°40′58.06″N 5°17′41.57″E

- Interactive map of Chalet Royal

Restaurant information
- Established: 1937
- Head chef: Gerrit Greveling
- Rating: Michelin Guide
- Location: Wilhelminaplein 1, Den Bosch, Netherlands

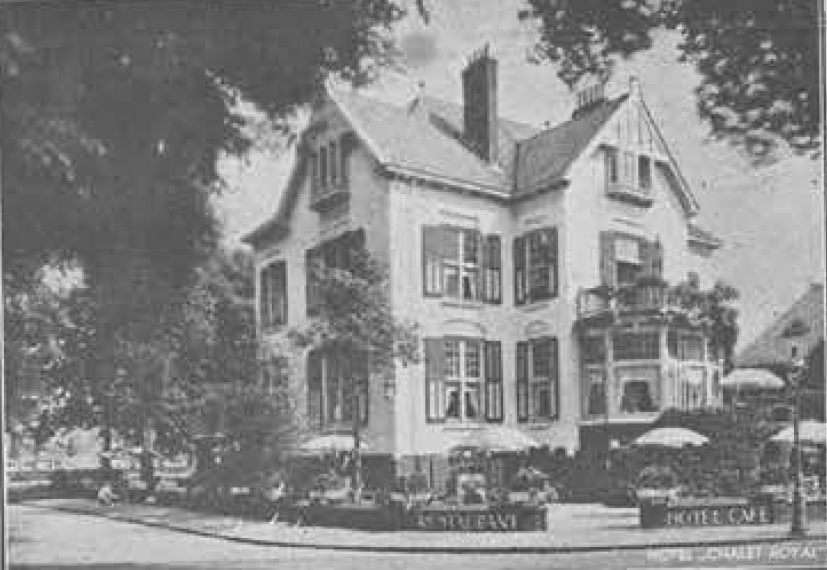
Chalet Royal ca. 1940

Chalet Royal was a restaurant in Den Bosch in the Netherlands. It was a fine dining restaurant that held one Michelin star in the periods 1958-1976 and 1998-2011.

Chalet Royal was one of the founders of the Alliance Gastronomique Neerlandaise in 1967.

Kees van Gaalen founded “Chalet Royal” in 1937 as a hotel-restaurant. He was already owner of restaurant "Royal" in the Visstraat, when he decided to branch out and buy the villa. After a complete renovation of the villa, it opened in 1937 for the public.

Head chef in the first star period Harry van Engelen. His successor was Toine Hermsen, who was unable to retain the star.

The restaurant was forced to close in 2011, when the owner of the building wanted to make better use of it. Chalet Royal, user of about 350 square metres of the about 1500 square metres big building, did not fit in the new plan. Buying the building was not possible for restaurant owner and head chef Gerrit Greveling.

After that, the Chalet Royal building was substantially renovated. The building houses two entrepreneurs: Edwin Kats and Mark Peet Visser. Edwin Kats, who received his first Michelin star in 1995, for restaurant De Swaen, and his second star in 2002, for restaurant La Rive, runs restaurant Noble with a contemporary and international concept. Mark Peet Visser exhibits his art collection in a newly built wing of the building.

== See also ==
- List of Michelin starred restaurants in the Netherlands
