= De Witte (restaurant) =

- Interactive map of De Witte

Restaurant information
- Established: 1922
- Rating: Michelin Guide
- Location: Utrechtseweg 2, Amersfoort, Netherlands

De Witte is a defunct restaurant in Amersfoort in the Netherlands. It was a fine dining restaurant that was awarded one Michelin stars in 1960 and retained that rating until 1981.

The hotel-café-restaurant was established in a villa in 1922. Originally, it was named "Ter Horst". In 1925, after being sold to C.J.G. Hastrich, it was renamed to "De Witte". In 1956 the villa was replaced by a purpose-built building, but father Hastrich was not there anymore, having died in 1955 just before the rebuilding. Son Ernst Hastrich took over.

Its owner in the Michelin era was Ernst Hastrich, founder and chairperson of the Alliance Gastronomique Neerlandaise.

After closure of the hotel and restaurant in 1988, it was changed into a Chinese-Indonesian restaurant called Boeddha. Restaurant De Wok, successor of restaurant Boeddha, was closed down by the local government in March 2006 due to fire and safety issues. The 1956 building was knocked down in 2006 and was to be replaced by a bank building. Bankruptcy of the Van Hoogevest Groep prevented that and the property was left undeveloped. In 2010 there was again an initiative to build, this time for an office building.

== See also ==
- List of Michelin starred restaurants in the Netherlands
