= De Karpendonkse Hoeve =

Coordinates: 51°27′12.28″N 5°29′51.95″E

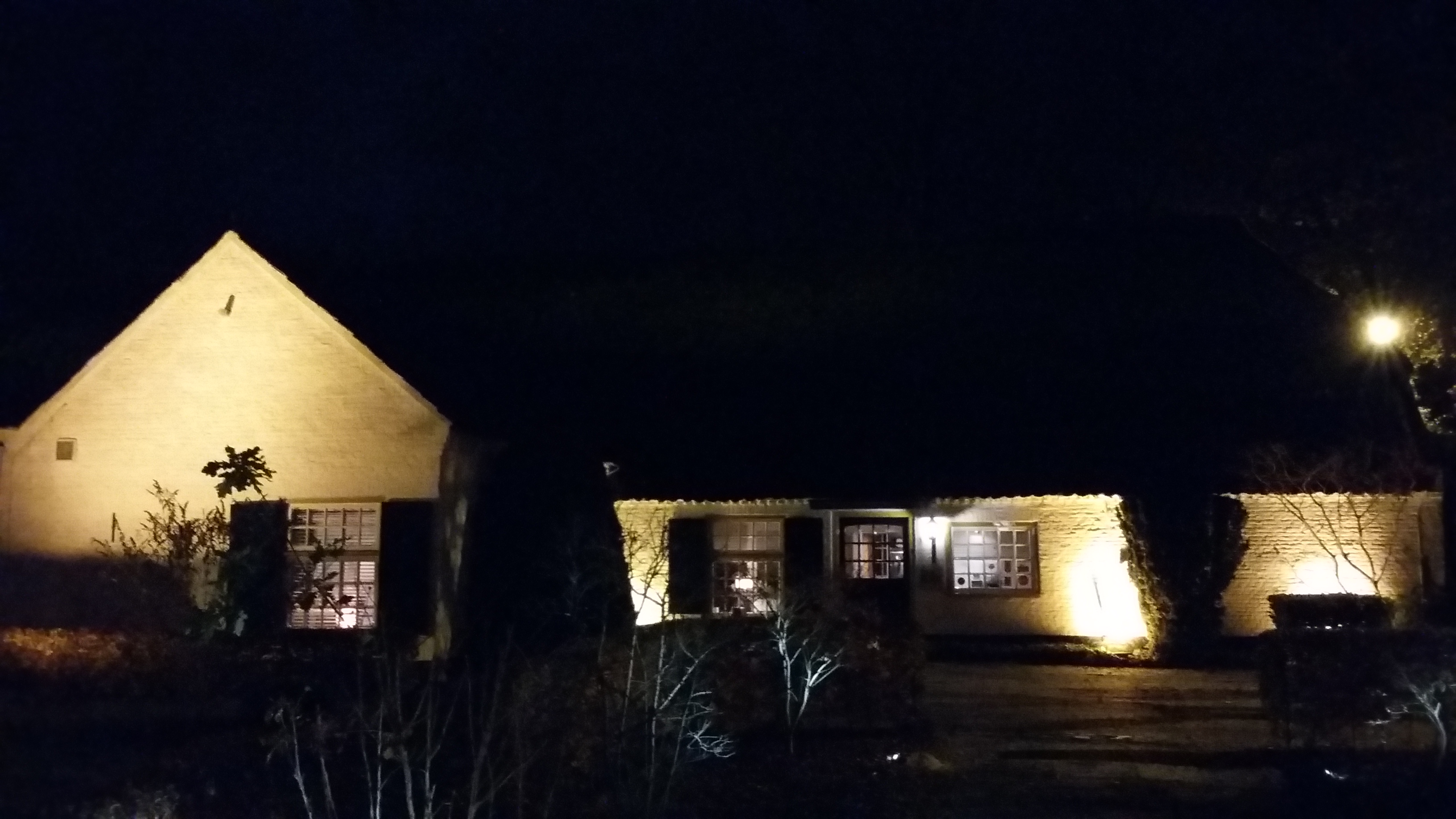
- De Karpendonkse Hoeve, entrance
- Interactive map of De Karpendonkse Hoeve

Restaurant information
- Established: 1973
- Owner: 2021
- Head chef: Peter Koehn and Rob van der Veeken
- Food type: French
- Rating: Michelin Guide
- Location: Sumatralaan 3, Eindhoven, 5631 AA, Netherlands
- Seating capacity: 50
- Website: Official website

De Karpendonkse Hoeve wss a restaurant located in Eindhoven in the Netherlands. It was a fine dining restaurant, earning a Michelin star from 1979 until its closure in 2021.

Head chef was Peter Koehn. In 1980, Koehn took over from Peter Willems, who had earned the Michelin star in 1979. In September 2017, Koehn announced his upcoming retirement and that the second head chef Rob van der Veeken would take over.

Leo van Eeghem founded the restaurant in 1973.; its last owner was his daughter, Ingrid van Eeghem.

Occasionally, guest chefs were invited at the restaurant, including Paula DaSilva, runner up of Hell's Kitchen (U.S. season 5) and the Japanese chef Katsumasa Kitajima, known for kaiseki ryōri cuisine.

In 2007, De Karpendonkse Hoeve celebrated their 30th Michelin star in a row and in 2014 their 35th.

== See also ==
- List of Michelin-starred restaurants in the Netherlands
