= De Kersentuin =

Coordinates: 52°21′3.48″N 4°52′26.7″E

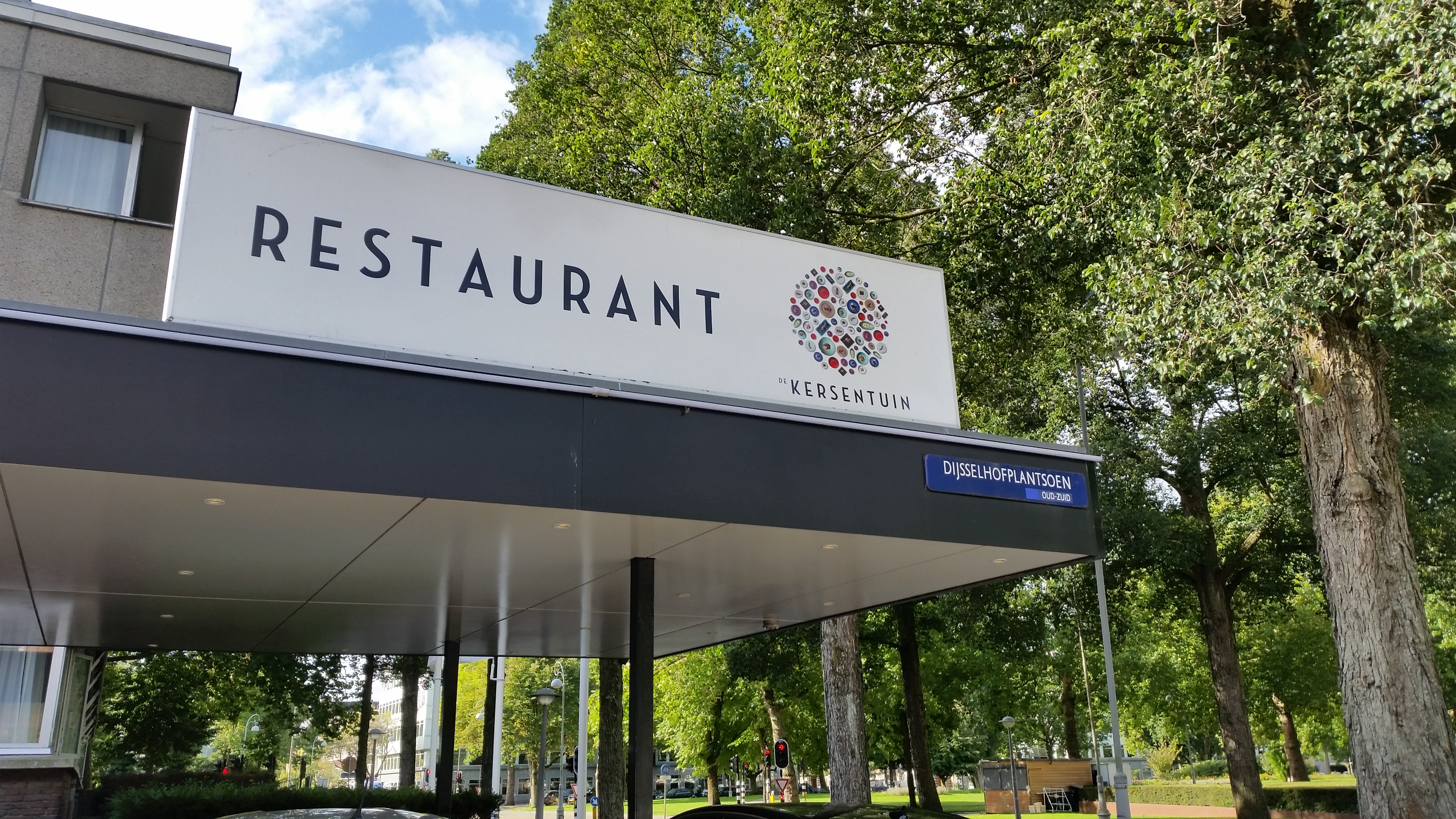
- De Kersentuin in 2020
- Interactive map of De Kersentuin

Restaurant information
- Established: 1980
- Food type: French
- Rating: Michelin Guide
- Location: Dijsselhofplantsoen 7, Amsterdam, 1077 BJ, Netherlands
- Seating capacity: 100
- Website: Official website

Restaurant De Kersentuin is a restaurant in Amsterdam, in the Netherlands. It was a fine dining restaurant that was awarded one Michelin star in 1985 and retained that rating until 1992. Gault Millau awarded the restaurant 13 out of 20 points.

The restaurant was famous not only because of the Michelin star, but also because it belonged to the front runners of the nouvelle cuisine. In 2003, Sistermans admitted that he and Joop Braakhekke did not understand the real nouvelle cuisine.

The present head chef is Michel van Dijk. Former head chefs are: Jon Sistermans (1980-1994), Rudolf Bos (1994-1997), Guus Vredenburg (1997-2000), Michel van der Kroft (2000-2006) and Marcel de Leeuw (2006-2011)

Joop Braakhekke (1980-1993) came to fame in De Kersentuin, but was not the head chef. He acted as restaurant-manager and Maître d'hôtel, until fired in 1993.

Restaurant De Kersentuin was housed in the Garden Hotel, formerly part of the Dikker & Thijs Group and now part of the Bilderberg Group.

In 2004, the whole Queens Moat Houses, parent company of the Bilderberg Group, was sold to "Whitehall", part of Goldman Sachs.

Restaurant De Kersentuin closed in 2020.

== See also ==
- List of Michelin starred restaurants in the Netherlands
