= De Beukenhof =

Former restaurant in Oegstgeest, The Netherlands

Coordinates: 52°10′35.59″N 4°28′11.59″E

- Interactive map of De Beukenhof

Restaurant information
- Established: 1948
- Closed: November 12, 2014
- Food type: French, International
- Location: Terweeweg 2-4, Oegstgeest, 2341 CR, Netherlands
- Seating capacity: 70

De Beukenhof was a hotel-restaurant located in Oegstgeest, Netherlands. It was a former fine dining restaurant that was awarded one or two Michelin stars since 1957 up to 1995. The restaurant closed in 2014, due to bankruptcy.

Head chef in the time of the Michelin stars was Koos van Fulpen. He retired in 1995.

== Notable events ==
In 1991, the opening of an art exhibition caused a huge turn out of the police. The watercolours were made by the biologist-artist Janneke Brinkman-Salentijn. As wife of politician Elco Brinkman, the opening attracted politicians like Ruud Lubbers, Koos Andriessen and Hans van Mierlo.

In 1997, the first official presentation of the new harvest of caviar was celebrated in the restaurant. Importer J. Toet organized this event.

== Star history ==
- 1957-1965: two stars
- 1966-1975: one star
- 1976-1980: no stars
- 1981-1983: one star
- 1984-1986: two stars
- 1987-1995: one star

== See also ==
- List of Michelin starred restaurants in the Netherlands
