= Nolet Het Reymerswale =

Coordinates: 51°29′43.02″N 4°3′3.86″E

- Interactive map of Nolet Het Reymerswale

Restaurant information
- Owner: Danny Nolet
- Head chef: Danny Nolet
- Food type: International Fish
- Rating: Michelin Guide
- Location: Yerseke, Netherlands
- Seating capacity: 60

Nolet Het Reymerswale is a defunct restaurant in Yerseke in the Netherlands. It was a fine dining restaurant that was awarded one Michelin star in 1976 and retained that rating until 2010.

First head chef to earn the Michelin star, in 1976, was father Theo Nolet. From around 1993 son Danny Nolet was in command. The restaurant closed down in October 2010, a victim of the economic recession.

== See also ==
- List of Michelin starred restaurants in the Netherlands
