= 't Ganzenest =

Coordinates: 52°2′13.48″N 4°20′44.71″E

- Interactive map of 't Ganzenest

Restaurant information
- Established: 1987, 2020
- Closed: 2007
- Head chef: Harry Visbeen (previously) Erik Tas (current)
- Food type: Dutch
- Rating: Michelin Guide
- Location: Delftweg 58a, Rijswijk, 2289 AL, Netherlands
- Website: https://ganzenest.nl

't Ganzenest (transl. The Goose Nest) is a restaurant in Rijswijk, Netherlands. The restaurant was opened in 1987 by Harry Visbeen and held a Michelin star for nine years. The restaurant closed in 2008. Erik Tas reopened the restaurant in 2020 and it has held a Michelin star again since 2022.

== Location ==
The restaurant was formerly located in The Hague, at the addresses Groenewegje 75-a and Groenewegje 115. It moved to Rijswijk in 1999.

== History ==
=== Under Visbeen ===
Chef Harry Visbeen opened the eatery in 1987 in The Hague. From 1994 to 2002 and in 2005, 't Ganzenest held a Michelin star and it received a Bib Gourmand in 2003. The restaurant moved to Rijswijk in 1999, where it was located until its closure in 2007. The restaurant closed in 2007, due to financial troubles and the threat of bankruptcy caused by a recession.

=== Under Tas ===
In September 2020, 't Ganzenest reopened after Erik Tas took over. This is his third restaurant. In 2022, it received another Michelin star, and has kept the award since. In 2024, the restaurant had 15.5 out of 20 points in the GaultMillau guide. The restaurant is in the top 500 of the Dutch culinary guide Lekker.

== See also ==
- List of Michelin starred restaurants in the Netherlands
