= De Zwaan (restaurant) =

Coordinates: 51°34′10.86″N 4°38′7.45″E

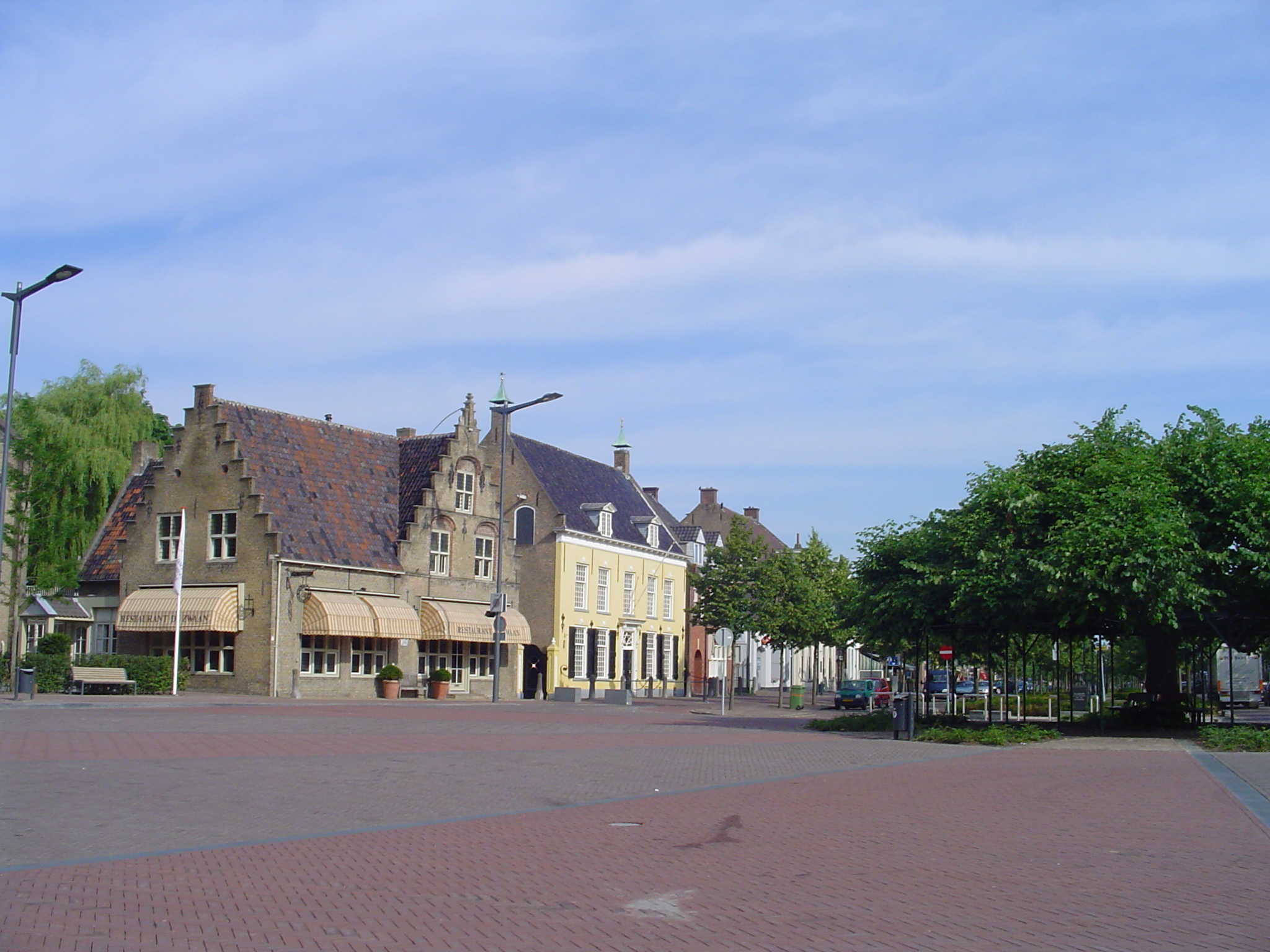
- Interactive map of De Zwaan

Restaurant information
- Established: 1957
- Head chef: Carlo Chantrel
- Food type: French, International
- Rating: Michelin Guide
- Location: Markt 7, Etten-Leur, 4875 CB, Netherlands
- Seating capacity: 60
- Website: Official website

Restaurant De Zwaan is a restaurant located in Etten-Leur, in the Netherlands. It is a fine dining restaurant that was awarded one Michelin star in the period 1994–present.

Gault Millau awarded the restaurant 16 out of 20 points.

Head chef of De Zwaan is Carlo Chantrel. Former head chefs include John Jansen (1991).

De Zwaan is a member and one of the founders of Alliance Gastronomique Néerlandaise.

The restaurant celebrated its 50th anniversary in 2007. Part of the celebrations were cooking-sessions of other famous head chefs: Jonnie Boer, Ron Blauw, Lucas Rive and Marc van Gulick. The restaurant was started by Ad Peijnenborg, father of present owner Roland Peijnenburg and member of the family who owned ontbijtkoek-firm Koninklijke Peijnenburg. The transition of ownership from father to son was planned for the end of 1991. Due to the unexpected death of his father, the takeover was advanced.

In 2009, restaurant De Zwaan (The Swan) started with a bistro in the same building. This bistro was called "Het Lelijke Eendje" (The Ugly Duckling).

The building is a Rijksmonument.

== See also ==
- List of Michelin starred restaurants in the Netherlands
