= Hostellerie De Hamert =

Former restaurant in Wellerlooi, Netherlands

Coordinates: 51°30′22.2″N 6°10′12.46″E

- Interactive map of Hostellerie De Hamert

Restaurant information
- Established: 1948
- Head chef: Harold Kok
- Food type: Local, French
- Location: Hamert 2, Wellerlooi, 5856 CL, Netherlands
- Seating capacity: 100
- Website: Official website

Hostellerie De Hamert was a restaurant in Wellerlooi in the Netherlands, most famous for its asparagus dishes in spring. It is a fine dining restaurant that was awarded one Michelin star in 1963 and retained that rating until 1989. GaultMillau awarded the restaurant 12.0 out of 20 points.

Former head chef Herman van Ham took care about the kitchen for 39 years. When Bernard Lieftink took over in 1989, the restaurant lost its star.

Hostellerie De Hamert is one of the founders and still a member of Alliance Gastronomique Neerlandaise.

Hostellerie De Hamert went bankrupt in 2019.

== See also ==
- List of Michelin starred restaurants in the Netherlands
