= Wellerlooi =

- Village
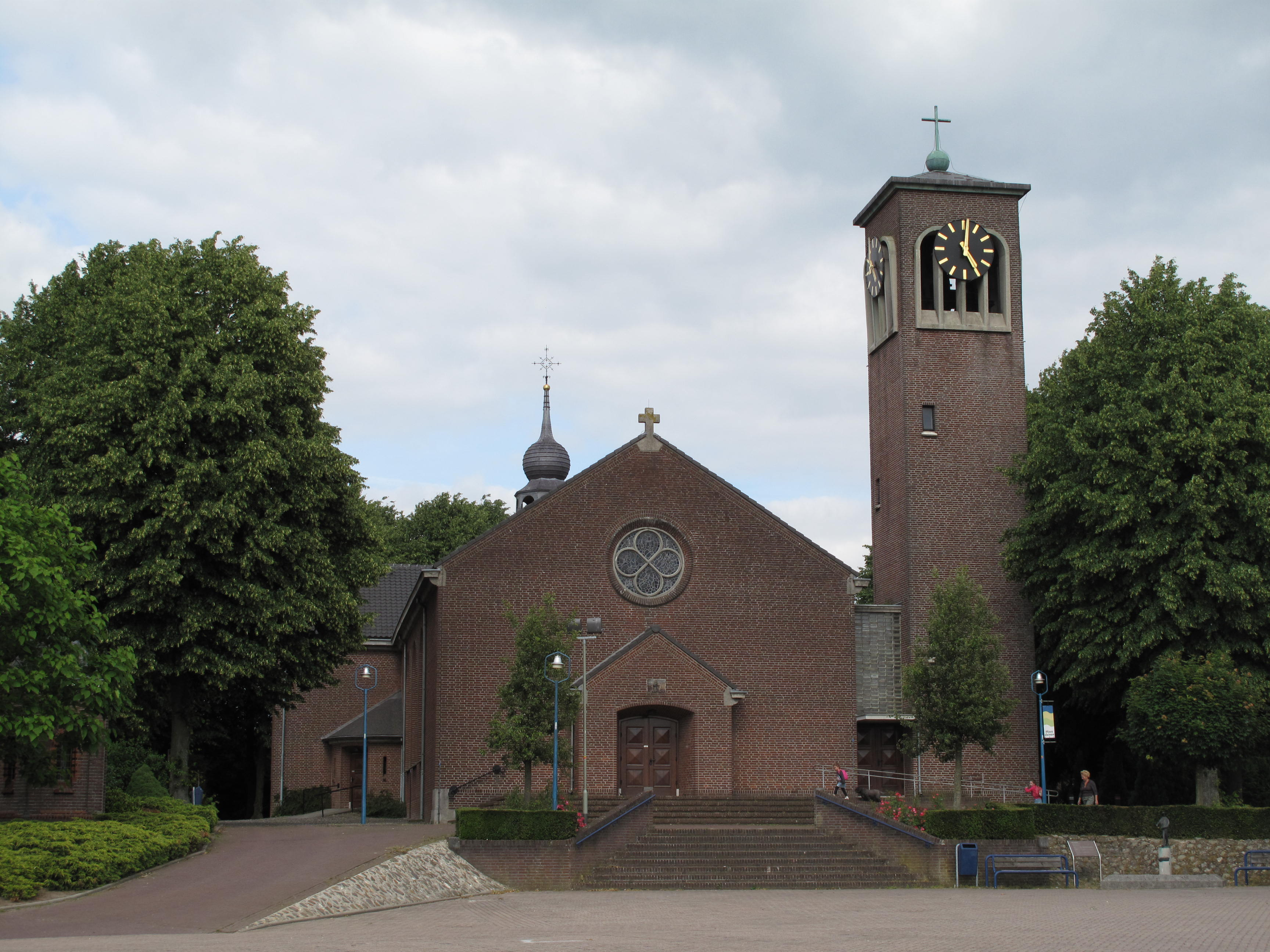
- Church of Wellerlooi

- Location in the Netherlands Location in the province of Limburg in the Netherlands
- Coordinates: 51°32′N 6°8′E
- Country: Netherlands
- Province: Limburg
- Municipality: Bergen

Area
  - Total: 22.27 km^{2} (8.60 sq mi)
- Elevation: 16 m (52 ft)

Population (2021)
  - Total: 1,185
  - Density: 53.21/km^{2} (137.8/sq mi)
- Time zone: UTC+1 (CET)
  - Summer (DST): UTC+2 (CEST)
- Postal code: 5856
- Dialing code: 0478

Wellerlooi (Dutch pronunciation: [ˈʋɛlərloːi]; Limburgish: De Loj [də ˈlɔj]) is a village in the Dutch province Limburg. It is part of the municipality Bergen. This church village is located between Nijmegen and Venlo, on the eastern side of the Maas

Wellerlooi lies in the heart of De Maasduinen National Park. The part of the national park that belongs to Wellerlooi is named De Hamert.

== History ==
The village was first mentioned in 1501 as "'t Welreloo", and means "open forest belonging to Well. Wellerlooi started as a heath cultivation village in the 19th century. Wellerlooi was home to 240 people in 1840.

In 1894, it became an independent parish. The St Catharina Church was built between 1952 and 1953 in traditional style and a tower was added in 1961.

== See also ==
- Hostellerie De Hamert
