= Cordial (restaurant) =

Coordinates: 51°46′4.74″N 5°31′42.97″E

- Interactive map of Cordial

Restaurant information
- Established: September 1998
- Head chef: Joost Verhoeven
- Food type: French
- Rating: Michelin Guide
- Location: Oostwal 175, Oss, 5341 KM, Netherlands
- Seating capacity: 50
- Website: Official website

Cordial is a restaurant in Oss, Netherlands. It is a fine dining restaurant that was awarded one Michelin star for the period 2002–2018.

GaultMillau awarded the restaurant 17 out of 20 points.

Since 2008, head chef of Cordial is Joost Verhoeven. His predecessor was Roger Rassin, who earned the star in 2002.

Cordial is a member of Alliance Gastronomique Néerlandaise since 2009. The restaurant belongs to Hotel De Weverij.

== See also ==
- List of Michelin starred restaurants in the Netherlands
