= De Boerderij (restaurant) =

- Interactive map of De Boerderij

Restaurant information
- Food type: French
- Rating: Michelin Guide
- Location: Korte Leidsedwarsstraat 69, Amsterdam, Netherlands

Restaurant De Boerderij is a defunct restaurant in Amsterdam, the Netherlands. It was a fine dining restaurant that was awarded one Michelin star in the periods 1961–1967 and 1980–1985.

In the first Michelin period, Herman Wunneberg was head chef and owner. Wunneberg had bought the De Boerderij in 1956 and transformed it from a bar into a restaurant. In the second period son Ruud Wunneberg was the owner and head chef.

One of the trainee chefs at De Boerderij was Jonnie Boer. He worked there from 1982 until 1985 when the restaurant closed.

== See also ==
- List of Michelin-starred restaurants in the Netherlands
