= Bosch en Duin =

- Village
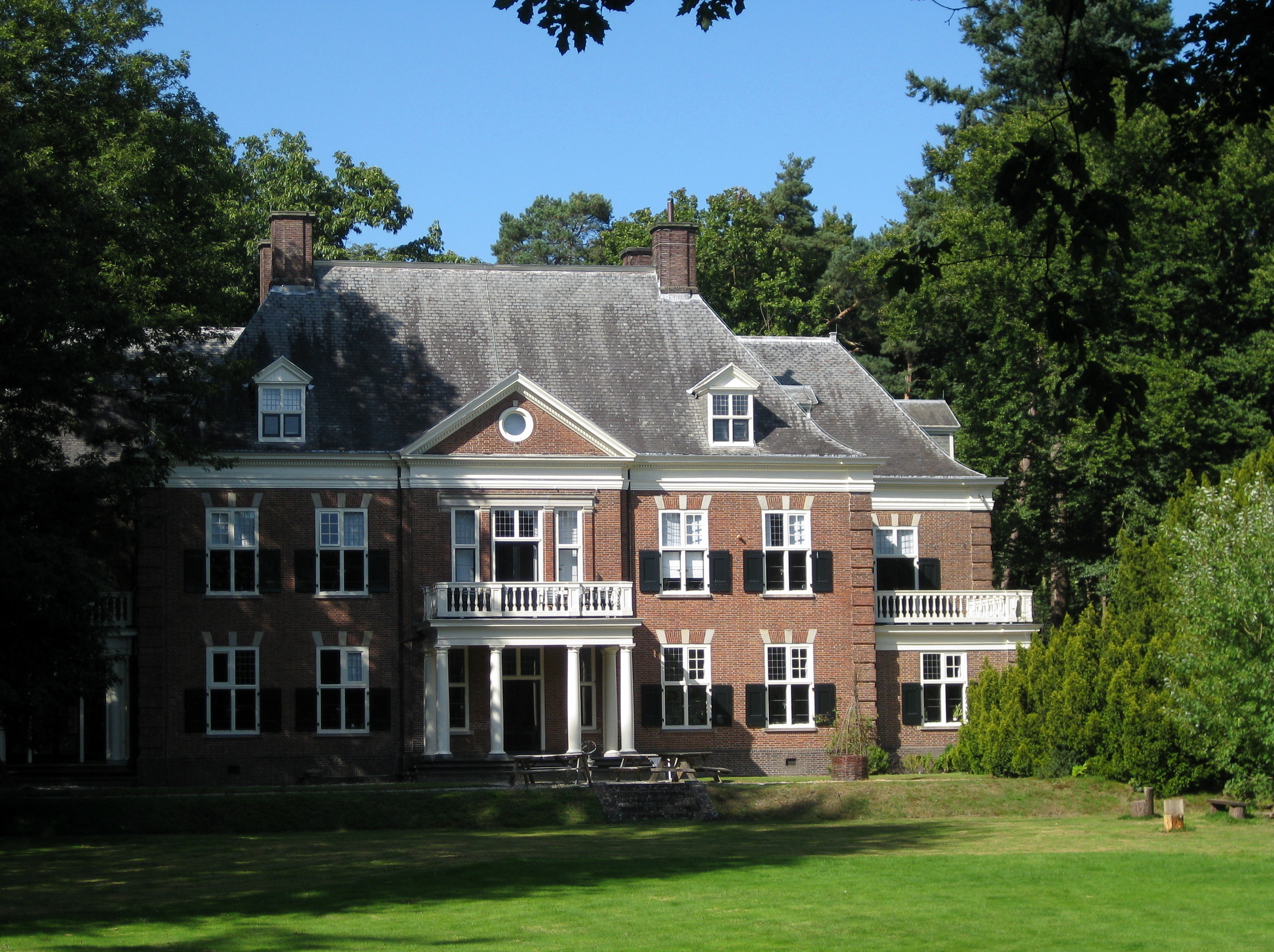
- Huis ter Wege

- Location in the Netherlands Bosch en Duin (Netherlands)
- Coordinates: 52°6′57″N 5°14′22″E
- Country: Netherlands
- Province: Utrecht
- Municipality: Zeist

Area
  - Total: 4.58 km^{2} (1.77 sq mi)
- Elevation: 7 m (23 ft)

Population (2021)
  - Total: 1,720
  - Density: 376/km^{2} (973/sq mi)
- Time zone: UTC+1 (CET)
  - Summer (DST): UTC+2 (CEST)
- Postal code: 3735
- Dialing code: 030

Bosch en Duin is a village in Zeist municipality, in the Dutch province of Utrecht. The village is situated to the north of the town of Zeist, and borders Huis ter Heide to the east and Den Dolder to the north. The village is entirely made up of estates surrounded by forest.

With 70%, Bosch en Duin has the highest percentage of houses worth more than 1 million euros of any town in the Netherlands, and also the highest average house price of all towns in the country.

The estate De Horst in Bosch en Duin, designed by architect Karel de Bazel, is now a protected landmark. Dutch journalist Willem Oltmans grew up here.

== Gallery ==
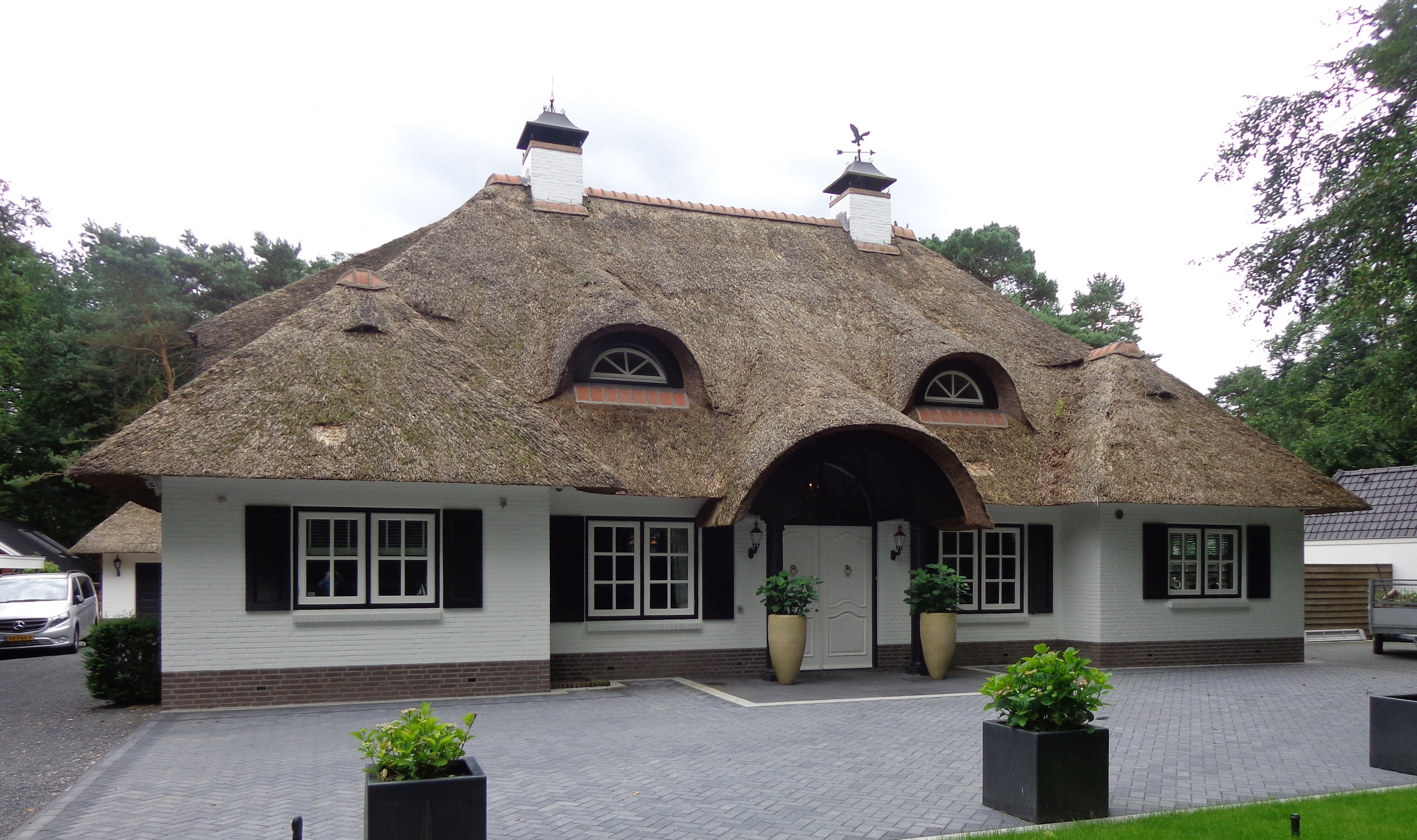
Village in Bosch en Duin

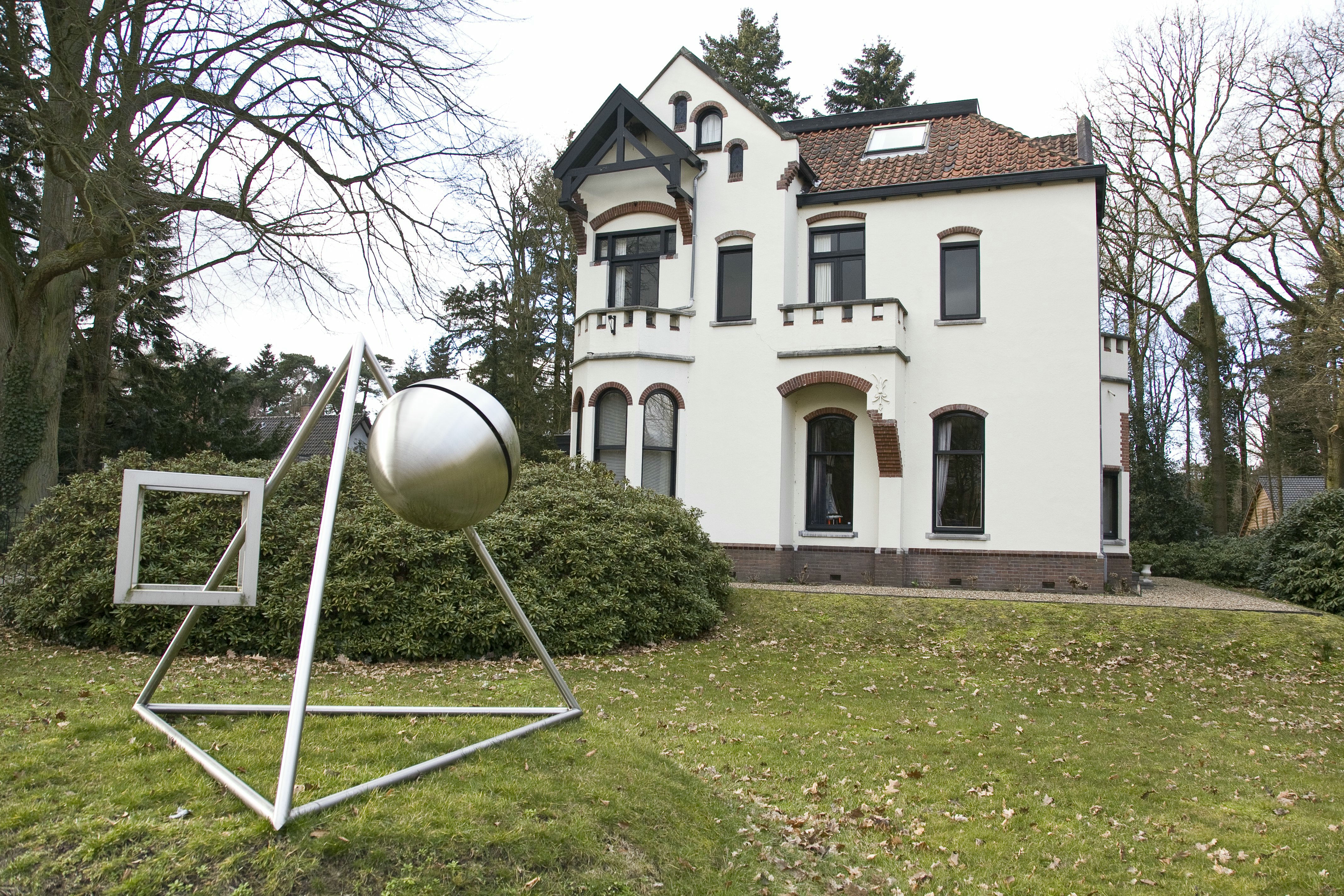
House with art

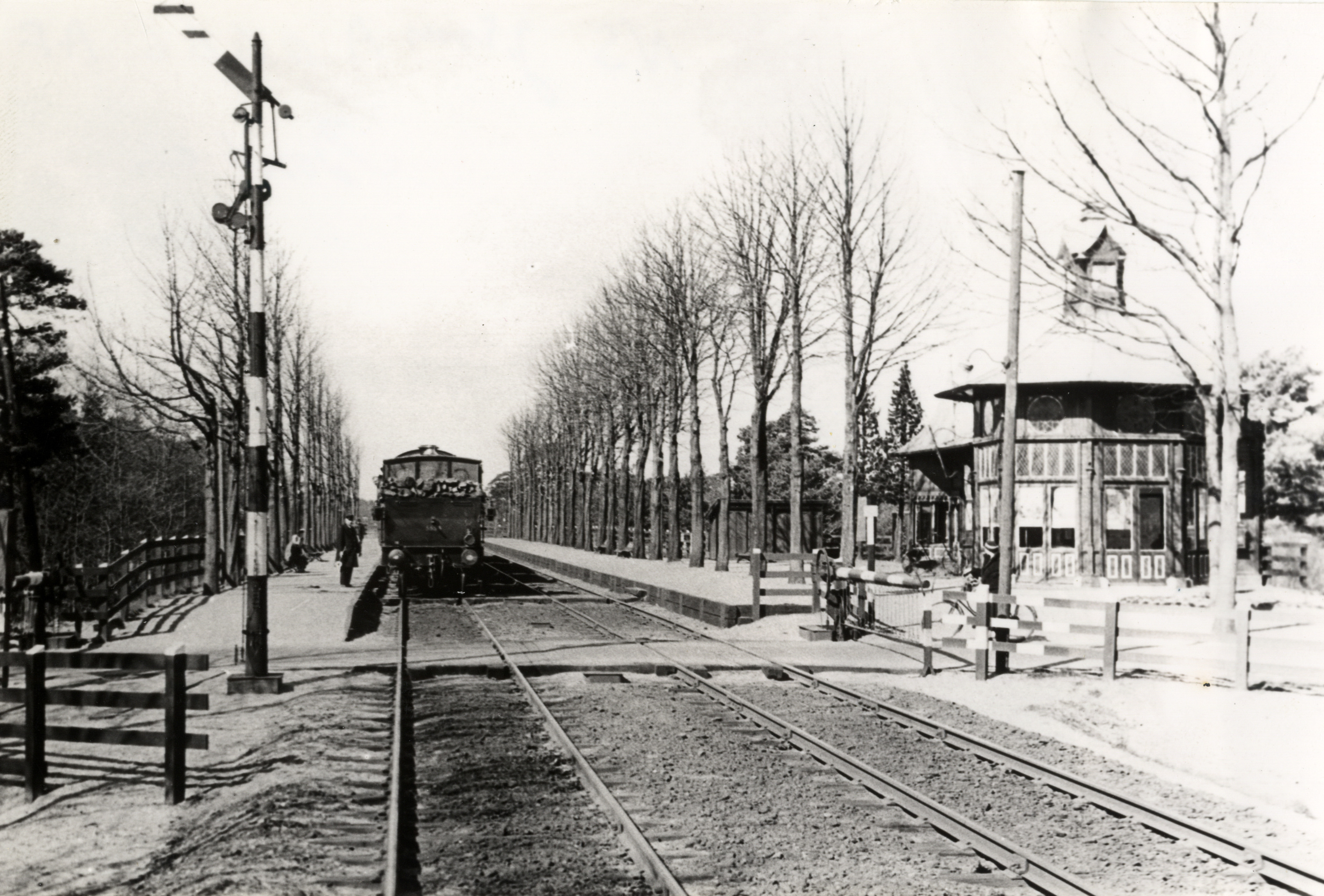
Former train stop
