= Aalst, Buren =

Aalst
- Hamlet
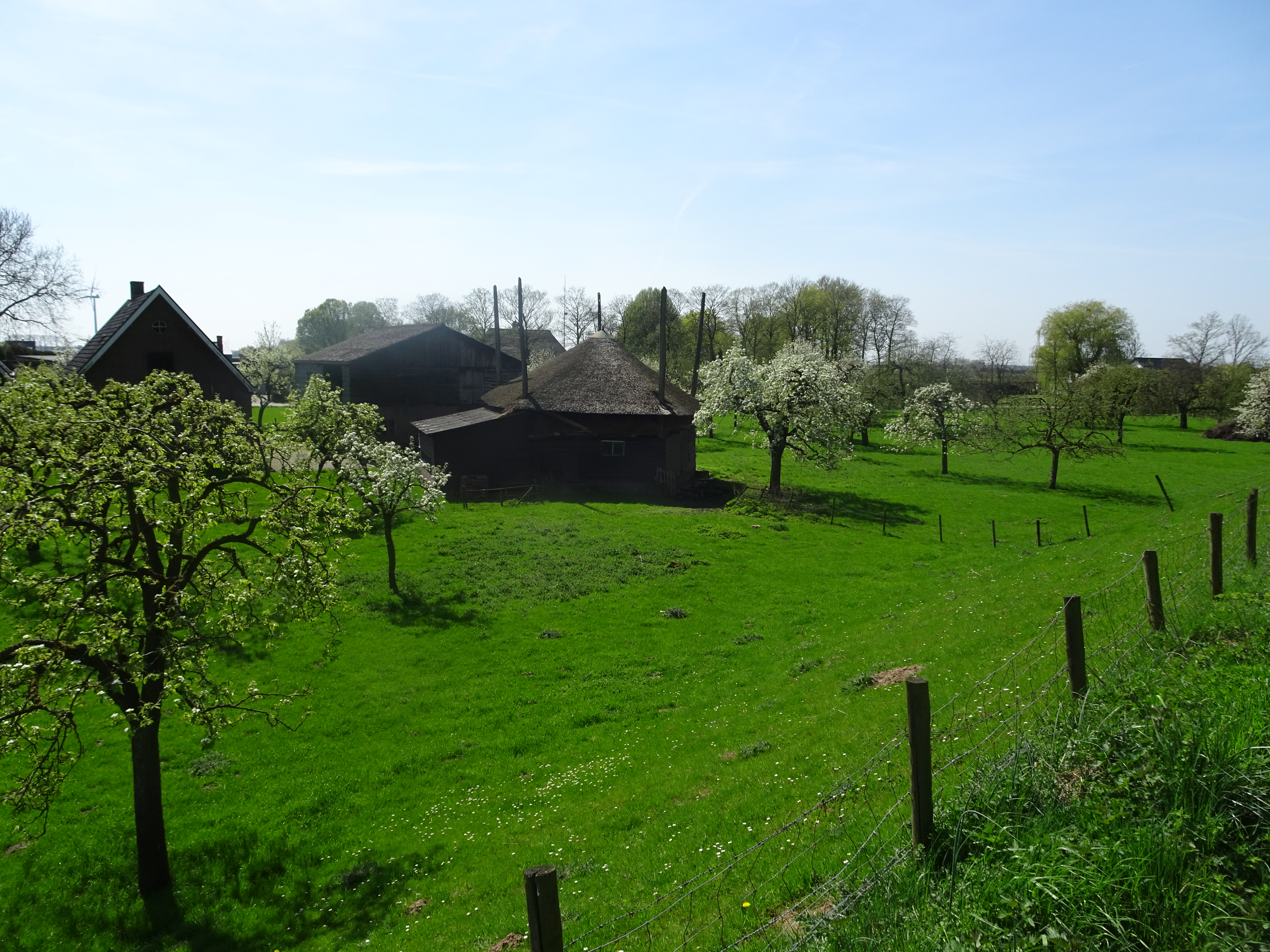
- Hay barrack in Aalst

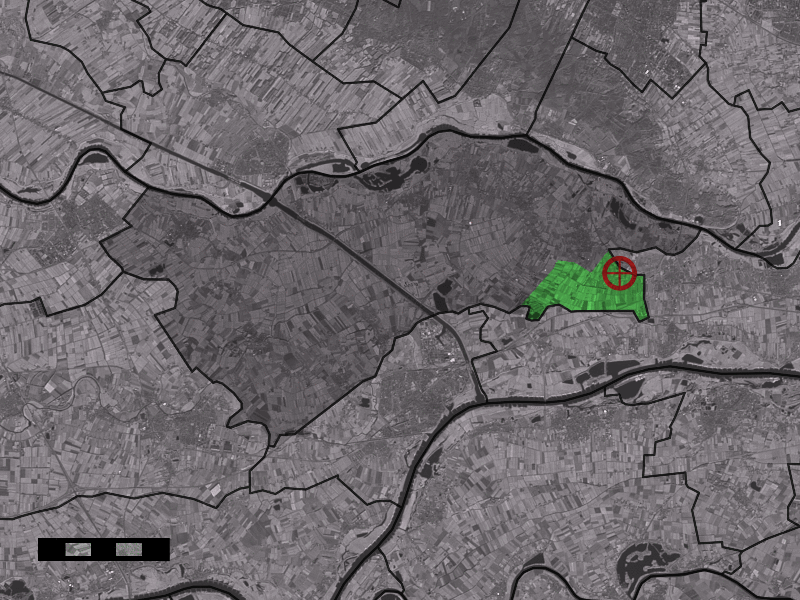
- The hamlet (dark red) and the statistical district (light green) of Aalst in the municipality of Buren.

- Location in the Netherlands Aalst (Netherlands) Aalst (Europe)
- Coordinates: 51°56′03″N 5°32′25″E
- Country: Netherlands
- Province: Gelderland
- Municipality: Buren

Area
  - Total: 7.74 km^{2} (2.99 sq mi)
- Elevation: 7 m (23 ft)

Population (2021)
  - Total: 1,185
  - Density: 153/km^{2} (397/sq mi)
- Time zone: UTC+1 (CET)
  - Summer (DST): UTC+2 (CEST)
- Postal code: 4033
- Dialing code: 0344

Aalst is a hamlet in the Dutch province of Gelderland. It is a part of the municipality of Buren, and lies about 10 km southwest of Wageningen.

Between 1811 and 1998, Aalst belonged to the municipality of Lienden. In the middle of the 19th century, the population of Aalst was 150; there was a nice mansion called "Kolvenschoten" located here.

It was first mentioned around 1400 as Aelst. The etymology is unclear. The postal authorities have placed it under Lienden. In 1840, it was home to 205 people.

== Gallery ==
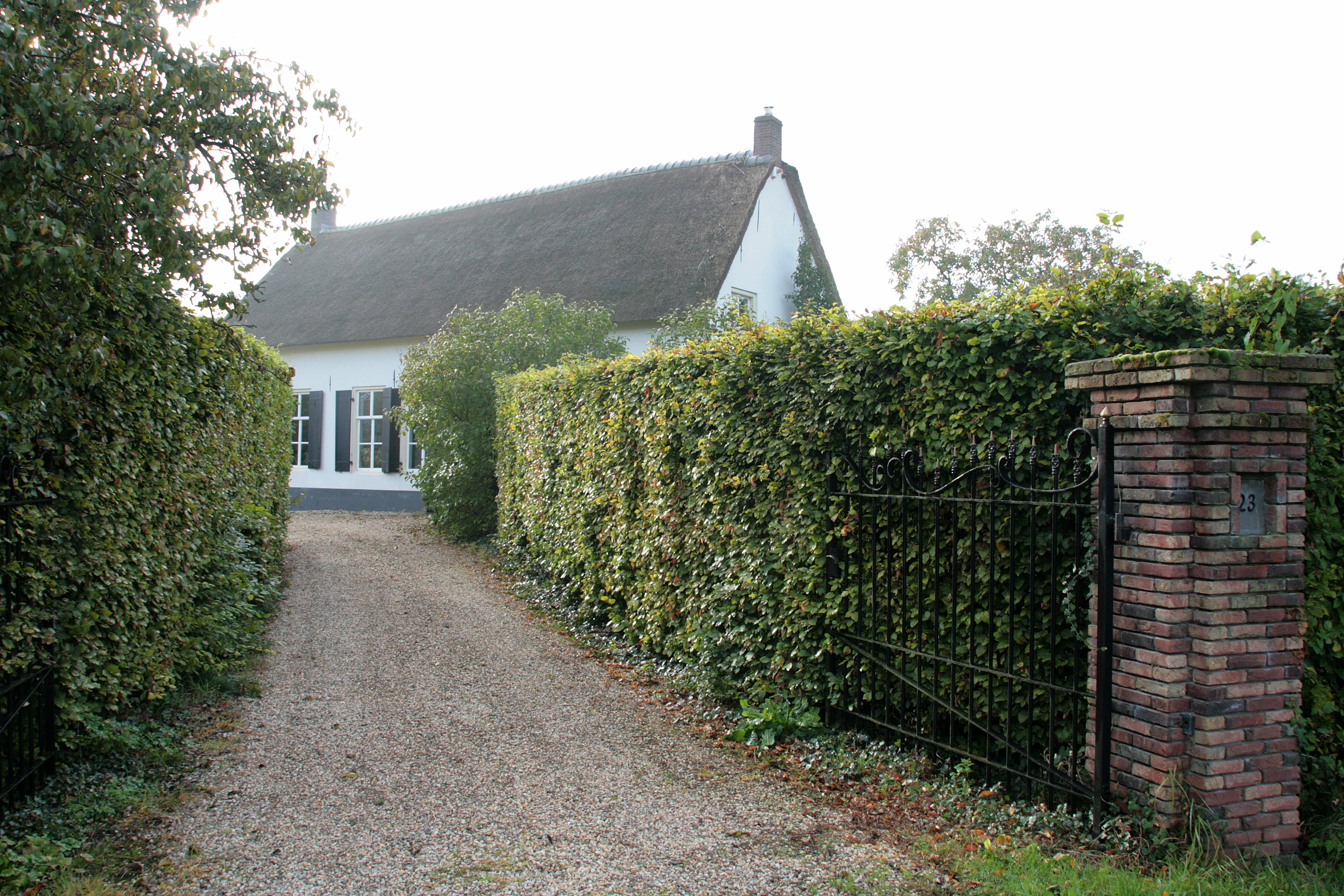
Farm in Aalst

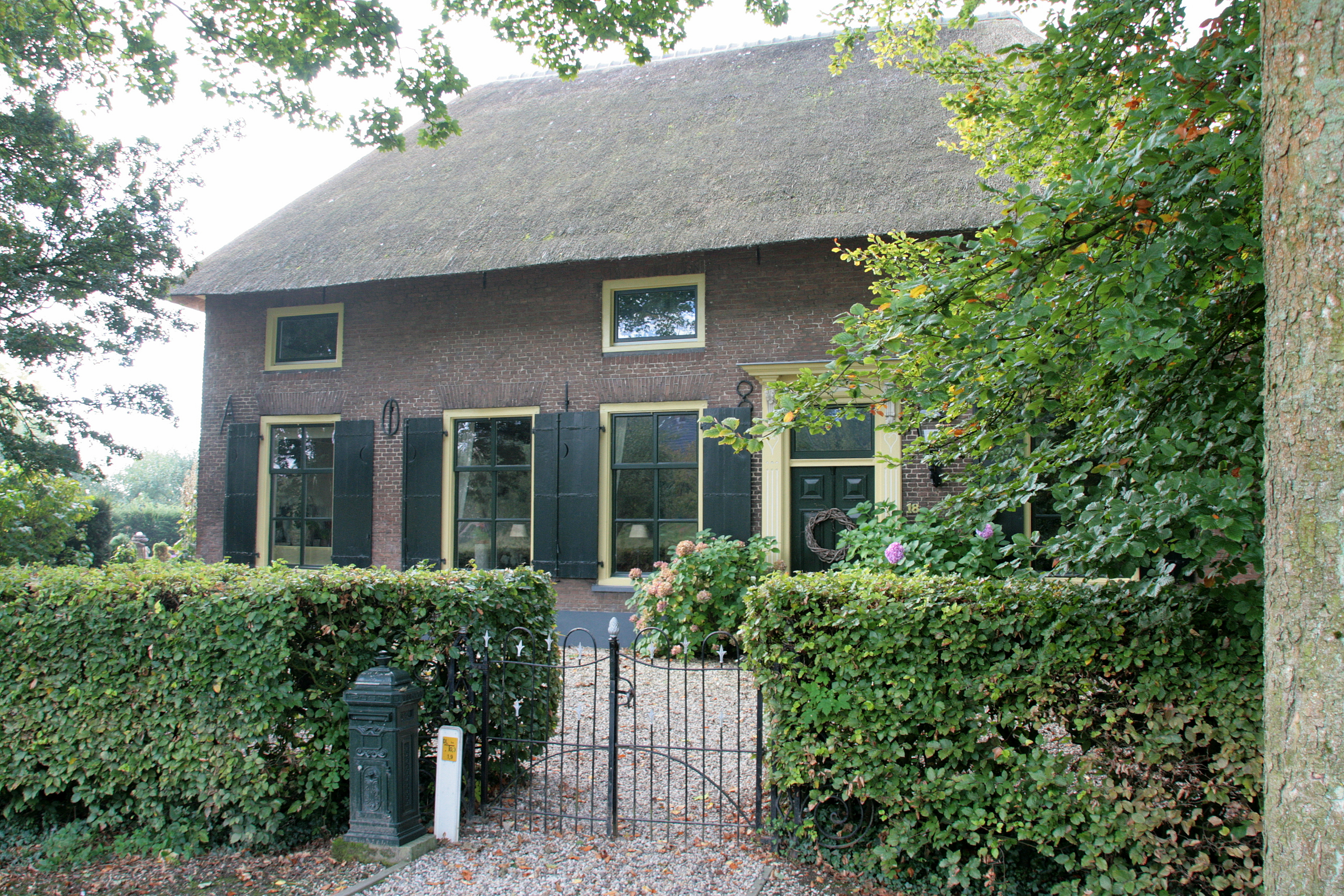
Farm in Aalst
