= Ansky (surname) =

Ansky or Anski is an Israeli surname (אנסקי).

- S. An-sky (1863–1920), Yiddish writer and Russian political activist
- Israeli Ansky family:
  - Eliezer Ansky (1904–1989), Israeli actor
  - Alex Ansky (b. 1939), Israeli actor, son of Eliezer
  - Sherry Ansky (b. 1957), Israeli chef and cookbook author, wife of Alex
  - Michal Ansky (b. 1980), Israeli gastronomist and food journalist, daughter of Alex and Sherry
- Michel Ansky, French historian who wrote about Algerian Jews
- Boris Abramovich Ansky, a hero of Roberto Bolaño's 2666: A Novel

== Other uses ==
- Ansky (black hole)
