= Haim Cohen (disambiguation) =

Haim Cohen is a professor at the Faculty of Life Sciences of Bar Ilan University.

Haim Cohen may also refer to:

- Haim Cohn (1911–2002), Israeli jurist and author, sometimes referred to as Haim Cohen
- Haim Cohen-Meguri (1913–2000), Israeli member of Knesset for Herut and Gahal
- Haim Cohen (chef) (born 1960), Israeli chef, restaurateur and TV personality
