= Shmoné =

Restaurant in New York City

- Interactive map of Shmoné

Restaurant information
- Owner: Eyal Shani/Good People Group
- Head chef: Nadav Greenberg
- Food type: Israeli; Middle Eastern
- Rating: (Michelin Guide)
- Location: 61 West 8th Street, New York City, New York, 10011, United States
- Coordinates: 40°44′01″N 73°59′57″W
- Reservations: Strongly suggested
- Website: www.shmonenyc.com

Shmoné, meaning 8 in Hebrew, is a fine dining Israeli and Middle Eastern restaurant in the Greenwich Village neighborhood of New York City. The restaurant is part of Eyal Shani's Good People Group along with HaSalon, Malka, Port Said, and the fast-casual chain Miznon, and became his first restaurant to earn a Michelin Star earning one in 2023.

== See also ==
- List of Michelin-starred restaurants in New York City
- List of Middle Eastern restaurants
