= Michal Ansky =

Israeli gastronomist, food journalist and television personality

- מיכל אנסקי
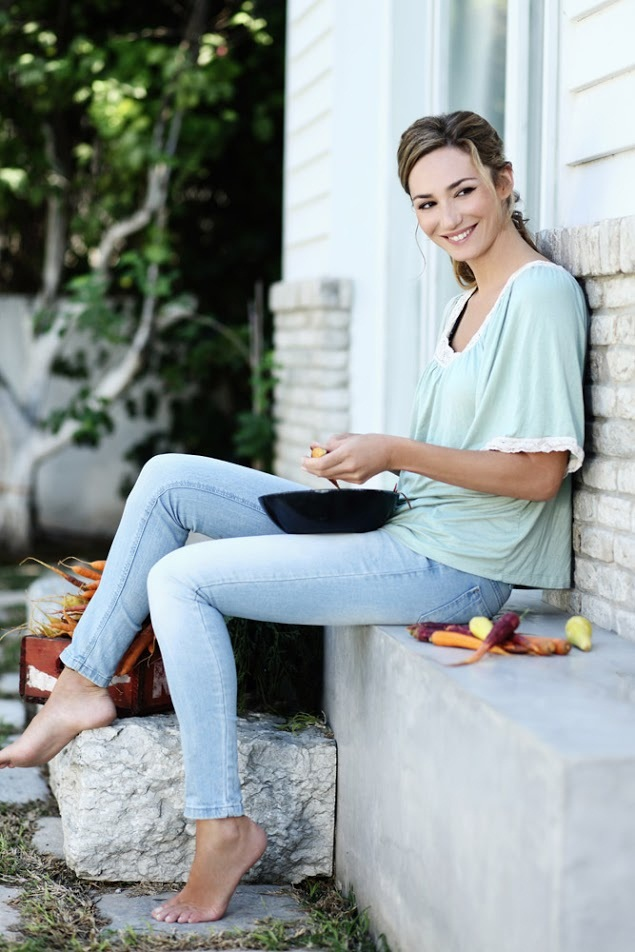
- Michal Ansky in 2012
- Born: 11 October 1980 (age 45); Jerusalem
- Occupations: Journalist; gastronomist; TV presenter

Michal Ansky (Hebrew: מיכל אנסקי; born 11 October 1980), is an Israeli gastronomist, food journalist and television personality.

== Biography ==
Michal Ansky was born Gabrielle Ansky and raised in Jerusalem, to Jewish parents. Her father, Alex Ansky, was born in 1939 as Aleksander Abrabanel in Bulgaria, into a Ladino-speaking household. Her mother Sherry Ansky (née Gavriyahu) was born in Israel, into a Yiddish-speaking Masorti household. Michal Asnky's mother is a journalist and gastronomist, and her father, an actor and radio presenter. Michal's paternal grandfather, Eliezer Ansky, born Abrabanel (1903–1990) was the founder and director of the Bimatenu children's theatre and worked in his sixties as an artist, creating a sculpture for the Tel Aviv Rabbinate and creatively restoring a wall mosaic in the Church of the Holy Sepulchre, among others.

Ansky attended Gymnasia Rehavia high school in Jerusalem. She then served as an officer in the Israeli military (IDF), in the Air Force filming unit. After completing her military service, she continued to do reserve duty as an administrations officer in the Public Relations Unit.

=== Education ===
- 2004 – History and Literature studies at Venice International University
- 2008 – Bachelor of Arts in History and Literature from Tel Aviv University.
- 2009 – Master in Gastronomic Sciences from the Slow Food University of Gastronomic Sciences in Italy, specializing in food products quality.

== Culinary and media career ==
At the age of 17, Ansky wrote a food column for a local Jerusalem newspaper, Kol Ha’ir.

Following the completion of her military service, Ansky wrote a column called "The Missing Piece" (Hahatiha hahasera) for 'Walla' culture website, was part of the all-girl talk show "Girls" (Banot) which aired on Hot Cable network in 2007, and wrote and presented a historical and culinary segment for the TV show "Quality time" (Zman Eichut) which aired in 2007 on Channel 1. In 2008 she worked as a culinary and cultural reporter for Ma'ariv newspaper and also wrote for the gastronomic magazine "The Food Route" (Derech Haochel). In 2009 she participated in "The Dinner Club" (Moa'adon Aruchat Haerev), which aired on Channel 2, as a field reporter.

Later that year, Ansky started hosting two TV cooking shows: "As Fresh As It Gets" alongside Chef Omer Miller and "The Queen of the Market", both focusing on local and organic produce. The TV shows aired for 3 seasons on the Israeli Food Channel and Channel 10.

In late 2010, Ansky began presenting the Israeli version of Master Chef, alongside Chefs Haim Cohen, Eyal Shani and Rafi Adar in Season 1, Cohen, Shani and Yonatan Roshfeld in Seasons 2–6, and Cohen, Shani and Yisrael Aharoni in Seasons 6–10. The show's popularity led to Ansky being invited to join Master Chef USA as a guest judge, along with Chef Gordon Ramsay. In April 2012, Ansky hosted the first season of Junior Master Chef Israel, alongside Haim Cohen, Eyal Shani and Yonatan Rochfeld. In its 2021 season, continues to be one of the hosts of MasterChef Israel, together with Haim Cohen, Eyal Shani and Yisrael Aharoni.

In 2010, she hosted "Cooking from Books" (Mevashlim Mehasfarim) for the Israeli Food Channel.

In December 2012, Ansky gave a talk on food and memories at Tedx Jerusalem, an independently organized TED event.

Ansky currently presents the radio show, "Ansky and Enzel" together with Efrat Enzel, on the 103FM radio station.

== Business career ==
In 2007, Ansky founded the Farmers Market at the Tel Aviv Port, which she currently continues to manage. The purpose of the market, which exists these days in six locations in Israel (Tel Aviv, Beersheba, Raanana, Herzeliya, Holon and Rishon Lezion). is to bring fresh agricultural produce directly from the farmer to the consumer, thereby eliminating commissions and reducing the cost to the consumer.

In 2010, Ansky founded "Shuk Hanamal", the first indoor market in Israel at the Tel Aviv port, together with her husband, the architect Roee Hemed, and Shir Halpern.

In 2015, she was involved in joint culinary ventures with Amir Bramly who invested Rubicon Business Group funds. She also invested her own private funds with Bramly's "Kela fund". In November 2015, following Kela fund's financial difficulties she said in a television interview with Channel 2 news that she lost more than a million NIS (US$250,000). Restaurants which were owned by Bramly's Rubicon Business group but managed and presented under Ansky's name were closed, and some of her future ventures with Bramly, including a planned food market in New York City were cancelled. She managed to salvage some joint ventures with a court approved "divorce" restructuring, so that they reverted fully to her name in return for a 1.2 million NIS payment to Rubicon.

In August 2021, Ansky opened a branch of Sherry Herring, a sandwich shop offering herring sandwiches served with a shot of vodka, in Manhattan's Upper West Side. The original shop was opened by Ansky in Tel Aviv and is named after her mother

== Personal life ==
Ansky was married to architect Roi Hemed, with whom she had one daughter, before they divorced in 2013. In October 2019, she married a businessman Eyal Amir, and had another daughter.

In 2019 she fell ill with Bell's palsy.

== Bibliography ==
Ansky's first cookbook, "'Food from Home", was published in January 2013.

== Gallery ==
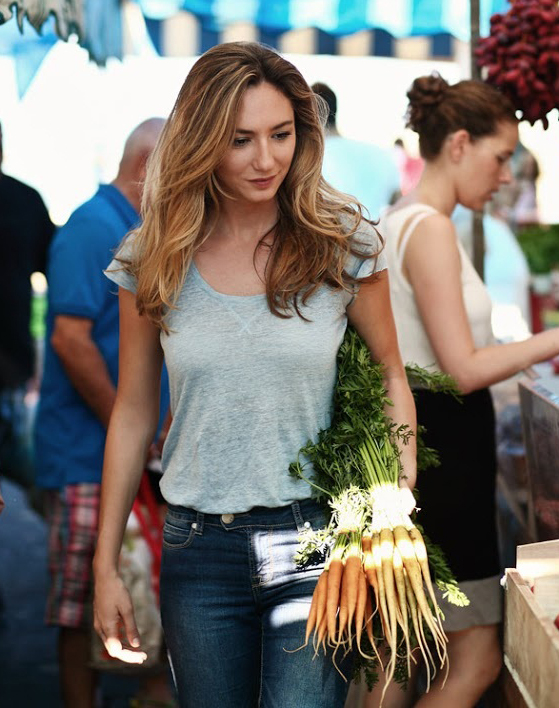
Ansky in 2015

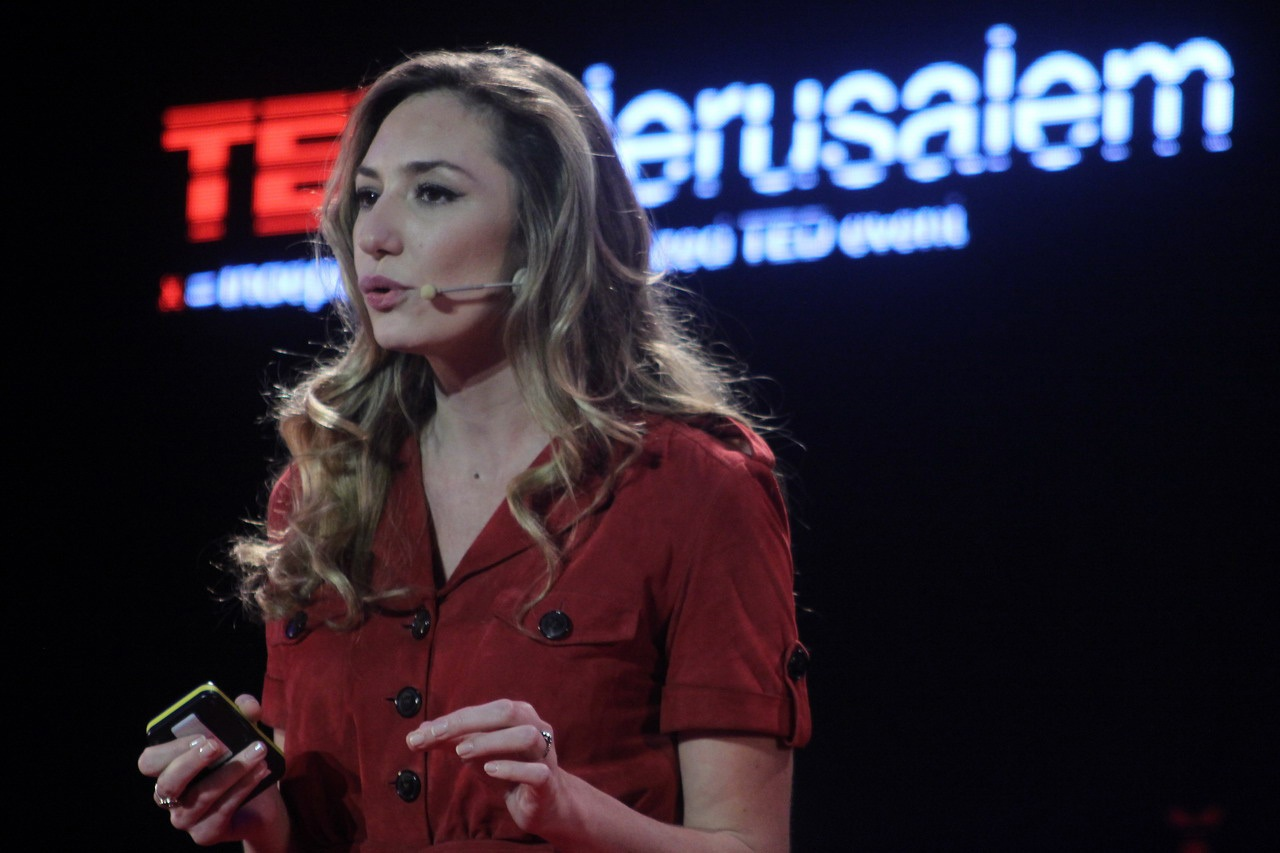
Ansky lectures at TED conference, Jerusalem

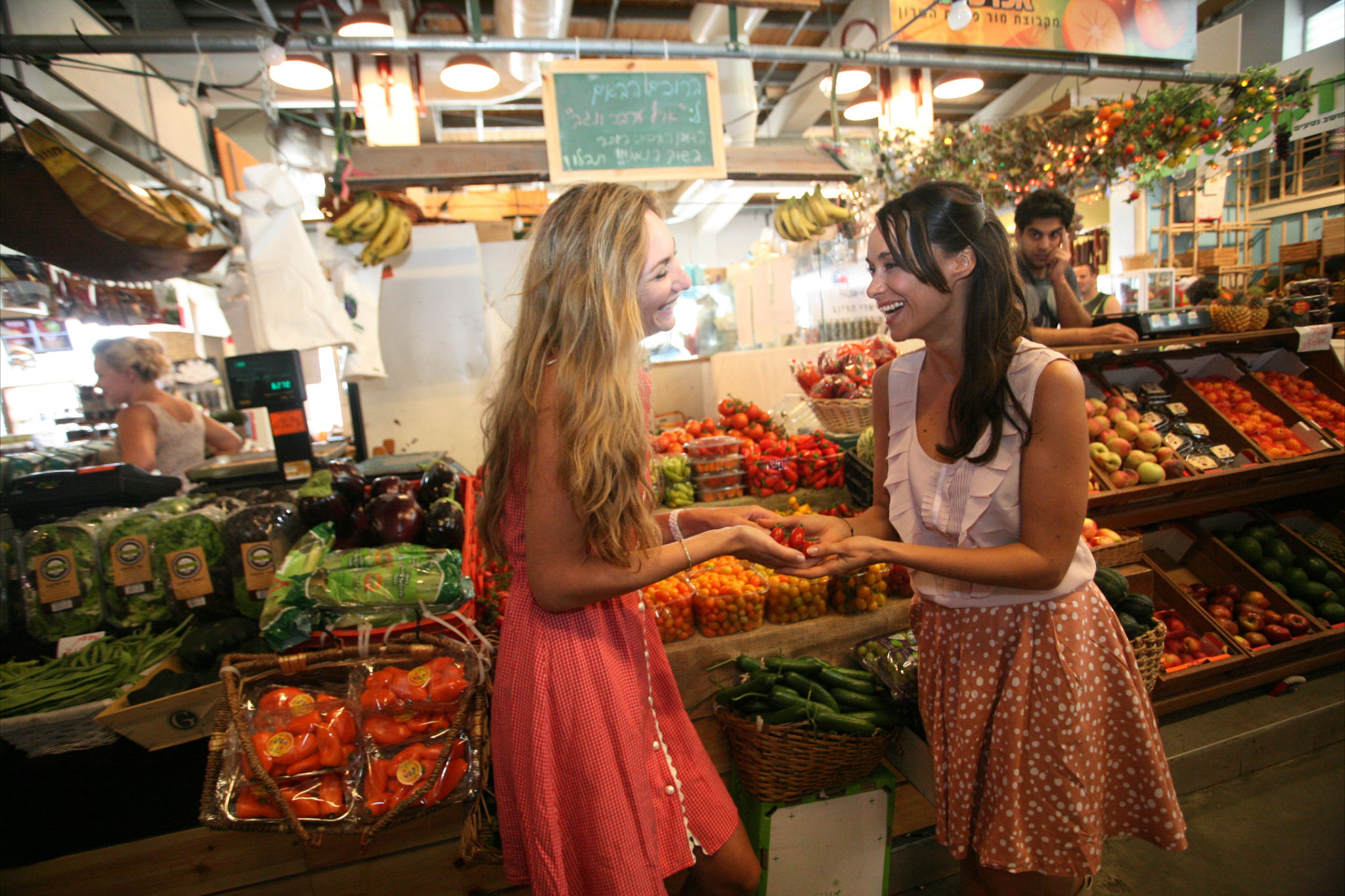
Michal Ansky with Karine Lima at the Tel Aviv Port

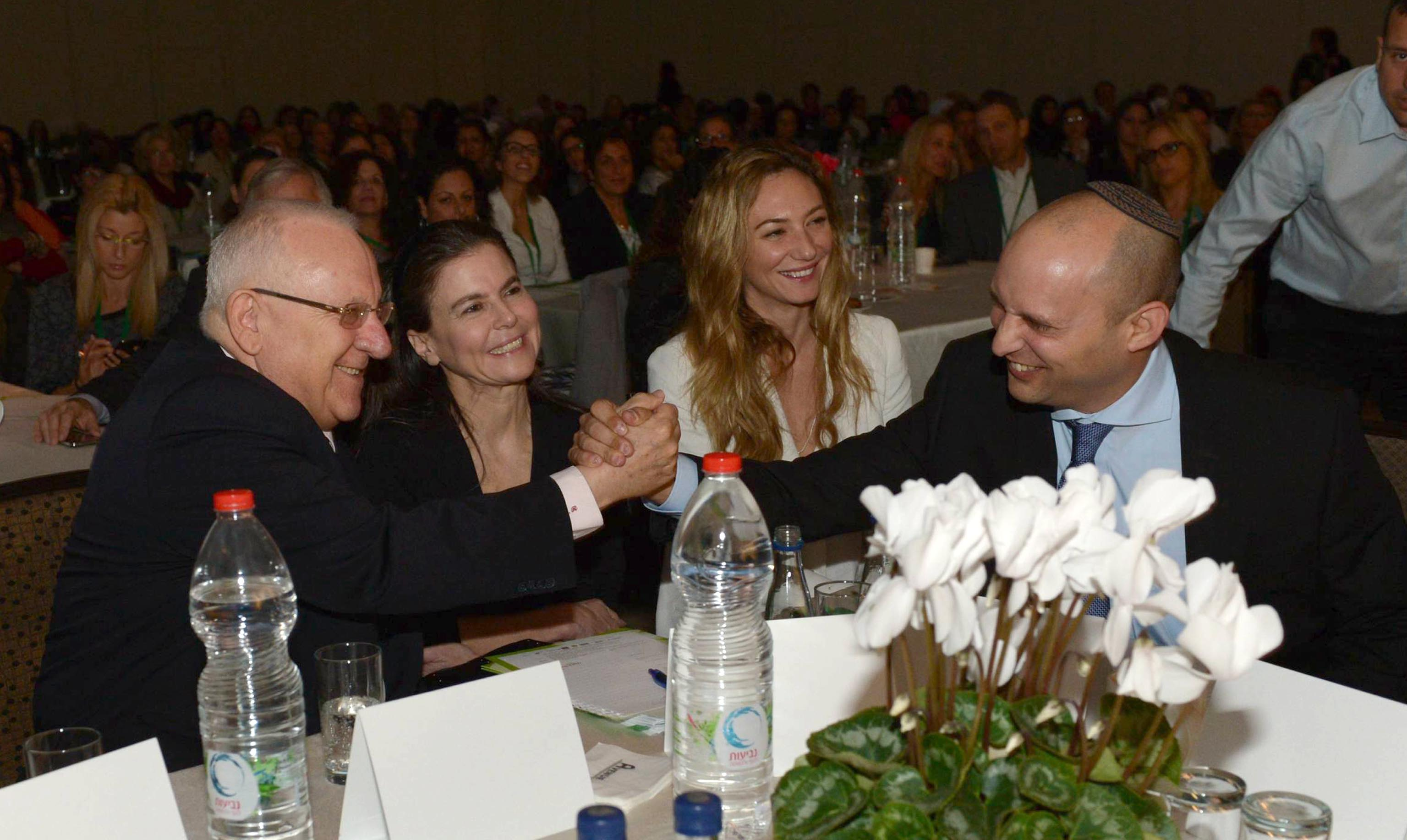
Ansky with President of Israel Reuven Rivlin, Ofra Strauss and Naftali Bennett at the Jasmine businesswomen's convention for promotion of small and medium-sized enterprises, Israel, 15 December 2014

== See also ==
- Israeli cuisine
- Women of Israel
