= Amir Bramly =

Israeli investor and businessman

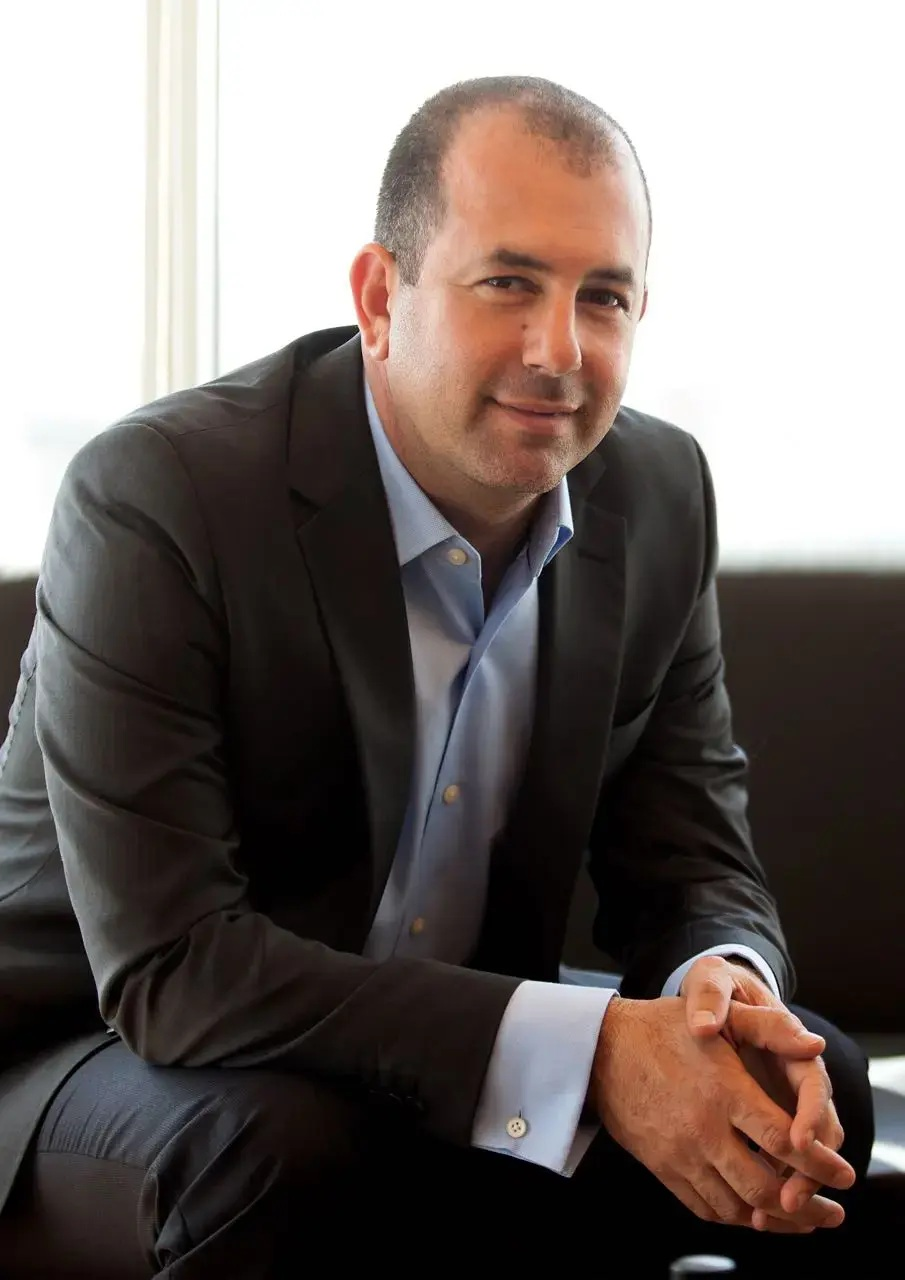
- Born: 4 October 1976 (age 50); Acre, Israel
- Education: University of Hartford
- Occupation: Ponzi scheme operator. Investor. Asset Manager.
- Known for: Founding and managing Rubicon business group (in dissolution) and Kela fund (in dissolution), former partner in Hagshama fund.
- Spouse: Daniella Bramly (m. 2000)

Amir Bramly (Hebrew: אמיר ברמלי, alternative English: Amir Bramli) (born 4 October 1976) is an Israeli investor and businessman convicted of money laundering and fraud. He is the founder and former manager of Rubicon Business Group (in dissolution) and "Kela Fund" (in dissolution), and former partner in Hagshama fund. At the height of his career, Bramly controlled dozens of companies, and received intense media coverage both of his own dealings and as an interviewed expert.

Amidst allegations of his businesses being a ponzi scheme Bramly's business empire was placed in permanent liquidation in January 2016, and a court order prohibiting disposition of assets was placed on Bramly and members of his family.

In October 2020, Bramly was convicted of money laundering, massive fraud, theft and other offenses.

In February 2021, he was sentenced to 10 years in prison.

== Early life and first business dealings ==
Bramly grew up in Acre. His mother was a kindergarten teacher and his father a computer technician who after leaving Rafael Advanced Defense Systems, attempted to open an independent business, failed, and experienced financial hardship. Bramly claims that this early hardship provided much of his drive to enter the business world.

At the age of 16, Bramly opened his first business – a reptile workshop for schools. According to Bramly initially the workshop was not a success, but after he offered a lecture titled "Snake Safety Precautions in the Summer", every school to which he offered the workshop took him up. At the height of this business, Bramly employed 5 full-time instructors, one of whom drove Bramly around as he didn't have a driver's license, and earned more money from the business than his father and mother combined.

At the age of 18 Bramly closed the reptile instruction business in order to volunteer for a year in a Society for the Protection of Nature in Israel wilderness school, after which he enlisted in the Israeli Intelligence Corps.

Following his discharge from the IDF, Bramly set up a scuba diving instruction business in Eilat. According to Bramly he raised the 40,000 NIS initial capital required for the business by telling a different story to three different banks. He sold this business in 2000 for 1,000,000 NIS.

After this he met his future wife, and traveled around the world, settling for a time in a private island in Belize in which he managed a resort. Concurrently, he studied via correspondence business administration at University of Hartford. He returned to Israel with his wife when they were expecting their first child, settling in a farm in Ramot Naftali and opening a consulting business for small and medium-sized businesses.

At some later date he moved to Zikhron Ya'akov.

2006 was a very difficult year for him. On a personal level his father died, and on the business front the 2006 Lebanon War nearly wiped him out financially, as most of his businesses were in the north of country and were affected by the war. Bramly has said, however, that through hard work and perseverance he was able to bounce back.

== Business career 2007–2013 ==
=== Rubicon Business Group ===
Rubicon Business Group was a personal holding company, owned wholly (100%) by Bramly, which Bramly managed actively. Most of Bramly's investments during this time period were performed via Rubicon. Rubicon invested in dozens of different companies. Some of these investments were a great success, for instance:

- Ezbob: Rubicon was one of the initial investors in 2011, and Amir Bramly served as Director of Global Risk in the company.
- Wobi: An online insurance comparison site. Rubicon purchased 50% of the site in December 2012 for at a company valuation of 8-10 million NIS, subsequently increased its holdings to 75% and exited the investment in May 2015 at a company valuation of 280 Million NIS.
- "Silver": A consumer credit business, which provides payment splitting at the Israeli postal bank.

However other investments such as a furniture business, restaurants, a hot air balloon, and the trash recycling public company WTP which started out with lofty ambitions and in 2014 had a peak traded value of 230 million NIS, but subsequently collapsed were not as successful.

Many of Rubicon's investments were in highly visible consumer facing companies. Some businesses, such as an investment with Ram Samuel's, a retired international racing car driver, Advanced driving school, or a string of joint culinary businesses with Michal Ansky involved local Israeli celebrities. The celebrity links, the willingness to interview both on matters related to his business and as a general business expert, speeches and panel appearances in economic conventions, a stream of press releases, and paid promotional content in Israeli financial sites led to a highly visible media presence that publicized Bramly's personal successes.

=== Kela Fund ===
Kela Fund was a marketing brand via which a number of private companies, all wholly owned by Rubicon, containing "Kela Fund" in their name, and managed by Amir Bramly, raised capital via internet and face to face marketing. Kela Fund offered investors 7.8% to 12% fixed interest rates, paid monthly, on an investment horizon of one to two years, after which the investor would be able to withdraw his principal after 90 days notice. Kela's use of these funds was presented to prospective investors as a very low-risk "Capital Completion" funding strategy in which funds were supposedly provided to businesses for 72 hours, backed with collateral, in order to secure loan financing from banks based on the capital.

Kela raised capital mostly from retail investors with 100,000 NIS and up available for investment. Some of these investors invested all their life savings with Kela. There were however some people of note who invested in the fund such as the lawyer Lipa Meir, Danny Ayalon, and culinary celebrity Michal Ansky who invested more than one million NIS with Bramly in addition to their joint business dealings.

Most of the funds were raised from Israeli investors, however there were also some fund raising attempts in the United States via Kela Fund USA from October 2013 onward.

=== Hagshama Fund ===
Hagshama Fund is a private company that organizes investment partnerships, typically with up to 35 investors per partnership. Bramly was a partner in Hagashama since its foundation in 2009 and until he sold his share at the end of 2013, when at that point Hagshama managed 1.5 Billion NIS. Bramly actively marketed Hagshama during this time.

Whereas Kela was presented to potential investors as a very low risk investment for 1–2 years, Hagshama investments were portrayed as somewhat riskier Mezzanine capital investments in mostly Real Estate with an expected return of 20% per annum and an investment horizon of 2 to 5 years. Thus, Hagshama was in a sense a complementary investment offering to Kela.

During Bramly's involvement with Hagshama, Hagashama was portrayed by Bramly as Rubicon's real investment arm. Lavish gala evenings for investors were held jointly for both Kela and Hagashma, in which Bramly and others delivered speeches.

== Business career 2014–2017 ==
During 2013–2016, Amir Bramly sharply criticized in a public manner the Israel Securities Authority and other government and regulatory bodies, claiming that over-regulation and poor management are holding back small businesses and the Israeli economy.

In 2014, the Israel Securities Authority limited the ability of private companies to circumvent prospectus requirements by artificially creating different investment paths to raise capital from more than 35 investors per year by utilizing an existing prospectus waiver for less than 35 investors per annum for each separate investment path offering. This directly affected Bramly's activity via Kela which at that time was raising funds from more than 35 investors per year by utilizing the 35 investor waiver on different investment paths. Subsequently, Bramly attempted to turn Kela into a public company via purchasing a publicly traded shelf corporation and raising capital publicly by issuing a prospectus. However ISA's subsequent actions prevented the shelf corporation from issuing a prospectus to investors beyond the draft stage, thus preventing the corporation from raising capital in a regulated fashion from non-Accredited investors, and in October 2015, in light of developing circumstances, Bramly sold the shelf corporation to a different entrepreneur. While attempting to go public, Bramly continued in 2015 to raise funds from investors without a prospectus via the Kela brand, though some changes were made to both the legal entity framework and in investment offerings to some potential investors which included in 2015 project specific collateral as opposed to the general "Capital Completion" strategy of years prior.

In the beginning of 2015, the Israel Securities Authority launched an investigation into Kela and issued a series of highly public warnings to the general public regarding the Kela Fund and Amir Bramly personally. Bramly did not back down in light of this pressure, and fought back, including by making stern public statements against ISA, and in September holding a press conference in which he stated that "ISA and the public don't understand the new economy, it's like claiming a digital clock is not a clock since it doesn't have hands." and that "ISA's actions against him belong in dark anti-democratic countries".

Bramly during this period increased his marketing efforts including by launching his first prime-time TV campaign which ridiculed the low interest rate environment and presenting the Kela Fund as an alternative to commercial bank deposits yielding approximately 0.5% at the time in which a portrayed investor goes all the way the banking chain to former Bank of Israel governor Stanley Fischer (portrayed by Moni Moshonov) asking "why 0.5%?", which was featured in valuable prime-time TV including buying the "Golden Break" prior to winner announcements in The X Factor Israel and MasterChef Israel. Following a public backlash, the ad campaign was barred for broadcast by The Second Authority for Television and Radio.

In light of public warnings, Bramly was facing increasing capital outflows in Kela brand companies of not only regular interest payments but of investors that exercised their right to withdraw funds at the end of their investment period instead of rolling them over into a new investment period. In the summer of 2015 Kela fund's payments to investors, which up until that point were performed regularly, became irregular, and investors did not receive their funds in a prompt manner. In October 2015, liquidation proceedings began against Kela. During the proceedings, more than 300 million NIS of unfulfilled debt, mostly from investors, were set before the court. In addition, the court appointed liquidator produced a report claiming that funds in the Kela fund were not actually used for "Capital completion", but rather funneled into Rubicon Business Group, and that in addition that funds were moved from Rubicon to Bramly and his family, due to which a court order prohibiting disposition of assets was placed on Bramly and members of his family. As a result, the Kela fund, Rubicon Business Group, and a number of held companies were placed in permanent liquidation by the Tel-Aviv district court in January 2016 after the court determined that funds were inter-meshed between the companies, and that debts, mainly to investors, exceeded assets.

After the beginning of civil court case, Bramly has claimed that the liquidity crises at Kela was caused by overzealous media coverage, repeated warnings by the Israel Securities Authority, and malfeasance by Bank Hapoalim. Bramly has claimed that without these there wouldn't have been any liquidity crises, and that these organizations are responsible for hundreds of millions of shekels in damage to investors. In response to allegations he has operated a ponzi scheme or pyramid scheme Bramly has stated to the press that "That the group is not any geometric shape that has been attributed to it.". In 2016 he has attempted, unsuccessfully in light of opposition by the court appointed liquidator and the court, to reach a debt settlement with the creditors, mainly investors, of Rubicon-Kela by offering shares in a new investment company and has employed former district court liquidation judge Varda Alsech to promote the matter. Audaciously, he has also placed his own debt claim, of 47.2 million NIS, against Rubicon and Kela due to backpay for his employment in the companies and reimbursement due to capital transfers to the companies and affiliated companies.

After a news item in Calcalist linked him to money transfers involving Bar Refaeli based on leaked Credit Suisse internal money laundering compliance correspondence, Bramly strongly denied the claims in the article and claimed that the court appointed liquidator leaked misleading correspondence that was for his eyes only, Rafaeli lodged a police complaint for identity theft against whoever passed the allegedly false information to the reporter, as a result of which the court appointed liquidator was summoned to the police and Bramly was summoned as a witness to Refeali's ongoing tax probe. Bramly subsequently personally sued the reporter, Tomer Ganon, for 1 million NIS damages for alleged libel.

In addition, Bramly sued Channel 2 News and its reporters and managers for 5 million NIS in damages, for alleged libel in an in-depth TV news item and interview with the court appointed liquidator. Bramly has threatened to sue additional individuals and organizations such as ISA and the court appointed liquidator for libelous slander. The sued individuals and bodies have claimed that these are Strategic lawsuit against public participation actions.

As of February 2017, there is an unresolved criminal trial proceeding against Bramly.
