= Assaf Granit =

Israeli chef and restaurant owner (born 1978)

Assaf Granit אסף גרניט
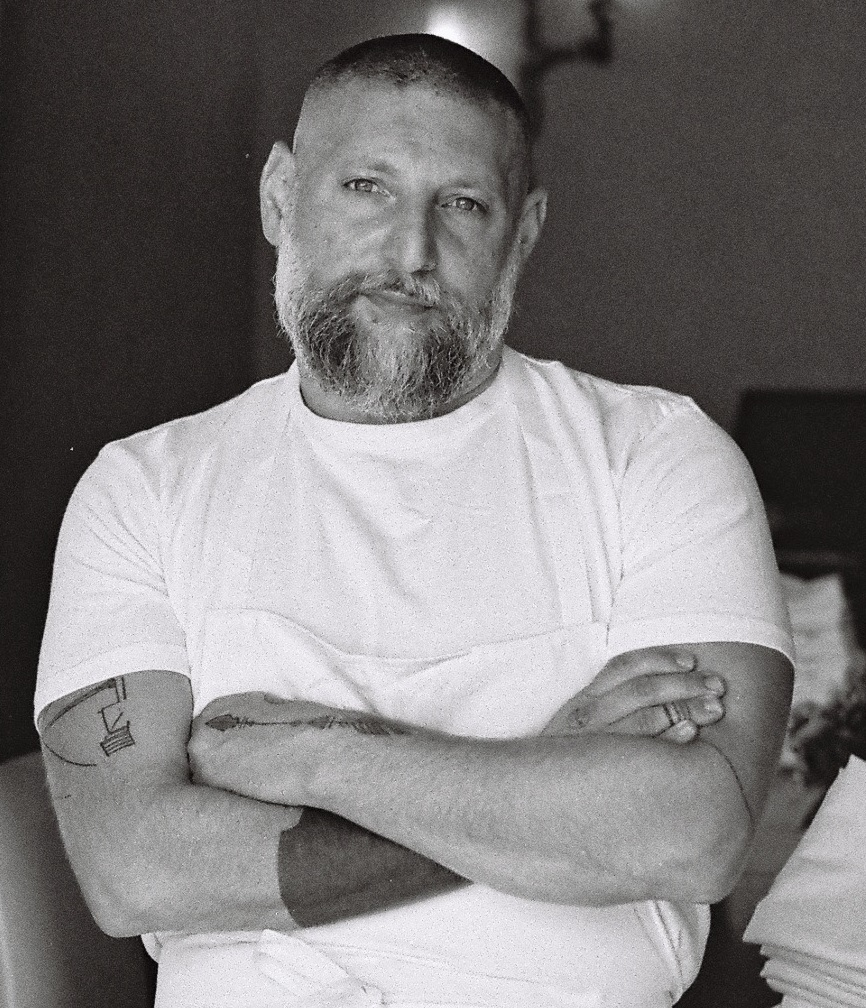
- Born: August 20, 1978 (age 47)
- Culinary career
- Current restaurants: Jerusalem; Machne Yehuda; The Workshop (HaSadna); Gigi Kovela; Loota; Yudaleh; Tzemach; DKL; Agrippus; Lid Ha; Tiberias; Loota; Tel Aviv; Beit HaSmachot; London; Palomar; Berberè; Coal Office; Paris; Le Balagan; Shabour; Baba; Tekes; Berlin; Berta; St. Barts; Sela

Assaf Elkanna Granit (Hebrew: אסף גרניט; born 20 August 1978) is an Israeli chef and owner of the Parisian restaurant Shabour. In January 2021, Granit was awarded a Michelin star for his Shabour restaurant. It is the first Michelin star awarded to an Israeli restaurant in France.

== Biography ==
Granit was born in the Rasco neighborhood of Jerusalem. His parents were native-born Israelis of Polish Jewish descent who Hebraized their surname "Guterman". He grew up in the Nayot neighborhood and attended the Denmark High School in his hometown, where he earned the nickname "Buffalo" which sticks with him to this day.

Granit initially served in the army as a combat soldier in the paratroopers brigade. After sustaining an injury during training, he was reassigned to serve as a medic instructor.

== Career ==
=== Shabour ===
He opened the restaurant in September 2019. In October 2019, Forbes named it one of the trendiest new restaurants in Paris. In November, Granit won a major award from the French culinary magazine Le Fooding. In December 2019, the restaurant was named the best restaurant in the French capital by Le Figaroscope, published by the French daily Le Figaro. In January 2021, Shabour received a Michelin star and Serena Williams, among other celebrities, enjoyed a meal there.

=== Other restaurants ===
Granit owns and operates other restaurants including Balagan (Paris, opened 2017), the Palomar (London), Sella (Saint Barthelemy, opened 2022) and Machneyuda (Israel, opened 2009). He owns other restaurants with business partner Uri Navon as well. Granit was born and trained in Jerusalem.

=== Other projects ===
In November 2020, Granit won the tender to open six restaurants to feed approximately 3000 employees at the Wix campus in Tel Aviv. The campus is set to open in 2022 and Granit's team won the tender to provide all of their meals.

== Television ==
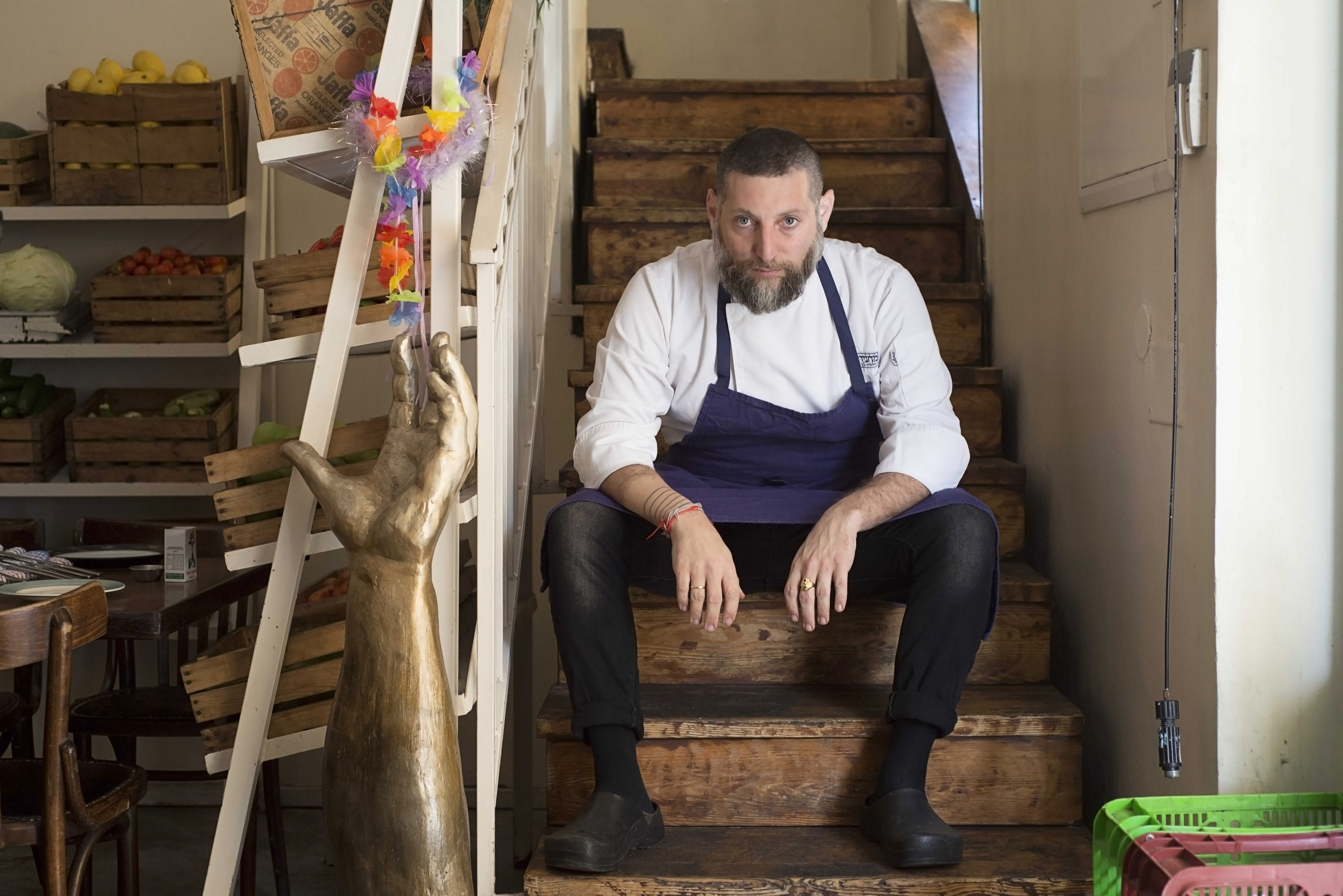
Granit. 2015

In 2008, Granit was eliminated during the second season of the show Knife Fight on Channel 10, and represented Israel in the American version of the show.

Since January 2014, Granit has served as a judge on the cooking reality show Game of Chefs (Mischakei HaChef) on Channel 13.

Since 2015, Granit has hosted the docu-reality show Revolution in the Kitchen on Channel 2, which is the Israeli version of the British show Kitchen Nightmares hosted by chef Gordon Ramsay.

In March 2017, the show Chef Games: Food on Wheels premiered, in which Granit participated along with chefs Meir Adoni and Moshik Roth.

In 2021 he starred in the second season of the series Being Filmed which airs on Hot 3.

On January 24, 2022, he began serving as a judge on the reality show The Next Restaurant on Channel 13, alongside chefs Moshik Roth, Yossi Shitrit and Ruthie Russo. He guest starred in the second season of the series Home Alone.

In 2022, he was a judge on the first Israeli season of The Next Restaurant.

== Honors ==
In 2026 Granit was honored as one of the 14 torchbearers in the national Israeli Independence Day ceremony.
