= The Next Restaurant =

Israeli reality television show

- Hebrew: המסעדה הבאה
- Judges: Moshik Roth; Assaf Granit; Yonatan Roshfeld
- No. of seasons: 1

Production
- Running time: 105 minutes

Original release
- Network: Reshet
- Release: January 24 – April 12, 2022

The Next Restaurant (Hebrew: המסעדה הבאה) is a reality television show originating from Israel's channel 13, and created by Ami Glam and Yuval Cohen, whose rights has been acquired by Freemantle. The format features ten weekly competitions between four contestants, in which the winner then runs a pop-up restaurant for a week with real diners from the public. The pop-up restaurants are scored by the show's judges, restaurant critics, diners, and the investors who will back the resulting winner of the show. During the "live portion" of the show, restaurants are eliminated based on these scores and two restaurants are chosen for the finale showdown. The winner of the show becomes the chef of the restaurant that is then opened to the public on a regular basis. During its first season in Israel, the show was channel 13's most viewed show in a period of three years.

== Israel: season 1 ==
The season featured Rotem Israel as presenter. Culinary professionals Assaf Granit, Moshik Roth, Yossi Shitrit, Ruthie Rousso were the judges of the show. Yonatan Roshfeld, who is also connected to the show as it is filmed in the location of his previous flagship Herbert Samuel restaurant, filled the role of the food critic.

The first season in Israel was won by Idan Bashuri (“Pompeii”), and opened the "Mileage" restaurant. The show finale was a disappointment in ratings and television criticism, who criticized the fact that the contestants were not physically in the same space and that the filming time of the finale segments was unclear. The winner's restaurant is promised to be open for a year.
