= MasterChef Israel =

Israeli reality cooking competition show

- Genre: Cooking
- Presented by: Haim Cohen; Eyal Shani; Michal Ansky; Rafi Adar; Yonatan Roshfeld; Yisrael Aharoni; Ruti Broudo
- Country of origin: Israel
- Original language: Hebrew
- No. of series: 11 regular seasons (also had Junior seasons and VIP seasons)
- No. of episodes: 167

Production
- Running time: 90–120 minutes
- Production companies: Gil Productions; Fremantle Media (2010-2014); Endemol Shine Group (2015-2019); Banijay Group (2021-present)

Original release
- Network: Channel 2 (Keshet) (seasons 1–6); Keshet 12 (season 7 – present)
- Release: 14 October 2010 – present

MasterChef Israel (Hebrew: מאסטר שף) is an Israeli reality cooking competition show that debuted on 14 October 2010 by Keshet on Channel 2 (from 2017 Keshet 12). It is based on the global MasterChef competitive cooking show television format. The show was very well received and highly acclaimed, achieving excellent reviews and high ratings.

== Format ==
The premise of the show is a cooking competition between amateur cooks, competing for the title of "MasterChef" and a kitchen renovation. The first few episodes of every series are audition episodes where contestants cook to a panel of judges who decide based on a dish cooked in front of them whether or not to pass the contestant to the next level, where a large number of the contestants chosen in the auditions are eliminated through a series of tests, until 12–14 are chosen as the show's final cast, and the members of the season's "Nivheret" (Selected Team).

The members of the "Nivheret" compete in different challenges every episodes, such as the mystery Box Challenge, the Invention Test, Dish Recreation Challenges and Taste Challenges.

=== Mystery Box Challenge ===
In the Mystery Box Challenge contestants receive a number of ingredients of which they are to make a dish of their choice. The contestants are allowed to use any number of the ingredients they are given as they wish, and are free to leave out any ingredients.

=== The Invention Test ===
The Invention Test requires of the contestants to make a dish, usually with a certain requirement, such as that the dish should cost no more than a certain price, the dish should contain a certain ingredient or be an adaption of other dishes. The Invention Test is usually the challenge that leads to eliminations.

=== Dish Recreation Test ===
In the Dish Recreation Test contestants are asked to recreate a complex dish made by a guest chef, usually with a recipe at hand.

=== Taste Challenges ===
In Taste Challenges the contestants are given a dish to taste, and are asked to name ingredients in the dish, for every ingredient they name correctly they score a point, until their first mistake. The contestant with the lowest score is usually eliminated.

== Judges ==
The first season judges were Haim Cohen, Eyal Shani, Michal Ansky, and Rafi Adar, all successful restaurateurs in Israel.

After the first season was concluded, Eyal Shani became famous, due to his eccentric treatment of food as poetry in the show, though Haim Cohen was the most famous of the judges, Shani became the symbol of the show and became a cultural icon in Israel.

In the second season, Haim Cohen, Eyal Shani and Michal Ansky continued as judges with Yonatan Roshfeld, chef of the Herbert Samuel restaurant, brought in to replace Rafi Adar.

In the seventh season, Haim Cohen, Eyal Shani and Michal Ansky continued as judges with Israel Aharoni, a famous Israeli chef, brought in to replace Yonatan Roshfeld.

In the tenth season, Ruti Broudo was added as a fifth judge alongside the existing panel of judges in which Ansky continued while being pregnant during filimg.

In the eleventh season, Michal Ansky quit the show and thus the number of judges returned back to 4.

== Season 1 (2010) ==
First aired on 14 October 2010, the first season of MasterChef received very high ratings and resulted in a large cook book that held all of the recipes shown on the first season.

=== Contestants ===
Contestant	Place Finished
Ina Kravetsky	Winner
Elkana Bitton	2nd
Smadar (Smadi) Vaknin	3rd
Aviva Fibko	4th
Itzik Harel	5th
Musa Abu Sris	6th
Ran Vasiliver	7th
Morria Ka'atavi	8th
Adi Mizrahi	9th
Gal Leibowitz	10th
Galit Bonfeld	11th
Aviv Ezer Fischler	12th

== Season 2 (2011) ==
The show was picked up for a second season in November 2010, a month after the first season first aired. the show began airing in June 2011, with the new judge, Yonatan Roshfeld.

=== Contestants ===
Contestant	Place Finished
Avi Levy	Winner
Elihav Sasson	2nd
Emmanuel Rosenzweig	3rd
Shai Sarmani	4th
Gili Halfteck	5th
Iris Kaspi	6th
Yossi Azulay	7th
Sima Ifargen	8th
Elisa Hammer	9th
Ilan Weissbrod	10th
Zohar Arnon	11th
Jennifer Sunny	12th
Moshe Sassoon	13th
Rachel Kadosh Mashan	14th

== Junior MasterChef (2012) ==
- Junior MasterChef Israel premiered on 20 April 2012 the judges will be the same as MasterChef Israel.

=== Contestants ===
Contestant	Place Finished
Daniel Tirosh	Winner
Dana Sharon	2nd
Stav Choen	3rd
Radi Halvi	4th
Shaked Snerch	5th
Roy Vresano	6th
Rean Vice	7th
Amit Shabu	8th
Oded Ovadia	9th
Sivan Klika	10th
Nil Shatraunber	11th
Lihi Naim	12th
Yarden Hamo	13th
Dana Kozinitzki	14th
Itay Choen	15th
Avia Dozali	16th

== Season 3 (2012–13) ==
=== Contestants ===
Contestant	Place Finished
Tom Franz	Winner
Salma Fyumi	2nd
Jackie Azulay	3rd
Paulin Shoval	4th
Dalia Alchadf	5th
Mia Ben Tzvi	6th
Eti Levi	7th
Beni Ben Israel	8th
Shai Brandas	9th
Shelly Harman	10th
Vicky Jan	11th
Itay Elimelech	12th
Elinor Rachamim	13th
Snir Nekar	14th

== Season 4 (2014) ==
=== Contestants ===
Contestant	Place Finished
Nof Ethamna Ismail	Winner
Ido Kronenberg	2nd
Masrat Woldmichael	3rd
Shlomo Ezran	4th
Ricky Soysa	5th
Tzila Ofer	6th
Serenada Dilvski	7th
Shai Tobol	8th
Eitan Slomon	9th
Asher Levi	10th
Josh Steel	11th
Lior Slomon	12th
Moran Sasa	13th
Lary Suesman	14th

== MasterChef VIP (2015) ==
=== Contestants ===
Contestant	Place Finished
Shai Avivi	Winner
Pnina Tornai	2nd
Aya Kramreman	3rd
Betty Rockawy	4th
Shlomo Scharf	5th
Norman Issa	6th
Eden Harel	7th
Avi Nosbaum	8th
Noam Tur	9th
Shlomi Eldar	10th
Dorit Rabinyan	11th
Eti Levi	12th

== Season 5 (2015) ==
=== Contestants ===
Contestant	Place Finished
Massimiliano De Matteo	Winner
Rachel Ben Elul	2nd
Lama Shchada	3rd
Michal Epstein	4th
Ron Soriano	5th
Iv Anan	6th
Eyal Geresh	7th
Racheli Kadosh	8th
Rut Ruzovski	9th
Misha Lederman	10th
Natali Finkelstein	11th
Ben Aviad	12th

== Season 6 (2016) ==
=== Contestants ===
Contestant	Place Finished
Tom Aviv	Winner
Yehonatan Biton	2nd
Sofi Porat	3rd
Shira Betzalel	4th
Liron Asulin	5th
Diana Rachmani	6th
Matan Chaliva	7th
Amit Haya Twito	8th
Eli Mitzri	9th
Yacky Algranti	10th
Gal Ofir	11th
Neria Cohen	12th

== Season 7 (2017–18) ==
=== Contestants ===
Contestant	Place Finished
Yehuda Amar	Winner
Amichai Shrapstein	2nd
Yehoyada Nizri	3rd
Edi Babaeib	4th
Victoria Goberman	5th
Bar Pines	6th
Muzna Bishara	7th
Sivan Amar	8th
Nadia Awid	9th
Bar Eilon	10th
Itzik Batashvili	11th
Liron Partosh	12th
Larisa Slapian Ashed	13th
Yochay Golan	14th

== Season 8 (2019) ==
=== Contestants ===
Contestant	Place Finished
Vanessa Vidal	Winner
Shahar Levi	2nd
Gal Kaspers	3rd
Lior Ohayon	4th
Farrah Raslan	5th
Yotam Aranovich	6th
Jana Khein	7th
Costa Osadchy	8th
Albert Ifraimov	9th
Nimrod Zioni	10th
Ruhama Hershdorfer	11th
Dana Elharar	12th
Adi Sivan	13th
Arnon Naim	14th
Tahel Kedem	15th
Sagi Keren	16th

==== VIP Special ====
Contestant	Place Finished
Itay Levi	Winner
Ofira Asayag	2nd
Eli Ildis	3rd
Itzik Cohen	4th
Tahounia Rubel	5th
Nesli Barda	6th
Eitan Cabel	7th
Dana Grotsky	8th

== Season 9 (2021) ==
=== Contestants ===
Contestant	Place Finished
Ithiela Hayat	Winner
Hofit Sarmili	2nd
Asaf Day	3rd
Adi Weinberg	4th
Guy Bimka	5th
Tair Mordoch	6th
Manal Ismail	7th
Haim Cohen	8th
Bat-Shai Oz	9th
Eti Morad	10th
Eden Gindi	11th
Meital Raichel	12th
Irakli Gonswili	13th
Shemi Afniar	14th
Avner Rosenthalis	15th

==== VIP Special 1 ====
Contestant	Place Finished
Kobi Oz	Winner
Albert Escola	Competitor
Hana Laszlo	Competitor
Lihi Lapid	Competitor
Moshe Peretz	Competitor
Ruslana Rodina	Competitor
Yifat Shasha-Biton	Competitor

==== VIP Special 2 ====
Contestant	Place Finished
Dudi Amsalem	Winner
Aki Avni	Competitor
Alex Hazanov	Competitor
Avraham Tal	Competitor
Einav Boublil	Competitor
Lea Snirer	Competitor
Shimon Bouskilla	Competitor

== Season 10 (2022) ==
Season 10 began on 15 June 2022, Ruti Broudo joined as a fifth judge.

During the season Eyal Shani was criticized after he discriminated against a contestant who lives in Bat Ayin based on his residence. Critics called for Shani's removal from the show.

=== Contestants ===
Contestant	Place Finished
Hillel Gardi	Winner
Yaniv Shahar	2nd
Michal Motil	3rd
Sivan Brick Hen	4th
Shani Ben Shimol	5th
Omer Shaysh	6th
Giselle Sarah Lellouche	7th
Gal Moran Yisraeli	8th
Elad Elzara	9th
David Cohen	10th
Sarah Malka	11th
Shoval Katony	12th
Mastawal Mogas	13th
Hamos Guetta	14th
Or Wangenheim	15th
Eden Yam Reuven	16th
Qmars Malkan	17th
Michal Lahav	18th
Inessa Binyamin	19th
Haim Rabinovich	20th

==== VIP Special ====
Contestant	Place Finished
Yarden Gerbi	Winner
Michal Amdursky	2nd
Didi Harari	3rd
Avi Kakon	Competitor
Dana Frider	Competitor
Stéphane Legar	Competitor
Tuvia Tzafir	Competitor

== Season 11 (2024) ==
Season 11 first aired on 2 March 2024. Michal Ansky left the show, leaving 4 judges.

=== Contestants ===
Contestant	Place Finished
Natalie Mizrahi Amaral	Winner
Astar Biton	2nd
Itay Dagan	3rd
Nissim Zelite	4th
Raya Erica Marian	5th
Miri Ezra	6th
Avishag Pe'er	7th
Bar Levy	8th
Arye Rozenshtock	9th
Amit Bazyler	10th
Pusha Chernov	11th
Lior Shnaidman	12th
Ziv Shapira	13th
Danit Sofer	14th
Ori Aharonovich	15th

== MasterChef All-Stars 1 (2024) ==
MasterChef All-Stars Israel 1 was first aired on 12 October 2024. Michal Ansky returned the show, with chefs Yuval Ben-Netia and Avi Biton added as new judges as well.

=== Contestants ===
Contestant	Original season	Place Finished
Michal Epstein	5	Winner
Amichai Shrapstein	7	2nd
Rachel Ben Elul	5	3rd
Hofit Sarmili	9	4th
Farrah Raslan	8	5th
Lior Ohayon	8	6th
Albert Ifraimov	8	7th
Yehoyada Nizri	7	8th
Smadar (Smadi) Vaknin	1	9th
Roy Vresano	Junior	10th
Eitan Slomon	4	11th

== Season 12 (2025) ==
Season 12 began on 25 August 2025.

=== Contestants ===
Contestant	Place Finished
Yuval Rozen	Winner
Hadas Bandel	2nd
Nitzan Aharon	3rd
Anat Agmon	4th
Zachi Masas	5th
Netanel Vilder Mecher	6th
Dorin Abdan	7th
Michelle Skorik	8th
Ruthi Gur	9th
Raziel Illouz	10th
Shalev Hazan	11th
Yaniv Persy	12th
Noga Ratz Vakrat	13th
Haim Sigawi	14th
Ron Shirazi	15th
Shira Eliyahu	16th

==== VIP Special ====
Contestant	Place Finished
Valerie Hamaty	Winner
Izhar Cohen	Competitor
Liron Zaid	Competitor
Lucy Ayoub	Competitor
Ofer Hayoun	Competitor
Sapir Avisror	Competitor
Shalmor Shtrozman	Competitor
Subliminal	Competitor

== MasterChef All-Stars 2 (2026) ==
MasterChef All-Stars Israel 2 will first air on 11 August 2026. Michal Ansky, along with chefs Yuval Ben-Neriah and Avi Biton returned the show after quitting in season 12. Eyal Shani is the only judge remaining from the previous season.

=== Contestants ===
Contestant	Original season	Place Finished
Elihav Sasson	2	Winner
Haim Cohen	9	2nd
Gal Kaspers	8	3rd
Manal Ismail	9	4th
Nissim Zelite	11	5th
Tair Mordoch	9	6th
Danit Sofer	11	7th
Jackie Azulay	3	8th
Bar Levy	11	9th
Eden Harel	VIP	10th
Aviva Fibko	1	11th
Costa Osadchy	8	12th

== See also ==
- Israeli television
- Israeli cuisine
