= &moshik =

Coordinates: 52°22′35.84″N 4°54′19.37″E

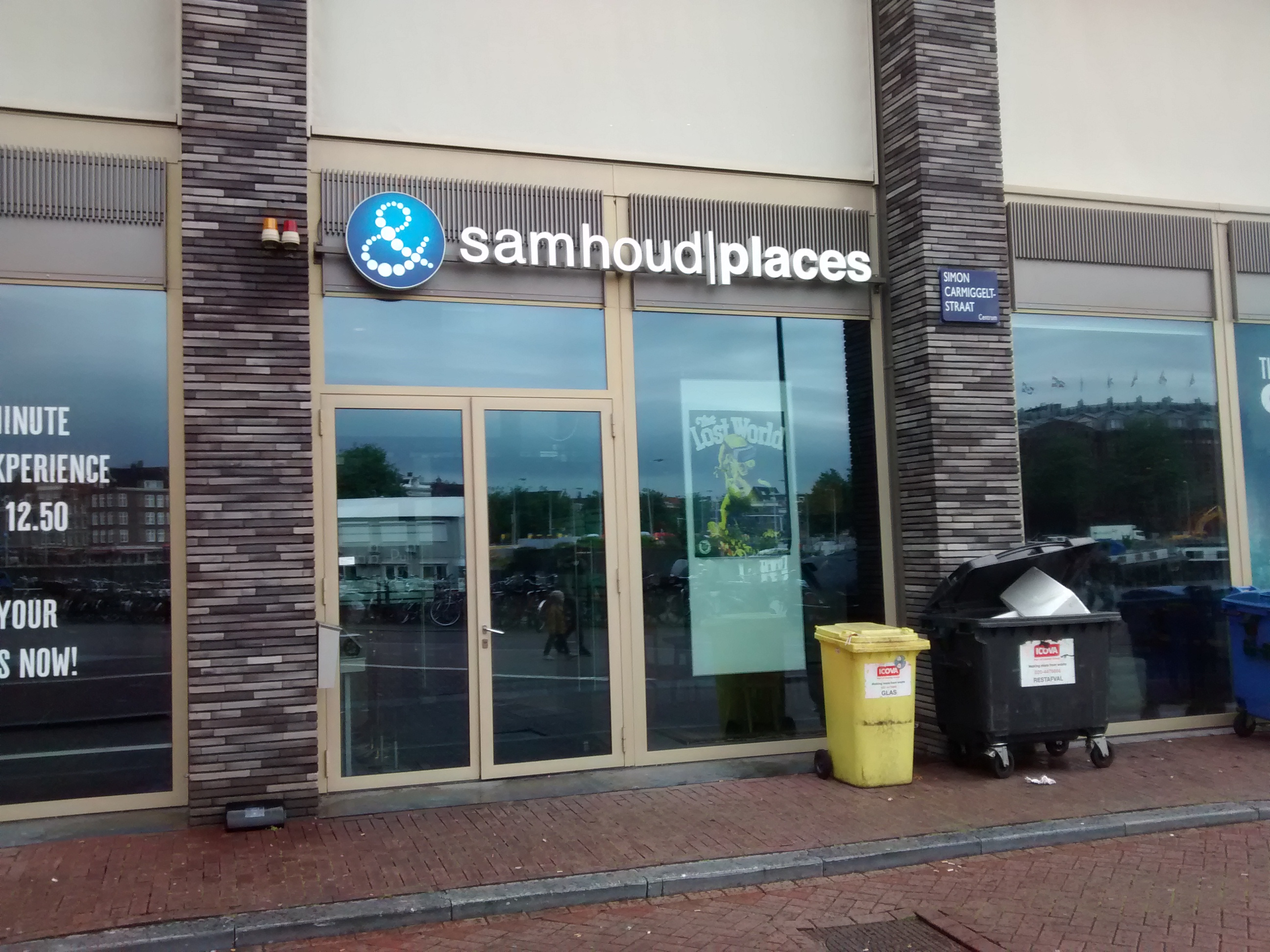
- Interactive map of &moshik

Restaurant information
- Established: 2012
- Closed: 2020
- Head chef: Moshik Roth
- Food type: French, International, Moleculair
- Rating: Michelin Guide
- Location: Oosterdokskade 5, Amsterdam, 1011 AD, Netherlands
- Seating capacity: 60
- Website: Official website

&moshik, formerly &samhoud places, was a fine-dining restaurant in Amsterdam, Netherlands. The restaurant was awarded two Michelin stars for 2013. However it owed this rating to the past performance of its head chef as the restaurant was opened too briefly for a thorough review. In November 2013, the restaurant was again awarded two stars, this time under their own power. It closed down in May 2020 when the COVID-19 pandemic crisis forced it into bankruptcy.

The head chef of &moshik was Moshik Roth, one of the leading molecular chefs in the Netherlands. The restaurant was the successor of 't Brouwerskolkje in Overveen.

&moshik was a cooperation between Israeli chef Moshik Roth and entrepreneur Salem Samhoud. They created an up scale restaurant on the so-called "Oosterdokseiland". In the new building, the restaurant comprised a lounge and restaurant over two floors. Mid January 2018 the restaurant changed name to &moshik to avoid confusion with other companies in the "&samhoud group".

== See also ==
- List of Michelin starred restaurants in the Netherlands
