= Alex Levac =

Israeli photojournalist and street photographer

- אלכס ליבק
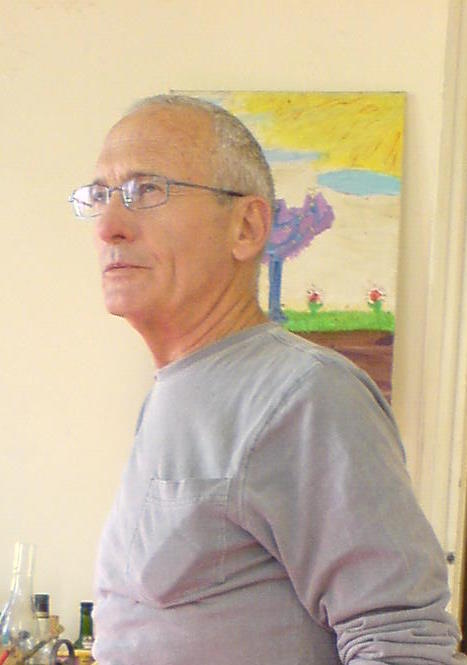
- Born: 23 June 1944 (age 82); Tel Aviv, Mandatory Palestine (now Israel)
- Awards: 2005 Israel Prize Winner

Alex Levac (Hebrew: אלכס ליבק; born 1944, Tel Aviv) is an Israeli photojournalist and street photographer. He was awarded the Israel Prize for photography in 2005.

== Youth and studies ==
Alex Levac was born in Tel Aviv in 1944. He graduated in philosophy and psychology from Tel Aviv University and in photography from the London College of Printing.

== Career ==
He began working as a freelance photographer in Brazil from 1971 to 1974. In 1974–79, he worked in London and later in Los Angeles (1979–81). In 1981, he returned to Israel and settled in Jerusalem. Levac is married to Maariv journalist Sherry Ansky and they have one child.

In 1983, he became staff photographer for the daily Hadashot and since 1993 he is staff photographer for the Israeli daily Haaretz. In 1984, a photograph he took during the hijacking of a Tel Aviv bus disproved the official account of events and led to a long running scandal known as the Kav 300 affair. Levac has participated in a number of exhibitions, among them Amazon Indians, held at the University of California, Berkeley; the Ein Harod Israeli Biennale of Photography; and the Israel Museum in Jerusalem. He published five books.

== Awards ==
- In 1993, Levac received the Rita Poretzky Award of Photography from the Tel Aviv Museum of Art.
- In 2001, the Israeli Foreign Ministry chose Levac to represent Israel in the international exhibit "Our Country".
- In 2005, he won the Israel Prize, for photography. The judges who chose to award the prize emphasized the humanitarian perspective of his work. "No other photographer is as involved as Alex Levac in the Israeli experience," they wrote.

== Quotes ==
"I don't take a lot of pictures. I see things as though through a sieve. The choice of a specific moment is mine. I enjoy photography. It forces me to look at marginal things as well. There are wonderful situations where the photographic potential is enormous, and pictures truly leap to the eye, but most pictures are obtained by hard and patient work. I would like all my pictures to be great, full of historical, social, and anthropological meaning, but very few reach that level. Many times the result is simply anecdotal, visual amusements, the justaposition of bits of reality that usually are not connected to one another. Some are complex, others are simple, but they always tell something about us."

== Published works ==
- Eye to Zion, edited by David Tartakover, published by Am Oved, 1994.
- Tel Aviv Serenade, with poems by Nathan Alterman, Hakibbutz Hameuchad, 2000.
- Our country, Introduction: Daniel Ben-Simon, published by the Ministry of Defense, 2000.
- Like a dog, edited by David Tartakover, Keter Publishing, 2005.
- Israel: the twenty-first century, Carmel Press, 2008.

== Exhibitions ==
- 2018: Oh Jerusalem, Gallery Bernd A. Lausberg, 16 February – 9 March 2018
- 2018: Lost in Translation, Haifa Museum, 4 August 2018 – 17 February 2019
- 2018: Israeli Street Moments, Leica Gallery Prague, 2 November 2018 – 6 January 2019

== See also ==
List of Israel Prize recipients
