= Moshik Roth =

Israeli celebrity chef (born 1972)

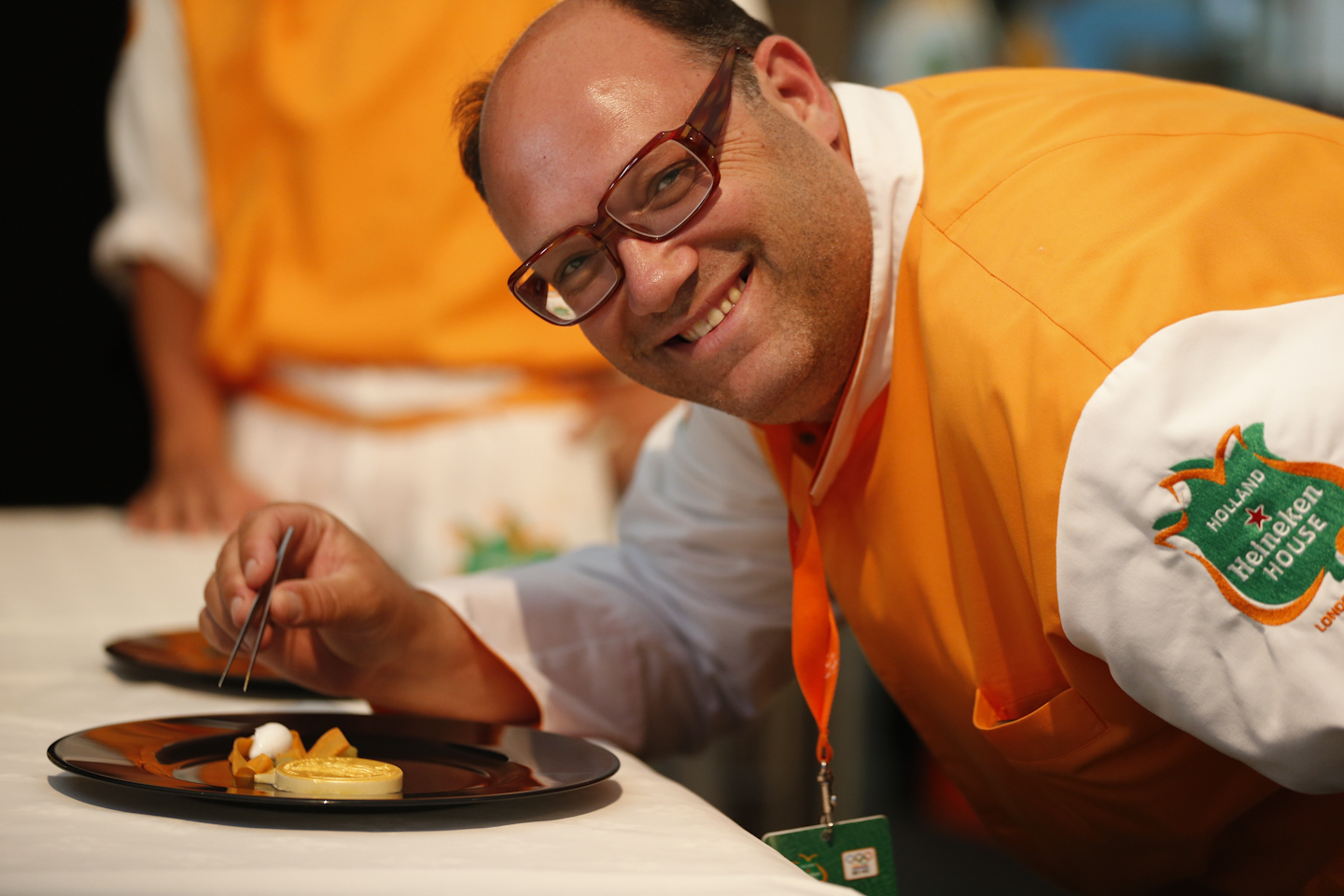
- Born: משה אהרון רוט; 12 December 1971 (age 54); Haifa, Israel
- Spouse: Shiran Roth
- Culinary career
- Cooking style: [Molecular gastronomy]]
- Current restaurant: T Brouwerskolkje
- Previous restaurant: &moshik
- Television show: MasterChef Israel

Moshe Aharon "Moshik" Roth (Hebrew: משה אהרון "מושיק" רוט; born 12 December 1971) is an Israeli celebrity chef. He was head chef of restaurant &Moshik in Amsterdam, Netherlands, which held two Michelin stars.

== Biography ==
Born in 1971 in Haifa, Israel; to a family of Ashkenazi Jewish descent, Russian-Jewish father and a Romanian-Jewish mother, Roth was raised in Eilat and afterwards in Yavne. After completing his military service in the IDF, he went to Eilat, intending to learn hotel management and met his future wife Els. When he was 23, Els went back to her homeland in the Netherlands and Roth followed her there. His first job was as pizzeria manager. After a while he studied in Jonnie Boer's restaurant - De Librije, from there he continued to apprentice in the Zwethheul restaurant, near Rotterdam and afterwards he opened his own restaurant 't Brouwerskolkje, where he was the chef, and his wife was the sommelier. The restaurant was located in a house which once was a pancake store.

't Brouwerskolkje restaurant got its first Michelin star in 2006 and the second in 2009. Roth closed the restaurant on April 14, 2012.

On August 15, 2012 he opened &samhoud places in Amsterdam together with entrepreneur Salem Samhoud. The restaurant received two Michelin stars in November 2012. He renamed this restaurant to &moshik in January 2018.

Roth used to go frequently to Alsace, to work together with chef Jean-Georges Klein, chef and owner of restaurant L'Arnsbourg in Alsace, France, and some of the dishes in both restaurants are similar. The preparation of the food combined classical and Molecular gastronomy techniques.

Roth participated as one of the three judges of the Israeli reality show Game of Chefs.

In 2022, he was a judge on the first Israeli season of The Next Restaurant.
