= Ruti Broudo =

Israeli celebrity chef

Ruti Broudo רותי ברודו
- Born: 28 August 1961 (age 64); Netanya, Israel
- Spouse: Mati Broudo
- Culinary career
- Television show(s): MasterChef Israel (Season 10) MKR: Winning Kitchen

Ruti Broudo (Hebrew: רותי ברודו; born 28 August 1961) is an Israeli celebrity chef.

== Career ==
She runs the R2M Restaurant Group and has founded culinary institutions such as Hotel Montefiore, Herzl 16, the Bakery chain, the Delicatessen chain, and the Brasserie. During the COVID-19 pandemic, she made public pleas on television and in newspapers to save the culinary industry in Israel. She also called on her followers to join protests. During the pandemic, she closed Brasserie. She has judged on the national television show MKR: Winning Kitchen.

In 2021, she joined MasterChef Israel as a judge for the 10th season. TV critics said she did not change the show much and that it remained mostly the same. The magazine At wrote that she is the only Israeli female chef to judge two separate cooking shows. Broudo said she started going to a psychologist because of MasterChef.

She was honoured by the Knight Club of Israel as a top chef of Israel.

== Personal life ==
Broudo was born in 1961 in Netanya. She is married to, but separated from, Mati Broudo who is her partner in the R2M group. She is in a long-term relationship with chef Guy Polak. She has no children, saying she wanted to concentrate on building her business. Her father, from Hungary, survived the Auschwitz concentration camp. Her mother, Yehudit Friedlander, was in a Nazi labor camp as a four year old and survived after she escaped with her family to the woods with partisans.
