= Sherry Ansky =

Israeli journalist (born 1957)

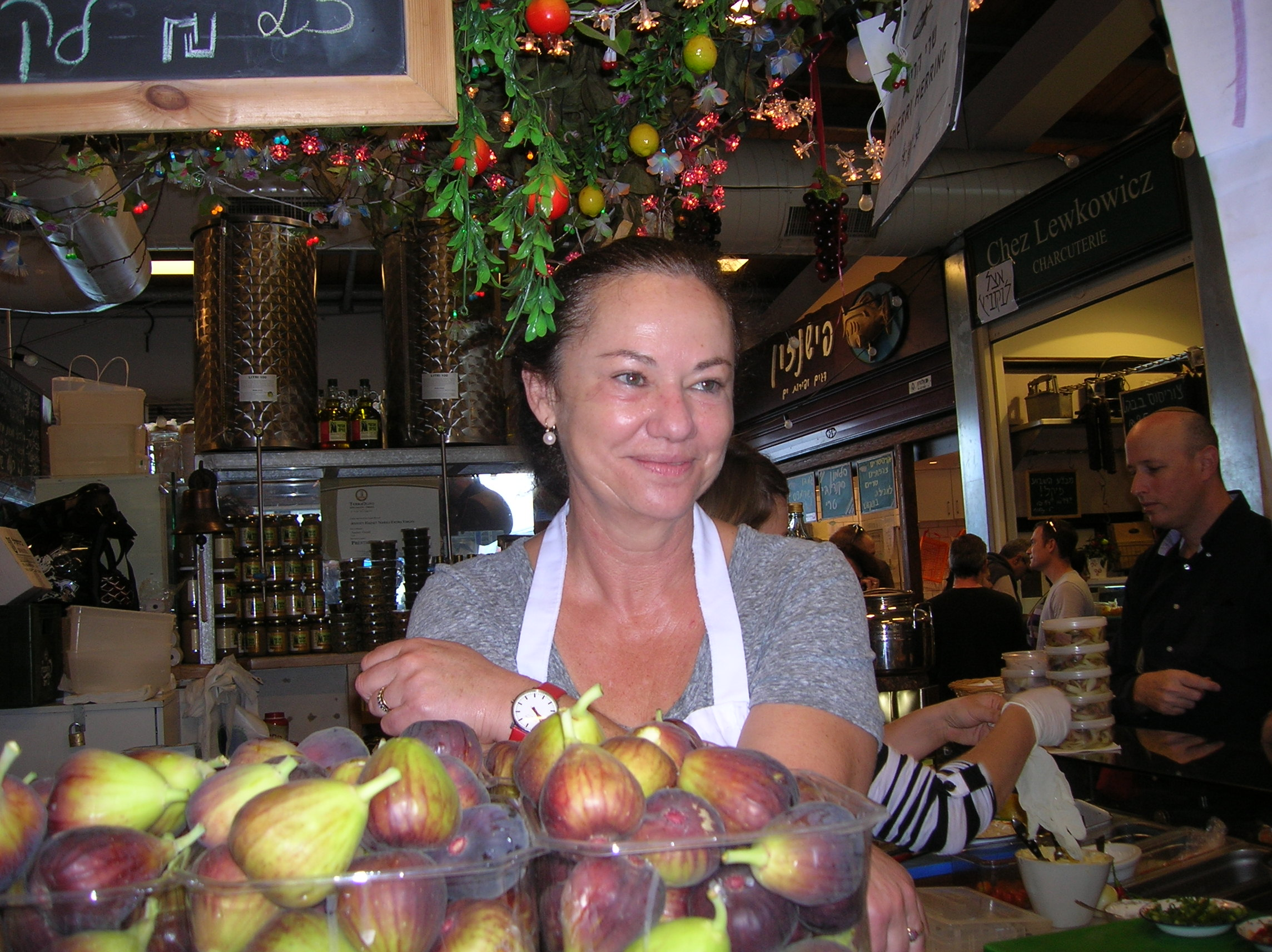
- Born: 1957 (age 68–69); Jerusalem, Israel
- Occupations: Journalist, Chef, Cookbook author

Sherry (Sarah) Ansky (born 1957 in Jerusalem) is an Israeli journalist, chef, and cookbook author.

== Biography ==
Sherry Ansky was born and raised in the Neve Sha'anan neighborhood of Jerusalem, in a traditional Jewish family of Czech origin. Her father was Bible scholar Prof. Haim Gavrihu (originally Haim Gottesman), and her mother, Hannah (Davidovitz), was an agriculture teacher who grew vegetables and fruits in her garden, nurturing Ansky's early curiosity about nature, markets, and different cuisines.

She studied in religious schools, including the "Bema'ale" school and the Evelina de Rothschild School for Girls. During the Yom Kippur War, she lost her brother, Reuven Gavrihu, to whom she later dedicated her book The Kitchen of Sherry Ansky.

After ten years working as a graphic designer for the newspaper Maariv, Ansky began writing a food column for the paper in 1992. Her writing often combines personal stories from her childhood and adolescence in Jerusalem. In mid-2011, she stopped writing for Maariv and opened a stand for salted herring sandwiches called "Sherry Herring" at the covered market in the Tel Aviv Port complex.

Ansky was married to actor and radio broadcaster Alex Ansky. They have two children: gastronomy expert and television personality Michal Ansky, and painter Hillel Ansky. After her divorce, she was the partner of photographer Alex Levac (who also photographed many of her recipes), and they have a son together, Haim Levac, a painter who lives and works in Leipzig, Germany. They separated in 2014.

She also had a brief relationship with poet Yehonatan Geffen.

== Books ==
- Eating in Jerusalem: Impressions, Recipes, Documents, Feasts (photography: Nelly Sheffer), Modan Publishing, Tel Aviv, 1992.
- The Kitchen of Sherry Ansky (photography: Nelly Sheffer), Modan, Tel Aviv, 1998.
- Vegetables, Maariv – Hed Artzi, Tel Aviv, 1993.
- Food (photography: Alex Levac), Keter, 2003.
- Chamin (photography: Alex Levac), Keter, Jerusalem, 2008.
- The Food Is Ready (photography: Alex Levac), Keter, 2021.
