= Michael Harsgor =

Israeli historian (1924–2011)

- מיכאל הרסגור
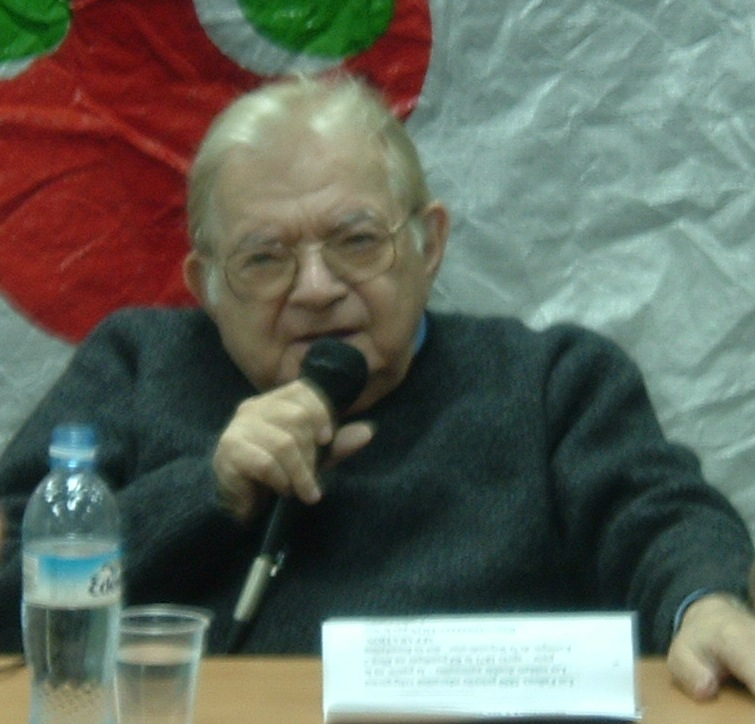
- Born: 15 March 1924; Bucharest, Romania
- Died: 10 February 2011 (aged 86); Kfar Saba, Israel
- Education: Tel Aviv University
- Occupation: Historian
- Known for: popular history broadcast on the radio

Michael Harsgor (Hebrew: מיכאל הרסגור; 15 March 1924 – 10 February 2011) was an Israeli historian and a professor of history at the Tel Aviv University. Harsgor's expertise was in the history of Europe in the late Middle Ages.

== Biography ==
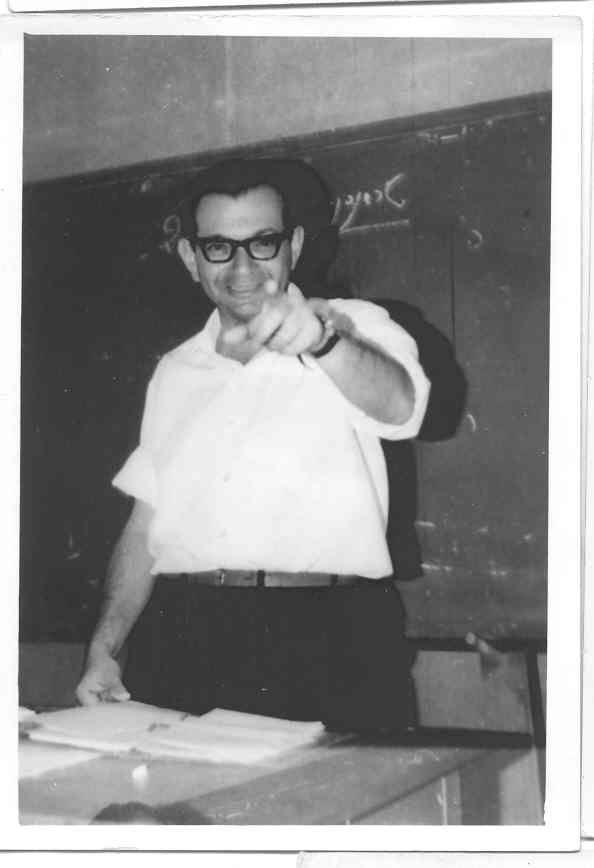
Michael Harsgor as a teacher in a highschool

Harsgor was born Michael Goldberg in Bucharest into a Jewish family who were refugees from the October Revolution in Russia who settled in Romania. Early on, Harsgor's parents had the desire to give him a Western education and therefore his family moved to France. The economic crisis of 1929 damaged his father's business and therefore in 1933 his family returned to Romania. Harsgor's family intended to immigrate to Mandatory Palestine, but this proved impossible during World War II. His entire family perished in the Holocaust. Because he was a member of the Socialist–Zionist youth movement Hashomer Hatzair the Romanian fascist authorities sentenced him to 20 years of imprisonment with hard labor. Harsgor ended up working in the printing press of the prison. In 1944 he was released from prison, and continued to be active in the Hashomer Hatzair youth movement.

In 1946, after being active in gathering Jewish teenagers in Romania and facilitating their immigration to Palestine, he himself immigrated to the then British ruled country. The British authorities limited the Jewish immigration quota at that time and all the passengers on the ship taking him to Palestine were seized and imprisoned in camps in Cyprus. They were released in early 1949, after the establishment of the State of Israel. In Cyprus Harsgor changed his name from Goldberg to Harsgor, sometimes spelled in the press as Har-Segor, Har Segor, Harsgur etc.

Harsgor was among the founding members of Kibbutz Zikim and was the person who gave the kibbutz its name. Harsgor was a member of Maki, the Israeli communist party at the time, and worked as a reporter for the party newspaper Kol HaAm. At that time he met his wife Tamar, and his daughter Niva was born.

Harsgor began his academic studies at the Tel Aviv University. He excelled in his Bachelor's degree and therefore the Tel Aviv University sent him to France to continue his studies. Harsgor studied in France for six years. For his academic achievement Harsgor was awarded the degree of Docteur d'État, a degree which is usually not awarded to foreigners. Between 1962 and 1966 Harsgor taught history in the municipal Ironi Dalet High School in Tel Aviv.

In 1974, Harsgor was in Lisbon during the Carnation Revolution, and as a result, the history of Portugal became one of his major topics of interest.

For more than twenty years, Harsgor hosted the regularly weekly seven o'clock evening program "Sha'a Historit" ('History Hour') on the Galatz radio station, together with the Israeli radio broadcaster Alex Ansky.

His grandson is former deputy mayor of Kfar Saba, Ilai Harsgor Hendin.

Harsgor died on 10 February 2011 at the age of 86 in the city of Kfar Saba due to kidney disease.
