= 't Brouwerskolkje =

Former restaurant in Overveen, Netherlands

Coordinates: 52°23′19.89″N 4°35′55.03″E

Restaurant 't Brouwerskolkje
- Interactive map of Restaurant 't Brouwerskolkje

Restaurant information
- Head chef: Moshik Roth
- Food type: International
- Rating: Michelin Guide
- Location: Brouwerskolkweg 5, Overveen, Netherlands
- Seating capacity: 30
- Website: Official website

't Brouwerskolkje is a defunct restaurant located in Overveen, Netherlands. It was a fine dining restaurant that was awarded one Michelin star in the period 2006–2008 and two Michelin stars in the period 2009–2012. GaultMillau awarded the restaurant 18.0 out of 20 points.

The head chef was Moshik Roth.

Restaurant 't Brouwerskolkje was a member of Les Patrons Cuisiniers.

The restaurant closed 14 April 2012. Its successor opened in August as "&samhoud places" in Amsterdam which has since been renamed "&moshik" after the chef.

== See also ==
- List of Michelin starred restaurants in the Netherlands
