= Eyal Shani =

Israeli chef

Eyal Shani אייל שני
- Born: 6 January 1959 (age 67)
- Culinary career
- Television shows
- MasterChef Israel; איפה האוכל?; אוכל למחשבה

Eyal Shani (Hebrew: אייל שני; born 6 January 1959) is an Israeli celebrity chef noted for creating the Miznon restaurant chain.

== Culinary career ==
Shani, a self-taught chef, opened the Israeli fine dining restaurant, Ocean, in 1989. After closing Ocean, he spent several years as a restaurant consultant.

Shani opened the first restaurant in his contemporary casual chain, Miznon, in 2011. It has since expanded to an international chain with restaurants in Paris, Vienna, Melbourne, Las Vegas, Singapore, London, New York, and Toronto.

Shani's signature dishes at Miznon include whole, roasted cauliflower, and “run over potato”, a baked potato mixed with garlic, green onions, and sour cream and served paper-thin.

Shani opened HaSalon in Tel Aviv and Givatayim in 2008. Eyal is the head chef at the restaurant, which opens only two nights a week. Richard Vines, restaurant reviewer for Bloomberg, described the food at HaSalon as "simple but epic." Gault Millau named it one of the top restaurants in Israel in 2018.

In April 2019, Shani and longtime business partner Shachar Segal opened HaSalon in Hell's Kitchen, New York City. In July 2023, HaSalon opened another location at the Venetian Resort in Las Vegas.

In May 2022, Shani opened Shmoné, meaning "eight" in Hebrew, in New York City. The restaurant featured a new menu every day. Shmoné earned a Michelin Star in March 2023, Shani's first.

He is a judge on MasterChef Israel. During the 10th MasterChef season in 2022, Shani was criticized after he discriminated against a contestant who lives in Bat Ayin based on his residence. He denounced the contestant for choosing to live in a location beyond the Green Line. Critics called for Shani's removal from the show.

In December 2024, Shani opened up Malka in West Palm Beach. Shani has opened 40 restaurants around the world. Of those 40 restaurants, the only kosher ones are his four Malka locations, Dvora in Tel Aviv and two kosher-certified Miznons in NY/NJ.

== Reception ==
Writer Liel Leibovitz called Shani "Israel's most celebrated chef", and concluded that "Eyal Shani is a genius." Another critic claims he had one of the worst meals in his life at one of Shani's restaurants, saying "It feels like you're being scammed. He doesn't even deserve the title of 'Chef'. His mannerisms are only there to cover for bad cooking." New York Post's Steve Cuozzo noted that on a trip to Israel, many chefs he spoke to said Shani is "regarded as a joke" in his home country. At a 2017 conference devoted to Israeli cuisine sponsored by American University in Washington, D.C., “Israeli Cuisine as a Reflection of Israeli Society,” Foodie and artist Dr. Yael Raviv, author of “Falafel Nation,” criticized Shani as one of the Israeli chefs who attempted to claim credit for inventing an eggplant dish with tahini called "eggplant carpaccio" which is in fact baba ghanoush. The allegation is part of ongoing discussions on the politics of food in the Arab-Israeli conflict. While HaSalon enjoyed moderate popularity since opening, it drew criticism for its high prices. Shauna Lyon, in a review published by The New Yorker wrote "The prices are so high that you might find yourself straining to calculate the best deals." Cuozzo was also critical: "Many of the Mediterranean menu’s scandalously priced stinkers were just meh", and concluded "HaSalon translates as the salon or, as applied to this venue, the living room. But it might as well mean, Ha, suckers! The joke’s on us."
