= Yonatan Roshfeld =

Yonatan Roshfeld (Hebrew: יונתן רושפלד; born 10 January 1969) is an Israeli chef known for his work on television. He was a judge on the television cooking competition MasterChef Israel from the second season to the sixth. He opened the Captain Curry Indian food stall in Sarona Market. He was the food critic in the first Israeli season of The Next Restaurant TV show. He became a partner in the Cafeteria restaurant in the Gindi TLV compound in Tel Aviv and opened a delicatessen in Ramat Gan. He is perhaps best known as the chef of the Herbert Samuel restaurant in Tel Aviv, which later closed and kosher venues with the same name were opened in other places.

Roshfeld was born in the Ruhama kibbutz in southern Israel in 1969; his father was a baker, and his mother was a factory worker. He was a talented musician as a youth and in the Israel Defense Forces and studied at a New York school. During his musical studies he was drawn to cooking and went to study in France. At first, he was at Strasbourg but could not connect with the heavy cooking there. He then moved to Cannes, studying under two-star Michelin chef Jacques Chibois.
