= Miznon =

Israeli Restaurant chain

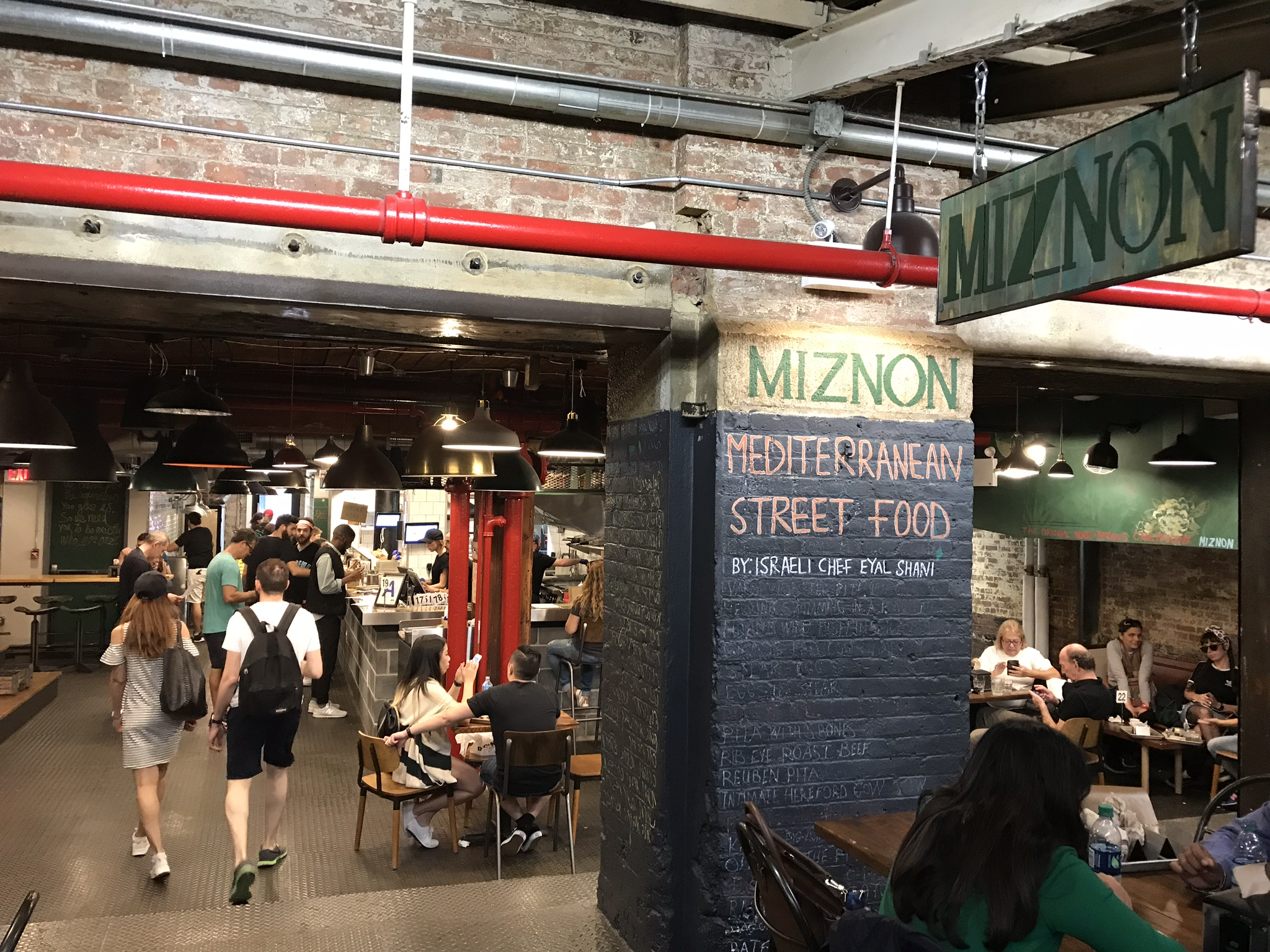
- Miznon restaurant located at Chelsea Market in New York City

Restaurant information
- Established: 2011
- Chef: Eyal Shani
- Food type: Contemporary casual
- Location: Various locations, Tel Aviv, Las Vegas, New York, Paris, Vienna, Melbourne, Toronto, Singapore, London

Miznon (Hebrew: מזנון; English: Canteen), stylised as MIZNON, is an Israeli chain of contemporary casual restaurants created by chef Eyal Shani, with branches around the world.

The first Miznon opened in Tel Aviv in 2011.

== Cuisine ==
Miznon sells pita bread, served fresh from the oven with fillings such as moussaka, ratatouille, and lobster with crème fraîche.

== Response ==
Writing in The New Yorker, food critic Hannah Goldfield describes Miznon itself as "a small, beloved international chain." In describing the food, Goldfield wrote, "It seems almost unfair to compare Miznon pita to any other pita. Miznon pita is plush, Miznon pita is pillowy—I would happily take a nap on a stack of Miznon pita."

Richard Vines, restaurant reviewer for Bloomberg, described the food at Miznon, Tel Aviv, as "superb and inexpensive... The pita itself is soft and fluffy, more like a folded pancake than bread," while the meat wrapped inside the pita bread "has great depth." The London Miznon locations have been reviewed by British food and lifestyle publications, including The Guardian, the Evening Standard and Time Out London.

== Locations ==
Miznon has locations in Las Vegas, New York, Paris, Vienna, Melbourne, Toronto, Singapore, Taipei, Tel Aviv, and London.

While some dishes are served across the chain, each location serves unique dishes created by chef Shani for that particular neighborhood and city.
