= HaSalon =

Fine-dining restaurant chain

Restaurant information
- Owner: Eyal Shani
- Food type: Mediterranean cuisine
- Location: International chain

HaSalon (Hebrew:the living room) is a chain of fine dining restaurants that serves Mediterranean cuisine created by chef Eyal Shani, with locations around the world. Customers are invited to dance on the tables while DJ's play high-tempo music and house lights change to strobe lights.

== Locations ==
The first HaSalon opened in Tel Aviv.

HaSalon has since expanded internationally with locations in the Hell's Kitchen neighborhood of New York City in April 2019 along with Miami in 2019 and Las Vegas which opened inside The Venetian on the Las Vegas Strip in 2023.
