= Rafi Adar =

Israeli businessperson

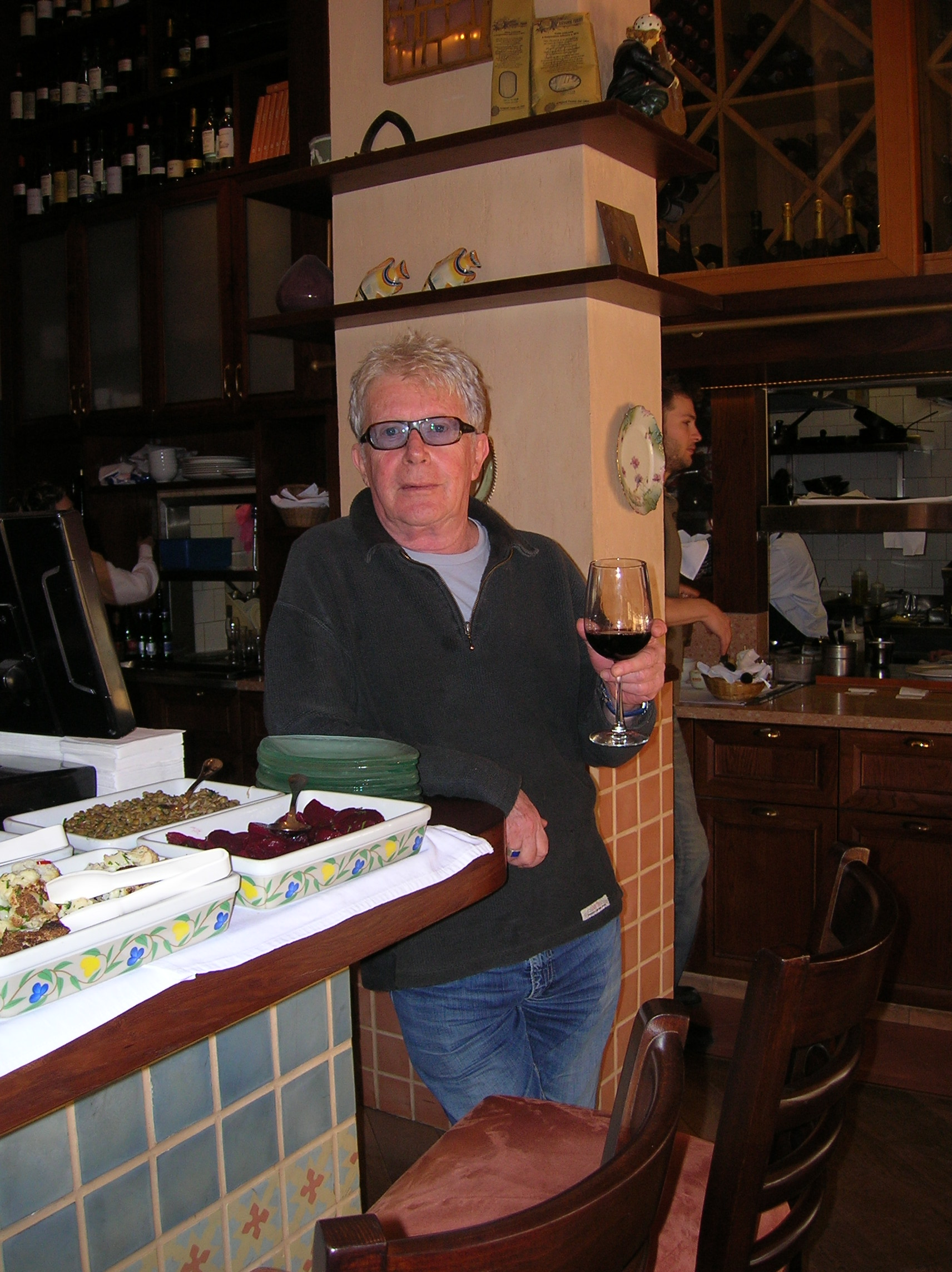
- Born: רפי אדר; March 3, 1946 (age 80)
- Culinary career
- Current restaurant
- Pronto
- Television show
- MasterChef Israel

Rafi Adar (Hebrew: רפי אדר; born 1946) is a chef, restauranteur, filmmaker, and singer. He is well known in the landscape of Israeli culture.

== Film and music career ==
Adar went to Italy to study medicine but ended up studying film in Rome.

In 1976, he directed the short film "Baderech Lod" (On the Way to Lod), based on a story by Dan Ben Amotz which involves two young students from Bnei Shemen in 1939, who embark on a trip to the neighboring Arab city of Lod. In 1986 Adar co-wrote and co-directed the film Gloves, a big-screen adaptation of Dan Tsalka’s novel together with Yehudit Solah, his wife. Adar also co-produced the 1983 film Private Manoeuvres, a spinoff of the hit group, Lemon Popsicle, together with Danny Dimbort. He also filmed the only Israeli film on boxing.

As an actor, Adar has appeared in a number of films including Shalom (Wayfarer’s Prayer) (Yaky Yosha, 1973), and Cables (Tzvi Shissel, 1992).

Adar has also recorded music. In 1994, he released an album titled "Halev Hamale Shel Konketa" (Konketa's Full Heart) with Helicon Records. In 2007, he recorded another album with the same label, performing songs by Italian musician Paolo Conte, titled "Mezaif Kmo Kulam: Rafi Adar Sings Paolo Conte." In 2016, he released his fourth album, "The Golem."

== Restaurant career ==
In 1989, he opened the successful Italian restaurant, Pronto, in Tel Aviv. The restaurant is known for its Antipasto dish, named after Shalom Hanoch.

In 1997, Adar received the "Ristorante – Italiano" award from the chambers of commerce of Italy, awarded by the President of Italy, Oscar Luigi Scalfaro, at the presidential palace in Rome. In 1998, he was awarded the title "Cavaliere dela Republica Italiana" by the President of Italy for his contribution to promoting Italian culture abroad.

"Pronto" was also selected as one of the ten best restaurants in Israel by Daniel Rogov, the restaurant critic of Haaretz. The Time Out Tel Aviv magazine chose Pronto as the best Italian restaurant for years 2007, 2008, and 2011.

Musician Ofer Zamir, who worked in the restaurant from 1994 became a partner in 2005. Culture, Love," a cookbook featuring recipes from Pronto, co-authored with Ari De Luca.

In March 2017, Adar sold his stake in the restaurant to Victor Shmarik.

In 2009, Adar served as a judge on the Israeli television show "Restaurant Champion." In 2010, he was one of four judges on "MasterChef," alongside Haim Cohen, Eyal Shani, and Michal Ansky, but he was eliminated from the show after several episodes.
