= Ansky (black hole) =

Black hole in the constellation Virgo

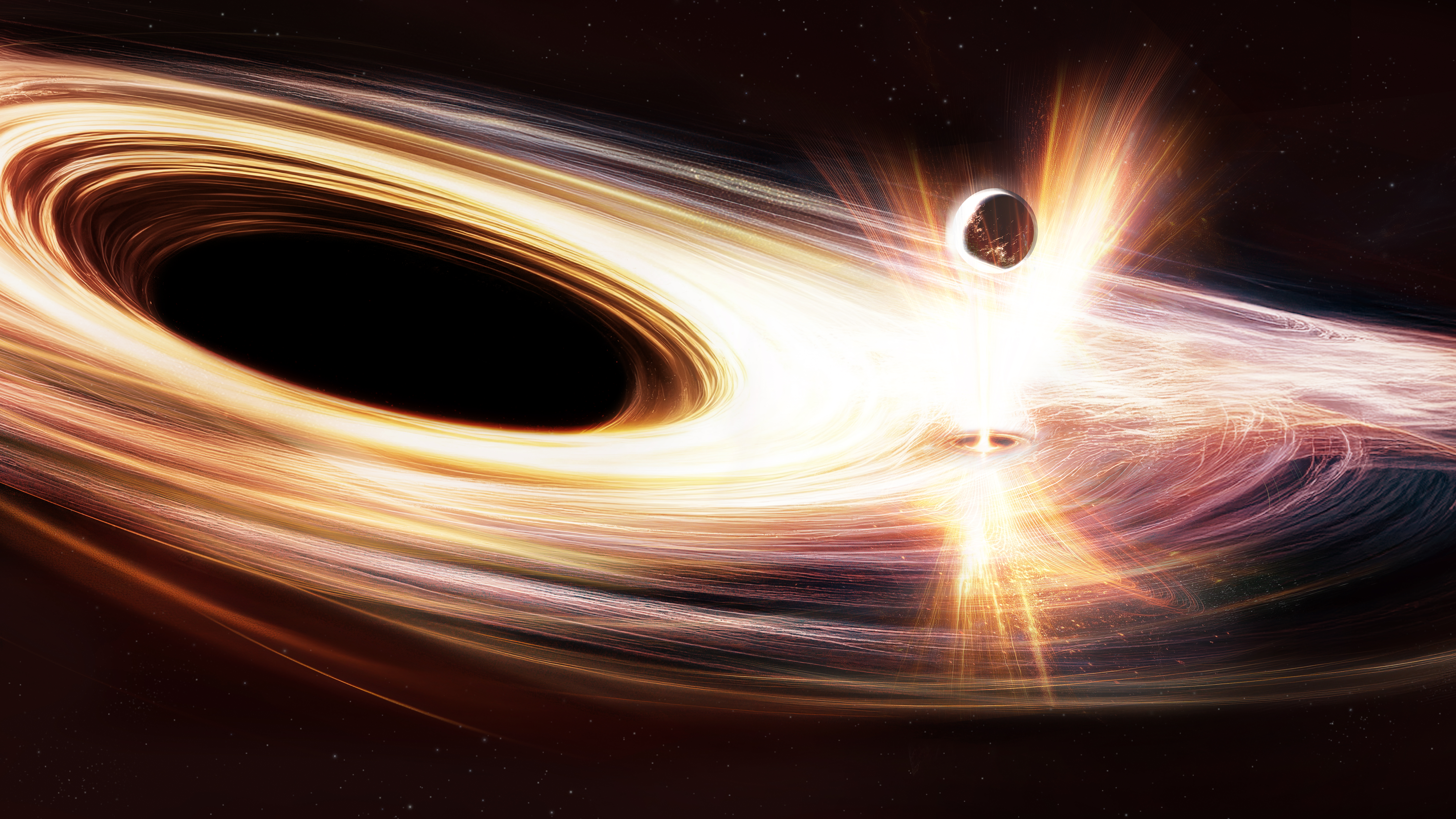
Artist's impression of a mechanism that may be causing Ansky's bursts of X-ray radiation.

Ansky is the nickname for a supermassive black hole located in the galaxy SDSS J133519.91+072807.4 (SDSS1335+0728), approximately 300 million light-years from Earth in the constellation Virgo. The black hole gained attention in 2019 when it transitioned from dormancy to an active state, producing extreme quasi-periodic eruptions (QPEs) of X-ray radiation. It represents the first observed case of a supermassive black hole awakening in real time.

== Discovery ==
The galaxy SDSS1335+0728 remained inactive for two decades before suddenly brightening in December 2019. The Zwicky Transient Facility (ZTF) detected this optical brightening and assigned the designation ZTF19acnskyy. The nickname "Ansky" derives from the suffix "acnskyy" in this original identifier.

The initial brightening was discovered through the ALeRCE (Automatic Learning for the Rapid Classification of Events) machine learning classification system. For four years following the 2019 event, the galaxy exhibited optical variability without detectable X-ray emissions.

The central black hole has an estimated mass of approximately 10^6 solar masses. The host galaxy SDSS1335+0728 is classified as an early-type galaxy located at redshift z=0.024. The galaxy is now classified as a galaxy with active galactic nucleus.

== Quasi-periodic eruptions ==
In February 2024, astronomers detected recurring X-ray flares from Ansky, marking the beginning of unprecedented quasi-periodic eruptions. These eruptions exhibit several extreme characteristics: each eruption lasts approximately 1.5 days; QPEs repeat every 4.5 days, the longest interval observed for any QPE source. Each burst releases approximately 10^48 ergs, representing 100 times more energy than typical QPEs, ten times more luminous than standard QPEs. A longer 25-day cycle containing cascades of five consecutive eruptions was also found. The eruptions involve the ejection of approximately one Jupiter mass of material at velocities reaching 15% of the speed of light. Ansky is the first supermassive black hole observed transitioning from dormancy to activity. Observed QPEs are the most energetic and longest-duration QPEs on record. The source lacks evidence of recent stellar destruction, suggesting QPEs can occur through newly formed accretion flows rather than only after star disruption events.

== Observational campaigns ==
Multiple space-based telescopes have monitored Ansky since its activation:

- NASA's NICER space telescope conducted high-cadence monitoring from May to July 2024, observing the source approximately 16 times daily
- ESA's XMM-Newton provided three 30-kilosecond dedicated observations and detected the quiescent accretion disk between eruptions
- NASA's Swift Observatory contributed to initial follow-up observations
- NASA's Chandra X-ray Observatory was a part of the multi-instrument monitoring campaign

These observations detected 165 QPE events during the initial monitoring period and captured 12 near-consecutive flares over a 60-day campaign.

== Theoretical models ==
Current theories propose that QPEs result from interactions between the black hole's accretion disk and orbiting objects. For Ansky, researchers suggest a larger debris disk around the black hole, which is "larger and can involve objects farther away" than usually theorised.

Since activation, Ansky has shown systematic changes across the electromagnetic spectrum:

- Ultraviolet: Four times brighter than pre-2019 levels since 2021
- Mid-infrared: More than doubled in brightness since June 2022, with reddening of the W1-W2 color
- X-ray: Emissions began in February 2024, transitioning from undetectable to extreme QPE behavior
- Optical: Persistent variability since December 2019, with spectroscopic changes indicating enhanced ionization
