= Haim Cohen =

Israeli professor of Biology

- חיים כהן
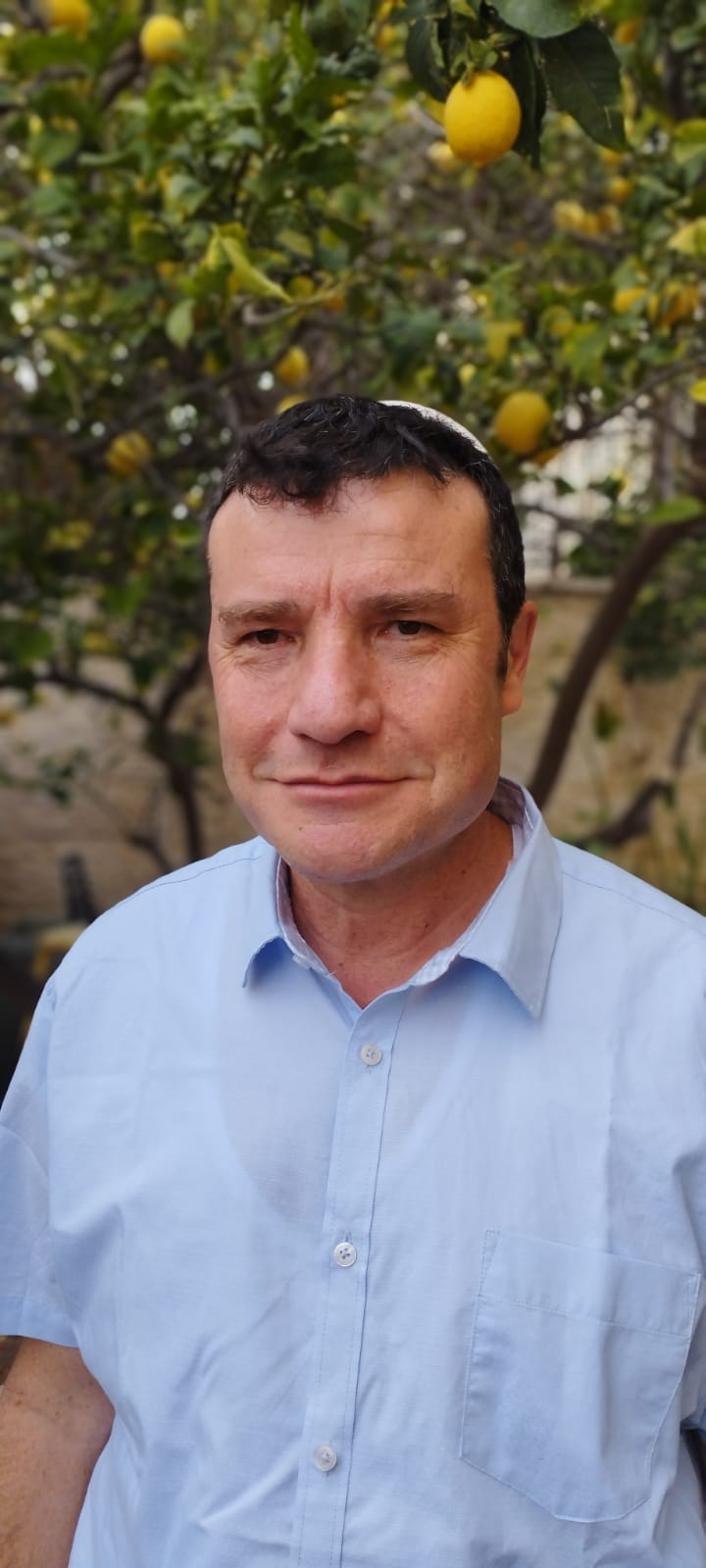
- Born: April 12, 1968 (age 57); Jerusalem, Israel
- Citizenship: Israeli
- Spouse: Debbie Cohen
- Children: 4
- Scientific career
- Fields: Life Sciences, Aging
- Institutions: Bar Ilan University

Haim Cohen (Hebrew: חיים כהן; born April 12, 1968) is an Israeli scientist. He is full professor at the Faculty of Life Sciences at Bar Ilan University who studies the molecular mechanisms that determine the rate of aging. Cohen researches longevity and healthy aging. He is the founder and director of the Master's degree program in gerontology at Bar Ilan University. He also heads the Minerva Israel-Germany Center for Biological Mechanisms of Aging, and heads the Sagol Healthy Aging and Longevity Center in Humans.

== Biography ==
Haim Cohen was born and raised in Jerusalem to Gedaliah and Rachel Cohen, who was granted in 2000 the honor of "Yakir Yerushalayim" by Jerusalem municipality to valued members of the community. He was educated at Or Etzion Yeshiva High School and joined the religious kibbutz yeshiva in Ein Zurim.

Cohen is married to Dr. Debbie Cohen (director of the Educational Psychological Service in Be'er Ya'akov, Israel) and they have four children. He lives in Modiin.

== Academic career ==
In 1991, he began his undergraduate studies in life sciences at Bar Ilan University, which he graduated summa laude in 1994. From 1994 to 1999 he studied genetics under the supervision of Giora Simhan in a direct-path Ph.D program and from 1999 to 2004, studied postdoctoral studies at Harvard Medical School in Boston under the supervision of David Sinclair. During his postdoctoral studies he studied sirtuin-1 (SIRT1) enzyme, part of the sirtuins family of enzymes involved in longevity and aging. He demonstrated in a series of studies how the increase of SIRT1 activity, resulting from calorie restriction, supports healthy longevity. His research was published in a series of articles in Molecular Cell scientific journal and Science Magazine.

In 2004 he joined the Faculty of Life Sciences, Bar-Ilan University, as the head of the Molecular Mechanisms of Aging’s lab. Between the years 2012–2015, he served as head department in the Faculty of Life Sciences at Bar-Ilan University. In 2019 he founded a master's degree program in gerontology which he heads. This program is a unique program that combines social sciences and life sciences. Since 2019, Cohen has served as the head of the Minerva Israel-Germany Center for the Study of the Biological Mechanisms of Aging, and as the Head of the Sagol Healthy Longevity Center in Humans.

== Research ==
Cohen's scientific contributions deal with the role of metabolism in determining the rate of aging, with an emphasis on how the sirtuin-6 (SIRT6) enzyme controls healthy aging. The research methods he used included molecular biology, proteomics, physiology, biochemistry, metabolomics, and the use of research animals (yeast and transgenic mice).

In the course of his research, Cohen showed that SIRT6 protein levels increase under conditions of calorie restriction and even fasting. These findings suggested that SIRT6 protein plays a key role in extending lifespan and prolonging healthy life through caloric restriction. As a result, Cohen created transgenic mice that express the SIRT6 protein at high levels and found that these mice live longer by 30% on average. Similar to calorie restriction, these mice also age more slowly and maintain young mice like metabolism.In addition, in the same mice, among other things, age-related diabetes, as well as inflammation were significantly eliminated. Moreover, Cohen's work showed that old transgenic mice maintained the same metabolites profile as a young mice and gene expression almost identical to gene expression under calorie restriction. Furthermore, he found that SIRT6 protein protects against the development of the phenomenon of frailty that characterizes the elderly, mainly expressed mainly as fatigue and inactivity. At a very old age, mice that overexpressed the protein showed the same level of physical activity as young mice.

Cohen was able to prove that the ability to stay active in old age is due to maintaining energy production in an old mouse through the activation of Gluconeogenesis and fat burning just like in a young mouse. Through these series of studies, Cohen proved that SIRT6 is a key protein in metabolism and in determining healthy life expectancy. Earlier, Cohen's research focused on SIRT6's role in obesity. It was demonstrated that, overexpression of the SIRT6 protein, protects against the damages of obesity and against the metabolic syndrome. In a series of other studies on liver metabolism, Cohen presented the mechanism by which SIRT6 protein prevents the formation of fats and cholesterol, by suppressing their formation through SREBP1/2 and increasing fat burning by activating PPARa, as well as suppressing Mir122. In addition, as part of this research, Cohen's work characterized a number of microRNAs that control the level of SIRT6.

In addition to these studies, Haim Cohen's research focused on other areas related to his understanding of the aging process. In the first, Cohen showed, for the first time, how the repair protein Ku70 controls cell death through its action as deubiquitinase. This finding is important for our understanding of how the cell links DNA damage to cell death. In another big data study, he demonstrated that by genetic manipulations or diets it is possible to extend the maximum life expectancy of a person beyond what has been observed so far.

Recently, Prof. Cohen's research has focused on understanding the metabolic pathways that are activated by physical activity. In his research, Cohen showed that among several areas of the brain, during physical activity, the hypothalamus in the brain activates metabolic pathways similar to a muscle. This finding strengthens our understanding of the role of the hypothalamus as a unique metabolic tissue.

In 2013, Cohen, together with Boaz Misholi and Bar-Ilan University, established the company SIRTLAB, which operates on the basis of Cohen's research to manufacture a drug to increase SIRT6 using a number of technologies, which have been registered in a number of patents. These days, the company, in which Cohen serves as chief scientist, is currently preparing for a trial in human subjects.

Over the years, Cohen has published dozens of articles.

== Awards and grants ==
Cohen has won several scientific awards such as the Marcus Prize and the Taubenblatt Award for Excellence in Medical Research (2014) and the Rector's Prize for Excellence in Research (2017).
He has also received a number of research grants, including the National Science Foundation, the Israel-U.S. Binational Foundation (BSF), the Israel-Germany Foundation, the Teva Grant to Research Centers of Excellence, the I-CORE Israeli Center for Research Excellence, the Alon Fellowship Grant, and the ERC grant of the European Union.
