= Herbert Samuel restaurant =

Defunct restaurant in Tel Aviv, Israel

Coordinates: 32.1627°N 34.7970°E

Herbert Samuel

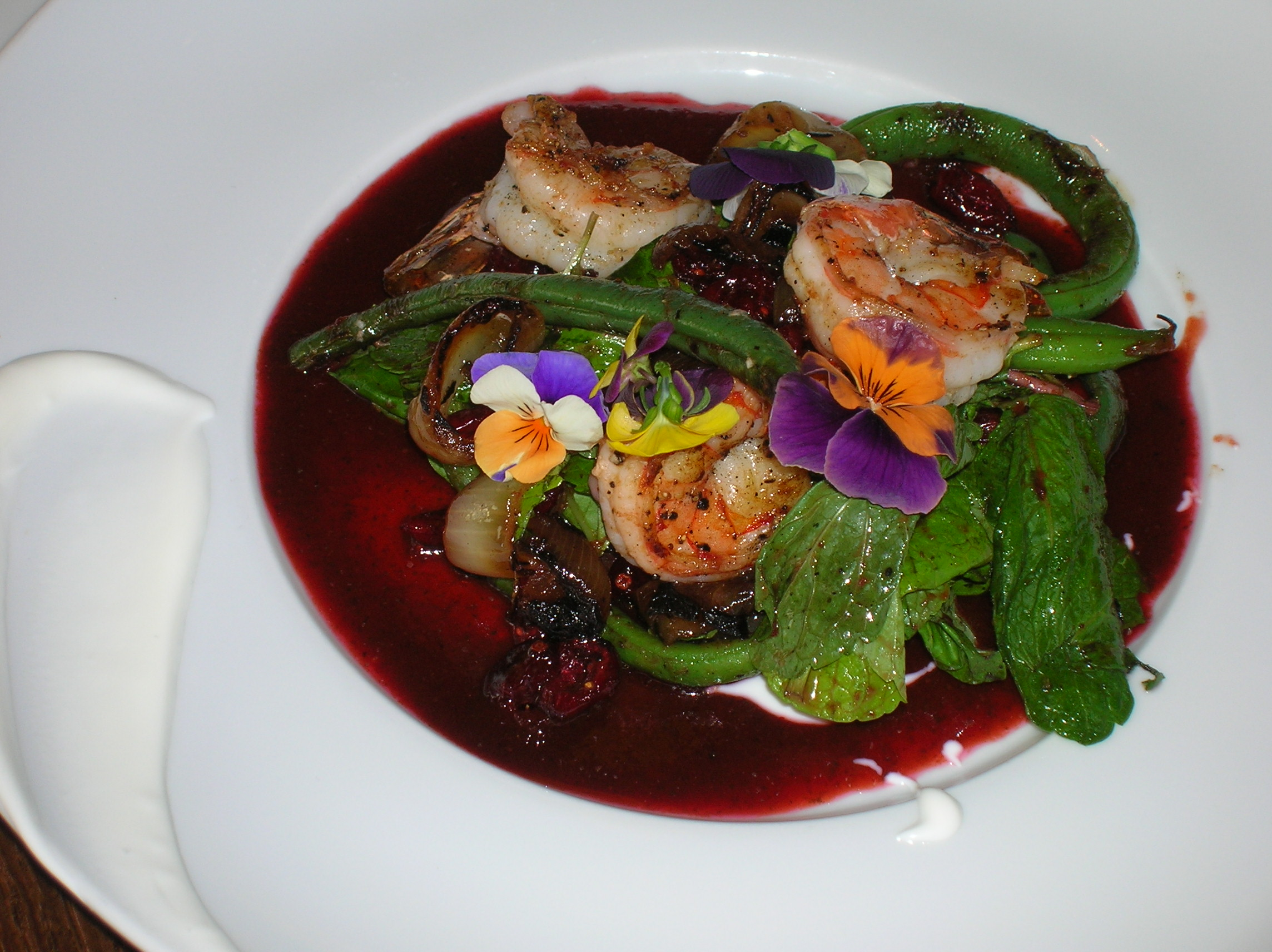
- Interactive map of Herbert Samuel

Restaurant information
- Chef: Kobi Obayon (Herzliya)
- Food type: Kosher fine dining
- Location: Ritz Carlton Hotel, Herzliya, Israel
- Website: www.herbertsamuel.co.il/english/

The Herbert Samuel restaurant (Hebrew: הרברט סמואל) is a kosher fine-dining restaurant in Herzliya, Israel. It was established as a branch of a non-kosher restaurant in Tel Aviv that has since closed.

Herbert Samuel in Tel Aviv often appeared on lists of top restaurants; it was so listed by La Liste and by the French Foreign Ministry.

In 2016 Herbert Samuel opened a kosher edition in Herzliya; Yonatan Roshfeld was the chef. In 2016 Herbert Samuel opened a Jerusalem branch, in the Herbert Samuel Hotel, which was kosher. The restaurant in Jerusalem "closed" the same year. In reality, it continued operating as the dining hall of the Herbert Samuel Hotel but it is no longer branded as the Herbert Samuel restaurant. There are additional Herbert Samuel hotels in Israel in a similar setup.

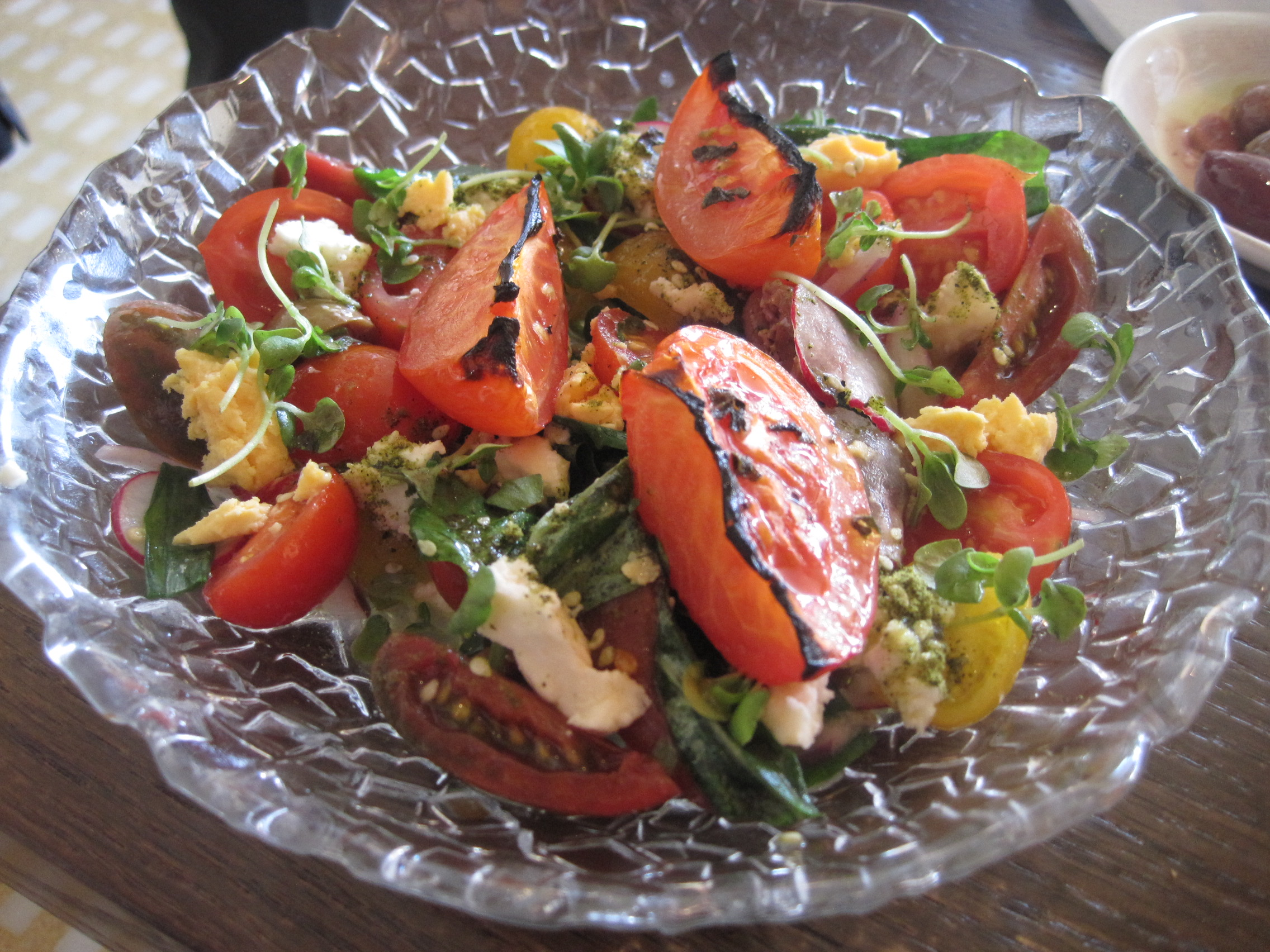
Tomato salad, from the restaurant

The signature dish of the Herzliya restaurant, located in the Ritz Carlton Hotel, is a tomato salad made with seven varieties of tomatoes, tossed together with olives, radishes, onion, scallion, and fresh basil by chef Kobi Obayon.

The Tel Aviv Herbert Samuel closed in August 2016.
