= Alex Ansky =

Israeli actor (born 1939)

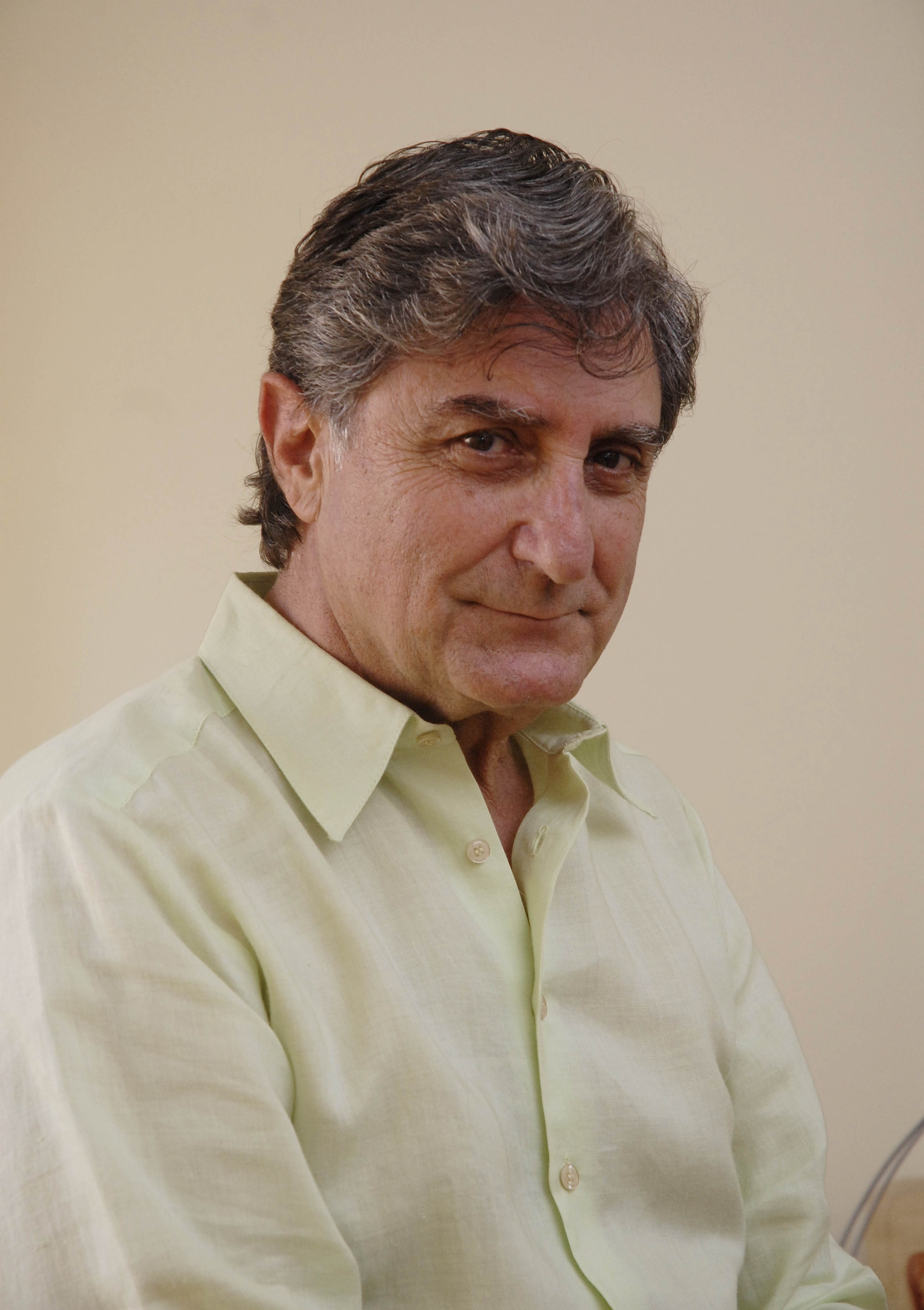
- Born: May 26, 1939; Sofia, Bulgaria
- Occupations: Theater actor, Film actor, Radio broadcaster, Voice actor
- Years active: 1950–present

Alex Ansky (born Alexander Ansky (Abarbanel); May 26, 1939) is an Israeli theater and film actor, radio broadcaster, and voice actor.

== Biography ==
Alex Ansky was born in Sofia, Bulgaria, to Gisela, a radio broadcaster and actress, and Eliezer Ansky, a theater director and Zionist activist. As a child, he performed in the children's theater founded by his father, Bamatenu ("Our Stage"), part of the Ohel Theater. He attended Tichon Hadash high school in Tel Aviv.

Ansky studied drama at the Habima drama school and later graduated from the RCA School of Communications in New York.

In 1977, he participated in the Likud election campaign team. In 1978, he published the book Selling the Likud (Hebrew: מכירת הליכוד), about the behind-the-scenes of the 1977 election campaign.

== Radio career ==
From the 1970s, Ansky hosted the morning show Seven Zero Seven (Sheva Efel Sheva) on Galei Tzahal, Israel's Army Radio. The program ended but returned in a renewed format in 2001. He later hosted shows on various regional radio stations.

Until 2005, he co-hosted the popular historical program A Historic Hour (Sha'a Historit) with historian Michael Harsegor for over 420 episodes. He also managed the station's announcers department and occasionally hosted the program Mother's Voice (Kola Shel Ima).

In the 2010s, he hosted a personal current affairs show on Galei Tzahal on Fridays and Saturdays. In 2017, he publicly criticized MK Moshe Gafni for encouraging ultra-Orthodox men not to enlist in the Israel Defense Forces. His remarks, calling some religious narratives "forced and even ridiculous," sparked criticism from religious authorities, who demanded his dismissal.

In January 2021, Ansky left Galei Tzahal and joined Kan Kol HaMusica, where he began hosting Personal Morning with Alex Ansky (Shacharit Ishit).

He frequently lends his voice to commercials, and hosts literary and musical events.

== Theater career ==
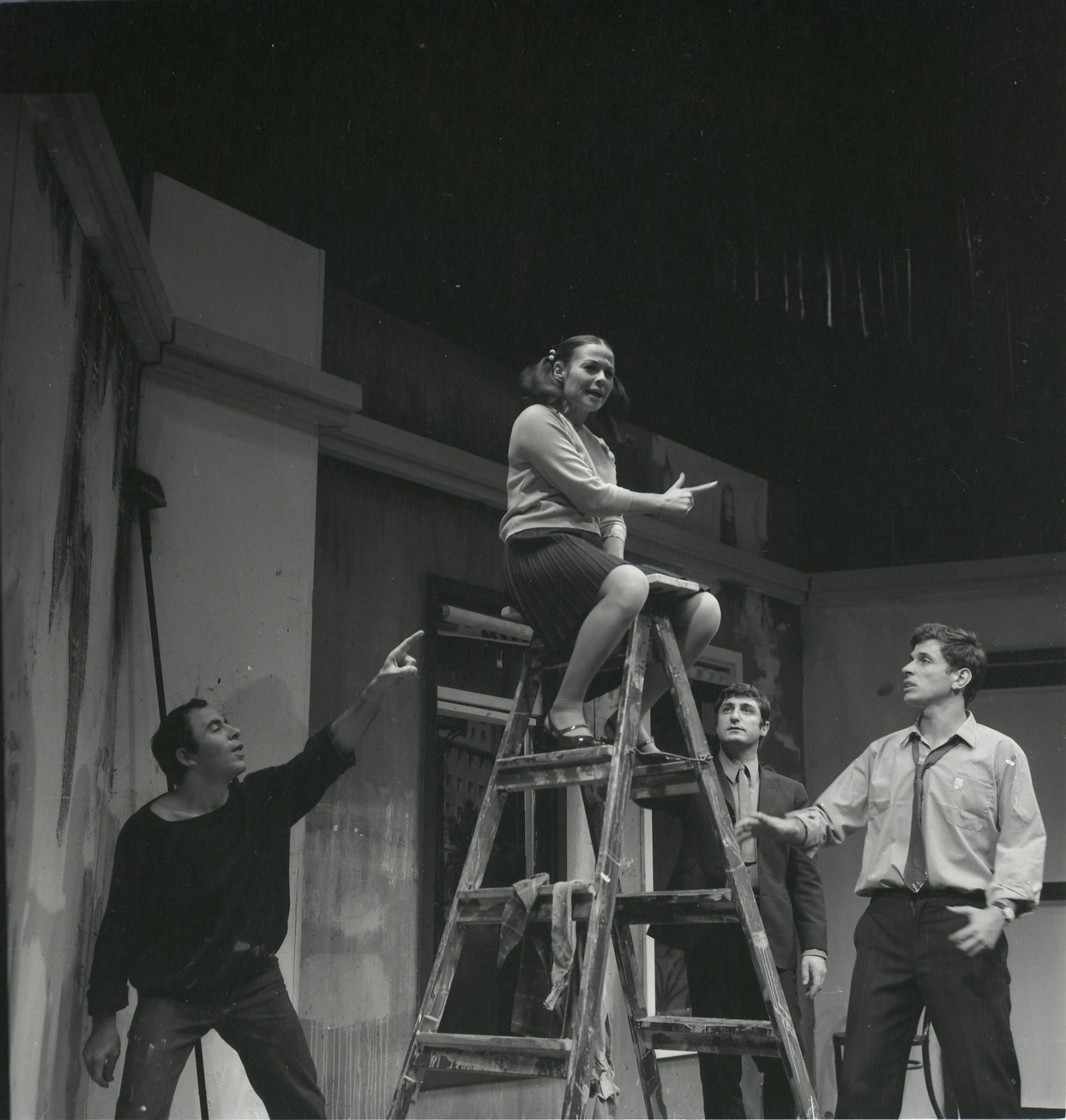
Ansky, Yosef Carmon, and Gila Almagor, 1967

Alongside his radio work, Ansky has had a long stage career, performing at Habima, The Cameri, Haifa, Beersheba Theater, and Bamat HaShakhnim (Actors' Stage).

His notable stage works include: Alfi, Mimale Makom, Love Letters, Pygmalion, Broken Glass, Amy's World, Herod, Antigone, Cry, the Beloved Country, and Malcolm the Small and His War with the Eunuchs.

He also performed monodramas, including:

- I Am Not Dreyfus
- Navelot
- Reverse

In autumn 2014, he staged a solo show Live Broadcast Fall (Nefila BeShidur Chai), written by Aryeh Krishik and directed by Alex Kagan. It portrayed the final days of a prominent broadcaster and addressed social protest and personal despair, including the self-immolation of Moshe Silman. The play toured Israel and later traveled to Paris, Rome, and New York.

Ansky also hosted major memorial ceremonies for Holocaust Remembrance Day at Yad Vashem.

In 1991, he sued journalist Amnon Dankner for defamation following allegations of sexual misconduct published in a biography of Dan Ben Amotz. The case went to arbitration under Tommy Lapid and ended in a settlement.

In 2018, he received a **lifetime achievement award** from **A.M.I. (Israel Artists Association)**. In 2019, he was named **Yakir Tel Aviv** (Honored Citizen of Tel Aviv-Yafo).

Since mid-2020, he has performed his solo stage adaptation of Plato's Apology of Socrates.

== Television and film career ==
Between 2004 and 2005, he portrayed **Attorney Yigal Appelbaum** in the telenovela Our Song. In 2007, he played **Dov Greenbaum** in the first season of Masakhim and **Rami** in Good Tidings. In 2008, he appeared as the father of Aya (played by Liron Weisman) in Five Men and a Wedding. In 2009, he portrayed **Eli Almadan** and **Meir Fedida** in the third season of The Champion, and from 2009–2010 he played **Amnon Green**, a high school principal, in Split.

In 2010, he played **Rubi** in Michal Bat-Adam's film Maya. He also lent his voice to Rechov Sumsum (Israeli Sesame Street), Disney's Fantasia (short version), and the 1990s Israeli computer game Ba'ikvot HaMilim HaAvudot ("In Search of the Lost Words").

In 2014, he starred with Moni Moshonov in the Bulgarian-Israeli co-production Bulgarian Rhapsody. In spring 2016, he narrated the chamber opera Anne Frank directed by Alex Kagan, and acted in Dan Wolman's film An Israeli Love Story as President Yitzhak Ben-Zvi. In 2018, he appeared in the dark comedy Madam Yankelova's Fine Literature Club.

== Awards ==
- Ziv Prize for Ethical Journalism (1984)
- Five-time recipient of the Galei Tzahal Commander's Award
- A.M.I. Lifetime Achievement Award (2018)
- Yakir Tel Aviv (2019)

== Personal life ==
Ansky married three times. From his first marriage, he has one son. From his second marriage to Sherry Ansky, he has two children: journalist and chef Michal Ansky and Hillel Ansky. His third wife, **Chamotal**, head of the Israel-France Chamber of Commerce, died in 2023.
