= Haim Cohen (chef) =

Israeli television presenter

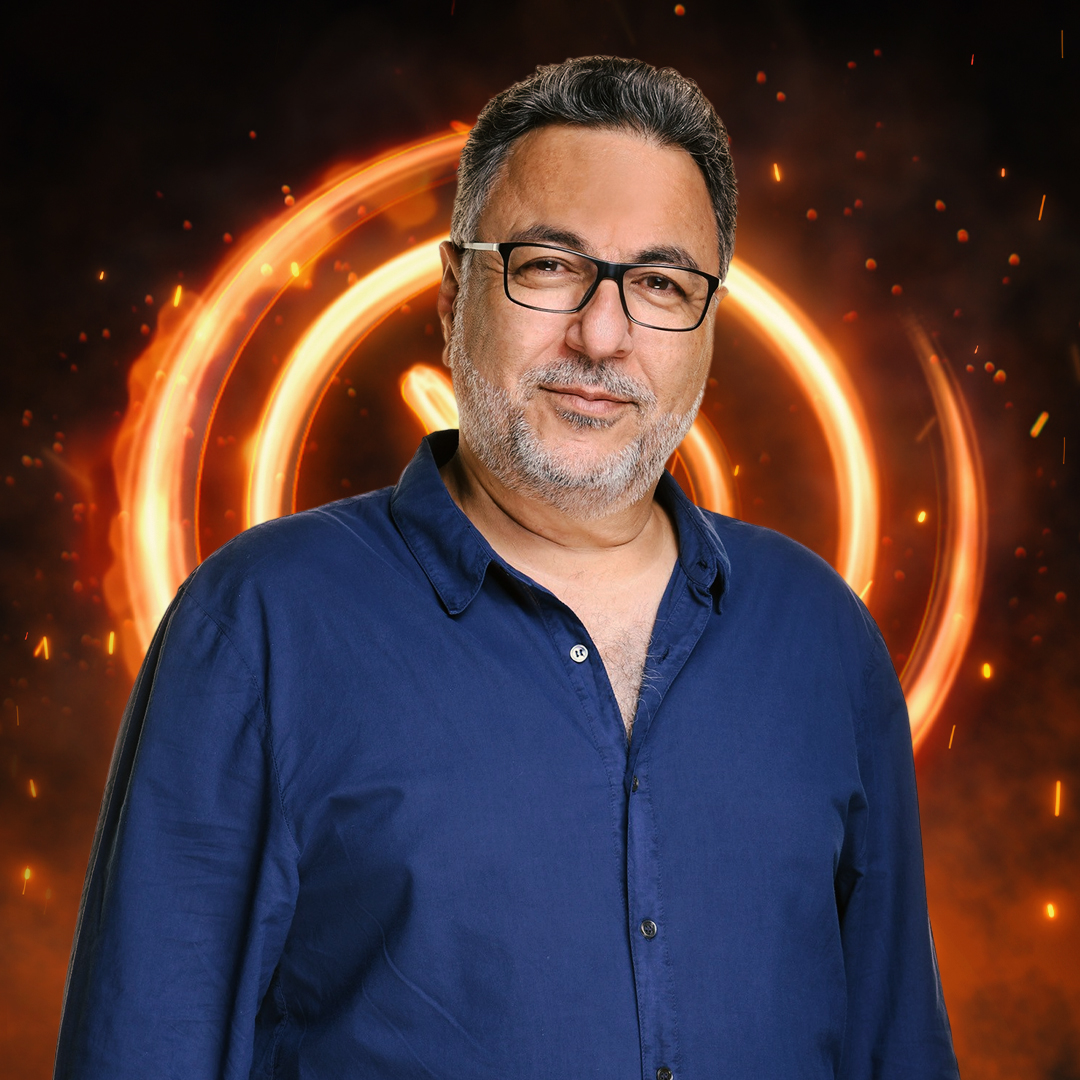
- Born: March 21, 1960
- Culinary career
- Television show: * MasterChef Israel

Haim Cohen (Hebrew: חיים כהן; born 21 March 1960) is an Israeli chef, and cookbook author.

== Biography ==
Haim Cohen lives in Savyon with his wife, Sigal, and their three children.

== Culinary and media career ==
Haim Cohen founded the former "Keren" restaurant, and went on to found restaurants such as "Yafo Tel Aviv" and "Dixie".

He was the host of Israel's first TV food show, Garlic, Pepper, and Olive Oil. He has been a judge on all of MasterChef Israel's seasons. He is also a judge on Israel's My Kitchen Rules.

In 2020, he was hired by Microsoft to oversee dining in the Herzliya campus. He has helped rehabilitate released prisoners with a cookbook.

In 2021, students at Bezalel Academy of Art and Design were asked to design sets of kitchen utensils to be used by chefs for intimate dinners and private events. Cohen served as culinary mentor.

In 2023, Cohen began operating the Knesset cafeteria.

== See also ==
- Israeli cuisine
