= List of restaurants in Amsterdam =

This is a list of notable restaurants in Amsterdam, Netherlands. There were 1,861 restaurants in Amsterdam in 2023.

== Restaurants ==
- Ciel Bleu, a fine dining restaurant
- De Kas, a farm-to-table restaurant
- FEBO, a chain of Dutch walk-up fast food restaurants of the automat type
- Nam Kee, a chain of three Chinese restaurants
- Restaurant Vermeer, a fine dining restaurant
- RIJKS, a restaurant inside the Rijksmuseum
- Sichuan Food, a Sichuan cuisine fine dining restaurant
- Spectrum, a fine dining restaurant
- The Seafood Bar, a chain of seafood restaurants
- Vinkeles, a fine dining restaurant
- Yamazato, a fine dining restaurant

== Defunct restaurants ==
- &moshik, a defunct fine dining restaurant
- Adrian, a defunct fine dining restaurant
- De Kersentuin, a defunct fine dining restaurant
- De Trechter, a defunct fine dining restaurant
- Excelsior, a defunct fine dining restaurant
- Gravenmolen, a defunct fine dining restaurant
- La Rive, a defunct fine dining restaurant
- Le Restaurant, a defunct fine dining restaurant
- Ron Blaauw, a defunct fine dining restaurant

== Michelin restaurants ==
The Michelin Guide rated these restaurants with 1 to 3 stars in Amsterdam.

| Restaurant | Chef(s) | Cuisine | Borough / Location | Established | 1 Michelin star | 2 Michelin stars | 3 Michelin stars | Current | Ref. |
| Restaurant | Chef(s) | Cuisine | Borough / Location | Established | Year to star | | | Current | Ref. |
|---|---|---|---|---|---|---|---|---|---|
| Ciel Bleu | Arjan Speelman | French | Amsterdam-Zuid - Ferdinand Bolstraat | | | 2007-present | — | 2 Michelin stars | |
| Flore | Bas van Kranen | Contemporary, Creative French | Amsterdam-Centrum - Nieuwe Doelenstraat | | | | — | 2 Michelin stars | |
| Restaurant 212 | Richard van Oostenbrugge | Creative | | | | | — | 2 Michelin stars | |
| Spectrum | Sidney Schutte | Creative | | | | 2014-present | — | 2 Michelin stars | |
| Vinkeles | Jurgen van der Zalm | French | | | 2009 | 2023-present | — | 2 Michelin stars | |
| Bistro de la Mer | Richard van Oostenbrugge | Classic Cuisine | | | 2023-present | | — | 1 Michelin star | |
| Bolenius | Luc Kusters | Creative | | | | | — | 1 Michelin star | |
| Bougainville | Tim Golsteijn | Modern Cuisine | | | | | — | 1 Michelin star | |
| Coulisse | Tim van der Molen | Creative, Scandinavian | | | | | — | 1 Michelin star | |
| Daalder | Dennis Huwaë | Creative | | | 2021-present | | — | 1 Michelin star | |
| The Duchess | Jeffrey Graf | French, Mediterranean Cuisine | | 2015 | | | — | 1 Michelin star | |
| Graphite | Peter Gast | Creative | | | | | — | 1 Michelin star | |
| De Juwelier | Yoran Jacobi | Modern French | | | | | — | 1 Michelin star | |
| De Kas | Jos Timmer | Organic | | | | | — | 1 Michelin star | |
| Lars Amsterdam | Lars Scharp | Modern Cuisine | | | | | — | 1 Michelin star | |
| MOS | Egon van Hoof | Creative French | | | | | — | 1 Michelin star | |
| RIJKS® | Joris Bijdendijk | Creative, Modern French | | | 2023-present | | — | 1 Michelin star | |
| RON Gastrobar | Ron Blaauw | Creative French | | | 2013-present | | — | 1 Michelin star | |
| Sinne | Alexander Ioannou | Modern Kitchen, Fusion | | | | | — | 1 Michelin star | |
| The White Room | Jacob Jan Boerma | Modern Kitchen, European contemporary | | | | | — | 1 Michelin star | |
| Wils | Thomas Val | Dutch, European, Fusion | | | 2021-present | | — | 1 Michelin star | |
| Yamazato | Masanori Tomikawa | Japanese | | | 2002-present | | — | 1 Michelin star | |
| Zoldering | Tomas Bron | French | | | | | — | 1 Michelin star | |

== See also ==
- List of Michelin starred restaurants in the Netherlands
- List of restaurants in Rotterdam
- Dutch cuisine
