= Jan de Wit (disambiguation) =

Jan de Wit can refer to:

- Jan de Wit (born 1945), Dutch lawyer and politician
- Jan de Wit (chef), of restaurants De Trechter, De Nederlanden (restaurant), and Le Restaurant
- Jan de Wit, author of Anna Kournikova (computer virus)
