= Hotel Okura Amsterdam =

Hotel in Amsterdam, Netherlands

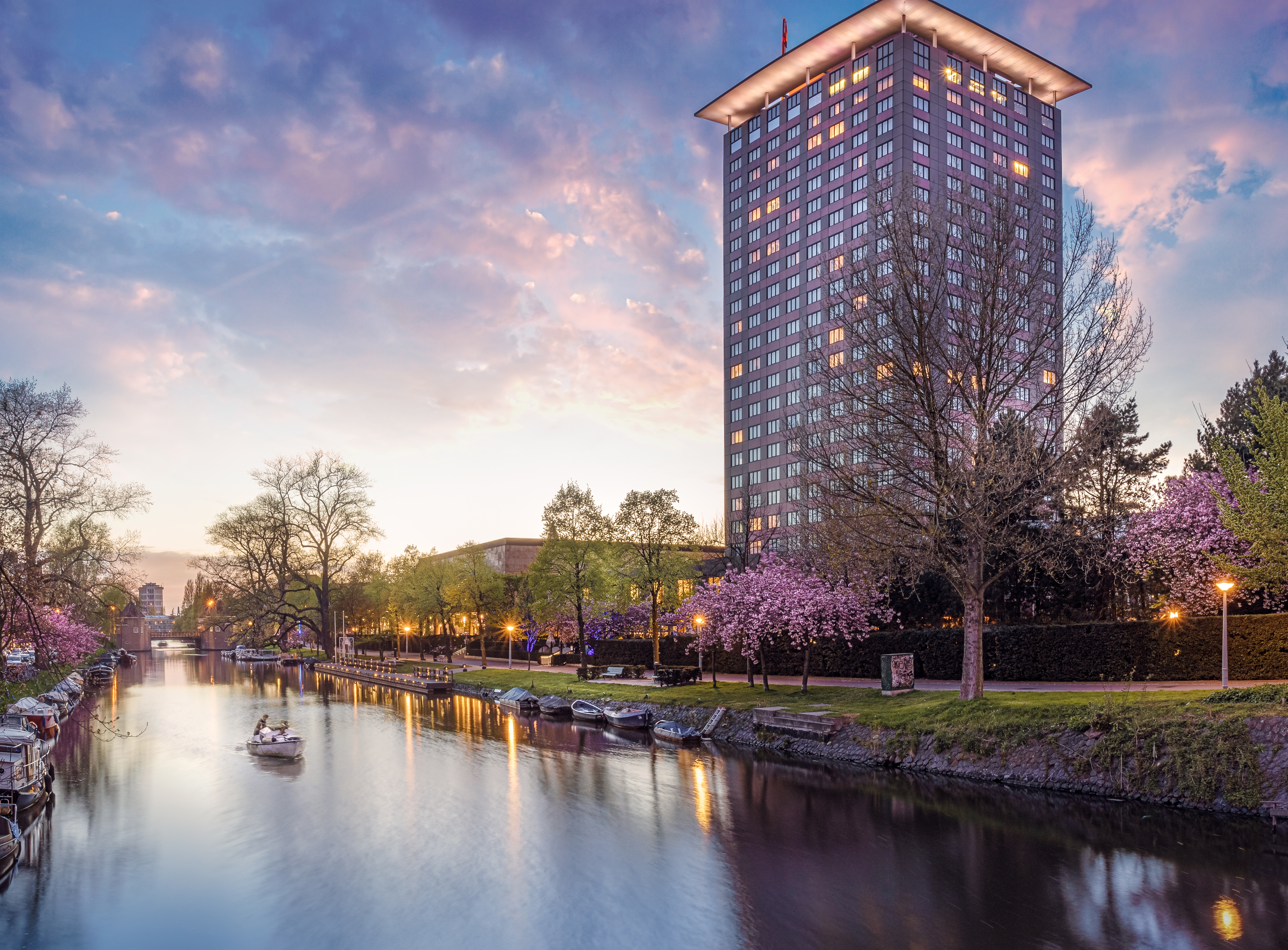
Hotel Okura

Hotel Okura Amsterdam is a hotel in Amsterdam that is part of the Japanese chain Okura Hotels & Resorts. The 23-floor building has a height of 78 metres, and was designed by Dutch architects Bernard Bijvoet and Gerard Holt and Japanese architects Yoshiro Taniguchi and Yozo Shibata. The hotel is located on the Ferdinand Bolstraat and the Jozef Israelskade near the Barbiersbrug over the Amstel Canal, and was opened in September 1971 by Prince Claus. Upon its completion/opening, Hotel Okura Amsterdam was the second tallest building in Amsterdam; only Tower Overhoeks in Amsterdam-Noord was even higher. The hotel was the first European hotel of the Okura hotel chain. It is a member of The Leading Hotels of the World.

== History ==
The building plot was located next to the location where the old RAI building, which was a temporary building, stood. Hendrik Petrus Berlage had once intended the location of the old RAI for the construction of a concert hall and public house. When an opera house was planned to be developed there in the 1970s, as part of the renovation of De Pijp, the neighbourhood protested under the slogan "Opera aan de Ferdinand Bolstraat? Sol-do-mi-terop". The plan was cancelled and the Japanese investors in the hotel complex demanded that the area be given a commercial use. Eventually, however, a sports centre, a kindergarten, and a care centre arose within the hotel site's vicinity.

== Restaurants ==
- Ciel Bleu, restaurant with two Michelin stars
- Yamazato, restaurant with one Michelin star. Serves the authentic Japanese kaiseki kitchen
- Sazanka, restaurant that had one Michelin star in the period 2015-2018. Serves the Teppanyaki kitchen
- Serre, restaurant with Bib Gourmand
