= Nikko Hotels =

Japanish hotel chain

Nikko Hotels International
- Native name: ニッコー・ホテルズ・インターナショナル
- Industry: Hospitality
- Founded: 1972
- Headquarters: Tokyo, Japan
- Area served: Worldwide
- Parent: Okura Nikko Hotel Management
- Website: okura-nikko.com/nikko

Nikko Hotels International (ニッコー・ホテルズ・インターナショナル, Nikkō Hoteruzu Intānashonaru) is an international hotel chain comprising Hotel Nikko (ホテル日航, Hoteru Nikkō) properties in Asia, Europe, North America, and the South Pacific. It is owned by Okura Nikko Hotel Management, a joint venture between Okura Hotels and Japan Airlines.

== History ==
Nikko Hotels International (NHI) began operations in 1972 as the global hotel brand of Japan Airlines, with its first property located in Jakarta. The first NHI-operated hotel in Japan opened in 1973. Other Nikko properties have been owned and operated by other entities; among the oldest Nikko properties is the Ginza Nikko, which opened in 1959.

Nikko Hotels International used to be owned by Japan Airlines Development Company Limited, which in the 1990s was renamed JAL Hotels. Following its acquisition in 2010, it became a subsidiary of Okura Hotels. Hotel Nikko affiliates include the Hotel Royal properties in Southeast Asia.

== Hotel locations ==
=== Japan ===
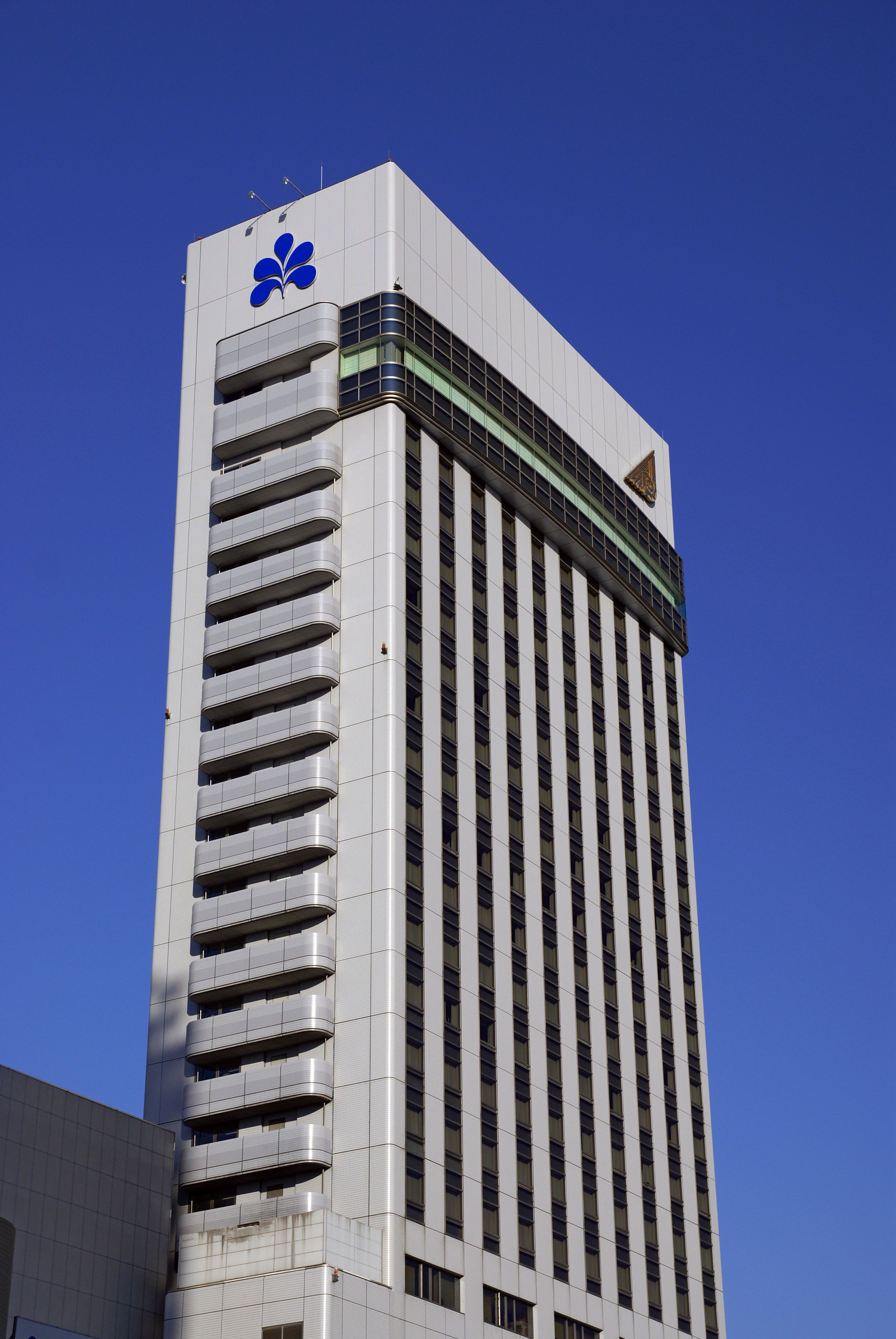
Hotel Nikko Kochi, located in Kochi, Japan

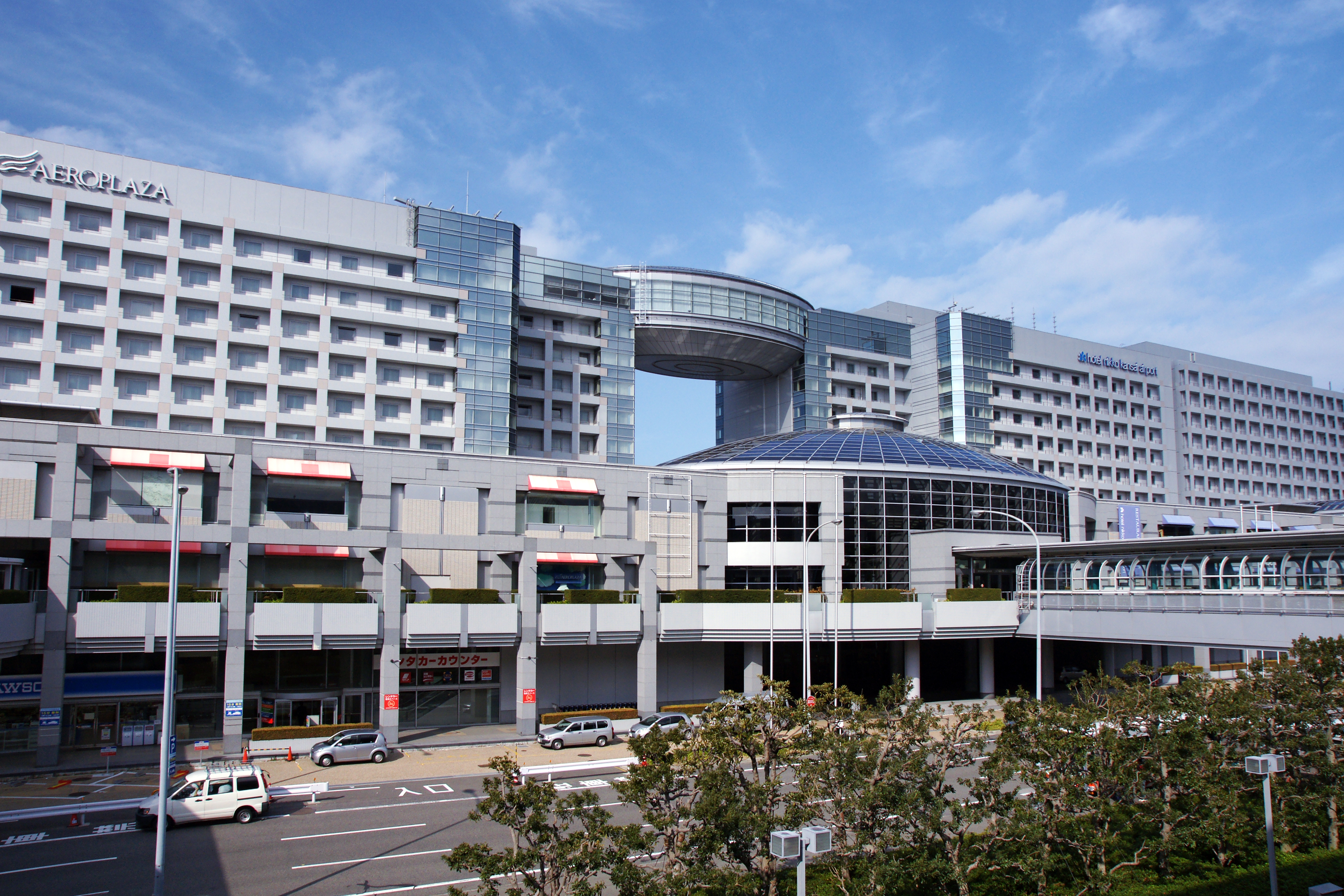
Hotel Nikko Kansai, located at Kansai International Airport

- JR Tower Hotel Nikko Sapporo, Hokkaido
- Hotel Nikko Northland Obihiro, Hokkaido
- Hotel Nikko Tsukuba, Ibaraki
- Grand Nikko Tokyo Bay Maihama, Chiba
- Hotel Nikko Narita, Chiba
- Grand Nikko Tokyo Daiba, Tokyo
- Hotel Nikko Tachikawa Tokyo, Tokyo
- Kawasaki Nikko Hotel, Kanagawa
- Hotel Nikko Niigata, Niigata
- Hotel Nikko Kanazawa, Ishikawa
- Nikko Style Nagoya, Aichi
- Hotel Nikko Princess Kyoto, Kyoto
- Hotel Nikko Osaka, Osaka
- Hotel Nikko Kansai Airport, Osaka
- Grand Nikko Awaji, Hyōgo
- Hotel Nikko Himeji, Hyōgo
- Hotel Nikko Nara, Nara
- Hotel Nikko Fukuoka, Fukuoka
- Hotel Nikko Huis Ten Bosch, Nagasaki
- Hotel Nikko Kumamoto, Kumamoto
- Hotel Nikko Ōita Oasis Tower, Ōita
- Hotel Nikko Alivila/Yomitan Resort, Okinawa

=== Asia-Pacific (outside Japan) ===
- Hotel Nikko Changshu, China
- Hotel Nikko Dalian, China
- Hotel Nikko Guangzhou, China
- Hotel Nikko New Century Beijing, China
- Hotel Nikko Shanghai, China
- Hotel Nikko Suzhou, China
- Hotel Nikko Taizhou, China
- Hotel Nikko Wuxi, China
- Hotel Nikko Xiamen, China
- Hotel Nikko Bali Benoa Beach, Indonesia
- Hotel Royal-Nikko Taipei, Taiwan
- Hotel Nikko Kaohsiung, Taiwan
- Hotel Nikko Bangkok, Thailand
- Hotel Nikko Amata Chonburi, Thailand
- Hotel Nikko Haiphong, Vietnam
- Hotel Nikko Saigon, Vietnam

=== Oceania ===
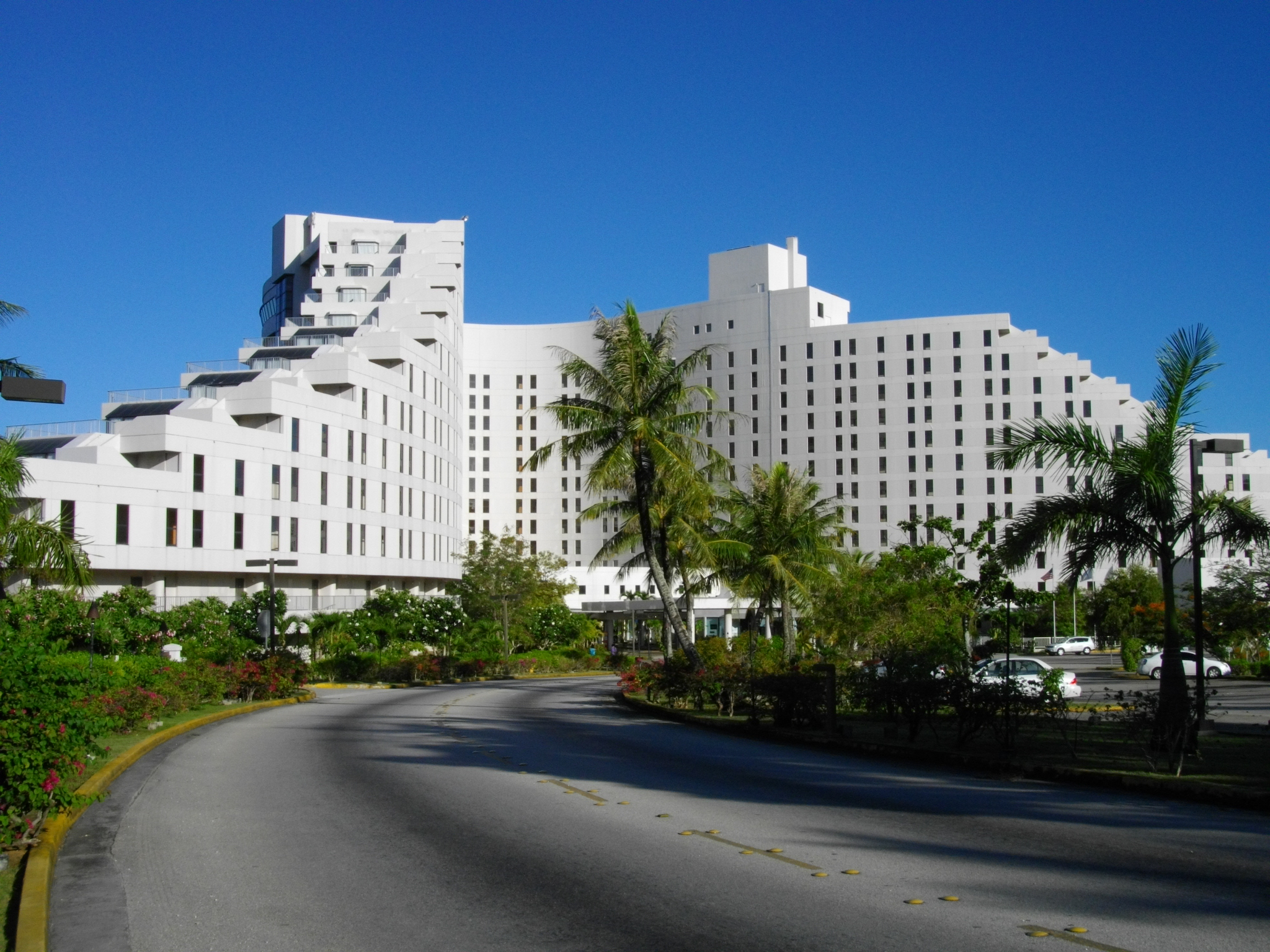
Hotel Nikko Guam, located at Tumon, Guam.

- Hotel Nikko Guam, Guam
- Palau Royal Resort, Palau

=== North America ===
- Hotel Nikko San Francisco, United States

== Upcoming properties ==
- Hotel Nikko Chengdu Yixin Lake, China (2024)

== Former properties ==
- Hotel Nikko Hong Kong, China (management terminated in June 2014, rebranded as New World Millennium Hong Kong)
- Hotel Nikko Tianjin, China
- Hôtel Nikko Paris, France (opening 1976 to 2003; rebranded as Hôtel Novotel Paris Tour Eiffel)
- Hotel Nikko Düsseldorf, Germany (management terminated in February 2022, rebranded as Clayton Hotel Düsseldorf)
- Grand Nikko Bali, Indonesia (management terminated in January 2017, rebranded as Hilton Bali Resort)
- Hotel Nikko Jakarta, Indonesia (management terminated in January 2012, rebranded as Pullman Jakarta Thamrin CBD)
- Hotel Nikko Kōchi, Japan (rebranded as Omo 7 Kochi)
- Hotel Nikko Kuala Lumpur, Malaysia (management terminated in November 2011, rebranded as InterContinental Kuala Lumpur)
- Hotel Nikko Manila Garden Makati City, Philippines (In 1995, Dusit International acquired the hotel and it was renamed the Dusit Hotel Nikko, Manila. Now, it is simply known as Dusit Thani Manila.
- Hotel Nikko Mexico City, Mexico (management terminated in May 2012, rebranded as Hyatt Regency Mexico City)
- Hotel Nikko Palau, Palau
- Hotel Nikko Hanoi, Vietnam (management terminated in December 2018, rebranded as Hotel du Parc Hanoi)
- Hotel Nikko Atlanta, United States (purchased by Hyatt Hotels February 1997 and rebranded as Grand Hyatt Atlanta)
- Hotel Nikko Singapore (management terminated prior to opening in 1985, rebranded as Glass Hotel and is now called Holiday Inn Atrium Singapore)
