= Hotel Nikko Guam =

Hotel in Tumon, Guam

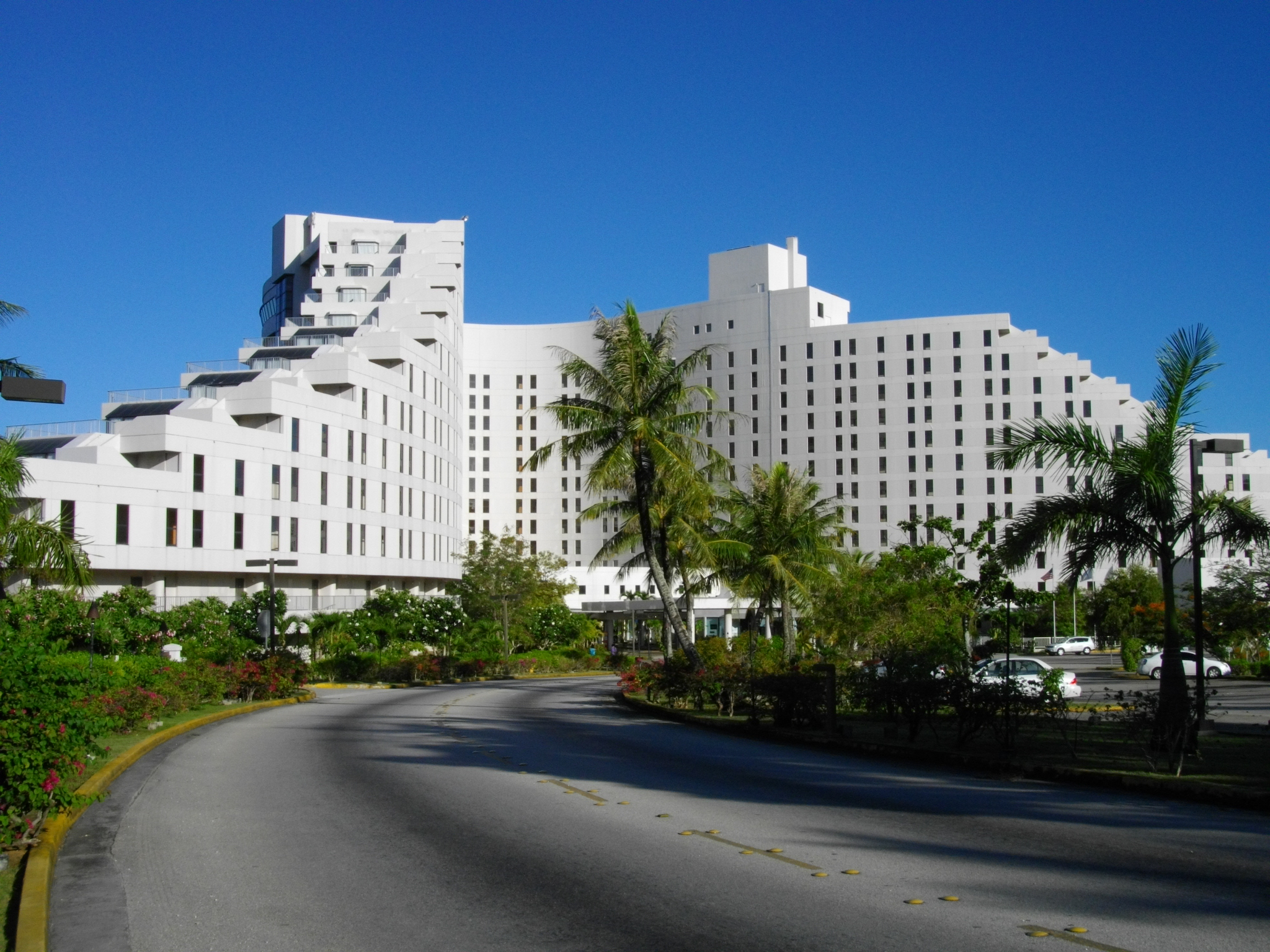
- Interactive map of the Hotel Nikko Guam area
- Hotel chain: Nikko Hotels International

General information
- Location: Tumon, Guam, 245 Gun Beach Road, Tumon, Guam 96913
- Coordinates: 13°31′18″N 144°48′16″E
- Operator: Hotel Nikko

Technical details
- Floor count: 15

Other information
- Number of rooms: 470

Website
- okura.com/guam/guam/hotel-nikko-guam/

Hotel Nikko Guam is a hotel in Tumon, Guam, operated by the Japanese hotelier firm Hotel Nikko. It is located at the northernmost end of Tumon Bay next to Gun Beach. The hotel has 470 rooms, all with private balconies and ocean views.
