= Hotel Nikko Kaohsiung =

Hotel in Qianzhen, Kaohsiung, Taiwan

Hotel Nikko Kaohsiung 高雄日航酒店
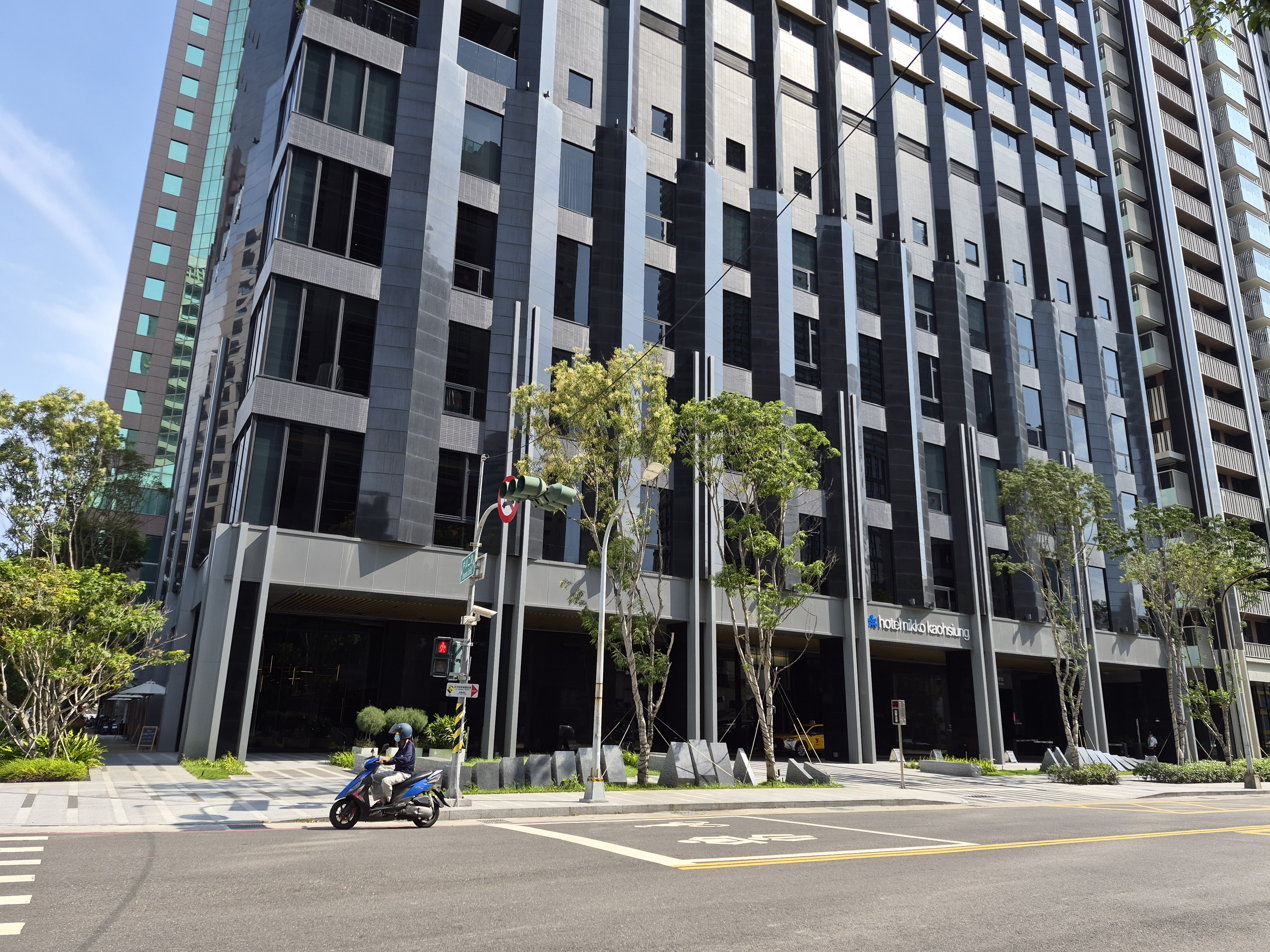
- Interactive map of the Hotel Nikko Kaohsiung 高雄日航酒店 area

General information
- Location: 268 Linsen 4th Rd., Qianzhen District. Kaohsiung, Taiwan
- Coordinates: 22°36′37″N 120°18′19″E
- Opening: November 2024
- Operator: Nikko Hotels

Technical details
- Floor count: 21 above ground 4 below ground
- Floor area: 27,300 m^{2} (294,000 sq ft)

Other information
- Number of rooms: 260

Website
- Hotel Nikko Kaohsiung Website

Hotel Nikko Kaohsiung (Chinese: 高雄日航酒店; pinyin: Gāoxióng Rìháng Jiǔdiàn) is a five star hotel located in Cianjhen District, Kaohsiung, Taiwan. The hotel opened in November 2024. Hotel Nikko Kaohsiung is the third property of Okura Nikko Hotels to open in Taiwan, following the opening of Hotel Royal Nikko Taipei (1984) and The Okura Prestige Taipei (2012).

== Location ==
The hotel is located at the heart of Kaohsiung's Asia New Bay Area, near Kaohsiung International Airport, Kaohsiung Main Station and Kaohsiung Exhibition Center. It is 4 minutes’ walk from Sanduo Shopping District metro station.

== Facilities ==
Hotel Nikko Kaohsiung is operated by Nikko Hotels and offers a total of 260 guest rooms and suites, spanning a total floor area of 27,300 m^{2} (294,000 sq ft) with 21 floors above ground and 4 below ground. It features a wide range of restaurants, including Japanese cuisine, Chinese cuisine and all-day dining, and a rooftop bar on the 21st floor where guests can enjoy views of Kaohsiung Harbor. The hotel's facilities aim to meet the diverse needs of guests staying for both business and leisure.

== See also ==
- Nikko Hotels
- InterContinental Kaohsiung
- Kaohsiung Marriott Hotel
