= Aquarium of Guam =

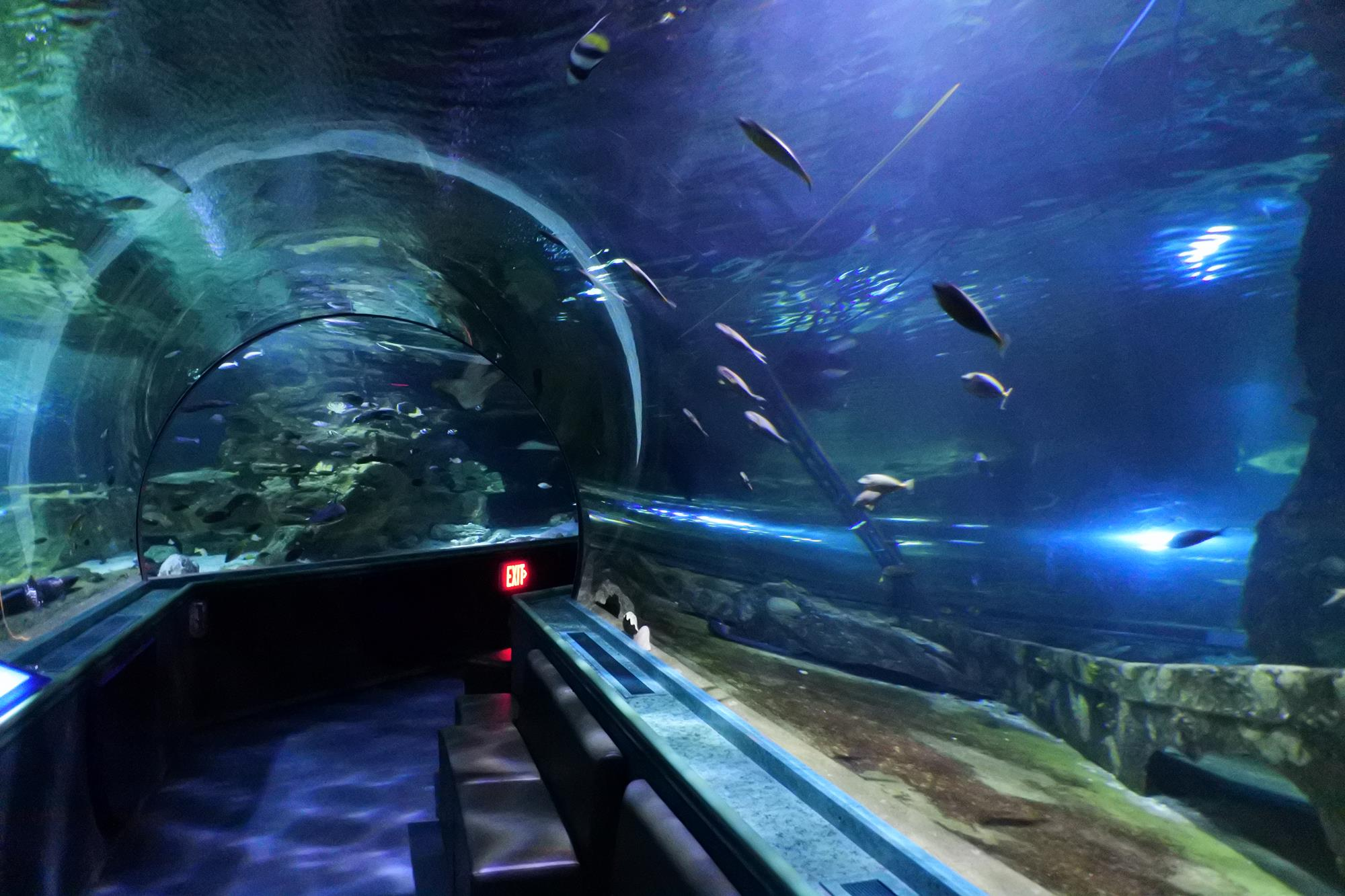
- Interactive map of Aquarium of Guam
- 13°30′53.99″N 144°48′21.50″E
- Date opened: 1999
- Location: Tumon, Guam
- No. of animals: 2000+
- No. of species: 80
- Total volume of tanks: More than 800,000 US gallons (3,000,000 L; 670,000 imp gal)
- Website: www.aquariumofguam.com

Aquarium of Guam (formerly UnderWater World Guam) is a public aquarium in Tumon, Guam. It features one of the longest tunnel-aquariums in the world and the only oceanarium in the United States territory of Guam. The aquarium is currently closed to the public while undergoing a major renovation and redevelopment.

== History ==
The aquarium opened in 1999 and has more than 2,000 animals representing more than 80 different species. Many of the animals included in the aquarium are native to Guam and the surrounding Marianas Islands.

In 2025, the aquarium closed to the public to undergo a major renovation and redevelopment. The project includes upgrades to visitor facilities, exhibits, and aquarium systems. The aquarium is expected to reopen following completion of the renovation.

The aquarium is slated to complete its renovations and reopen to the public in Spring 2027.

== Animals ==
Many of the animals at Underwater World Guam are found in the waters surrounding the 200-square-mile (520 km^{2}) island. The main tank features many large animals, including Grey reef shark, green sea turtle, Blacktip reef shark, Zebra shark, and Whiptail stingray. There is also an exhibit featuring four giant Moray eels. The gallery exhibits at Underwater World Guam are home to many unique animals, including Corals and an exhibit featuring fish that can change gender.

Since it opened, the aquarium has featured live shark feeds throughout the week. Scuba divers feed whitetip reef sharks, nurse sharks and zebra sharks, as well as the whiptail stingray and giant groupers by hand inside the main tank of the aquarium. The divers wear three sets of gloves including one cotton pair, a chainmail glove and one layer of Kevlar. The grey reef shark and blacktip reef shark population is fed from a floating platform above the main tank, as they are too dangerous and unpredictable to be fed by hand.

== Conservation efforts ==
The aquarium has supported conservation efforts on Guam since the facility opened. In addition to being one of the major sponsors of the International Coastal Cleanup the company also provides free presentations for schools regarding marine life and environmental issues on Guam. UnderWater World Guam also offers special rates for groups to attend field trips through the aquarium with a guided tour.
