= Hotel Nikko Düsseldorf =

German-Japanese hotel in Dusseldorf, Germany

- Hotel chain: Nikko Hotels

General information
- Status: Closed
- Location: Düsseldorf, Germany, Immermannstraße 41
- Coordinates: 51°13′22″N 6°47′20″E
- Opening: 1978
- Closed: 2022

Technical details
- Floor count: 11

Other information
- Number of rooms: 393
- Number of suites: 24
- Number of restaurants: 3

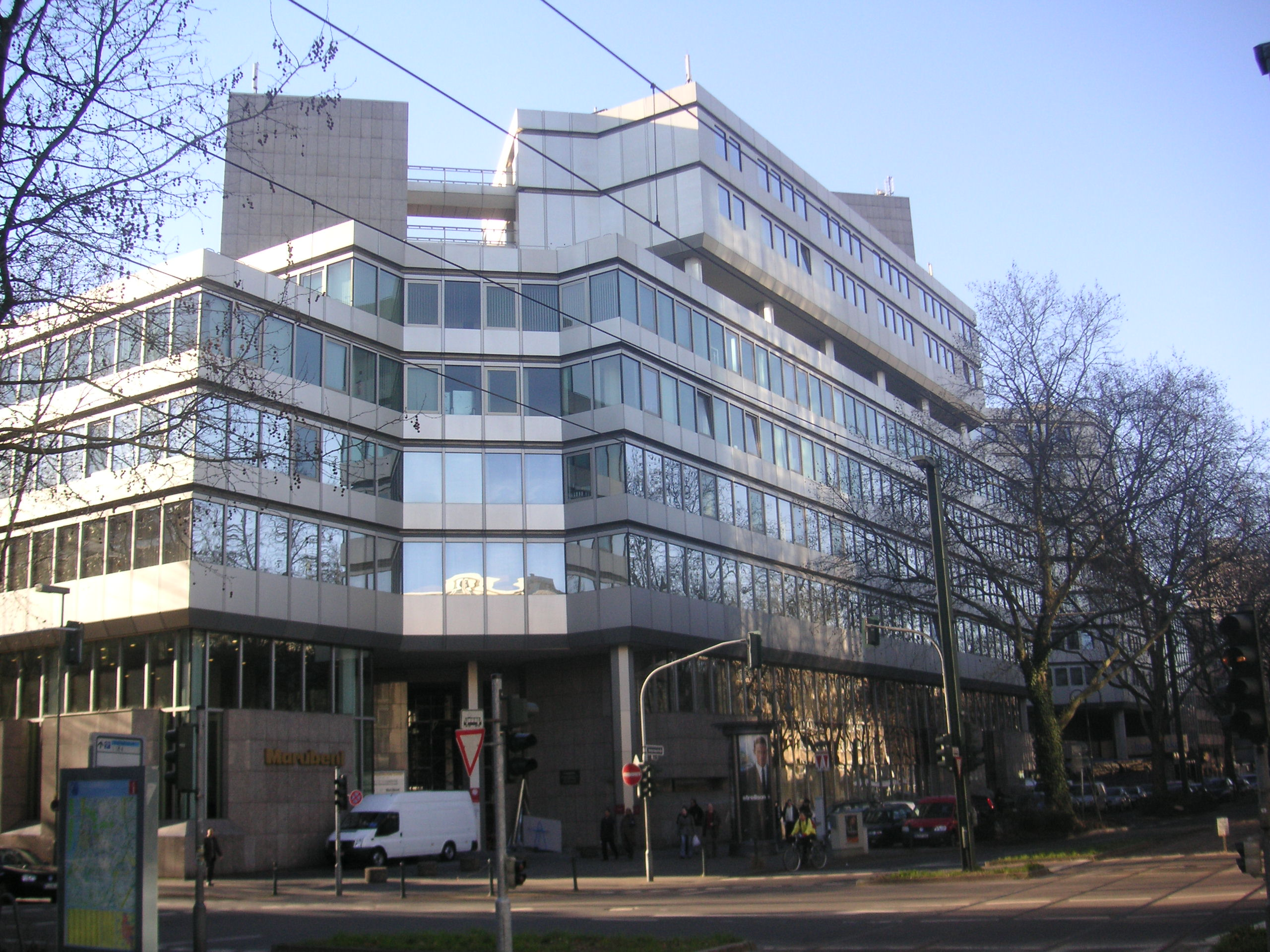
Japan Center Düsseldorf

The Hotel Nikko Düsseldorf (ホテル・ニッコー・デュッセルドルフ, Hoteru Nikkō Dyusserudorufu) was a German-Japanese hotel prominent in Düsseldorf since 1978. Located in the heart of Little Tokyo in Stadtmitte, the hotel opened in 1978 in conjunction with the German-Japanese Center. It has undergone one major expansion in 2009 which included a renovation of all rooms and the addition of a new wing with 42 executive rooms. A renovation of the spa and conference facilities has been done in 2013. In 2018 a complete renovation of 220 guest rooms, lobby, F&B, entrance and much more has been done. The hotel ceased to operate as Hotel Nikko in 2022 after being purchased by Dalata Hotel Group.

== History ==
The Hotel Nikko was the biggest hotel located in the center of Düsseldorf, with 393 rooms. It had three restaurants on the premises. The hotel was one of the Top 5 Hotels in Düsseldorf for business and leisure, and was very popular with Japanese travellers. Guests could experience authentic Japanese food in the lobby restaurant and enjoy the Teppanyaki restaurant as a live cooking show. The Nikko had Düsseldorf's only private tatami rooms, offering a unique dining experience for small groups. On the top level of the hotel was the famous Sky Spa with a view of the city skyline. In February 2022, the Irish Dalata Hotel Group purchased the hotel and rebranded.

The Hotel Nikko Düsseldorf was licensed by Okura Nikko Hotel Management (formerly JAL Hotels International Group) since the opening in 1978 until 2022. Due to the acquisition of the hotel by the Irish firm Dalata Hotel Group, the hotel was renamed in December 2022 to Clayton Hotel Düsseldorf.

== See also ==
- Japanese community of Düsseldorf
