= Ciel Bleu =

Coordinates: 52°20′55.24″N 4°53′38.16″E

- Interactive map of Ciel Bleu

Restaurant information
- Head chef: Arjan Speelman
- Food type: French
- Rating: Michelin Guide
- Location: Ferdinand Bolstraat 333, Amsterdam, 1072 LH, Netherlands
- Seating capacity: 70
- Website: Official website

Ciel Bleu is a restaurant located in the Okura Hotel, a five-star hotel, in Amsterdam, Netherlands. It is a fine dining restaurant and was awarded one Michelin star from 2005 to 2007 and two Michelin stars from 2008 to present. GaultMillau awarded the restaurant 19.0 out of 20 points.

Ciel Bleu is a member of the Alliance Gastronomique Néerlandaise.

The name "Ciel Bleu" ("Blue Sky" in French) refers to the restaurant's location on the 23rd floor of the Okura Hotel. From this height, the sky surrounds the restaurant.

Another one star restaurant, Yamazato, is also located in the hotel.

== See also ==
- List of Michelin starred restaurants in the Netherlands
