= De Kas =

Amsterdam restaurant

De Kas is a Dutch farm-to-table restaurant in Amsterdam, Netherlands. The restaurant has a Michelin star.

== See also ==
- List of restaurants in Amsterdam
