= Okura Nikko Hotel Management =

Japanese hotel management firm

Okura Nikko Hotel Management Co., Ltd.
- Company type: Hotels
- Industry: Hospitality
- Founded: 1970
- Headquarters: Shinagawa, Tokyo, Japan
- Area served: International
- Key people: Marcel P. van Aelst (President)
- Products: Hotels
- Parent: Okura Hotels
- Divisions: Okura Hotels & Resorts; Hotel JAL City; Nikko Hotels
- Website: www.okura-nikko.com

Okura Nikko Hotel Management Co., Ltd. (formerly JAL Hotels Company Ltd.) is a Japanese-owned global hotel management firm, majority owned by Hotel Okura Co., Ltd. since 2010. The hotel firm's managed properties are marketed under the Okura Hotels & Resorts and Hotel JAL City and Nikko Hotels International groups. From its time as a subsidiary of Japan Airlines (JAL), its headquarters have been located in the JAL Building in Shinagawa, Tokyo, Japan. In 2010, Japan Airlines sold majority ownership of JAL Hotels to the Hotel Okura, which is now the primary shareholder.

== History ==
JAL Hotels has been a hotel management company since its establishment in 1970 as a subsidiary of Japan Airlines Co. Ltd.

On July 1, 1996, Japan Airlines Development Ltd. was renamed to "JAL Hotels Company Ltd." to further establish its business description as a hotel operator. On April 1, 1999, a merger with "Japan Airlines Hotel Co., Ltd." resulted in JAL Hotels taking over the management of the "Ginza Nikko Hotel" and "Kawasaki Nikko Hotel".

On September 30, 2010, the sale of JAL Hotels to Hotel Okura Co., Ltd. resulted in JAL Hotels becoming mainly owned by Hotel Okura, which holds 79.6% shares in the company, while Japan Airlines retains 11.1%; with 9.3% held by banks, other investors. The company renamed itself as Okura Nikko Hotel Management Co., Ltd. on 1 October 2015.

== Brands ==
Operating under the "Okura Hotels & Resorts", "Hotel JAL City" and "Nikko Hotels International" groups, JAL Hotels has managed 67 properties worldwide, with a total inventory of 21,406 guest rooms. Since 2010, its acquisition by Hotel Okura has increased the total guest rooms networked. As of today, it has 86 properties (opened or announced), including 50 in Japan, 11 in China and 25 in the rest of Asia and other countries.

== Notable properties ==
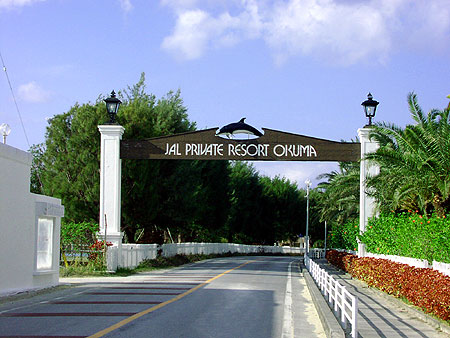
JAL Private Resort Okuma

- Grand Nikko Tokyo Daiba
- Hotel JAL City Haneda Tokyo
- Hotel Nikko San Francisco
- Hotel Nikko Düsseldorf (management terminated in February 2022, rebranded as Clayton Hotel Düsseldorf)
- Hotel Nikko Saigon
- Hotel Nikko Bali Benoa Beach
- Hotel Nikko Kluang
- Hotel Nikko Hai Phong
- Hotel Nikko Kaohsiung

== See also ==
- List of Nikko Hotels
