= Tumon, Guam =

Census-designated place of Guam

Tumon Tomhom
- Census-designated place
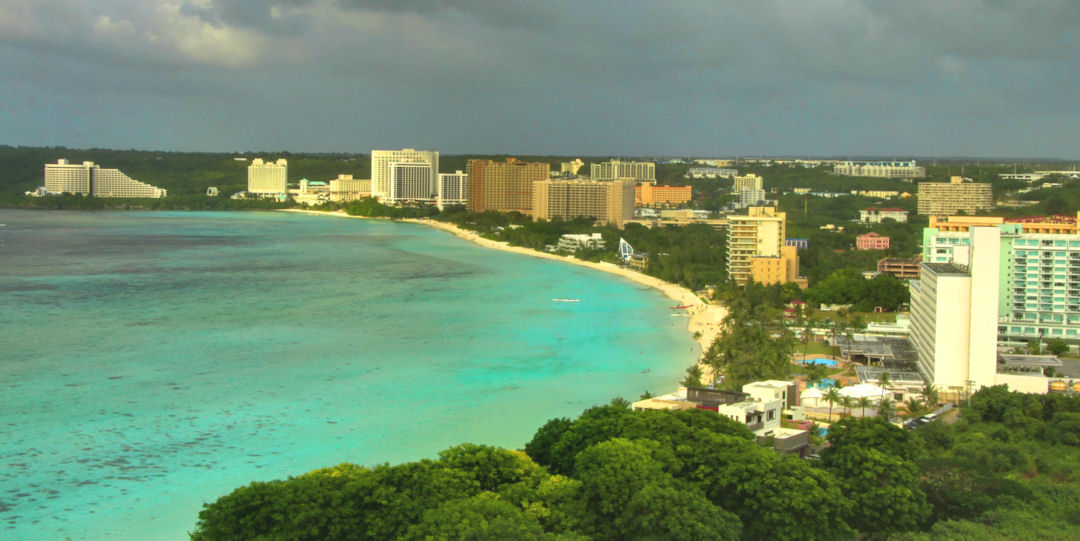
- Tumon Bay from the south

- Location in Guam
- Coordinates: 13.5173°N 144.8074°E
- Country: USA
- Territory: Guam
- Village: Tamuning
- Time zone: UTC+10:00 (ChST)
- ZIP code: 96913
- Area code: 671

Tumon (Chamorro: Tomhom) is a census-designated place located on Tumon Bay along the northwest coast of the United States unincorporated territory of Guam. Located in the village of Tamuning, it is the center of Guam's tourist industry.

== History ==
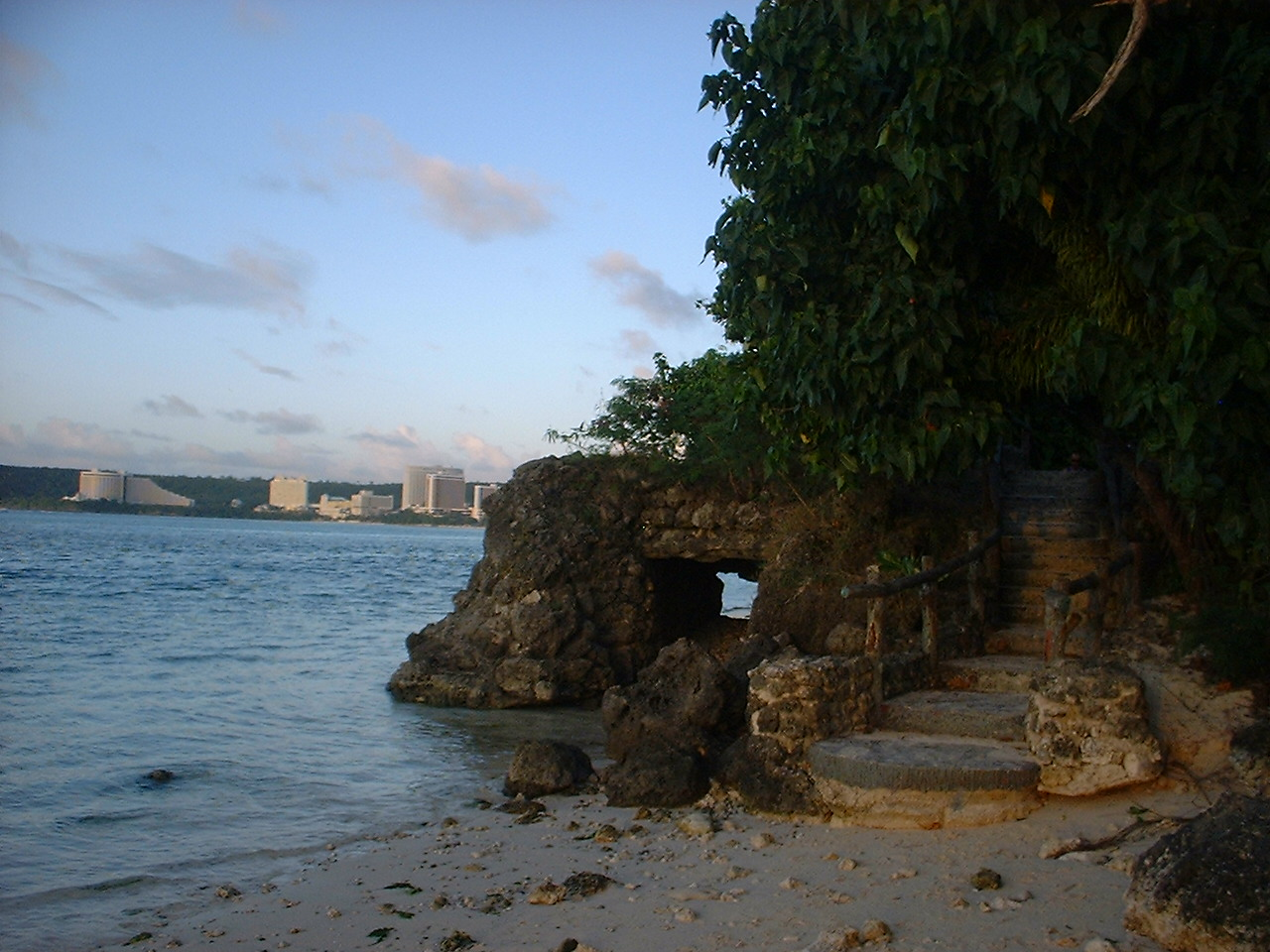
A defensive fortification built into coastal rock during the Japanese occupation of Guam

Tumon Bay or Agana Bay are the most likely locations that Ferdinand Magellan dropped anchor on March 6, 1521, though there was little further contact for the next 150 years. When the Spanish Empire colonized Guam in 1668, Tomhom was one of the most prominent villages. The first Roman Catholic missionaries to the island, the Jesuit Padre (Pålé), the Spanish priest Blessed Diego Luis de San Vitores and his sacristan, the Visayan Saint Pedro Calungsod were killed in Tumon by the village chief Matå'pang after San Vitores had baptised the chief's daughter without permission, but with mother's permission. This was an early inciting incident of the Spanish-Chamorro Wars. A park and statue mark the site of De San Vitores and Calungsod's martyrdom along the beach, while a nearby Catholic parish church dedicated to De San Vitores lies along Tumon's main road, which was also named in his honor.

A small tunnel through a large rock on the tourist beach overlooking the bay was part of the defensive positions prepared by the Japanese occupiers during World War II. The American forces landed in a different location during the 1944 Battle of Guam and the Tumon defenses were not tested.

Today, dozens of hotels in addition to shopping centers, water parks, night clubs, and other attractions can be found along the sandy beaches of Tumon Bay, which was recently made a marine preserve. Tumon is served by Antonio B. Won Pat International Airport in Tamuning.

== Politics ==
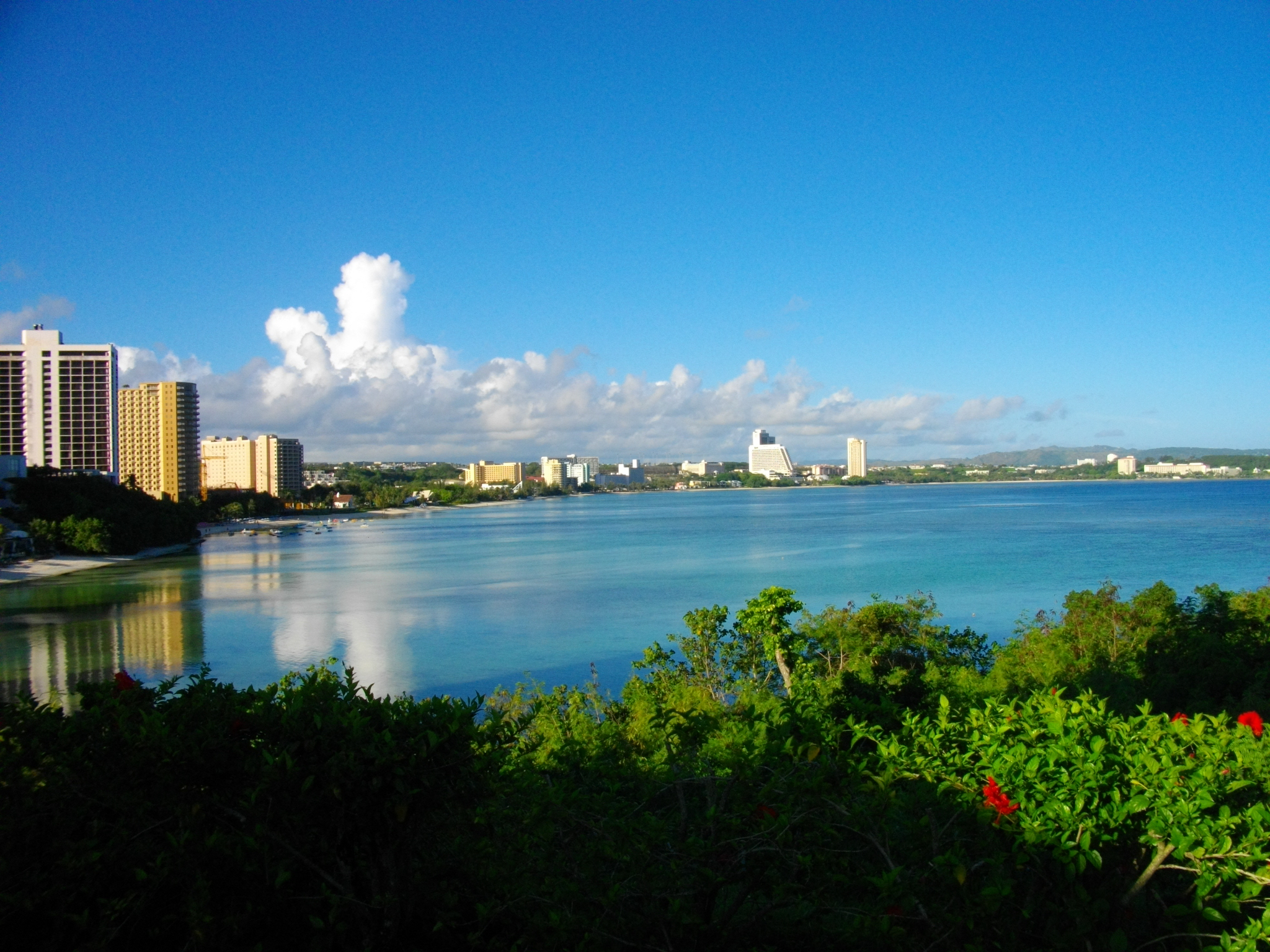
Tumon Bay and Hotel Row, 2010

As the center of Guam's tourist industry, Tumon often has issues that lead to political debates. A recurring one concerns whether adult entertainment businesses should remain in the area. Another involves propositions to legalize gambling on Guam which would lead to casinos in the area. Due to the area's economic importance, extensive public works projects often take place in Tumon leading some politicians to be both applauded and criticized for the disproportionate funding given the region. Tumon is part of the municipality of Tamuning-Tumon-Harmon, which is governed by an elected mayor.

The Guam Department of Public Works and Guam Department of Land Management are located in Upper Tumon.

== Transportation and communications ==
The main source of public transportation in the district is through the bus or taxi service, while Antonio B. Won Pat International Airport is located in neighbouring Barrigada to the southeast.

The Guam Telephone Authority also operates in the area. Most of the island is powered through power poles; however, Tumon is the only village on the island to have underground power lines.

== Economy ==
Tumon is Guam's economic center. Tourism makes up more than half the economy of the island. Tourists flock to the shopping centers each day to local malls and shopping centers in the area. In 2005, the Guam Visitors Bureau recorded that over 1.2 million visitors visited the island that year.

== Shopping ==
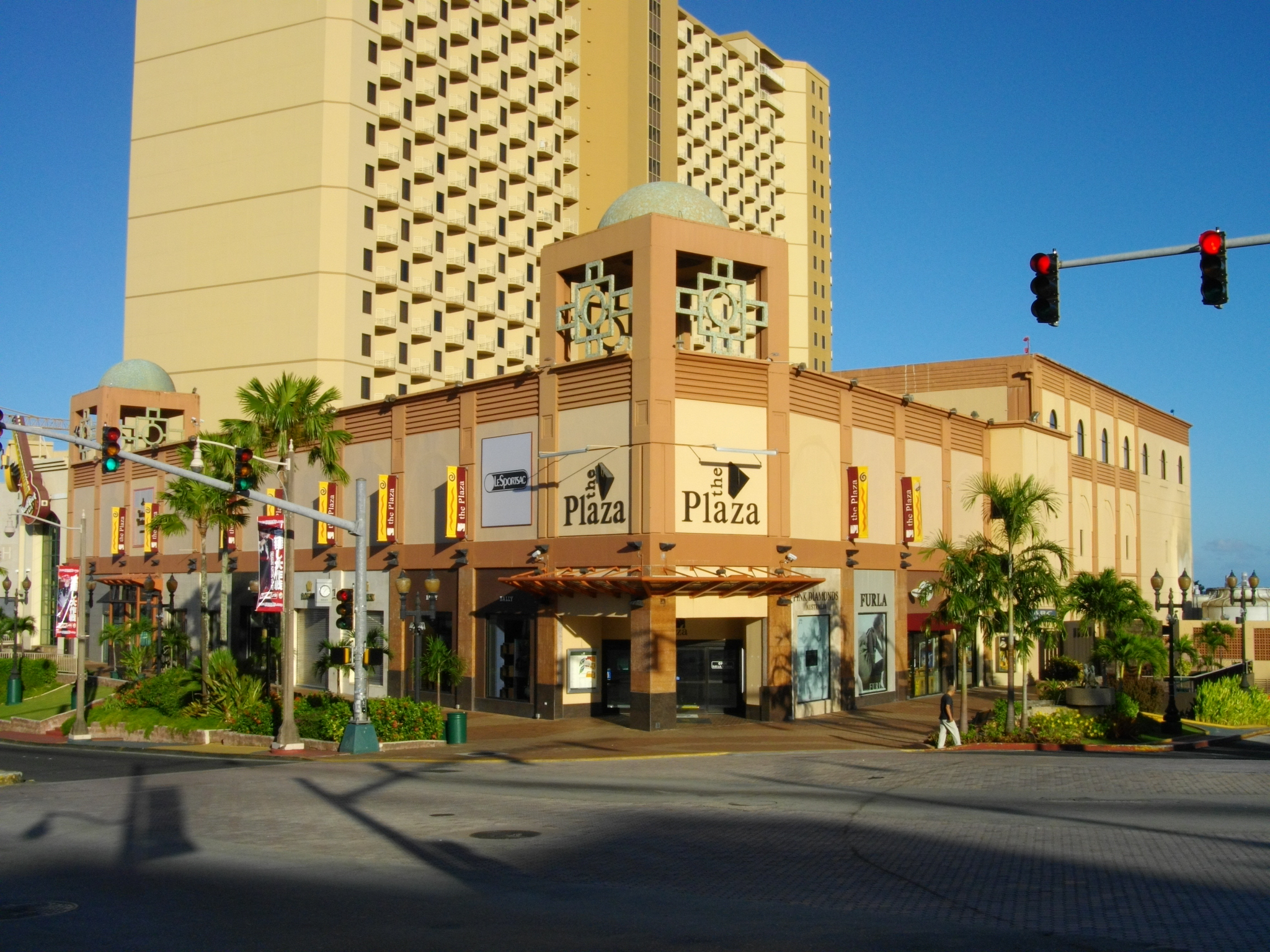
The Plaza shopping center

Tumon, as Guam's premier shopping district, has many malls and shopping arcades to choose from such as:

- Duty Free Galleria (DFS)
- Acanta Mall
- Tumon Sands Plaza
- The Plaza
- JP Superstore

Because of all the luxury shops and midscale stores in the city, Tumon is often called "the Paris of the Pacific".

== Activities ==
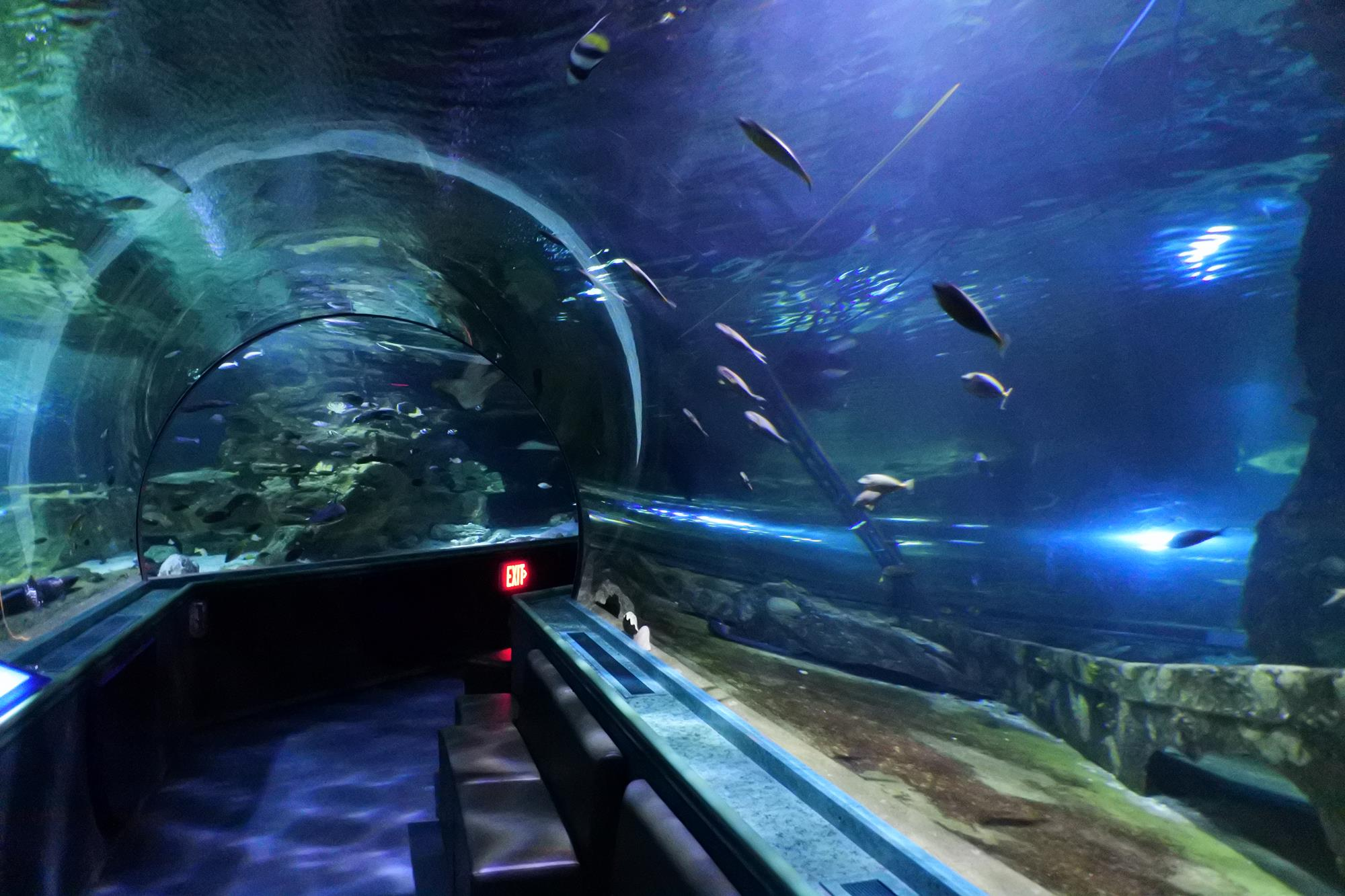
Tunnel aquarium in Tumon

Tourists flock to the beaches of Tumon Bay to enjoy the clear water and a day full of activities. Popular attractions include shopping. The central area of Hotel Row is home to the largest tunnel aquarium in the world, an attraction known as the Daring Sling Shot (riders are strapped into a ball that is shot upward on a wire and brought back down), and the popular Magic on Ice Show at the Sand Castle. Now Tumon is viewed by some as a "mini-Waikiki", with Hawaiian style fire dances. There are also many Chamorro shows available.

The beaches in Tumon are all wildlife preserves. Fishing is allowed in certain areas, but fishers must stand on the beach to cast their nets or fishing lines. Walking into the water to fish is illegal.

One big Tourist Shopping location is Micronesia Mall, which has expanded and added a food court and a Macy's as the sole anchor store. Another big shopping location is a 24-hour Kmart, which is as big as any standard Kmart on the mainland US. Parking is frequently full and there is parking on the roof. Both Micronesia Mall and Kmart are off Hotel Row, with buses frequently running between the shops and the hotels.

== Nightlife and entertainment ==
Tumon has many dance clubs, several strip clubs and much more to offer. The largest dance center in the city is The Globe. The Sandcastle is a Las Vegas-style attraction, with magic shows featuring tigers, flamingos and other exotic animals.

There is currently a debate in the area on the subject of "adult entertainment". Some contend the strip clubs bring in much needed tourist dollars, while others believe they scare away families.

== Education ==
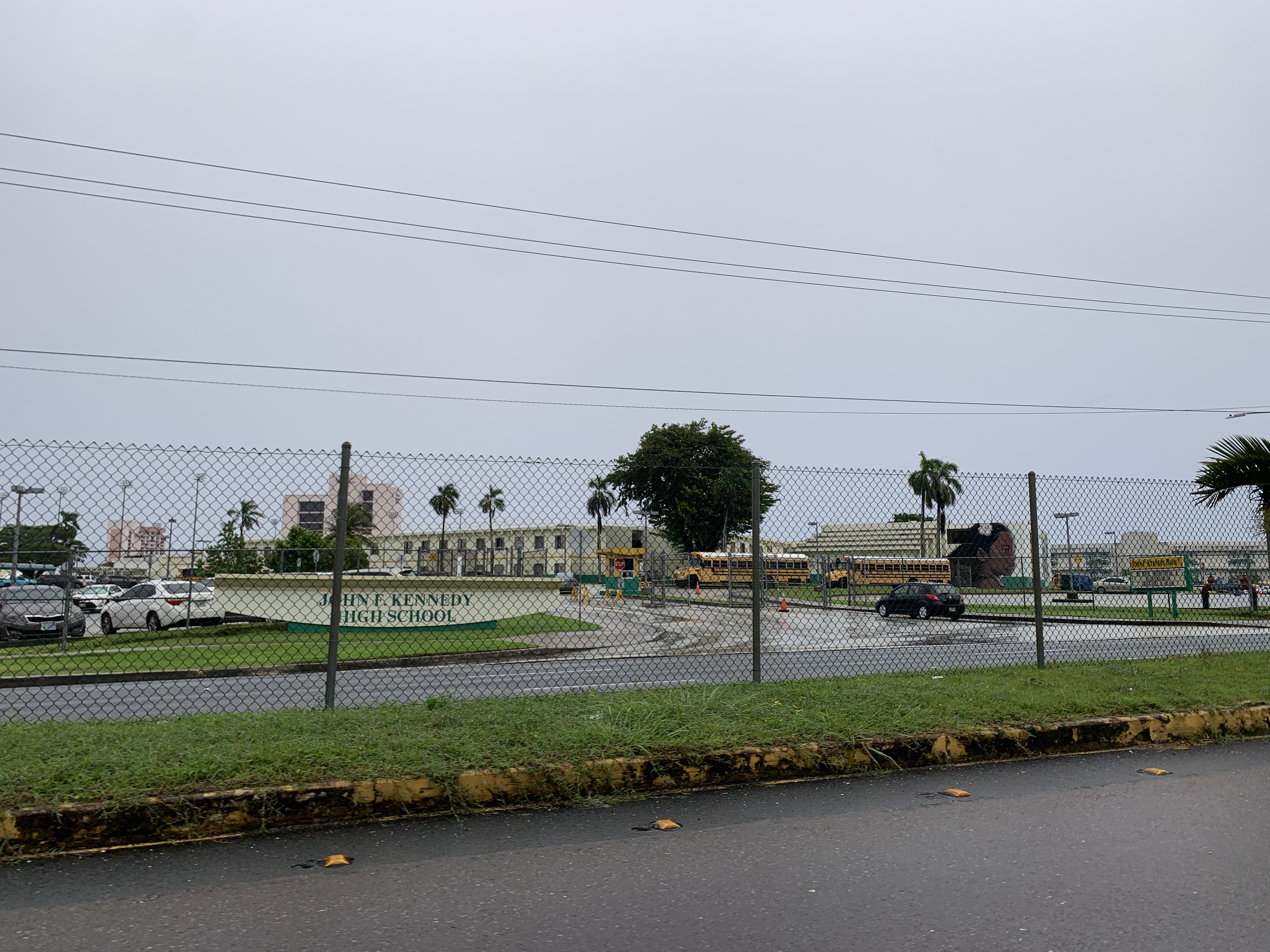
John F. Kennedy High School

Guam Public School System serves the island. Currently only two Guam public schools serve the village of Tumon. They are John F. Kennedy High School and Chief Brodie Elementary.

In regards to the Department of Defense Education Activity (DoDEA), Tumon is in the school transportation zone for Andersen Elementary and Andersen Middle School, while Guam High School is the island's sole DoDEA high school.

== Northern Tumon ==
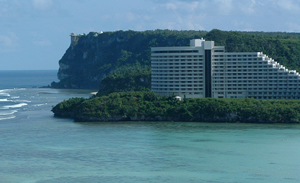
Two Lovers Point can be seen from all of Tumon.

The northern part of Tumon Bay is the busiest and the most populous part of the Tumon Bay districts. Most of the hotels in Tumon are located in this area, including Hotel Nikko Guam, Okura, Westin, Ohana Bayview, Ohana Oceanview, Tumon Bay Capitol, Outrigger, Hyatt, and Pia Marine. This section is also expecting an economic boom due to the arrival of the US military. Many new tall high-rise buildings are being constructed over the next few years, including infrastructure upgrades and an addition of many new shopping centers.

Many of the new high-rises in the northern Tumon area include, the Bayview 5, The Two Lovers Point Towers, a high-rise near the Westin, the Baldyga shopping center, the expansion of Underwater world and more projects expected to go up soon.

== Notable people ==
- James Moylan, U.S. delegate and former Guam legislator

== See also ==
- Villages of Guam
- UnderWater World Guam

== External links and references ==
- Guam Visitors Bureau
- Tumon Bay at Guam Portal
- Rogers, Robert F (1995). Destiny's Landfall: A History of Guam: University of Hawai'i Press. ISBN 0-8248-1678-1
- Report: Dredging information about Tumon Beach - Guam Environmental Protection Agency. September 2000.
- Tumon Bay Dredging
- Hotels and Resorts in Tumon Bay at Guam Review

Specific
