= Outrigger canoeing at the 1999 South Pacific Games =

Outrigger Canoeing at the 1999 South Pacific Games
- Location: Tahiti

Outrigger canoeing at the 1999 South Pacific Games was held from 5–10 June 1999 at Matapang Beach, Tumon Bay in Guam. There were six events for the "Galaide II" OC6 canoe (G6) and four events for the Va'a 1 rudderless OC1 (V1). Tahiti dominated the competition winning all ten gold medals.

== Medal summary ==
=== Medal table ===
Rank	Nation	Gold	Silver	Bronze	Total
1	French Polynesia (TAH)	10	0	0	10
2	New Caledonia (NCL)	0	7	2	9
3	Wallis and Futuna (WLF)	0	3	2	5
4	Fiji (FIJ)	0	0	5	5
5	Guam (GUM)	0	0	1	1
Totals (5 entries)		10	10	10	30

=== Men's Results ===
Event	Gold		Silver		Bronze	
G6 500m	Tahiti	1:52.06	Wallis and Futuna	1:53.60	Fiji	1:54.95
G6 1000m	Tahiti	4:21.49	Wallis and Futuna	4:24.93	New Caledonia	4:35.69
G6 2500m	Tahiti	12:05.12	New Caledonia	12:23.85	Wallis and Futuna	13:17.06
V1 250m	Tahiti	1:03.23	New Caledonia	1:09.95	Wallis and Futuna	1:11.74
V1 500m	Tahiti	2:13.35	Wallis and Futuna	2:21.03	New Caledonia	2.33.3

=== Women's Results ===
Event	Gold		Silver		Bronze	
G6 500m	Tahiti	2:28.73	New Caledonia	2:38.74	Fiji	2:38.80
G6 1000m	Tahiti	5:12.81	New Caledonia	5:24.34	Fiji	5:47.85
G6 2500m	Tahiti	14:29.31	New Caledonia	14:49.74	Guam	15:15.20
V1 250m	Tahiti	1:23.99	New Caledonia	1:24.94	Fiji	1:29.45
V1 500m	Tahiti	2:47.48	New Caledonia	2:52.18	Fiji	3:02.93

== Participating countries ==
Eight countries were entered in the outrigger canoeing events at the 1999 Games:

- Fiji
- Guam
- (Federated States of Micronesia) Micronesia
- New Caledonia
- Northern Marianas
- Palau
- Tahiti
- Wallis and Futuna
