= Hotel Nikko San Francisco =

Hotel in San Francisco, California

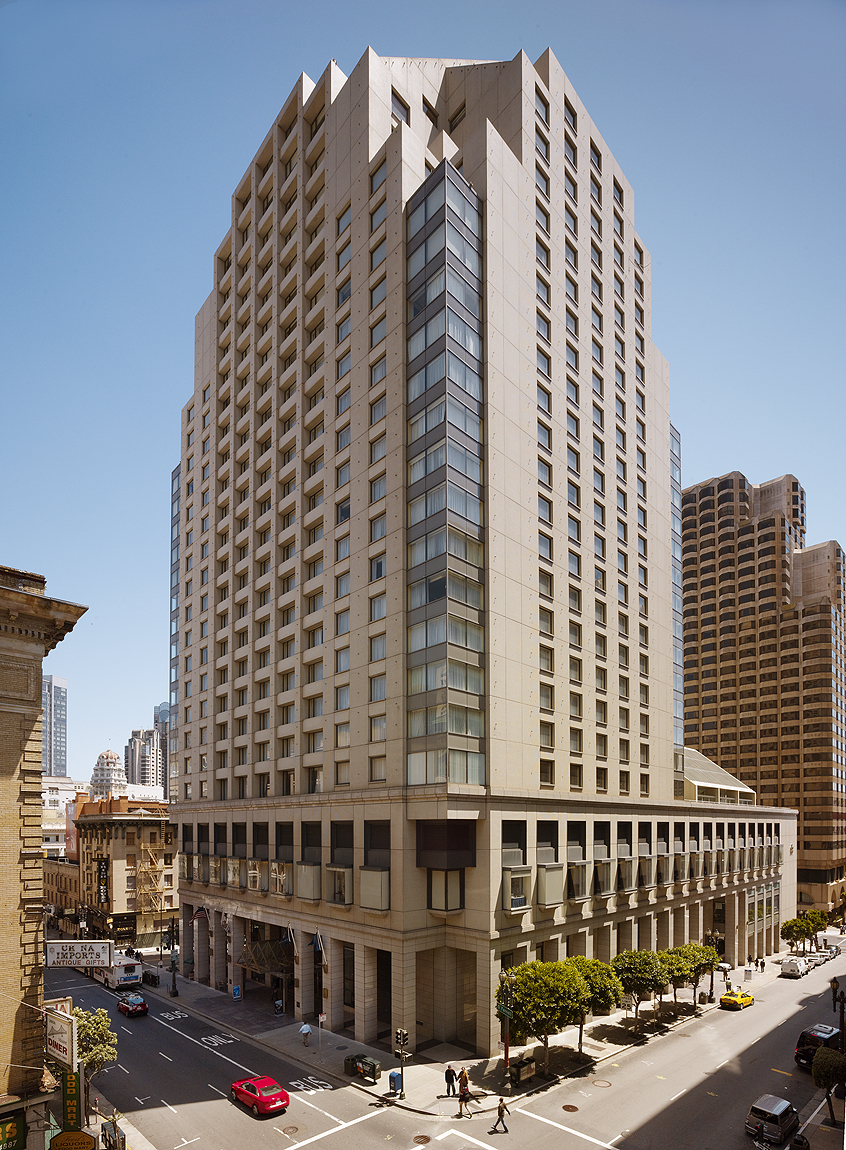

- Location within San Francisco
- Hotel chain: Nikko Hotels International, Preferred Hotels & Resorts

General information
- Location: United States, 222 Mason Street; San Francisco, California
- Coordinates: 37.7858°N 122.4093°W
- Opening: October 1987
- Owner: DATAM, LLC.
- Operator: Nikko Hotels

Height
- Height: 90 m (295 ft)

Technical details
- Floor count: 28

Design and construction
- Architects: AMTAD, Inc. Whisler-Patri Architects

Other information
- Number of rooms: 533
- Number of suites: 22
- Number of restaurants: Restaurant ANZU; Kanpai; Feinstein's at the Nikko
- Parking: (valet only)

Hotel Nikko San Francisco is a high-rise hotel at 222 Mason Street near Union Square, San Francisco, California. The 90 m (295 ft) 28-story hotel has 532 hotel rooms, and is owned by DATAM, LLC. and operated by Nikko Hotels. The hotel is one block away from Union Square, San Francisco and five blocks from the Moscone Center. The hotel opened in October 1987.

== History ==
The Takenaka Corporation developed Hotel Nikko San Francisco.

== Property ==
The hotel was designed by AMTAD, Inc. and Whisler- Patri Architects and built by Takenaka. It underwent a $60 million renovation commemorating from December 2016 to March 2017, during which time the hotel was closed. The renovation was led by Hirsch Bedner Associates.

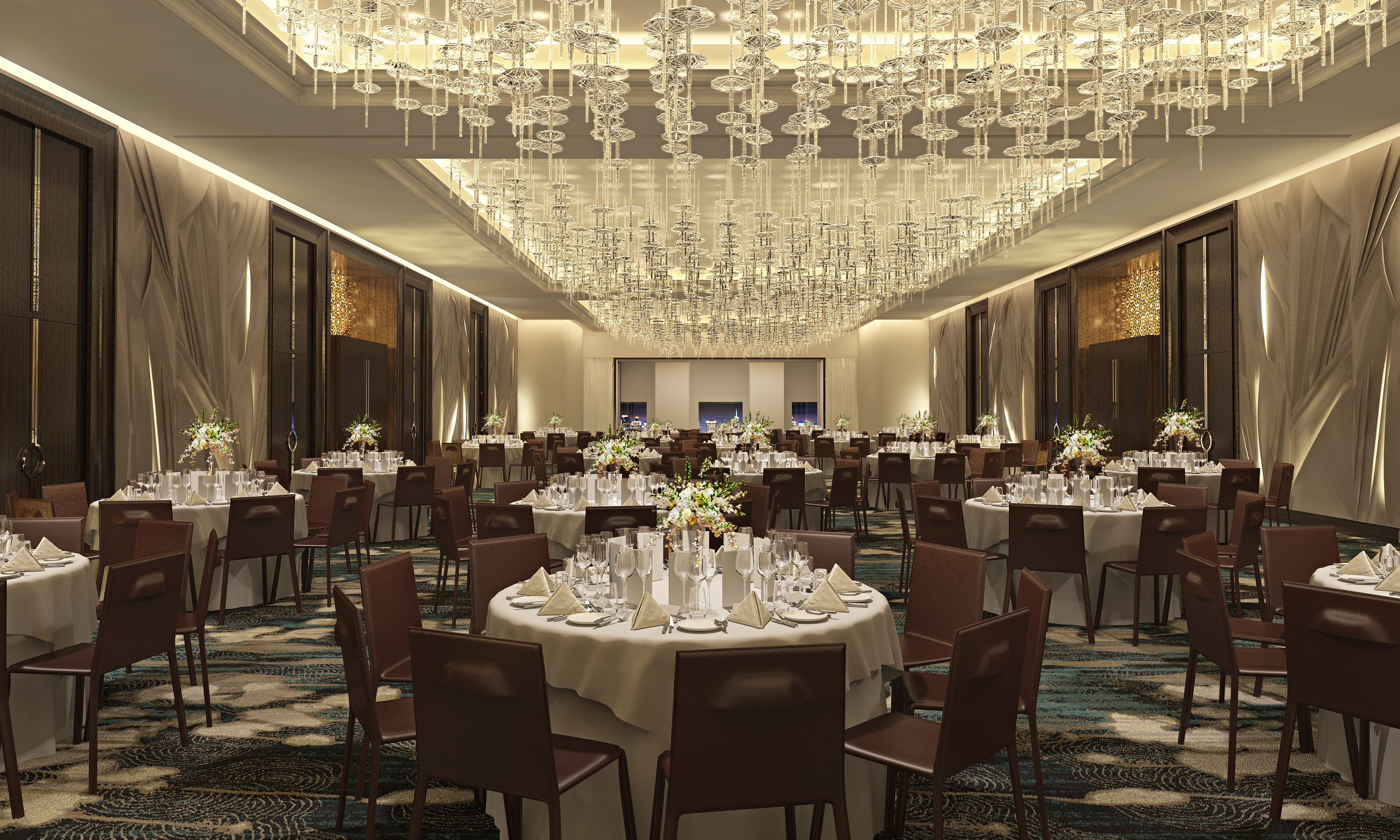
Ballroom

The hotel has 16 guest floors, 11 elevators, a health club, swimming pool, spa, lounge, cabaret room, and a restaurant. Restaurant ANZU is located on the second floor and is visible from the lobby. ANZU is overseen by Hotel Nikko's Food and Beverage Director, Chef Philippe Striffeler.
