= Hotel Nikko Palau =

Hotel in Palau

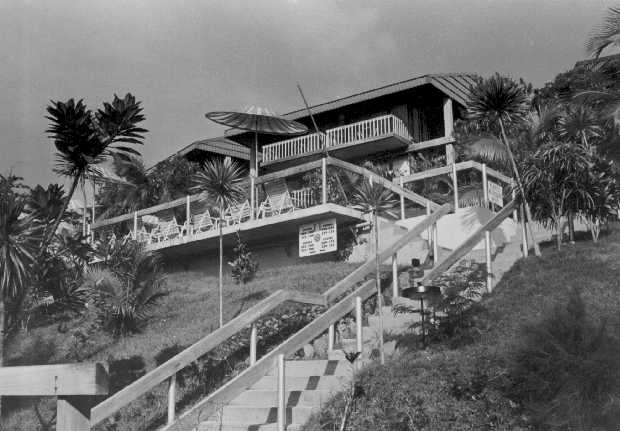
- Interactive map of the Hotel Nikko Palau area

General information
- Location: Palau
- Coordinates: 7.339°N 134.4971°E
- Operator: Hotel Nikko

Palau Royal Resort, formerly known as Hotel Nikko Palau, is a 5-star hotel in Palau. It is operated by Nikko Hotels.

It is one of the oldest hotels in Palau.
