= The Okura Prestige Taipei =

Hotel in Zhongshan, Taipei, Taiwan

- 台北大倉久和大飯店
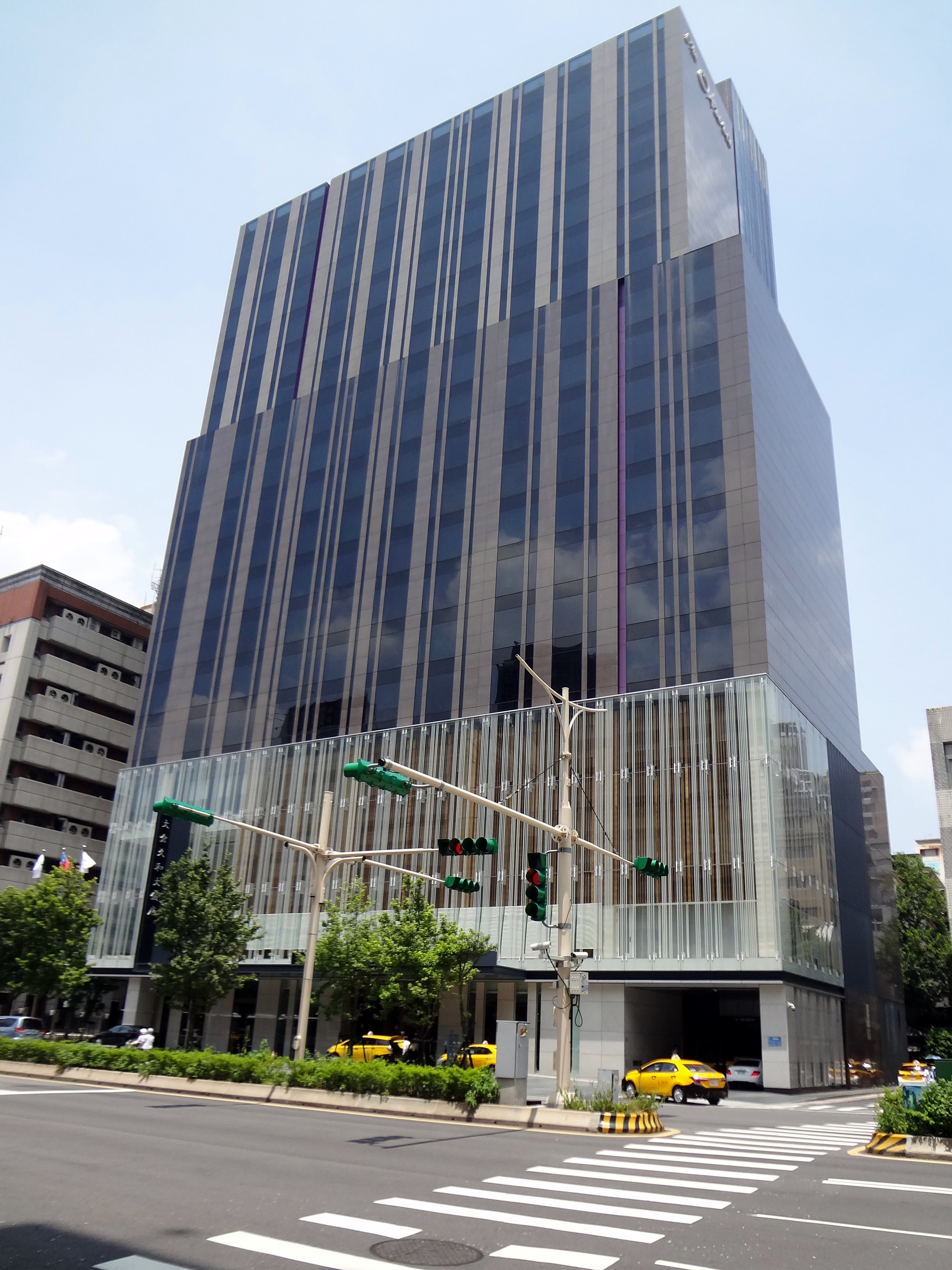
- Interactive map of the The Okura Prestige Taipei area

General information
- Status: Completed
- Type: Hotel
- Location: No. 9, Section 1, Nanjing East Road, Zhongshan District, Taipei, Taiwan
- Coordinates: 25°03′09″N 121°31′24″E
- Opened: 3 August 2012
- Owner: Okura Hotels & Resorts

Other information
- Number of rooms: 207
- Number of suites: 7
- Number of restaurants: 3
- Number of bars: 1
- Public transit: Zhongshan metro station

Website
- Official website

The Okura Prestige Taipei is a hotel in Taipei, Taiwan that is part of the Japanese chain Okura Hotels & Resorts. The 18-floor building has a height of 69.9 m (229 ft) with 207 rooms, and opened on 3 August 2012.

== Location ==
The closest metro station to the hotel is Zhongshan metro station located on the intersection of the Tamsui-Xinyi and Songshan–Xindian lines of the Taipei Metro.

== Awards ==
- DestinAsian Readers' Choice Awards 2017 No. 5 in Taiwan

== Restaurants ==
- Toh-Ka-Lin, Cantonese restaurant with two Michelin stars
- Yamazato, restaurant with one Michelin star. Serves the authentic Japanese kaiseki kitchen
- Continental Room, buffet restaurant offering French cuisine
- Pearl, lounge and bar
- The Nine, bakery offering pastries and cakes
