= Vinkeles =

Coordinates: 52°22′9.03″N 4°53′3.42″E

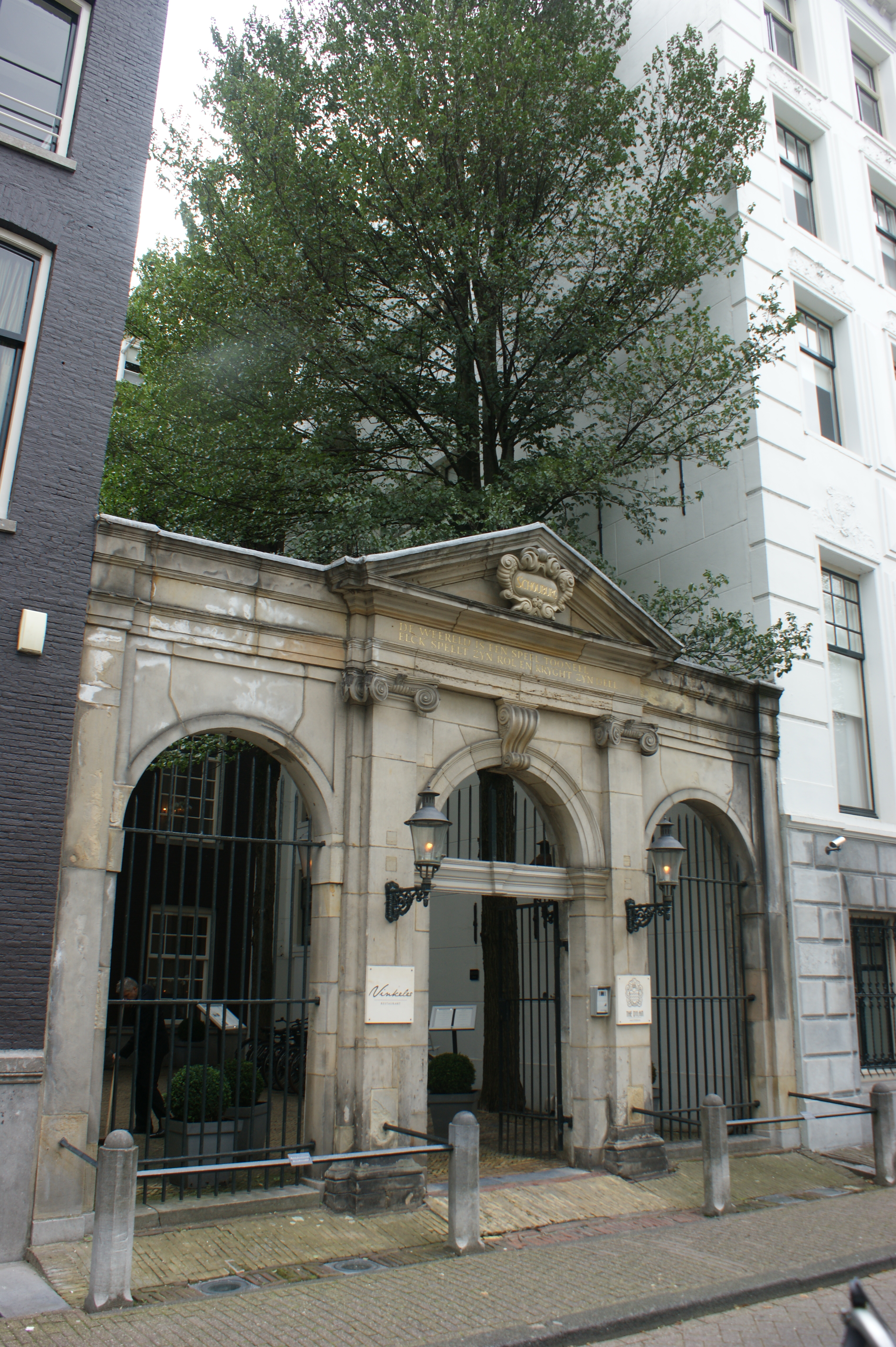
- Interactive map of Vinkeles

Restaurant information
- Established: 2008
- Head chef: Dennis Kuipers
- Food type: French
- Rating: Michelin Guide
- Location: Keizersgracht 384, Amsterdam, 1016 GB, Netherlands
- Website: Official website

Vinkeles is a restaurant located in Hotel The Dylan in Amsterdam, Netherlands. It is a fine dining restaurant that was awarded one Michelin star in 2010 and retained that rating until present.

in 2013, GaultMillau awarded the restaurant 17 out of 20 points.

Head chef of Vinkeles is Dennis Kuipers.

Vinkeles is a member of Alliance Gastronomique Neerlandaise.

== Name ==
The restaurant is named after the 18th century painter and engraver Reinier Vinkeles. Vinkeles made an etch from the entrance of a former theatre, burnt down in 1772. At the free space, the Roman Catholic "Ouderen & Armen kantoor" was built. It is now the entrance to the restaurant and the hotel.

== See also ==
- List of Michelin starred restaurants in the Netherlands
