= The Seafood Bar =

Restaurant information
- Established: 2012
- Owner: Fons de Visscher
- Food type: Seafood
- Location: Amsterdam, Utrecht, London, Netherlands, United Kingdom
- Reservations: Yes
- Website: www.theseafoodbar.com

The Seafood Bar is a family-owned seafood restaurant chain based in the Netherlands. It was founded in 2012, when Fons De Visscher, a fishmonger for 27 years in Helmond, opened a fish restaurant on Van Baerlestraat in Amsterdam. De Visscher also operated The Seafood Shop, a local fish shop in Amsterdam that was closed by the local authorities.

== Locations ==
The Seafood Bar operates in five locations:

- Van Baerlestraat, Amsterdam
- Spui, Amsterdam
- Ferdinand Bolstraat, Amsterdam
- Damrak, Amsterdam
- Stationsplein, Utrecht
- Soho, London (opened 2010)
