= Tumon Bay =

Bay in Guam

Tumon Bay Marine Preserve
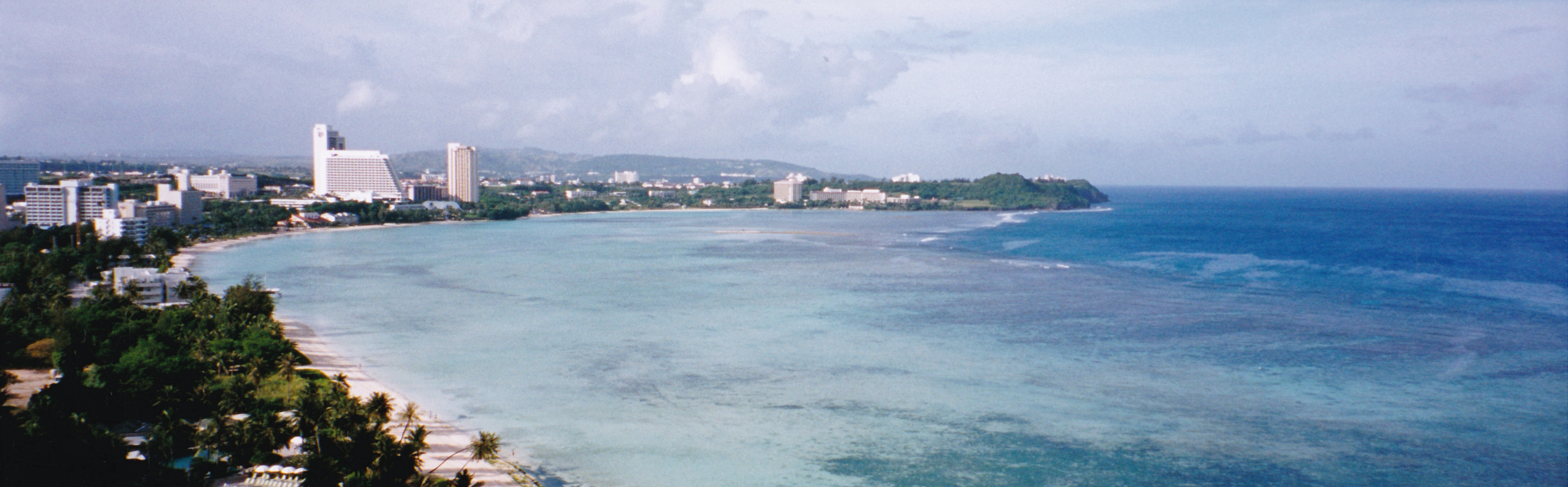
- Tumon Bay from the north, 2000

- Location within Guam Location within Pacific Ocean Location within Earth
- Location: Philippine Sea / Tumon, Guam
- Nearest city: Tamuning, Guam
- Coordinates: 13.5138953°N 144.7930245°E
- Area: 4.54 square kilometres (1,120 acres)
- Established: 1999
- Governing body: Guam Department of Agriculture

Tumon Bay is a bay in the United States territory of Guam, opening to the Philippine Sea. It is bounded to the north by Two Lovers Point and to the south by Ypao Point. The entirety of the bay falls within the Tumon Bay Marine Preserve, also known as the Tumon Bay Marine Preserve Area (MPA) and Tumon Preserve, one of five marine preserves on Guam. The Preserve measures 4.54 square kilometers and is roughly two miles long. The platform of the fringing reef that separates the open ocean from the lagoon is up to 1,450 feet (440 m) wide. and up to one mile from the shore. The bay is located off of the Tumon area, the tourist center of the island, in the village of Tamuning. The bay is extensively utilized for recreation and fishing.

== History ==
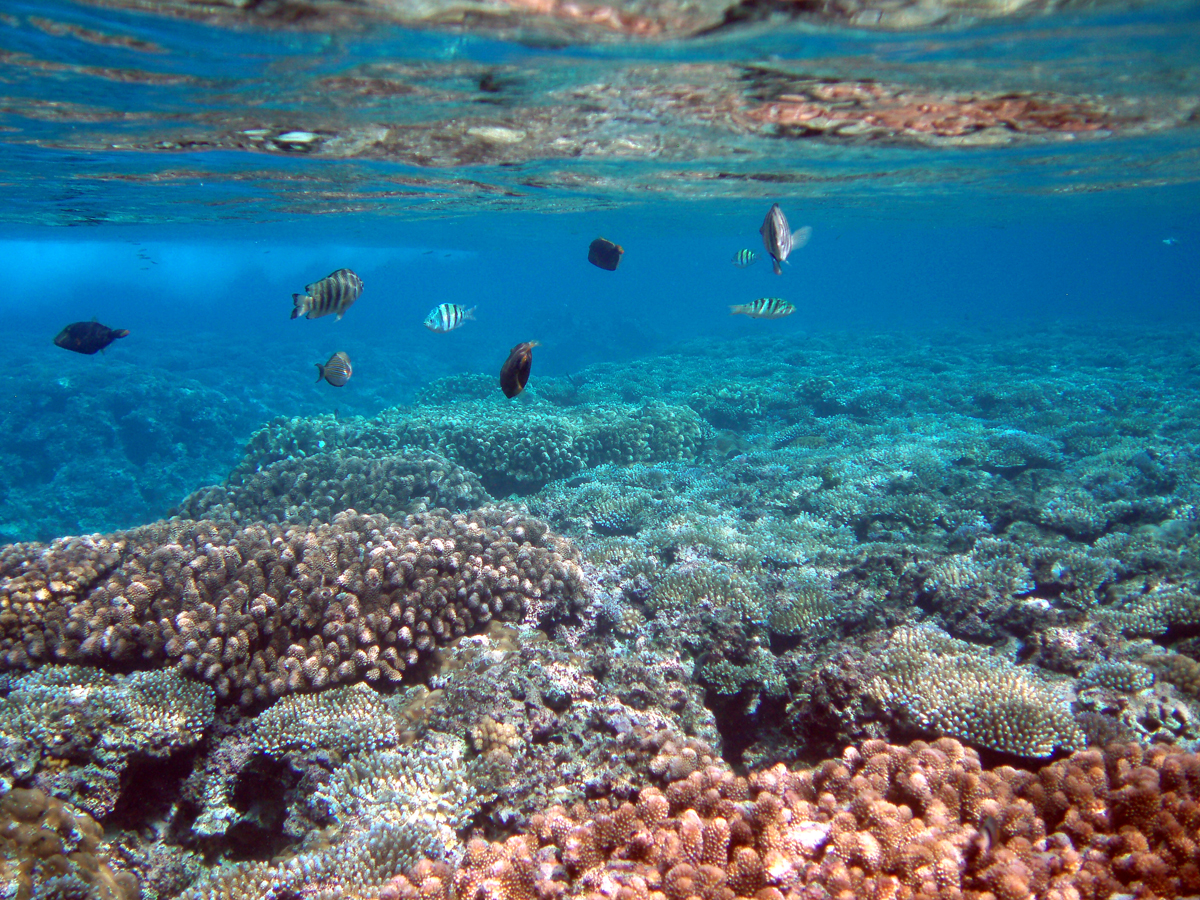
Fish and coral in Tumon Bay, 2008

Tumon Bay or Agana Bay are the most likely locations that Ferdinand Magellan dropped anchor on March 6, 1521, which was the island's first encounter with Europeans. The bodies of Diego Luis de San Vitores and Pedro Calungsod were thrown into the bay following their murders on April 2, 1672, during the Spanish-Chamorro Wars. In response, the Spanish launched a punitive attack on Tumon, burning several houses and sakman. However, the Spanish column was attacked on both flanks as it waded through the waters of Tumon Bay, losing three soldiers to poison spears. Two Chamorro warriors were killed in the battle. During the Japanese invasion in 1941, the South Seas Detachment under the command of Major-General Tomitarō Horii made landings at Tumon Bay.

In the 1960s, the Government of Guam blasted a shallow cut in the fringing reef opposite San Vitores Beach to allow entry by small boats. As hotels were built along the shore in the 1970s and 1980s, holes to allow swimming at low tide were dredged along the beach at Hilton Hotel, Ypao Beach Park, the Pacific Star (now Marriot) Hotel, and San Vitores Beach.

In 1986 the Guam Division of Aquatic and Wildlife Resources determined that fish stocks had declined 70% in the previous 15 years and began the process of setting aside areas around Guam with limited take. In 1996, Guam passed a law prohibited motorized watercraft from being used inside the Tumon reef, with the exception of jet skis transiting from San Vitores Beach directly through the cut into the open ocean. A dinner boat is also allowed to use the cut to gain entry to the ocean. Fishing boats, even if not motorized, were banned from the lagoon in 1999 when the marine preserve area was established. Currently, only small recreational and paddling craft are allowed to utilize the lagoon. In the 1990s, as hotels filled up the beachfront property along Tumon Bay, the bay was dredged by the hotel community to remove the seaweed that frequently washed ashore and "despoiled the beauty" of the beach.

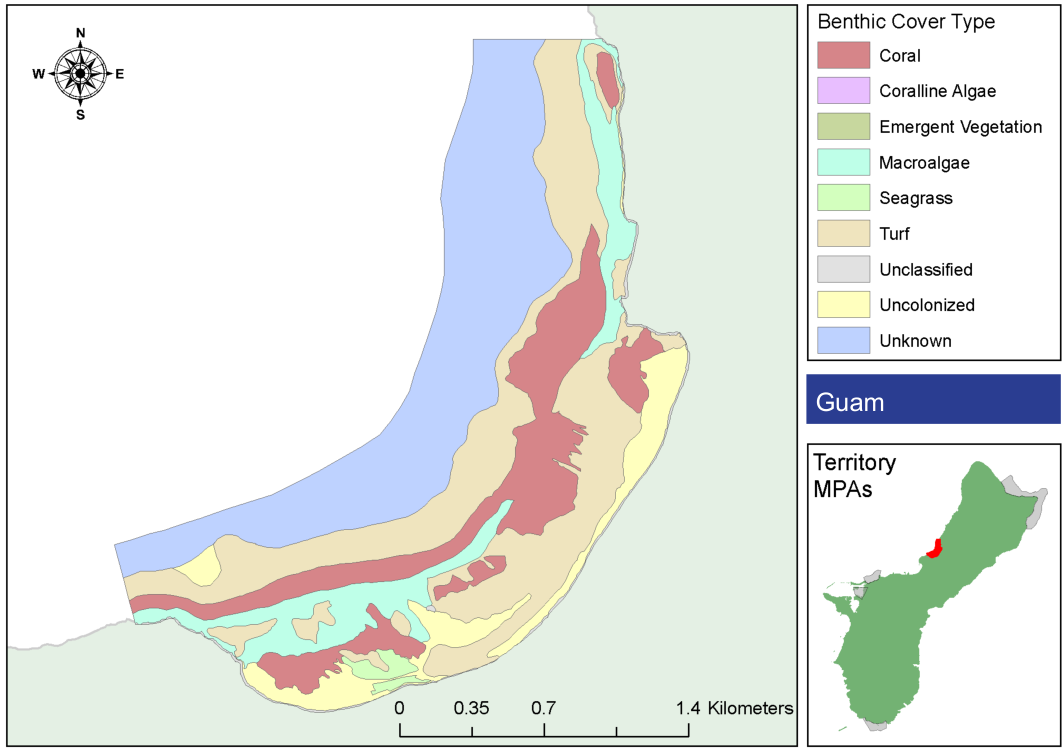
Map of benthic cover at Tumon Bay Marine Preserve, 2009

Marine preserves began to be fully enforced in 2001. In 2005, the interagency Guam Coral Reef Monitoring Group began monitoring Tumon Bay. The Tumon Bay preserve comprises 9.2% of all marine protected area on Guam. In a 2009 study, 18% of the preserve was coral, 10% was seaweed, and 1% was seagrasses. Within the Tumon preserve, all species of fish may be caught by hook-and-line. Juvenile (4 inches or less) Goatfish and Jack may additionally be caught from the shore with cast net. Rabbitfish and Convict Tang may be caught from the shore or reef line with cast net. Bottom fishing is allowed from the 100 foot contour outwards. Trolling is allowed from the reef margin seaward for pelagic fish only. Arrests for illegal fishing in Tumon continue to be made. The Guam Long-Term Coral Reef Monitoring Program began partial monitoring of Tumon Bay Marine Preserve in June 2009 and began full data monitoring in 2010. It was determined that the southern and northern halves of the study site had very different benthic communities and the site was redrawn to get adequate monitoring of both communities. A 2010 study found that the establishment of Guam's marine preserves had doubled the death rate by drowning of Chamorro fisherman, with the hypothesis being that they were pushed into more hazardous areas.

It will take many years for the seaweed and fish to come back to their previous levels. The beach along Hotel Row was also covered with rocks, many of which were removed as well. The coral reef fringing Tumon Bay suffers from nutrient infusion and algal blooms associated with fresh water seepage from hotels along the beach. The fresh water is likely coming from irrigation systems used by the hotels to maintain tropical garden landscaping around the hotel. The freshwater can be seen leaching into the bay at low tide. Further evidence is the very visible algal blooms created by the nutrient rich fresh water.

== Current uses ==
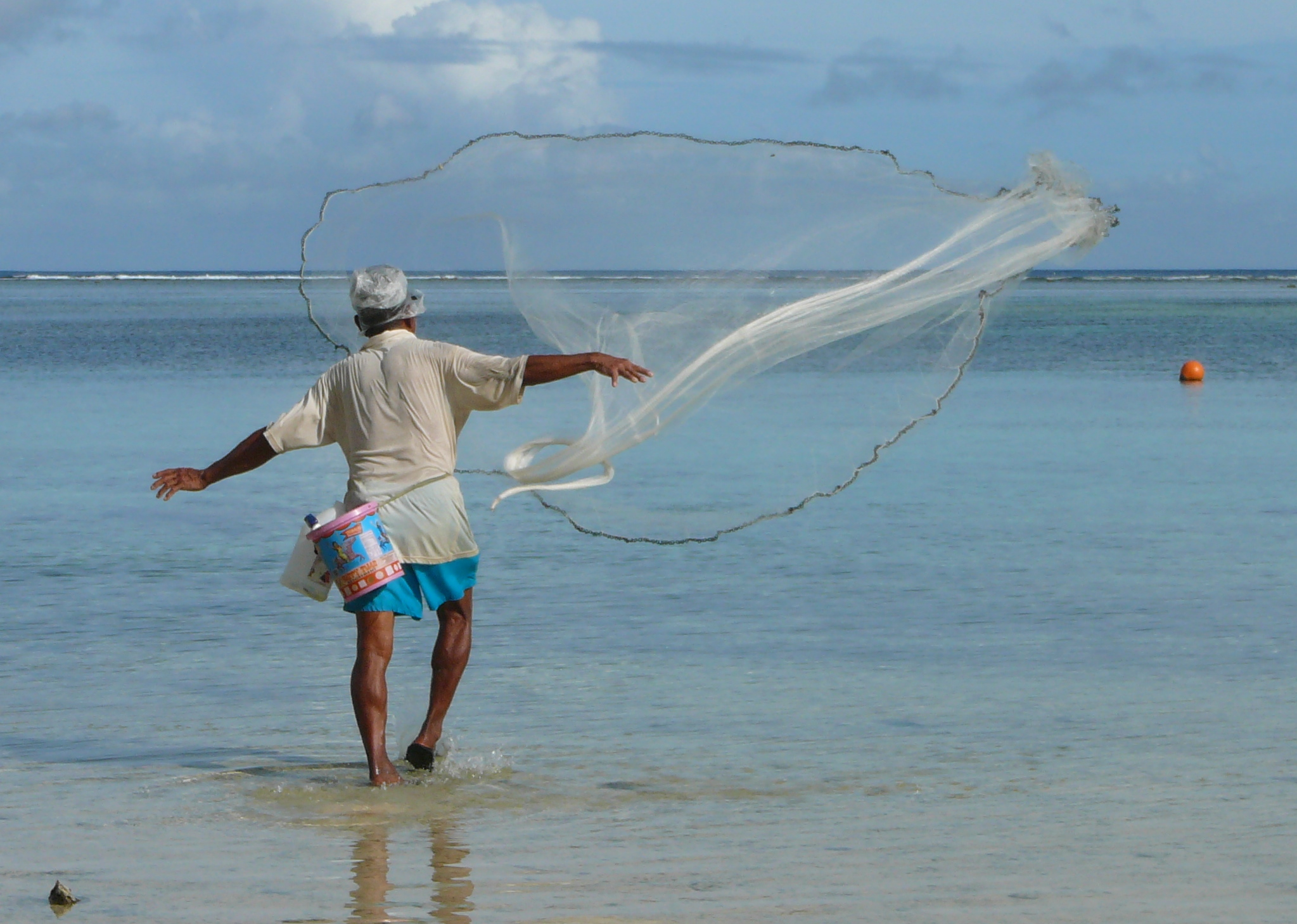
Throw net fishing on Tumon Bay, 2006

The bay is continuously utilized for fishing and recreational uses, including swimming and use of small unmotorized watercraft. The lagoon offers sites for both beginner and advanced snorkeling. Outrigger canoe teams sail on the bay out of Matapang Beach. Matapang Beach and Tumon Bay hosted outrigger canoeing at the 1999 South Pacific Games. Scuba diving off of Gun Beach, located on the northern end of the bay, offers what Stars and Stripes states is "often referred to as 'the best shore dive on Guam'".
