= De Trechter =

Coordinates: 52°21′14.52″N 4°53′10.61″E

- Interactive map of De Trechter

Restaurant information
- Established: 1982
- Closed: 1996
- Chef: Jan de Wit
- Food type: French
- Rating: Michelin Guide
- Location: Hobbemakade 96, Amsterdam, 1071 XL, Netherlands

Restaurant De Trechter is a defunct restaurant in Amsterdam, in the Netherlands. It was a fine dining restaurant that was awarded one Michelin star in 1985 and retained that rating until 1995.

Owner and head chef of De Trechter was Jan de Wit. De Wit closed down De Trechter and moved on to restaurant De Nederlanden, after a conflict about bins and binbags with the municipality of Amsterdam.

About the conflict he said:

"In Frankrijk legt de overheid een weg aan naar een sterrenzaak, bij mij zetten ze de vuilniszakken voor de deur."
English: "In France, the government built a road to a star restaurant, to me they put the garbage outside the door."

After closure of De Trechter the building was taken over by restaurant En Route, that was replaced in 2008 by Magnolia.

== See also ==
- List of Michelin starred restaurants in the Netherlands
