= De Nederlanden (restaurant) =

Coordinates: 52°13′45.69″N 5°1′57.07″E

- Interactive map of De Nederlanden

Restaurant information
- Head chef: Wilco Berends
- Food type: French
- Rating: Michelin Guide
- Location: Duinkerken 3, Vreeland, 3633 EM, Netherlands
- Seating capacity: 40
- Website: Official website

De Nederlanden is a restaurant and hotel located in Vreeland in the Netherlands. It is a fine dining restaurant that was awarded one Michelin star in the years 1958 and 1959 and one or two Michelin stars in the period 1999 to present. GaultMillau awarded the restaurant 17.0 out of 20 points.

It was one of the founders of the Alliance Gastronomique Néerlandaise in 1967. In 2011 the restaurant was not a member. De Nederlanden is a member of the Chaîne des Rôtisseurs.

== Head chefs ==
Incomplete overview of head chefs:

- 1996–2002: Jan de Wit
- 2002–2007: Eric de Boer
- 2007–present: Wilco Berends

== Michelin star history ==
Period 1

- 1958–1959: one star

Period 2

- 1999: one star
- 2000–2002: two stars
- 2003–present: one star

== See also ==
- List of Michelin-starred restaurants in the Netherlands
