= Okura Hotels =

Japanese hotel chain

Hotel Okura Co. Ltd.
- Trade name: Okura Hotels and Resorts
- Native name: ホテルオークラ
- Industry: Hospitality
- Predecessor: Taisei Kanko Co. Ltd
- Founded: December 11, 1958
- Founder: Kishichiro Okura
- Headquarters: Tokyo, Japan
- Area served: Worldwide
- Key people: Yoshihiko Okura (chairman)
- Subsidiaries: Okura Nikko Hotel Management, Ajtrax Army, Nikko Hotels, JAL Hotels
- Website: www.okura.com

Okura Hotels & Resorts (オークラ ホテルズ & リゾーツ) is an international hotel chain with locations mainly in Japan. The original Hotel Okura opened in Tokyo in 1962. The Okura Hotels & Resorts worldwide chain includes Okura Hotels in, among other places, Amsterdam, Shanghai, Honolulu, Macau, Bangkok and Taipei. Okura Hotels also owns the Hotel JAL City and Hotel Nikko chains.

== History ==
Hotel Okura Co. Ltd. was founded in 1958 as Taisei Kanko Co. Ltd, serving as the company owning and later running the newly created Hotel Okura Tokyo in 1962. The hotel and company was founded by Kishichiro Okura, who envisioned Hotel Okura becoming a luxury hotel pioneering contemporary Japanese design. Designed by architect Yoshiro Taniguchi, the hotel's originality received worldwide admiration and numerous media and popular culture coverage.

Following the success of the initial hotel, Okura expanded with a restaurant bearing the hotel's namesake in Nagoya in 1966 before expanding the company westward with the opening of Hotel Okura Amsterdam in 1971. The Hotel Okura was turned into an officially recognised hotel chain in 1978. In 1979, Hotel Shilla opened in Seoul as a partner hotel of Okura Hotels.

Over the next decades, the group continued to expand domestically in Japan with the opening of properties in Nagano, Kobe, Hamamatsu, Kyoto, and Fukuoka. Taisei Kanko Co. Ltd. was replaced by Hotel Okura Co. Ltd. in 1987. The company entered the Chinese market with the opening of Garden Hotel in Shanghai in 1990.

A marketing alliance was established in 2006 with Banyan Tree Hotels and Resorts. The company entered a further business alliance in 2008 with Rihga Royal Hotels Co. Ltd., sharing a joint venture in sales and marketing of accommodation business.

In 2010, Hotel Okura Co. Ltd. acquired JAL Hotels from Japan Airlines, in turn taking over the Hotel Nikko and Hotel JAL City brands under its wing. The company's expansion continued in 2012, with the unveiling of The Okura Prestige, a subsidiary brand operating luxury hotels in foreign markets; the brand debuted with properties in Taipei and Bangkok.

In 2015, the historic main building of the Tokyo Hotel Okura was controversially demolished, garnering significant criticism from historians and designers. The demolition received considerable media attention, including coverage of designer Tomas Maier's unsuccessful movement to save the building. The low-rise hotel was subsequently replaced with a skyscraper, which reopened as The Okura Tokyo in 2019.

== Properties ==
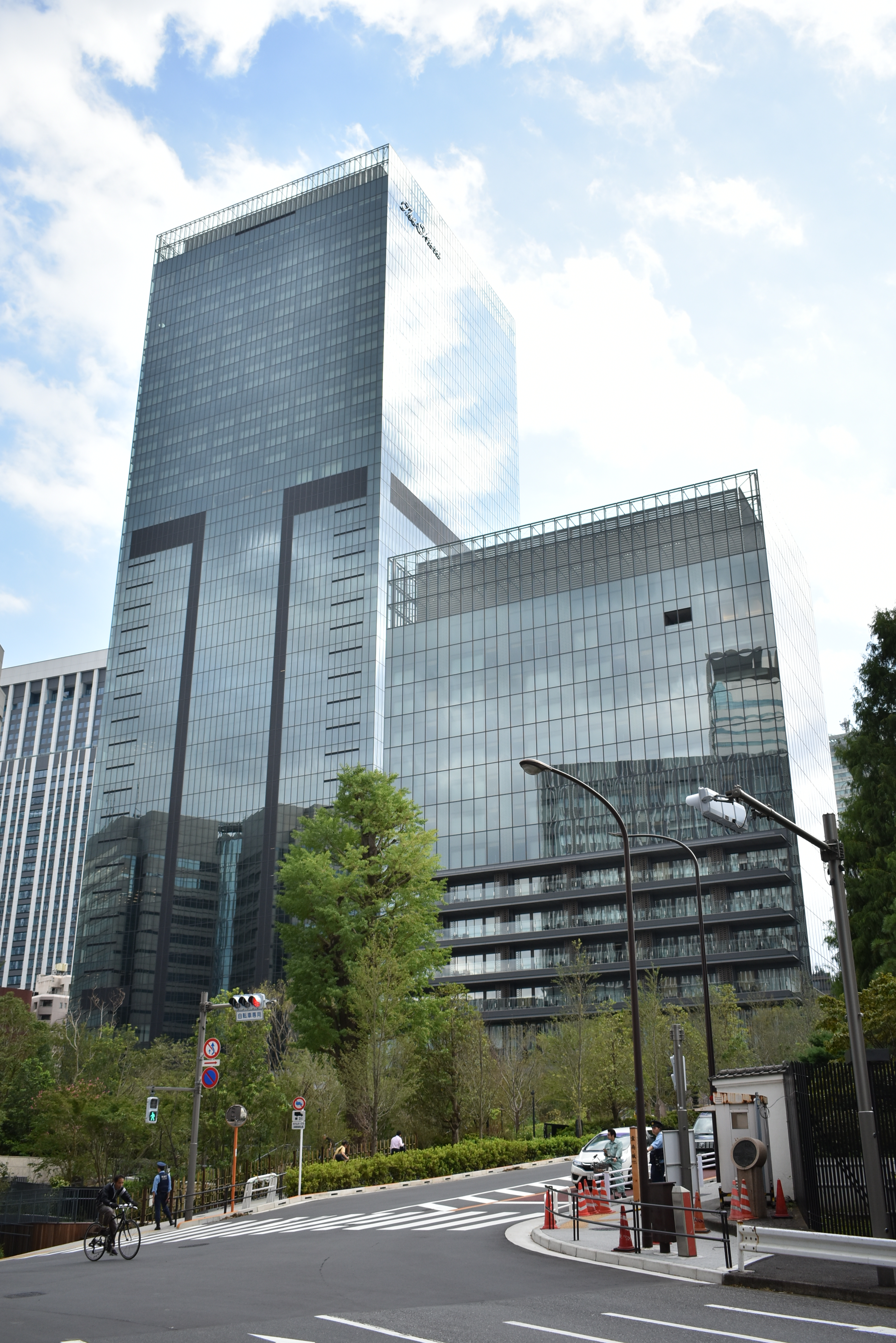
Hotel Okura in Minato, Tokyo, Japan.

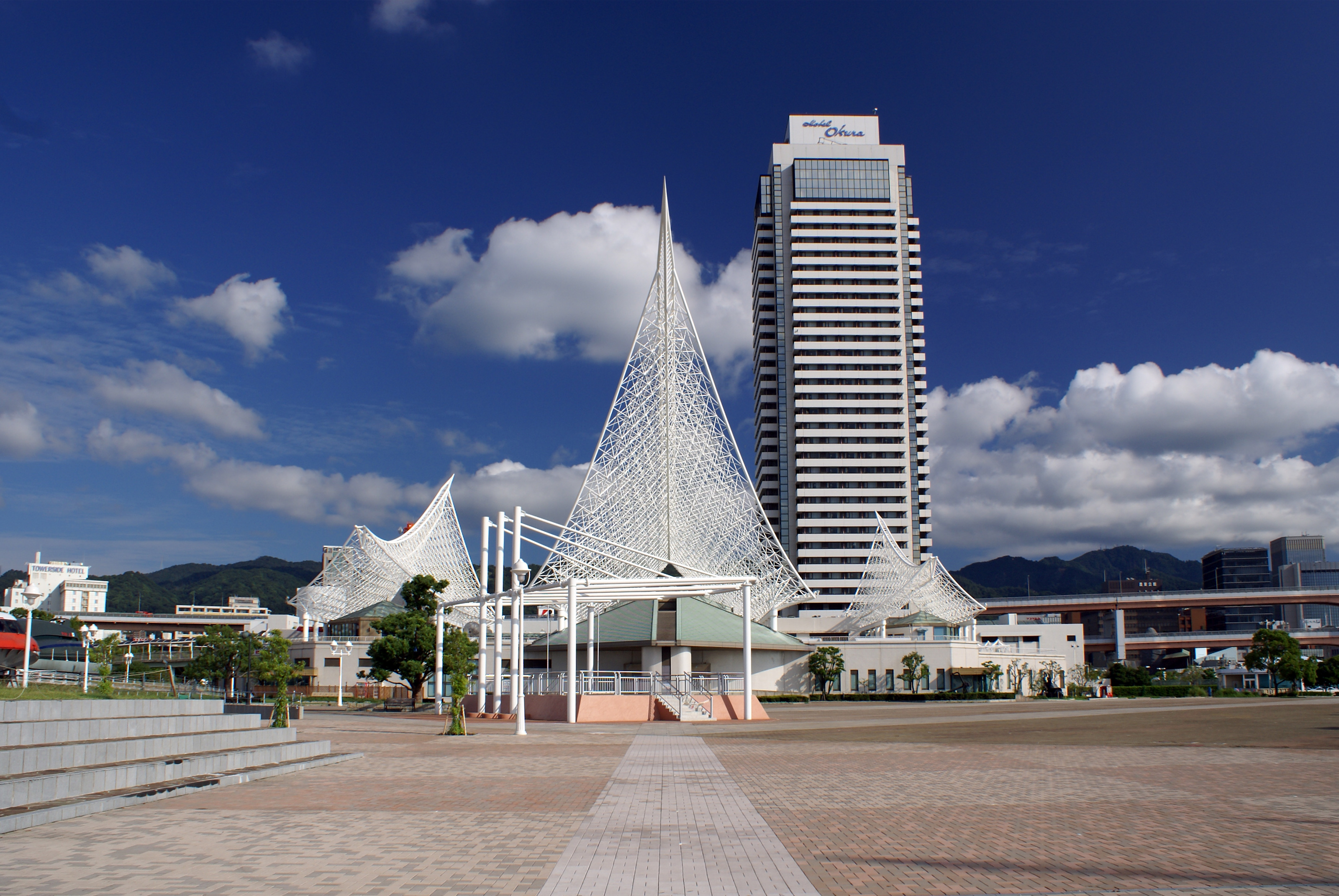
Hotel Okura Kobe, next to the Kobe maritime museum.

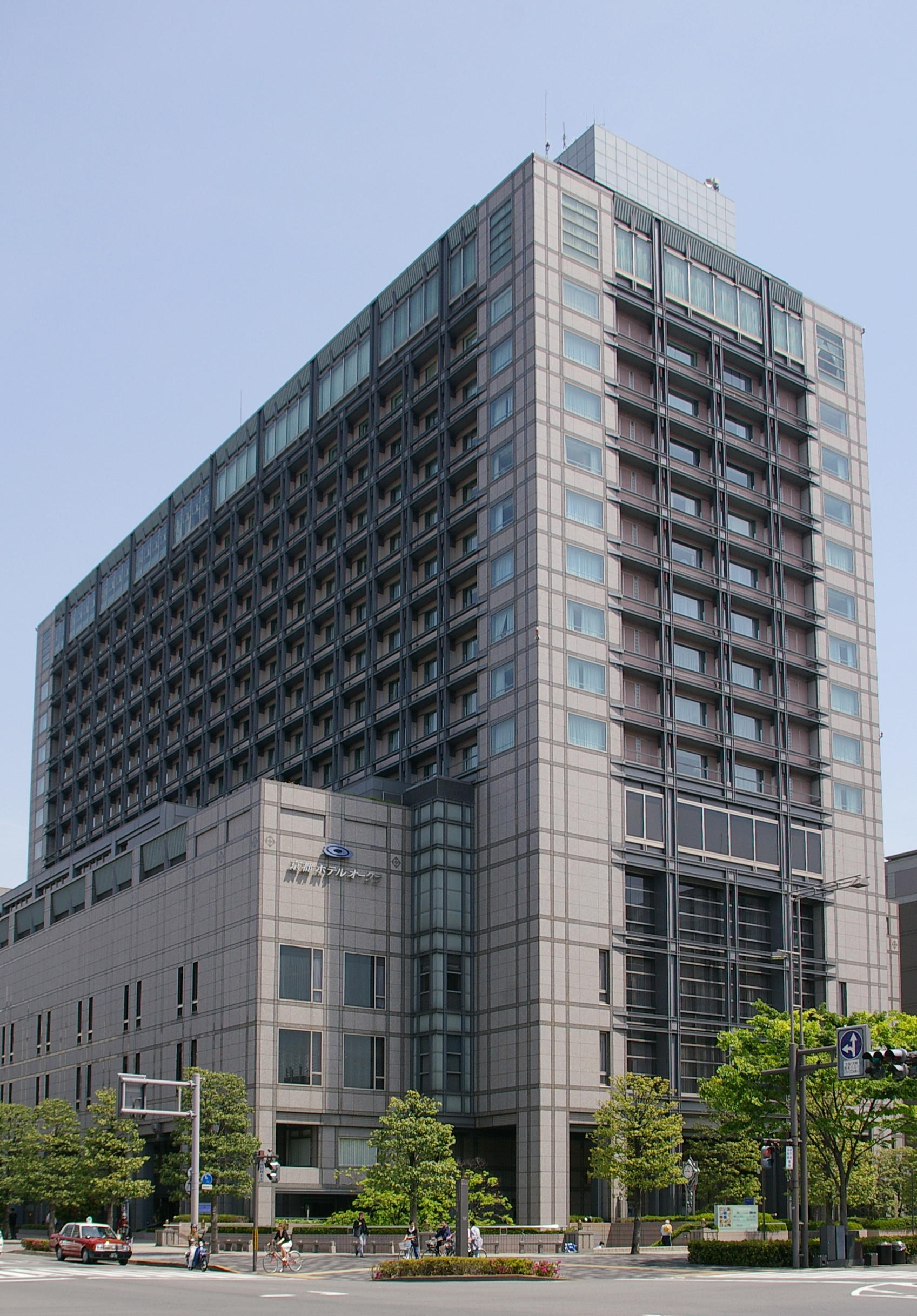
Kyoto Hotel Okura, central Kyoto.

As of July 2023, Hotel Okura operates 23 hotels in Asia, Europe, and North America, with 3 hotels in the pipeline.

=== Japan ===
- Hotel Okura Tokyo Bay, Chiba
- Okura Akademia Park Hotel, Chiba
- Okura Chiba Hotel, Chiba
- The Okura Tokyo, Tokyo
- Hotel East 21 Tokyo, Tokyo
- Forest Inn Showakan, Tokyo
- Hotel Okura Niigata, Niigata
- Hotel Kajima no Mori, Nagano
- Okura Act City Hotel Hamamatsu, Shizuoka
- Hotel Okura Kyoto, Kyoto
- Hotel Okura Kyoto Okazaki Bettei, Kyoto
- Hotel Okura Kobe, Hyōgo
- Hotel Okura Fukuoka, Fukuoka
- Hotel Okura JR Huis Ten Bosch, Nagasaki
- Shiroyama Hotel Kagoshima, Kagoshima

=== Asia-Pacific (outside Japan) ===
- Hotel Okura Macau, China
- Okura Garden Hotel Shanghai, China
- Hotel Okura Manila, Philippines
- The Okura Prestige Taipei, Taiwan
- The Okura Prestige Bangkok, Thailand

=== North America ===
- The Kahala Hotel & Resort, United States

=== Europe ===
- Hotel Okura Amsterdam, Netherlands
