= Yamazato =

Coordinates: 52°20′54.23″N 4°53′36.99″E

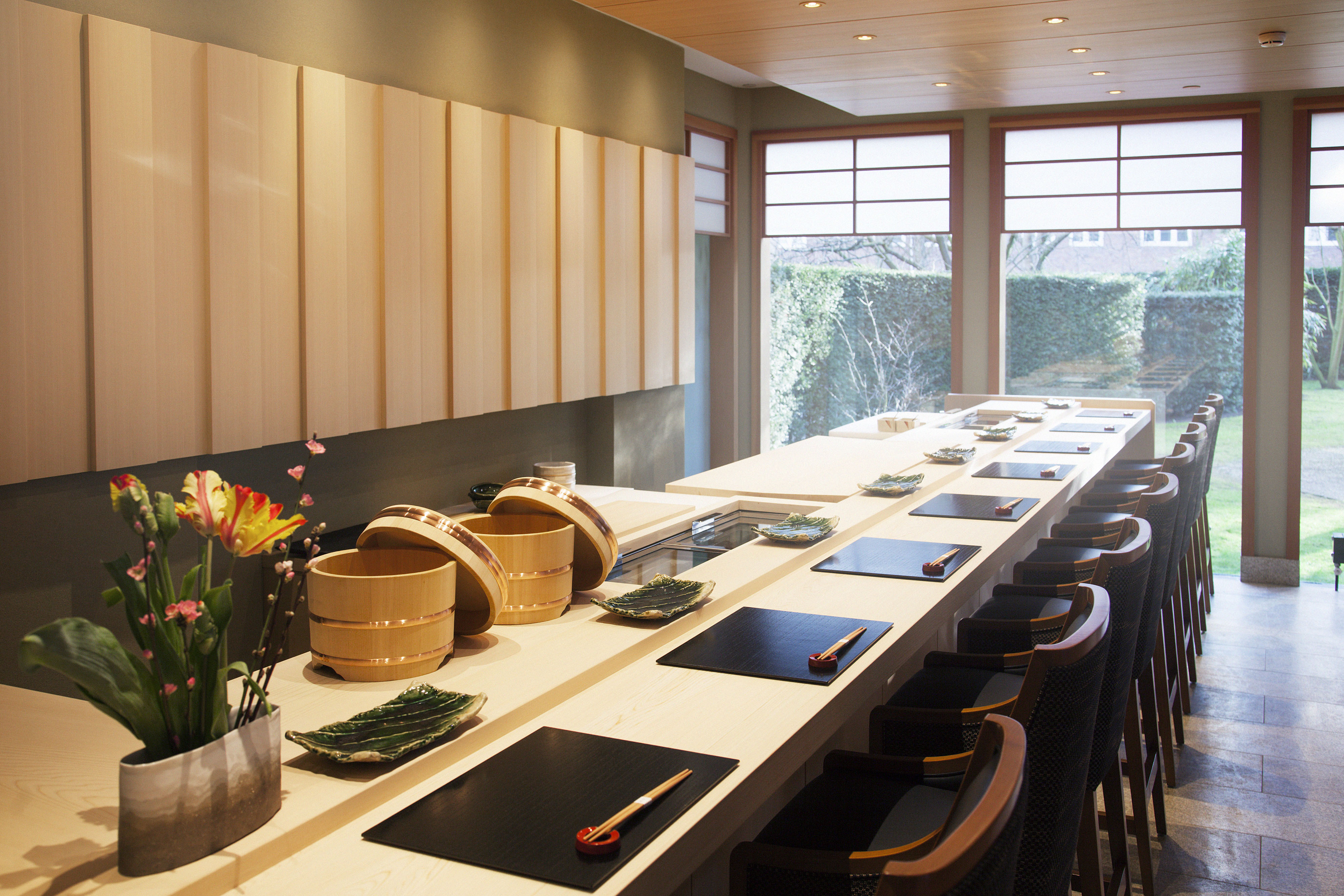
- Yamazato Restaurant - sushicounter
- Interactive map of Yamazato

Restaurant information
- Established: 1971
- Head chef: Masanori Tomikawa
- Food type: Japanese
- Rating: Michelin Guide
- Location: Ferdinand Bolstraat 333, Amsterdam, 1072 LH, Netherlands
- Seating capacity: 140
- Website: Official website

Yamazato is a restaurant housed in the Okura Hotel in Amsterdam in the Netherlands. It is a fine dining restaurant and has had one Michelin star since 2002. According to Misset Horeca, the American restaurant guide Zagat praised the restaurant in 2001, shortly before Yamazato earned its Michelin star.

GaultMillau awarded the restaurant 16 out of 20 points.

The head chef of Yamazato is Masanori Tomikawa. Tomikawa took over the kitchen in March 2010, replacing Akira Oshima, who had been the head chef since 1977.

Yamazato is a member of the Alliance Gastronomique Néerlandaise. They joined the Alliance in 2003.

== See also ==
- List of Michelin starred restaurants in the Netherlands
