= Karl Henry von Wiegand =

German-born American journalist and war correspondent

Karl H. Von Wiegand
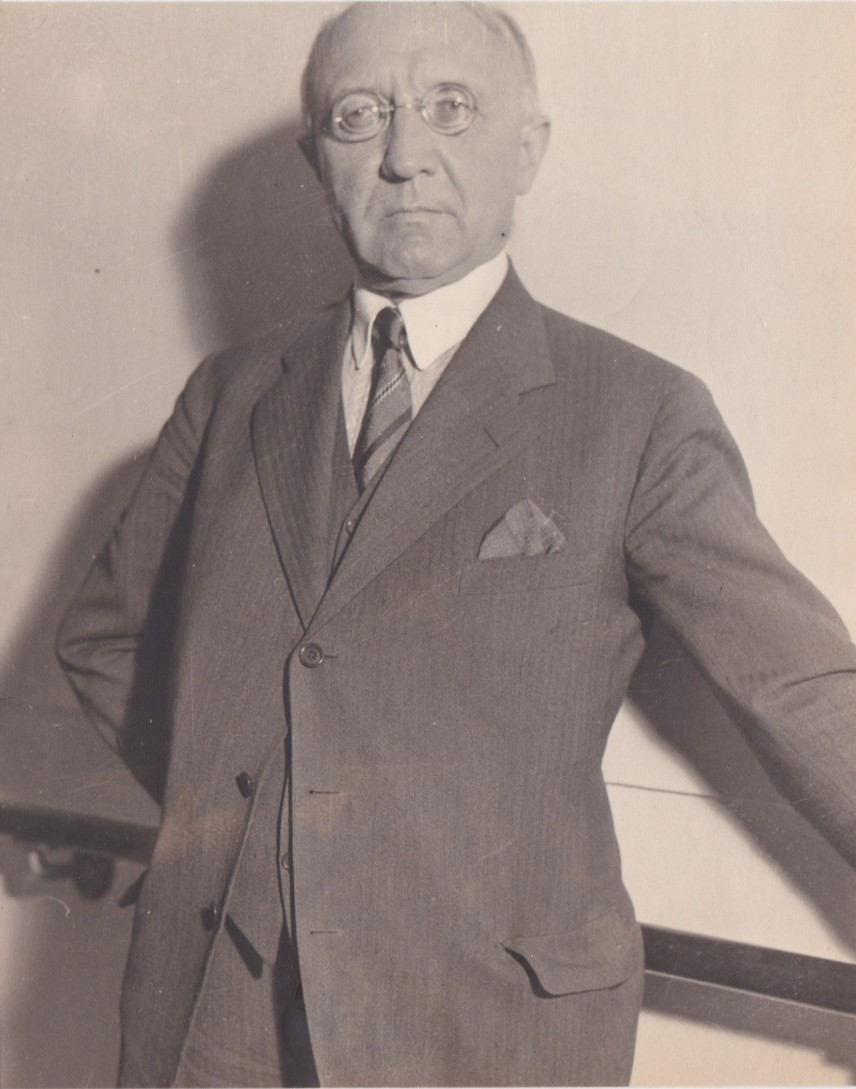
- Von Wiegand in 1932
- Born: September 11, 1874; Glaam, Hesse, Germany
- Died: June 7, 1961 (aged 86); Zürich, Switzerland
- Occupations: Journalist, war correspondent
- Employers: San Francisco Examiner; Los Angeles Examiner; Associated Press; United Press; New York World; International News Service
- Known for: Reporting from Germany during World War I and Interwar period; interviews with Adolf Hitler
- Spouse: Inez Royce
- Children: Charmion Von Wiegand (daughter); Norman Von Wiegand (son)
- Parents: Henry Wiegand (father); Anna Margueret Wiegand, née Mehlmann (mother)

Signature
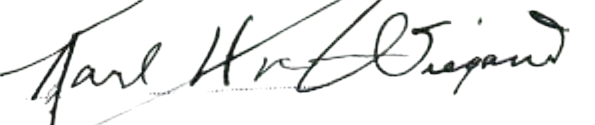

Karl Henry von Wiegand (September 11, 1874 – June 7, 1961) was a German born American journalist and war correspondent. Von Wiegand became one of the longest-serving American journalists stationed in Berlin, Germany.

Although Von Wiegand is most widely known for his extensive tenure with Hearst media outlets, his journalistic reputation was initially established through his work with the Associated Press in California and United Press in Europe. In 1911, he became a foreign correspondent for United Press in Europe. During the First World War, Von Wiegand gained prominence for reporting from Germany and conducting exclusive interviews with members of German political and social elite. In August 1914, at the onset of World War I, the New York newspaper The Sun reported that Von Wiegand was the only American correspondent permitted to remain in Berlin. In 1914-1915, Von Wiegand interviewed German crown prince Crown Prince Wilhelm, grand admiral Alfred von Tirpitz, and Ferdinand von Zeppelin.

Von Wiegand was the first American journalist to interview Adolf Hitler in 1922. The report of this interview datelined November 12, 1922, was published in the New York American.

== Early life ==
Von Wiegand was born on September 11, 1874, in the village of Glaam in Hesse, German Empire, to parents Henry and Anne Margueret Wiegand. In 1880, at the age of five or six, his family immigrated to the United States. According to census records, both of his parents were naturalized as U.S. citizens in 1885. While their first language was German, records indicate that they were both fluent in English and literate. Henry and Anne Wiegand remained together until Henry's death from hepatic carcinoma in August 1926 in Fontanelle, Iowa. Anne Wiegand died from bronchial pneumonia a few months later, in January 1927.

According to Von Wiegand's notes for an outline of an autobiography that he never wrote, his childhood in Iowa was a difficult period for his family. Von Wiegand experienced the hardships of his father's struggles to maintain their farm, which ultimately led to the loss of two family properties. By the age of fourteen, Von Wiegand witnessed his father's ongoing financial struggles, prompting him to leave home without telling his parents and siblings of his plans.

According to Von Wiegand's archival notes, he found employment on Buffalo Bill's ranch before venturing further westward. At some point between 1888 and 1899, Von Wiegand served as an operator at the Western Union office in Phoenix.

=== Surname ===
Official records indicate that Von Wiegand's family name was recorded as "Wiegand," without the "von" particle often used in German surnames to denote noble lineage. It is therefore likely that Von Wiegand adopted the aristocratic "von" when he began his journalism career in the early 1900s. In 1899, his first signed article, simply under the name "Wiegand," appeared in an Arizona newspaper.

== Early career in journalism ==
Von Wiegand started his journalistic career in the Arizona newspapers in 1899. Later, Von Wiegand's association with the Randolph Hearst newspapers began when he joined the San Francisco Examiner in 1902, followed by his tenure at the Los Angeles Examiner.

In March 1903, while working as a reporter for the San Francisco Examiner, Von Wiegand was assaulted by Albert W. Rhodes while attempting to conduct an interview for a newspaper story about the Flora Eberling poisoning case. Following the incident, the San Francisco Examiner reported that Von Wiegand became the first journalist to benefit from the so-called Heart’s Prosecution Fund, established for the protection of newspaper reporters in legitimate performance of their duties. The prosecution, conducted on behalf of the San Francisco Examiner, resulted in Albert W. Rhodes being fined twenty US dollars on March 12, 1903.

== Associated Press (1905-1911) ==
From at least 1905, Von Wiegand served as the staff correspondent for the Associated Press in San Francisco. During the Russo-Japanese War, Von Wiegand served as the cable editor for the Associated Press in San Francisco. In May 1908, he was one of the first to report on the Berkeley airship disaster.

On November 14, 1908, while working as an Associated Press reporter, Von Wiegand witnessed the attempted murder of Assistant District Attorney Francis J. Heney during a brief recess of the Ruef trial. Subsequently, Von Wiegand was called as a witness in the trial of Morris Hass.

== United Press (1911-1915) ==
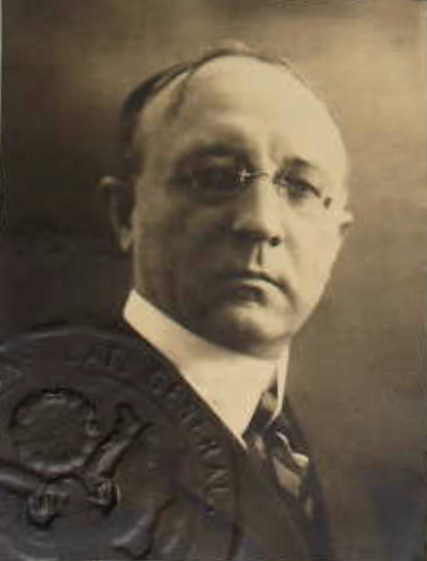
Karl H. Von Wiegand in 1923 (passport application photo)

In 1911, Von Wiegand was hired by the United Press and remained with the organization until 1915. In August 1911, he was appointed as the Berlin bureau chief for the United Press in Germany. He departed from the U.S. for his European assignment with his family aboard the St. Louis via London on August 19, 1911.

As the Berlin bureau chief, Von Wiegand succeeded Herbert A. White. Prior to joining the United Press, he served as the San Francisco Manager for the Associated Press, where he remained for seven years. According to a United Press release, by 1911, Von Wiegand was described as "probably one of the best known and most popular of the younger newspaper men on the Pacific coast".

=== World War I ===
From the start of the war, Von Wiegand, as the German-speaking Berlin correspondent for United Press, reported on the German side of the war. At the beginning of the war, his reports described the situation inside Germany and the Western Front.

==== Battle of Wirballen ====
As a representative of the United Press in Berlin, Von Wiegand used his network of German connections to get permission to travel and report from the Eastern Front. In the first week of October 1914, Von Wiegand travelled under three German officer escort from Berlin to Russian Poland. Von Wiegand caught up with the German army east of the town of Wirballen, the present-day town of Kybartai, Lithuania. Here the German advance extended a long front north of Warsaw. On October 8 Von Wiegand climbed to a hilltop to watch the third day of the battle of Wirballen. In his report, Von Wiegand described the terrifying force of concentrated machine-gun power on closely packed Russian troops. According to Von Wiegand, “As a spectacle the whole thing was maddening. . . the men literally went down like dominoes in a row.” He also added the following: “Tonight I know why correspondents are not wanted on any of the battle lines. Descriptions and details of battles fought in the year of our Lord 1914 don’t make nice reading.”

The United Press' story of the battle of Wirballen was sent to London. Von Wiegand was pleasantly surprised to learn that the article had passed through British censorship unedited, approved for publication in the United States but not in Britain. It ran on the front page of nearly every United Press newspaper. It was his first big story of the war.

==== Crown prince Wilhelm interview ====
On November 20, 1914, Von Wiegand was given an interview by the crown prince crown prince Wilhelm. Von Wiegand became the first foreign reporter allowed to interview the crown prince. That interview was also the first foreign interview given by the German royal family since the outbreak of World War I.

The interview was regarded as “the greatest beat of the European war printed in America thus far.” It generated significant public interest due to the candid opinions expressed by crown prince Wilhelm. In the interview, the crown prince denied the existence of a war party in Berlin that had instigated the conflict. He expressed his regret over the negative perception of Germany by the American press and public, and he was perplexed by the blame placed on Germany for the war.

The dispatch was transmitted to London and was published under the United Press copyright line in most of the British newspapers. Editorial comments praised Von Wiegand for his diligence and skill in securing the interview.

==== German perspective ====
In December 1914, following the success of his interview with the crown prince Wilhelm, Von Wiegand conducted an interview with German grand admiral Alfred von Tirpitz, noted as the admiral's first interview with an American reporter. This interview was published by the United Press, with the story being copyrighted by the news agency.

In January 1915, Von Wiegand was granted unprecedented access to various parts of the German battle line. In another exclusive report in February 1915, Von Wiegand secured a two-part interview with count Ferdinand von Zeppelin, the architect of Germany’s airship bombers. The interview revealed von Zeppelin's regret over the casualties inflicted by his airships, particularly women and children.

A week later, Von Wiegand obtained an exclusive interview with the crown princess Cecilie of Germany. In this interview, the crown princess expressed her belief that women were the ultimate victims of the war. However, before von Wiegand could send the story, Cecilie edited the text, significantly redacting parts of his original copy.

From the outbreak of the First World War Von Wiegand worked to influence American public opinion in favour of Germany and against the Allies. In 1915 he published Current Misconceptions about the War, containing an interview with William, the German crown prince, and several essays, and a series of letters, all presenting the German point of view. William E. Dodd, US ambassador to Germany during the Roosevelt administration, later described him as a "very strongly pro-German representative through the Great War."

== Pulitzer's newspapers (1915-1917) ==
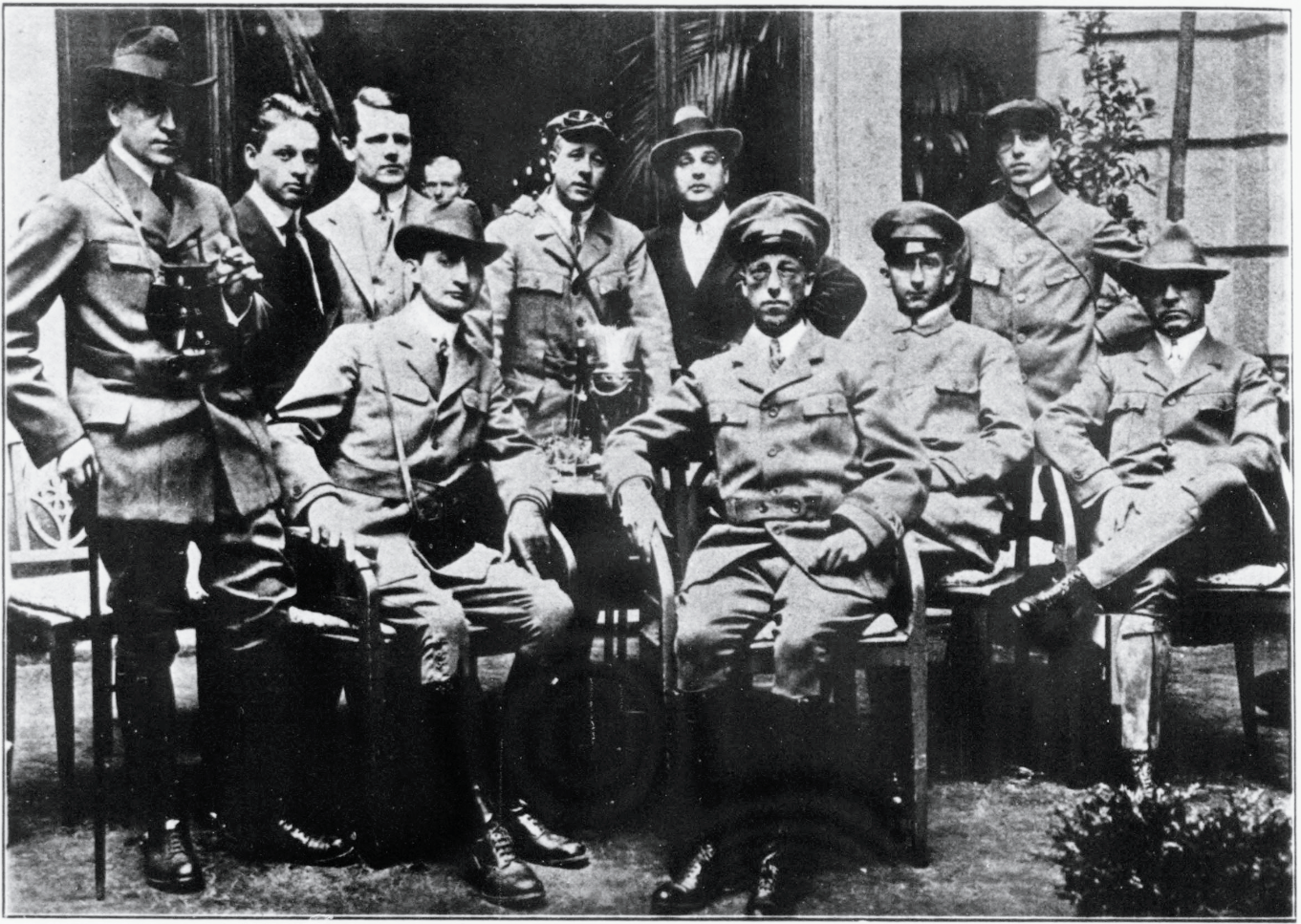
American war correspondents at the Berlin military headquarters of Germany (1915). Left to right: Cyrill Brown, T. K. Meloy, H. J. Reilly, Oswald Schuette, W. H. Durborough, Louis K. Marks (German medical doctor), S. B. Conger, S. M. Bouton, C. W. Ackerman and Karl H. Von Wiegand

In early 1915, Von Wiegand received an offer to leave United Press and join the staff of Pulitzer’s newspapers as a special correspondent in Germany, reporting for The New York World and the St. Louis Post-Dispatch. At the time, Von Wiegand was the sole representative of United Press in Berlin where he faced the challenging task of competing with five Associated Press reporters. The demanding nature of his work was reportedly contributing to health issues.

By late February 1915, tensions between United Press and Pulitzer’s newspapers escalated when United Press prepared a copyright violation lawsuit against the St. Louis Post-Dispatch for unauthorized use of Von Wiegand’s interview with the crown princess of Germany. The dispute arose because the St. Louis Post-Dispatch had been publishing stories written by Von Wiegand and other United Press reporters, which angered the St. Louis Times, a client of United Press, and pressured the agency to take legal action.

Meanwhile, The New York World, Pulitzer’s flagship newspaper, had decided to hire Von Wiegand, offering him $200 per week to report from Berlin. After several weeks of deliberation, Von Wiegand accepted the offer. Subsequently, United Press dropped the lawsuit, as it was pursuing legal action against a newspaper that had already secured the employment of the journalist at the center of the controversy.

On April 11, 1915, The New York World published an interview conducted by correspondent Von Wiegand with pope Benedict XV. This interview was a significant publicity event for the newspaper, being noted by The Editor and Publisher as “the second audience of the kind granted by a Pope in the modern history of the church.”

In July 1916, Von Wiegand, alongside nine other correspondents, filed a protest against British censorship concerning American journalists' reporting from Germany during World War I. He reported that out of 72 news dispatches he submitted, only 21 were published by The New York World, indicating that the majority had been suppressed by British censors.

In January 1917, while visiting the United States, von Wiegand announced his departure from The New York World. According to Ralph Pulitzer, Von Wiegand chose to disregard instructions from the newspaper to remain in Berlin and not return to the U.S. Cyril Brown subsequently succeeded him as the German correspondent for the publication. After his departure from The New York World Von Wiegand was hired by International News Service as its correspondent in Berlin.

== Interwar career ==
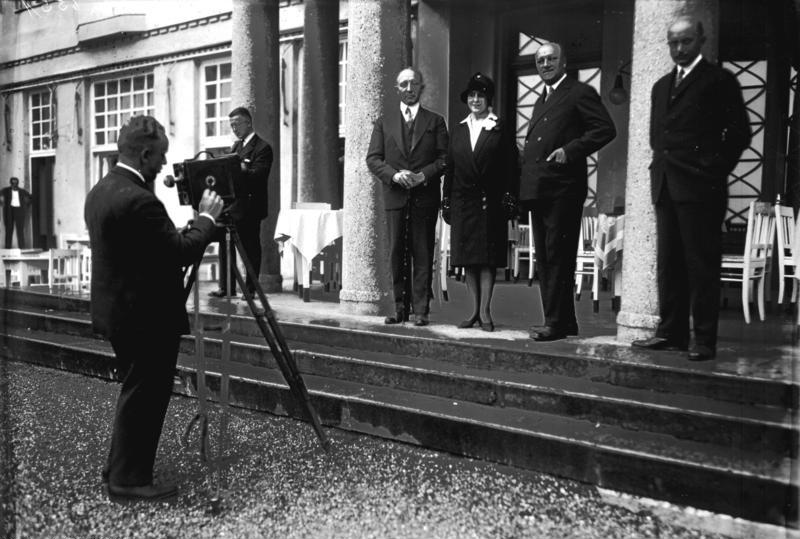
Journalists being photographed before a launch of the Graf Zeppelin, left to right: Karl H. von Wiegand, Lady Drummond-Hay, Rolf Brand, and Robert Hartmann

He was one of the Hearst Press reporters on at least two of the Graf Zeppelin flights, usually accompanying fellow Hearst reporter Lady Hay Drummond-Hay.

=== Hitler coverage ===
Von Wiegand was one of the first American journalists to interview Hitler, having first met him in 1921 while he was only a minor malcontent in post-World War I Munich. He was one of the first journalists to take Hitler seriously, and his story was published on November 12, 1922, a year before the Beer Hall Putsch. As such, Von Wiegand provided the first introduction Americans had to Hitler. He referred to him as the "German Mussolini", and expressed genuine concern about his popularity, writing "The shadow of the Fascisti is arising in Germany. Whether what is yet only a shadow will clothe itself in the flesh, blood and spirit of the German Mussolini, depends on a number of things." He also emphasized his "man of the people" qualities, his charisma, and his electrifying speaking ability. He pegged him as a potentially great leader, saying "Hitler has the earmarks of a leader. Whether it be merely a band or a great movement, only the future will tell."

== World War II and afterward ==
A month after Germany invaded France in World War II, Wiegand secured an interview with Hitler and published his report "Europe for the Europeans: Adolf Hitler on the international situation during the war in France; An interview granted to Karl v. Wiegand, Führer's Headquarters, June 11, 1940".

Later, Lady Drummond-Hay and Wiegand were interned in a Japanese camp in Manila, Philippines. When they were set free in 1943, she was very ill. They returned to the United States, but during their stay in New York Drummond-Hay died of coronary thrombosis in the Lexington Hotel. After her cremation, Karl brought her ashes back to the United Kingdom.

He died of pneumonia in Zurich in 1961 at the age of 86.

== Personal life ==
Karl von Wiegand was the father of journalist (also for Hearst's Newspapers) and abstract painter Charmion von Wiegand.

== Sources ==
- Andreas Elter (April 2003), Die andere Front: Pressepolitik in den USKriegen des 20. Jahrhunderts (PDF) (in German), Cologne, archived from the original (PDF) on 18 July 2011 Doctorate dissertation
- Goldstein, Benjamin S. “‘A Legend Somewhat Larger than Life’: Karl H. von Wiegand and the Trajectory of Hearstian Sensationalist Journalism*.” Historical Research 94, no. 265 (August 1, 2021): 629–59. https://doi.org/10.1093/hisres/htab019.
- Institute for Research in Biography (1948). World Biography, Volume 2. Institute for Research in Biography.
- Rhodes, Richard (2007). Masters of Death: The SS-Einsatzgruppen and the Invention of the Holocaust. Knopf Doubleday Publishing Group. ISBN 9780307426802. - Total pages: 368
- "Germany Recks Not Cost of Lives Of Men". The Sun. NYC, New York: Benj. H. Day. August 16, 1914. pp. 1–80. ISSN 1940-7831. OCLC 9406339.
- Wiegand, Karl Henry von (1915). Current misconceptions about the war. New York: The Fatherland corporation, inc. - Total pages: 40
- Zacher, D. (2008). "The Scripps Newspapers Go to War, 1914-18", University of Illinois Press (especially pp. 40–73).
