= S. B. Conger =

American journalist and foreign correspondent

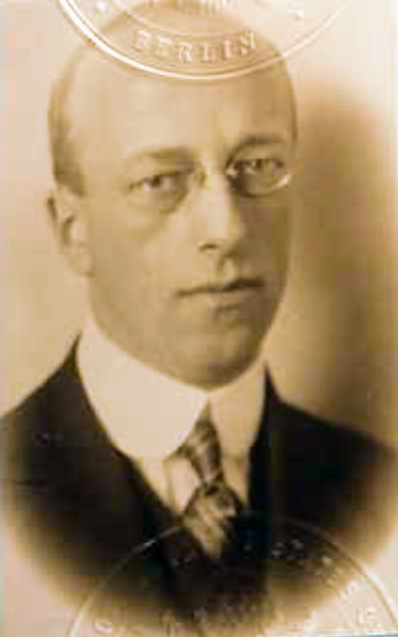
- Born: October 11, 1876; Port Huron, Michigan, US
- Died: July 12, 1934 (aged 57); Ann Arbor, Michigan, US
- Resting place: Lakeside Cemetery, Port Huron, St. Clair County, Michigan, US
- Education: University of Michigan
- Occupations: Journalist, foreign and war correspondent
- Employers: Associated Press; Curtis Publishing Company; Booth Newspapers
- Known for: Reporting from Russia; Reporting from Germany during World War I and Interwar period
- Spouse: Lucile Bailey
- Children: 3

Signature
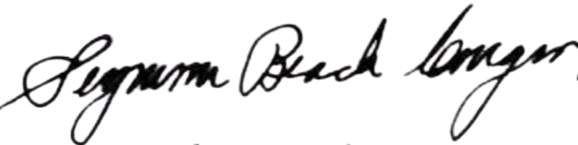

Seymour Beach Conger (October 11, 1876 – July 12, 1934) was an American journalist, foreign and war correspondent. From 1910 to 1917, Conger served as the chief of the Associated Press bureau in Berlin, covering events before and during the First World War.

Conger also covered the Versailles Peace Conference for the Associated Press. After the war, he continued his reporting from Europe, working as a chief foreign correspondent for the Saturday Evening Post, Philadelphia Public Ledger, New York Post, and affiliated newspapers. His base of operations remained in Berlin.

== Early life ==
Conger was born in Port Huron, Michigan, to Clinton Barker and Cornelia E. Conger (née Smith) on October 11, 1876. His father was a well-known locomotive and railway engineer, who worked as an editor for the Railway and Train Engineering and was one of the founders of the Travelling Engineers' Association. For seven years Clinton Barker served as the president of the association and was its treasurer at the time of his death in 1912. His paternal grandfather was Seymour Beach Conger, Civil War Union Army officer. During the Civil War, Seymour Beach Conger served in the 3rd West Virginia Volunteer Cavalry, rising to major and commander of the regiment. He was killed in the Battle of Moorefield in 1864.

Conger received his early education in Grand Rapids High School before attending the University of Michigan. His studies were interrupted by the outbreak of the Spanish-American War in April 1898, during which he served as a private in the 32nd Michigan Volunteers. He resigned from the National Guard as a second lieutenant. After returning from the war, Conger completed his degree at the University of Michigan in 1900.

Before graduation, Conger joined editorial department of the Grand Rapids Press (Michigan). It was his first journalistic experience. In 1903, he earned a master's degree specializing in languages.

== Associated Press ==
Soon after completing his studies, Conger joined the Associated Press. He was assigned to its European service, initially stationed at the London bureau before moving to Saint Petersburg, then the capital of the Russian Empire. Between 1904 and 1910, Conger reported on the Russian side of the Russo-Japanese War and the events of the Russian Revolution of 1905 that led to the establishment of a parliament under tsar Nicholas II.

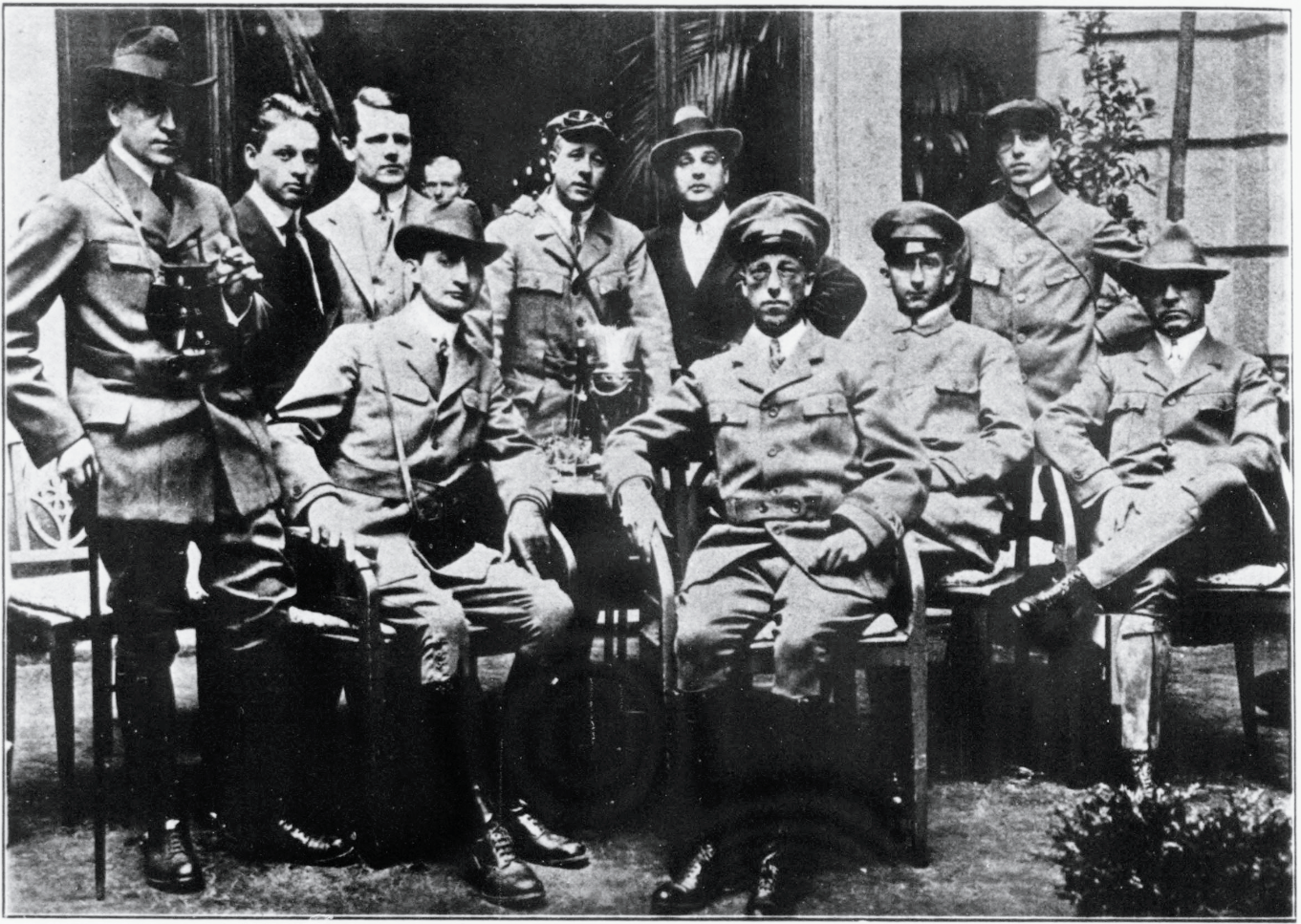
American war correspondents at the Berlin military headquarters of Germany (1915). Left to right: Cyrill Brown, T. K. Meloy, H. J. Reilly, Oswald Schuette, W. H. Durborough, Louis K. Marks (German medical doctor), S. B. Conger, S. M. Bouton, C. W. Ackerman and Karl H. Von Wiegand

In 1910, Conger was appointed director of the Associated Press bureau in Berlin. At the outbreak of World War I in 1914, Conger traveled to the Russian frontier, anticipating early battles, but was arrested by German military officials and detained as a suspected spy. The intervention of the U.S. Ambassador to Germany, James W. Gerard, eventually secured his release.

During the First World War, Conger was one of the few foreign correspondents allowed to accompany German and Austro-Hungarian forces, witnessing major campaigns, including the military campaign of the Masurian lakes alongside Field Marshal Paul von Hindenburg.

Following the United States' entry into the war, Conger stayed in Berlin under precarious circumstances. His work was noted in Ambassador James W. Gerard's memoirs My Four Years in Germany. According to James W. Gerard, Carl W. Ackerman (Associated Press) and Seymour B. Conger were two exceptional American correspondents who deserved special credit for their journalistic work in Germany during the First World War. James W. Gerard noted that in spite of their surroundings and in the face of difficulties, they preserved their "Americanism unimpaired and refused to succumb to the alluring temptations held out to them." He also added he did not mean "to imply that the other correspondents were not loyal, but the pro-Germanism of many of them unfortunately gave the Imperial Foreign Office and the great general staff a wrong impression of Americans."

After returning to the United States, Conger served as a foreign adviser to the War Trade Board in Washington, D.C., where he helped draft blockade restrictions and regulations. He then covered the Paris Peace Conference and the signing of the Treaty of Versailles for the Associated Press.

== Post-war career ==
Post-war, Conger worked as the chief foreign correspondent for Curtis Publishing Company, writing extensively for the Saturday Evening Post, Philadelphia Public Ledger, and New York Post. In the 1920s, he returned to the United States and joined Booth Newspapers, Inc., in Michigan, where he remained until 1930. He then transitioned to a public relations role in New York City, where he became an expert on the St. Lawrence Seaway project and continued to focus on foreign affairs.

== Personal life ==
In 1910, Conger married Lucile Bailey of Leslie, Michigan. In the final years of his life, Conger resided in Ann Arbor, Michigan, where he died on July 12, 1934, at the age of 58. Conger was buried in the Lakeside Cemetery in Port Huron, Michigan.
