= Charmion Von Wiegand =

American painter and journalist

Charmion von Wiegand
- Born: 1896; Chicago, Illinois, U.S.
- Died: June 9, 1983 (aged 86–87); New York City, U.S.
- Known for: Painter, journalist, art critic
- Movement: Neo-Plasticism

Charmion von Wiegand (1896–1983) was an American abstract painter, journalist, writer, collector, benefactor and art critic. She was the daughter of Inez Royce, an artist, and Karl Henry von Wiegand. Karl Henry von Wiegand was the German-born journalist known for wartime reporting.

== Background ==
Von Wiegand was born in Chicago in 1896, grew up in Arizona and California, attended a public school in San Francisco (where she initially became interested in Chinese culture when visiting Chinatown), and lived for three years in Berlin as a teenager. Then she attended Barnard College for a year and then transferred to Columbia University School of Journalism where she studied journalism, before transferring to the Department of Art and Archeology. Later, she studied at New York University with Richard Offner. In college, she explored Theater, Archaeology, Greek, Philosophy and Art History. Nevertheless, she did not complete her bachelor's degree and thought she might become a playwright. Soon after college, von Wiegand married and moved to Darien, Connecticut. The marriage ended shortly with a divorce after her husband moved to Germany.

== Career ==
Von Wiegand started to paint in 1926 while receiving psychoanalytic therapy and encouragement from her friend and painter, Joseph Stella.

She stayed in Moscow, Russia from 1929 to 1932. There, she became a correspondent for the Universal Service of the Hearst Press where her father had been an editor. In Moscow, Charmion von Wiegand saw the Fauve paintings in the Morosof Collection, inspiring her imagination and desire to paint seriously.

When she returned to New York in 1932, she began painting landscapes. In 1931-1934, Von Wiegand became the second wife to the communist activist and co-founder of the journal New Masses Joseph Freeman, to whom she remained married until his death. She wrote a sequence of fourteen art criticism reviews for New Masses, became editor for Art Front, the magazine of the Artist's Union, and several other publications including Federal Art Project (FAP), New Theatre, ARTnews, and Arts Magazine. Von Wiegand herself believed she should not involve herself in too much in politics due to her art, but her critiques often implied a leaning towards Marxism as she claimed the best art was made from the rising class. Her exception was Pablo Picasso, whose works of art she admired yet believed to be confused in ideologies, regressive and lacked humanism.

As part of the cultural avant-garde, she developed a close circle of friends such as John Graham, Carl Holty, Hans Richter, Joseph Stella, and Mark Tobey, all artists who similarly shared a belief that art should be made from physical beauty and spirituality. Von Wiegand continued her work as an art critic, and in the spring of 1941, Carl Holty arranged for her to interview the Dutch artist Piet Mondrian, who was seeking refuge in the United States during World War II and whose work she was familiar with from the Gallatin Collection. She was commissioned to write the first English- language article about Mondrian by The Journal of Aesthetics and Art Criticism. She became close friends with him while helping him translate his essays into English. She watched Mondrian work on both Broadway Boogie Woogie and Victory Boogie Woogie, he influenced her to start creating abstract art and she moved towards Neo-Plasticism. However, she was also heavily influenced into painting abstractly by Hans Richter, the German-born painter, filmmaker and member of the Zurich Dada group; Wassily Kandinsky; Jean Arp; and Joan Miró. Kurt Schwitter's styles, much different from Cubism or Neo- plasticism, was evident around 1946, where she began making collages. She also organized an important show of Schwitter's collages with Naum Gabo and Katherine Dreiser in 1948.

She became an associate member of the American Abstract Artists in 1941, a full member in 1947, exhibited with them from 1948, and later even became its president from 1951 to 1953.

Charmion Von Wiegand became much more interested in Eastern religion and culture Theosophy, Buddhism in the 1950s, oriental styles and drawings such as Egyptian, Chinese, Indian, Hindu Tantric images and she started painting in straight lines by using tape, especially after Mondrian's death in 1944. In the 1950s, von Wiegand turned away from lines, but still made use of the geometric shapes, which were mostly cut from decorative papers of a color range much greater than Mondrian's and often overlapped, varying in size, direction, and paper texture. Her paintings began to contain many more symbols and themes, evident in her geometric forms in symmetrical compositions after her 1972 exhibition at the Birmingham Museum of Art in Alabama.

== Works ==
Von Wiegand's first of more than 21 solo exhibitions was at the Rose Fried Gallery in New York, 1942. She participated in 35 major group exhibitions in the United States, Europe and Far East, including Peggy Guggenheim's 1945 Women's Show at the Art of this Century Gallery in New York. She received the first prize at Cranbook Academy of Art Religious Art Exhibition, Bloomfield Hills Michigan (1969). In 1980, she was elected to the American Academy of Arts and Letters. In 1974, Weigand had a retrospective showing of her work at the Noah Goldowsky Gallery in New York. In 1982, she organized her first retrospective at the Bass Museum of Art in Miami Beach, Florida. In the same year, she received an Honor Award and was exhibited in the Honor Award Exhibition at the National Women's Caucus for Art Conference in New York. Her work is still represented in more than 25 museums and permanent collections including the Andre Zarre Gallery, Michael Rosenfeld Gallery and the Solomon R. Guggenheim Museum, all in Manhattan, New York, the Cleveland Museum of Art in Ohio, the Hirshhorn Museum and Sculpture Garden in Washington, D.C., the Newark Museum in New Jersey, and the Museum of Modern Art (MoMA) in New York.

She lived in an apartment in New York which was covered with her own and her friends' artwork and worked until she became very sick and her friend, a Buddhist refugee with whom she left most of her artworks, cared for until her death on June 9, 1983.

== See also ==
- Hard-edge painting
- Geometric abstraction
