= Clara Adams =

Pioneer female aircraft passenger (1884-1971)

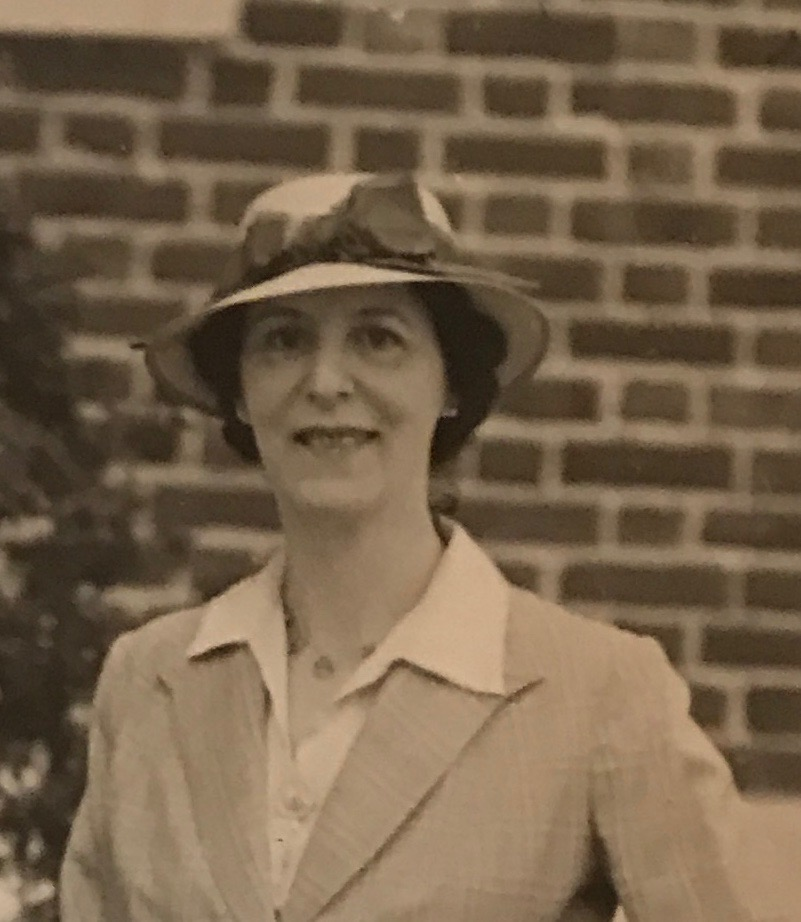
Clara Adams

Clara Adams (née Grabau; December 3, 1884 – February 10, 1971), known as the "first flighter" and the "maiden of maiden flights" was an American aircraft passenger and enthusiast who set a variety of flying records. She helped popularize air travel and was the first woman to fly across the Atlantic as a commercial passenger aboard the Graf Zeppelin.

== Personal life ==
Clara Grabau was born in 1884 in Cincinnati, Ohio to German parents. Her father, Walter Grabau, was a professor of music at the Conservatory of Music in Leipzig, Germany, where she later studied music.

Grabau was married to George Lincoln Adams, who was affluent and served as president of the American Leather Tanning Company. George Adams died in 1929.

Clara Adams died on February 10, 1971.

== Flying ==
In March 1914, Adams embarked on her first flight in Florida on a Thomas flying boat. The flight was piloted by Walter E. Johnson, who would become a captain in the U.S. Army, and reached an altitude of 700 feet, "a daring height in those pioneer days". The flight would spark her interest in aviation.

She was the first passenger on round-trip commercial flights across the Pacific, between New York and Bermuda, and between San Francisco and New Zealand. She is remembered primarily as the first woman to fly across the Atlantic as a ticketed passenger aboard the Graf Zeppelin on its return flight from New York in October 1928. The journalist Grace Marguerite Hay Drummond-Hay flew across the Atlantic, on the outbound flight of the same journey. Adams also was the first woman to fly aboard the Dornier Do X between New York and Rio de Janeiro and she was one of 11 women aboard the maiden flight of the Hindenburg alongside Grace Drummond-Hay. Despite the end of public interest in airships due to the Hindenburg disaster, Adams remained eager to fly on airships.

In 1939, Adams set the unofficial record for passenger travel around the world via commercial air travel. The trip lasted sixteen days and nineteen hours and covered 24,609 miles. She departed from New York on the first flight of the Dixie Clipper across the Atlantic. According to a New York Times reporter, she returned to Newark, NJ, "clad in a tan-plaid tailored suit, made of Chinese silk, purchased in Hong Kong, and wearing a tan Panama straw hat, purchased in Rangoon". She described the journey around the globe as "beautiful beyond description and sublime beyond the most vivid imagination of the human mind".

== Legacy ==
Although Adams was not a pilot, her activities did much to popularize air travel. According to Adams, her journey around the world had demonstrated that air travel was "perfectly safe." She corresponded with the famous female pilot Alys McKey Bryant. The historian Tom Friedman described Adams as "the Forrest Gump of aviation history."
