= LZ 127 Graf Zeppelin =

German rigid airship (1928–1940)

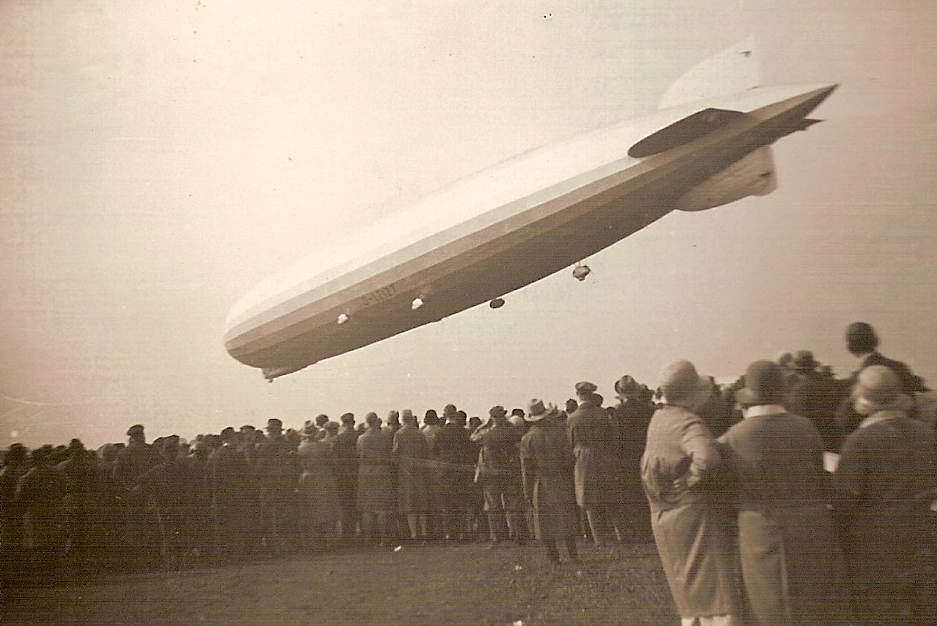
- The Graf Zeppelin landing

General information
- Type: Commercial passenger airship
- National origin: Germany
- Manufacturer: Luftschiffbau Zeppelin
- Designer: Ludwig Dürr
- Status: scrapped March 1940
- Owners: Deutsche Luftschiffahrts-Aktiengesellschaft; from 1935, Deutsche Zeppelin Reederei
- Construction number: LZ 127
- Registration: D-LZ 127
- Radio code: DENNE
- Flights: 590
- Total hours: 17,177
- Total distance: 1.7 million km (1.1 million mi)

History
- Introduction date: 11 October 1928
- First flight: 18 September 1928
- Retired: 18 June 1937

LZ 127 Graf Zeppelin (Deutsches Luftschiff Zeppelin 127) was a German passenger-carrying hydrogen-filled rigid airship that flew from 1928 to 1937. It offered the first commercial transatlantic passenger flight service. The ship was named after the German airship pioneer Ferdinand von Zeppelin, a count (Graf) in the German nobility. It was conceived and operated by Hugo Eckener, the chairman of Luftschiffbau Zeppelin.

Graf Zeppelin made 590 flights totalling almost 1.7 million kilometres (over 1 million miles). It was operated by a crew of 36 and could carry 24 passengers. It was the longest and largest airship in the world when it was built. It made the first circumnavigation of the world by airship, and the first nonstop crossing of the Pacific Ocean by air; its range was enhanced by its use of Blau gas as a fuel. It was built using funds raised by public subscription and from the German government, and its operating costs were offset by the sale of special postage stamps to collectors, the support of the newspaper magnate William Randolph Hearst, and cargo and passenger receipts.

After several long flights between 1928 and 1932, including one to the Arctic, Graf Zeppelin provided a commercial passenger and mail service between Germany and Brazil for five years. When the Nazi Party came to power, they used Graf Zeppelin as a propaganda tool. The airship was withdrawn from service after the Hindenburg disaster in 1937 and scrapped for military aircraft production in April 1940.

== Background ==
The first successful flight of a rigid airship, Ferdinand von Zeppelin's LZ1, was in Germany in 1900. Between 1910 and 1914, Deutsche Luftschiffahrts-Aktiengesellschaft (DELAG) transported thousands of passengers by airship. During World War I, Germany used airships to bomb London and other strategic targets. In 1917, the German LZ 104 (L 59) was the first airship to make an intercontinental flight, from Jambol in Bulgaria to Khartoum and back, a nonstop journey of 6,800 kilometres (4,200 mi; 3,700 nmi). (Note: L 59 was tasked to deliver supplies to German forces fighting in East Africa. The mission was cancelled, and it returned to Jamboli.)

During and just after the war, Britain and the United States built airships, and France and Italy experimented with confiscated German ones. In July 1919 the British R34 flew from East Fortune in Scotland to New York and back. (Note: In 1921 Britain's Imperial Airship Scheme aimed to connect the British Empire using passenger airships.) Luftschiffbau Zeppelin delivered LZ 126 to the US Navy as a war reparation in October 1924. The company chairman Hugo Eckener commanded the delivery flight, and the ship was commissioned as USS Los Angeles (ZR-3).

The Treaty of Versailles placed limits on German aviation which the Allies relaxed in 1925. Eckener saw an opportunity to start an intercontinental air passenger service, and began lobbying the government for funds and permission to build a new civil airship. Public subscription raised 2.5 million ℛ︁ℳ︁ (the equivalent of US$600,000 at the time, or $11 million in 2018 dollars), and the government granted over 1 million ℛ︁ℳ︁ ($5 million).

== Design and operation ==
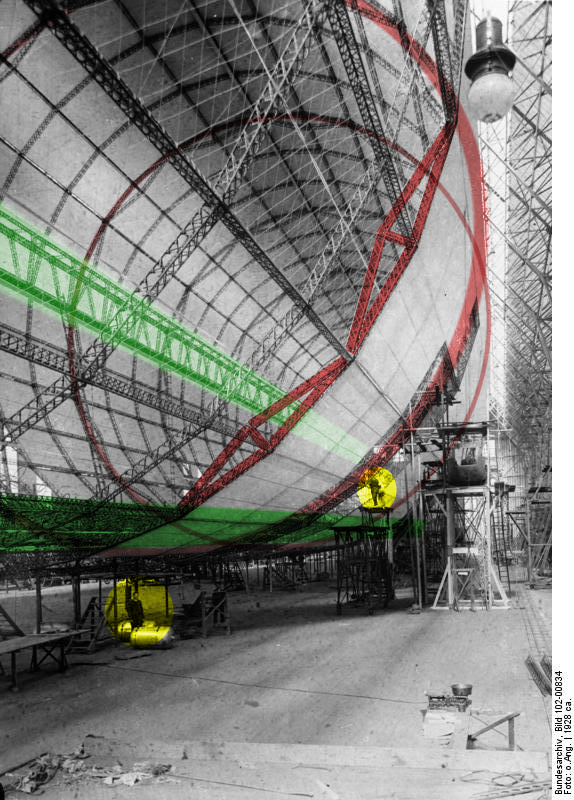
Construction of Graf Zeppelin in Friedrichshafen: the keel and axial gangways are highlighted green with main rings in red; two people are shown in yellow.

The LZ 127 was designed by Ludwig Dürr as a "stretched" version of the zeppelin LZ 126 rechristened the USS Los Angeles). It was intended from the beginning as a technology demonstrator for the more capable airships that would follow. It was built between 1926 and September 1928 at the Luftschiffbau Zeppelin works in Friedrichshafen, on Lake Constance, Germany, which became its home port for nearly all of its flights. Its duralumin frame was made of eighteen 28-sided structural polygons joined lengthwise with 16 km (10 miles) of girders and braced with steel wire. The outer cover was of thick cotton, painted with aircraft dope containing aluminium to reduce solar heating, then sandpapered smooth. The gas cells were also cotton, lined with goldbeater's skins, and protected from damage by a layer containing 27 km (17 miles) of ramie fibre.

Graf Zeppelin was 236.6 m (776 ft) long and had a total gas volume of 105,000 m^{3} (3,700,000 cu ft), of which 75,000 m^{3} (2,600,000 cu ft) was hydrogen carried in 17 lifting gas cells (Traggaszelle), and 30,000 m^{3} (1,100,000 cu ft) was Blau gas in 12 fuel gas cells (Kraftgaszelle). (Note: Blau gas was a mixture of saturated and unsaturated hydrocarbons and hydrogen, produced by pyrolysis of fuel oil. It was about as heavy as air, and could be substituted with a mixture of propane and hydrogen.) The Graf Zeppelin was built to be the largest possible airship that could fit into the company's construction hangar, with only 46 cm (18 in) between the top of the finished vessel and the hangar roof. It was the longest and most voluminous airship when built, (Note: Its volume record was beaten by the British airship R101 in October 1929, and its length by USS Akron in 1931.) but it was too slender for optimum aerodynamic efficiency, and there were worries that the shape would compromise its strength.

Graf Zeppelin was powered by five Maybach VL II 12-cylinder 410 kW (550 hp) engines, each of 33.251 L (2,029.1 cu in) capacity, mounted in individual streamlined nacelles (Note: One of the nacelles is preserved and displayed at Zeppelin Museum Friedrichshafen.) arranged so that each was in an undisturbed airflow. The engines were reversible, and were monitored by crew members who accessed them during flight via open ladders. The two-bladed wooden pusher propellers were 3.4 m (11 ft) in diameter, and were later upgraded to four-bladed units. On longer flights, the Graf Zeppelin often flew with one engine shut down to conserve fuel.

Graf Zeppelin was the only rigid airship to burn Blau gas; the engines were started on petrol (Note: The liquid fuel used was a blend of commercial petrol and benzole.) and could then switch fuel. A liquid-fuelled airship loses weight as it burns fuel, requiring the release of lifting gas, or the capture of water from exhaust gas or rainfall, to avoid the vessel climbing. Blau gas was about the same density as air, so burning it had little effect on buoyancy. On a typical transatlantic journey, the Graf Zeppelin used Blau gas 90% of the time, only burning petrol if the ship was too heavy, and used ten times less hydrogen per day than the smaller zeppelin L 59 did on its Khartoum flight in 1917. (Note: The amount of Blau gas the airship carried could power it for 100 hours; if the ship had had all-hydrogen gas cells and the extra lift had been used to carry petrol, it could have run for only 67.)

Graf Zeppelin typically carried 3,500 kg (7,700 lb) of ballast water and 650 kg (1,430 lb) of spare parts, including an extra propeller. Calcium chloride was added to the ballast water to prevent freezing. The ship retained grey water from the sinks for use as additional ballast. Both fresh and wastewater could be moved forward and aft to control trim.

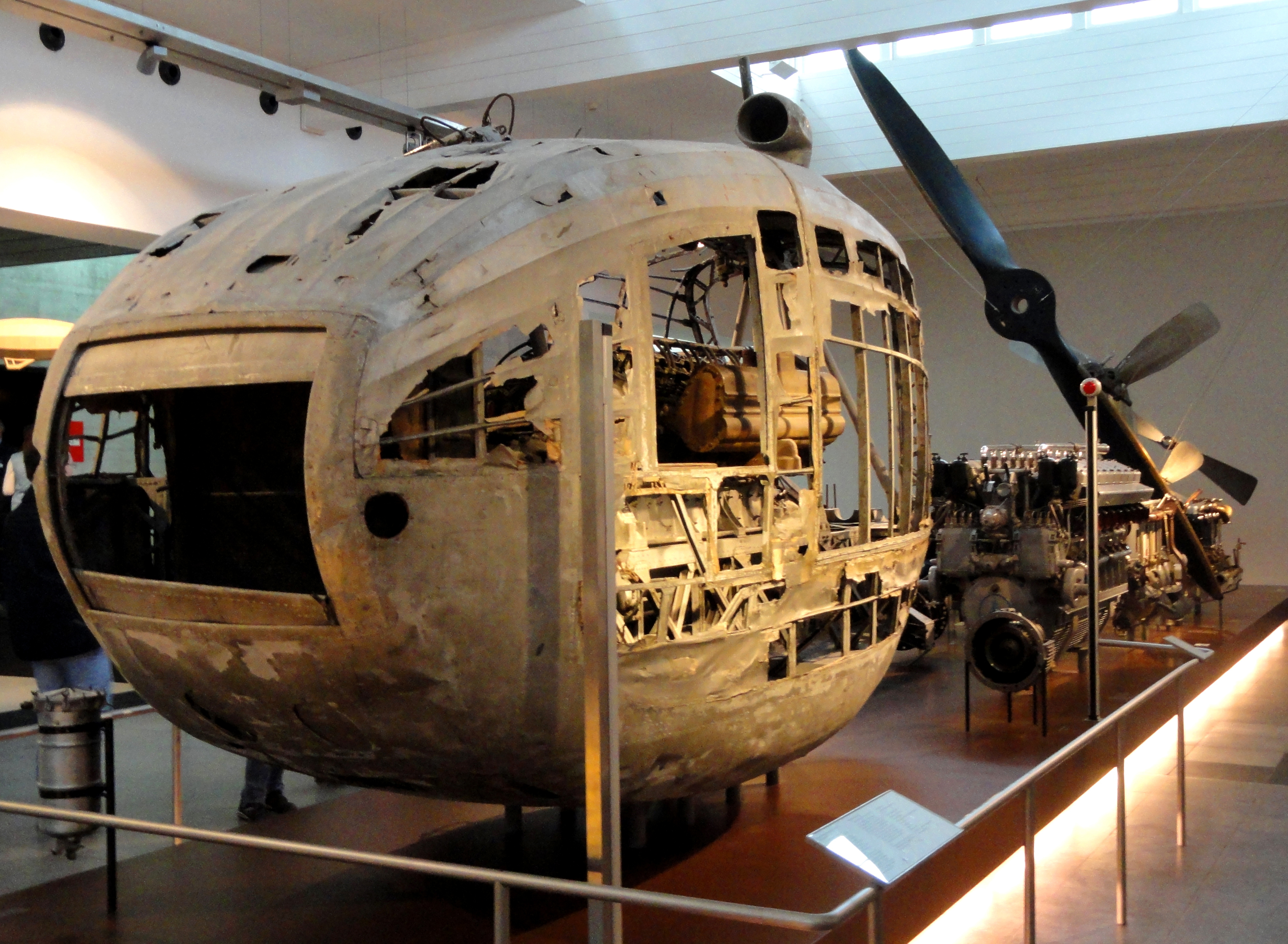
One of the engine nacelles, preserved in Zeppelin Museum Friedrichshafen

The airship usually took off vertically using static lift (buoyancy), then started the engines in the air, adding aerodynamic lift. Normal cruising altitude was 200 m (650 ft); it climbed if necessary to cross high ground or poor weather, and often descended in stormy weather. To measure the wind speed over the sea, and calculate drift, floating pyrotechnic flares were dropped.

When preparing to land, the crew advised the ground either by radio or signal flag. Ground crew lit a smoky fire to help the airshipmen judge wind speed and direction. The airship slowed, then adjusted buoyancy to neutral by valving off hydrogen or dropping ballast. Echo sounding with the report from an 11-mm blank round was used to measure altitude accurately. (Note: This was later replaced by a device using compressed air to produce a burst of ultrasound, which was less disturbing for the passengers.) The ship flew in with its nose trimmed slightly down, made its final approach into the wind descending at 30 m (100 ft) per minute, then used reverse thrust to stop over the landing flag, where it dropped ropes to the ground. Landing in rough weather required a faster approach. Up to 300 people manhandled the airship into a hangar or secured it by the nose to a mooring mast.

Graf Zeppelin's top airspeed was 128 km/h (36 m/s; 80 mph; 69 kn) at 1,980 kW (2,650 hp); it cruised at 117 km/h (33 m/s; 73 mph; 63 kn), at 1,600 kW (2,150 hp). It had a total lift capacity of 87,000 kg (192,000 lb) with a usable payload of 15,000 kg (33,000 lb) on a 10,000 km (6,200 mi; 5,400 nmi) flight. It was slightly unstable in yaw, and to make it easier to fly, had an automatic pilot which stabilised it in that axis. Pitch was controlled manually by an elevatorman who tried to limit the angle to 5° up or down, so as not to upset the bottles of wine which accompanied the elaborate food served on board. Operating the elevators was so demanding and strenuous that an elevatorman's shift was only four hours, reduced to two in rough weather.

=== Layout ===
Gondola deck plan

The operational spaces, common areas, and passenger cabins were built into a gondola structure in the forward part of the airship's ventral surface, with the flight deck well forward in a "chin" position. The gondola was 30 metres (98 ft) long and 6 metres (20 ft) wide; its streamlined design reflected contemporary aesthetics, minimised overall height, and reduced drag. Behind the flight deck was the map room, with two large hatches to allow the command crew to communicate with the navigators, who could take readings with a sextant through the two large windows. There was also a radio room and a galley with a double electric oven and hot plates.

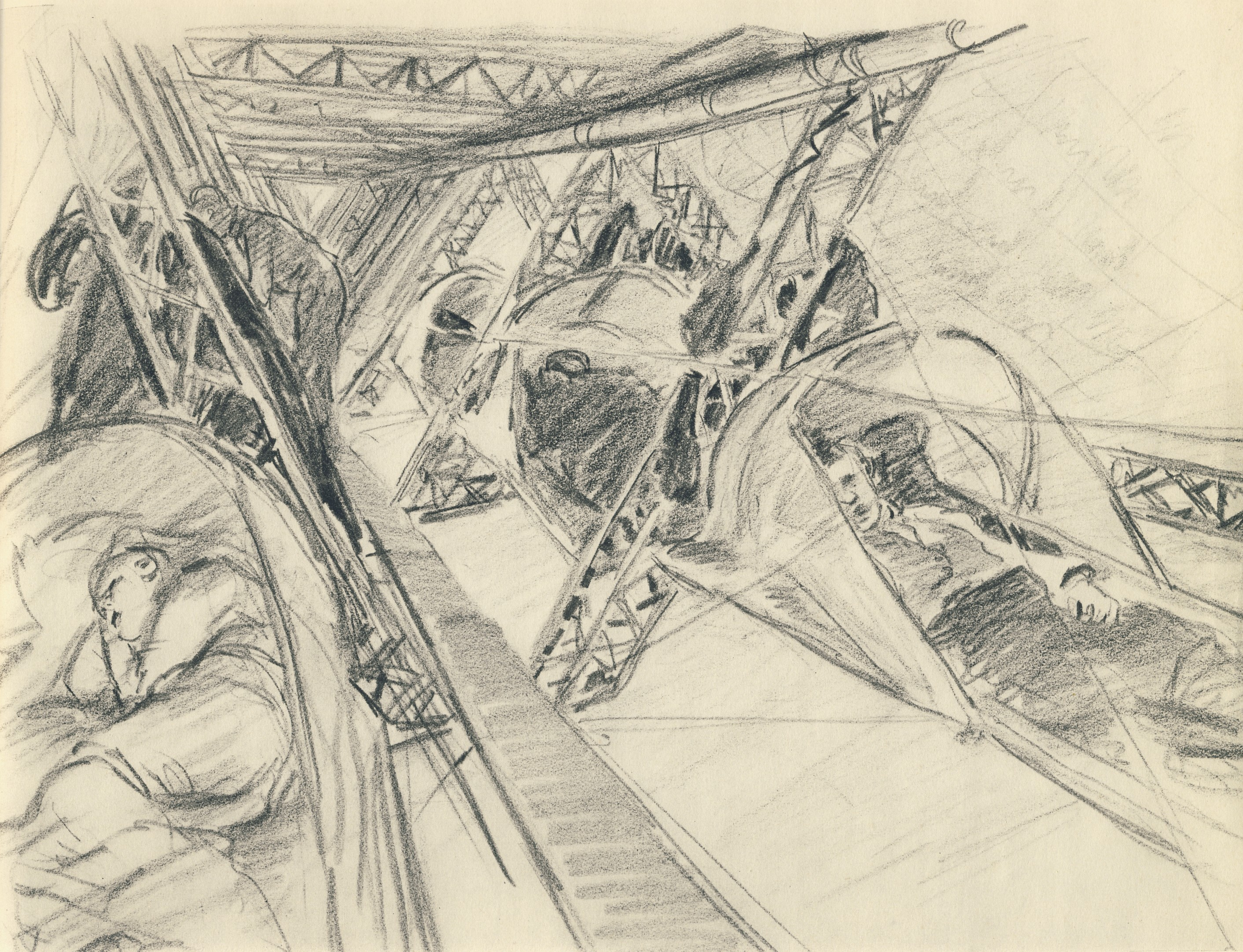
Theo Matejko's drawing of the crew accommodation on the keel corridor from the first transatlantic flight

The galley staff served three hot meals a day in the main dining and sitting room, which was 5 metres (16 ft) square. It had four large arched windows, wooden inlays, and Art Deco-upholstered furniture. Between meals, the passengers could socialise and look at the scenery. On the round-the-world flight, there was dancing to a phonograph, fine wine, and Ernst Lehmann, one of the officers, played the accordion. A corridor led to ten passenger cabins capable of sleeping 24, a pair of washrooms, and dual chemical toilets. The passenger cabins were set by day with a sofa, which converted at night into two beds. The cabins were often cold, and on some sectors passengers wore furs and huddled under blankets to stay warm. There was a noticeable smell from the Blau gas, especially when the ship was stationary.

A ladder from the map room led up to the keel corridor inside the hull and accommodation for the 36 crewmen. Officers' quarters were towards the nose; behind them were the baggage store, the crew mess room, and the quarters for the ordinary crew, who slept in wire-frame beds with fabric screens. Also along this corridor were petrol, oil and water tanks, and stowage for cargo and spare parts. Branches from the keel corridor led to the five engine nacelles, and there were ladders up to the axial corridor, just below the ship's main axis, which gave access to all the gas cells.

=== Electrical and communications systems ===
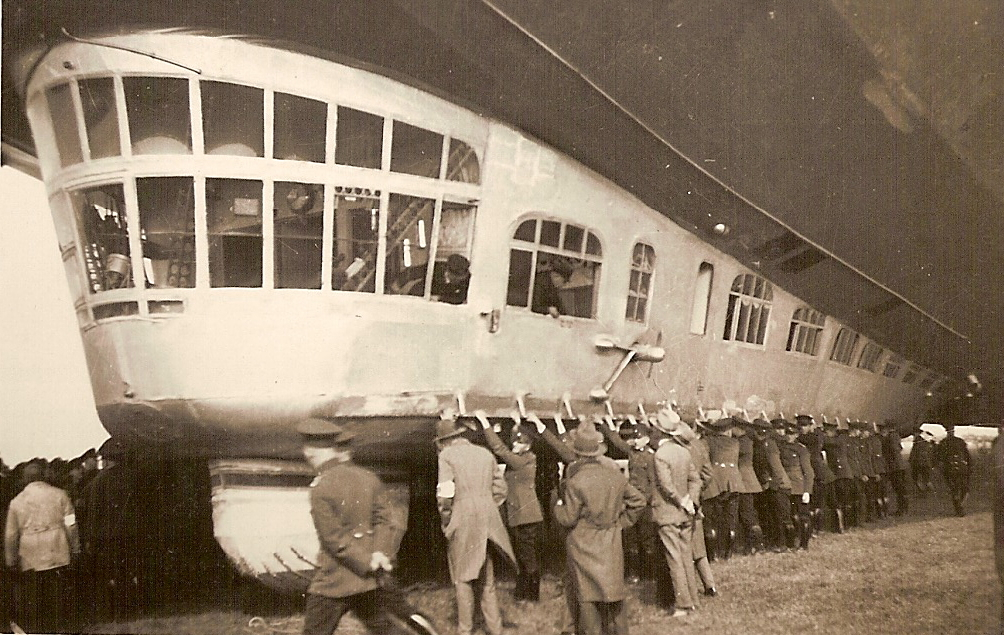
Many people were needed to hold down the airship. The ram air turbine electric generator is just under the radio room window.

The main generating plant was in a separate compartment mostly inside the hull. Two 8.9 kW (12 hp) Wanderer car engines adapted to burn Blau gas, only one of which operated at a time, drove two Siemens & Halske dynamos each. One dynamo on each engine powered the oven and hotplates, and one the lighting and gyrocompass. Cooling water from these engines heated radiators inside the passenger lounge. Two ram air turbines attached to the main gondola on swinging arms provided electrical power for the radio room, internal lighting, and the galley. Batteries could power essential services like radios for half an hour, and there were small petrol generators for emergency power.

Three radio operators used a one-kilowatt vacuum tube transmitter (about 140 W antenna power) to send telegrams over the low frequency (500–3,000 m) bands. A 70 W antenna power emergency transmitter carried telegraph and radio telephone signals over 300–1,300 m wavelength bands. The main aerial consisted of two lead-weighted 120-metre (390 ft)-long wires deployed by electric motor or hand crank; the emergency aerial was a 40-metre (130 ft) wire stretched from a ring on the hull. Three six-tube receivers served the wavelengths from 120 to 1,200 m (medium frequency), 400 to 4,000 m (low frequency) and 3,000 to 25,000 m (overlapping low frequency and very low frequency). The radio room also had a shortwave receiver for 10 to 280 m (high frequency).

A radio direction finder used a loop antenna to determine the airship's bearing from any land radio station, or a ship with a known position. Two or more bearings would give the airship's position. During the first transatlantic flight in 1928, the radio room sent 484 private telegrams and 160 press telegrams.

== Operational history ==
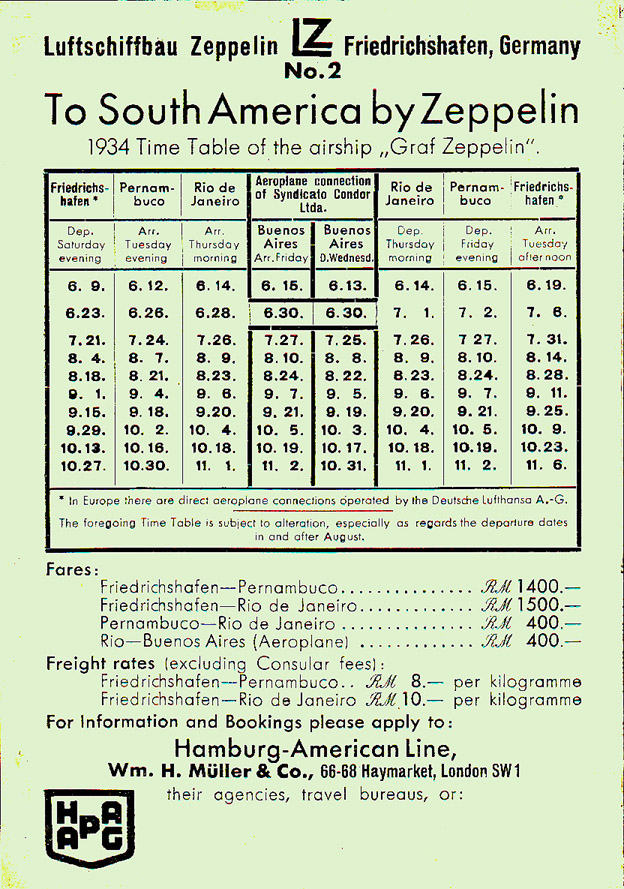
1934 South America timetable

The LZ 127 was christened Graf Zeppelin by Countess Brandenstein-Zeppelin on 8 July 1928, after her father, Ferdinand von Zeppelin, the founder of the company, on the 90th anniversary of his birth. During most of its career, it was operated by Luftschiffbau Zeppelin's commercial flight arm, DELAG, in conjunction with the Hamburg-American Line (HAPAG); for its final two years it flew for the Deutsche Zeppelin Reederei (DZR).

Passengers paid premium fares to fly on the Graf Zeppelin (1,500 ℛ︁ℳ︁ from Germany to Rio de Janeiro in 1934, equal to US$590 then, or $14,000 in 2025), and fees collected for valuable freight and air mail also provided income. On the first transatlantic flight, Graf Zeppelin carried 66,000 postcards and covers.

Eckener had earned his doctorate in Psychology at Leipzig University under Wilhelm Wundt, and could use his knowledge of mass psychology to the benefit of the Graf Zeppelin. He identified safety as the most important factor in the ship's public acceptance, and was ruthless in pursuit of this. He took complete responsibility for the ship, from technical matters, to finance, to arranging where it would fly next on its years-long public relations campaign, in which he promoted "zeppelin fever". On one of the Brazil trips British Pathé News filmed on board. Eckener cultivated the press, and was gratified when the British journalist Lady Grace Drummond-Hay wrote, and millions read, that:

The Graf Zeppelin is a ship with a soul. You have only to fly in it to know that it's a living, vibrant, sensitive and magnificent thing.

Graf Zeppelin was greeted by large crowds on most of its early voyages. There were 100,000 at Moscow and possibly 250,000 at Tokyo to see it. At Stockholm, spectators launched firework rockets around it, and on the return flight from Moscow it was punctured by rifle shots near the Soviet Union-Lithuania border. On one visit to Rio de Janeiro people released hundreds of small toy petrol-burning hot air balloons near the flammable craft. The airship captured the public imagination and was used extensively in advertising. On visits to England, it photographed Royal Air Force bases, the Blackburn aircraft factory in Yorkshire, and the Portsmouth naval dockyard; it is likely that this was espionage at the behest of the German government.

=== Proving flights ===
During 1928, there were six proving flights. On the fourth one, Blau gas was used for the first time. Graf Zeppelin carried Oskar von Miller, head of the Deutsches Museum; Charles E. Rosendahl, commander of USS Los Angeles; and the British airshipmen Ralph Sleigh Booth and George Herbert Scott. It flew from Friedrichshafen to Ulm, via Cologne and across the Netherlands to Lowestoft in England, then home via Bremen, Hamburg, Berlin, Leipzig and Dresden, a total of 3,140 kilometres (1,950 mi; 1,700 nmi) in 34 hours and 30 minutes. On the fifth flight, Eckener caused a minor controversy by flying close to Huis Doorn in the Netherlands, which some interpreted as a gesture of support for the former Kaiser Wilhelm II who was living in exile there.

=== First intercontinental flight (1928) ===
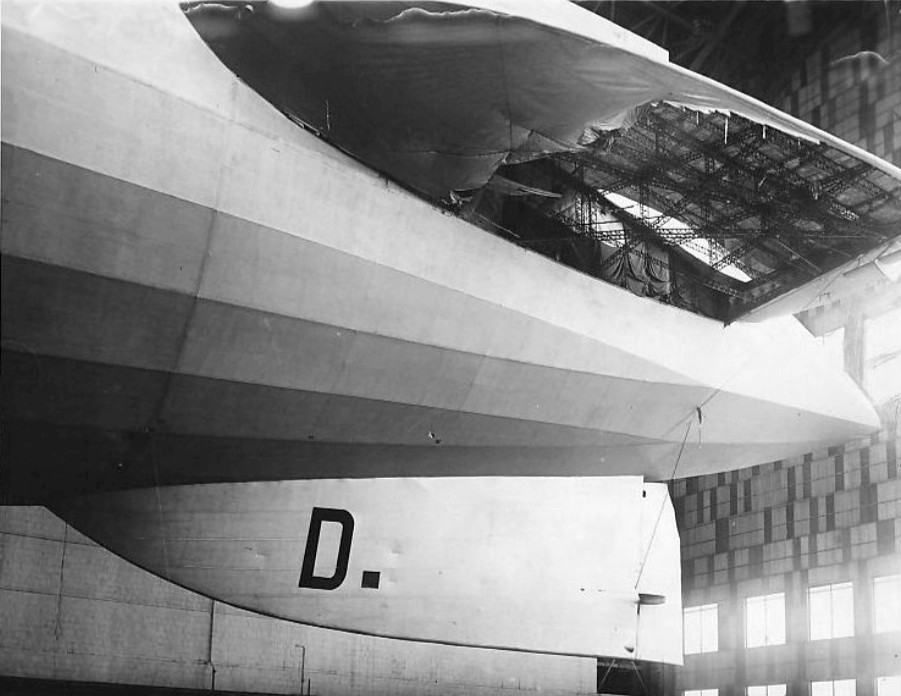
Graf Zeppelin in Lakehurst, with damage to the port fin after hitting a squall line, 16 October 1928

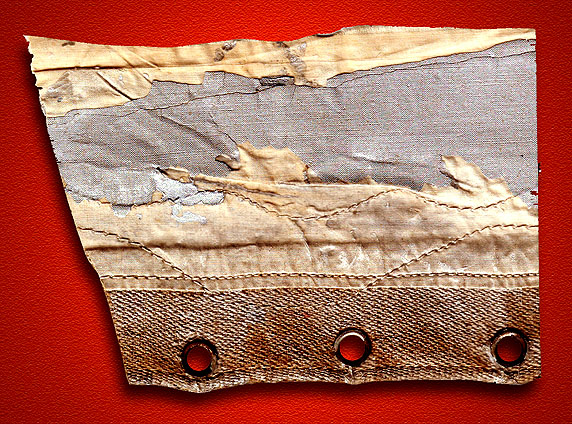
A piece of the damaged fabric removed from Graf Zeppelin in October 1928

In October 1928, Graf Zeppelin made its first intercontinental trip, to Lakehurst Naval Air Station, New Jersey, US, with Eckener in command and Lehmann as first officer. (Note: Lehmann commanded most of Graf Zeppelin's flights, 272 to Eckener's 133. Four other captains commanded a total of 100 flights.) Rosendahl and Drummond-Hay flew the outward leg. Ludwig Dettmann and Theo Matejko made an artistic record of the flight.

On the third day of the flight, a large section of the fabric covering of the port tail fin was damaged while passing through a mid-ocean squall line, and volunteer riggers (including Eckener's son, Knut) climbed outside the airship and made repairs to the torn fabric. Eckener directed Rosendahl to make a distress call; when this was received, and nothing else was heard from the airship, many believed it was lost. After the ship arrived safely, there was some annoyance from the Lakehurst personnel that the Zeppelin had not answered repeated calls for its position and estimated arrival time. Eckener explained that because the airship was forced to fly at a reduced speed due to the damaged fin, the wind-driven generator could not generate enough power to send messages. The 9,926 km (6,168 mi; 5,360 nmi) crossing, the longest non-stop flight at the time, had taken 111 hours 44 minutes.

Clara Adams became the first female paying passenger to fly transatlantic on the return flight. The ship endured an overnight gale that blew it backwards in the air and 320 km (200 mi; 170 nmi) off course, to the coast of Newfoundland. A stowaway boarded at Lakehurst and was discovered in the mail room mid-voyage. The airship returned home and on 6 November flew to Berlin Staaken, where it was met by the German president, Paul von Hindenburg.

=== Mediterranean flights (1929) ===
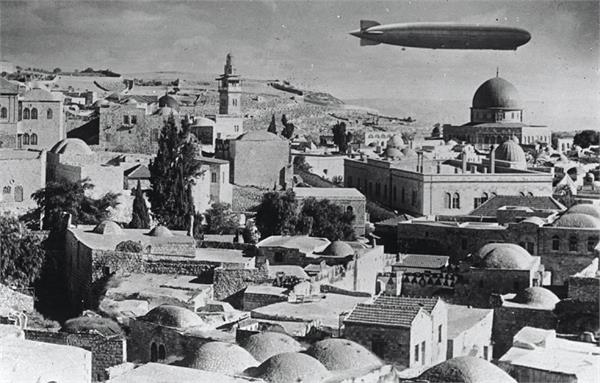
Graf Zeppelin over Jerusalem on 26 March 1929

Graf Zeppelin visited Mandatory Palestine in late March 1929. At Rome it sent greetings to Benito Mussolini and King Victor Emmanuel III. It entered Palestine, flew over Haifa, Jaffa, Tel Aviv and Jerusalem, and descended to near the surface of the Dead Sea, 150 metres below sea level. The ship delivered 16,000 letters in mail drops at Jaffa, Ramla, Athens, Budapest and Vienna. The Egyptian government (under pressure from Britain) refused it permission to enter their airspace. The second Mediterranean cruise flew over France, Spain, Portugal and Tangier, then returned home via Cannes and Lyon on 23–25 April.

=== Forced landing in France (1929) ===
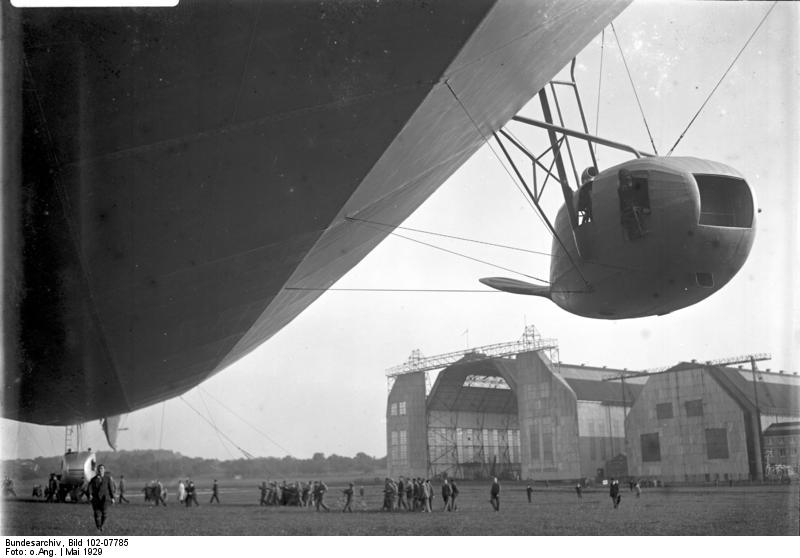
Emergency landing in France, May 1929

On 16 May 1929, on the first night of its second trip to the US, Graf Zeppelin lost four of its engines. With Eckener struggling for a suitable place to force-land, the French Air Ministry allowed him to land at Cuers-Pierrefeu, near Toulon. Barely able to control the ship, Eckener made an emergency landing. The incident, and the forced comradeship it engendered, softened France's attitude to Germany and its airships slightly. The incident was caused by adjustments that had been made by the chief engineer to the four engines that failed.

On 4 August, the airship made it to Lakehurst on the second attempt. Aboard was Susie, an eastern gorilla who had been captured near Lake Kivu in the Belgian Congo and sold by her German owner to an American dealer.

=== Round-the-world flight (1929) ===
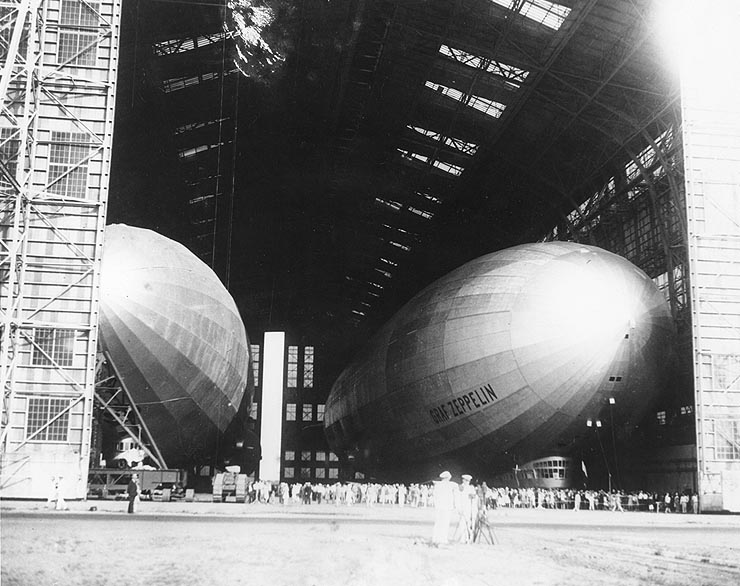
Graf Zeppelin and USS Los Angeles in the airship hangar at NAS Lakehurst, August 1929

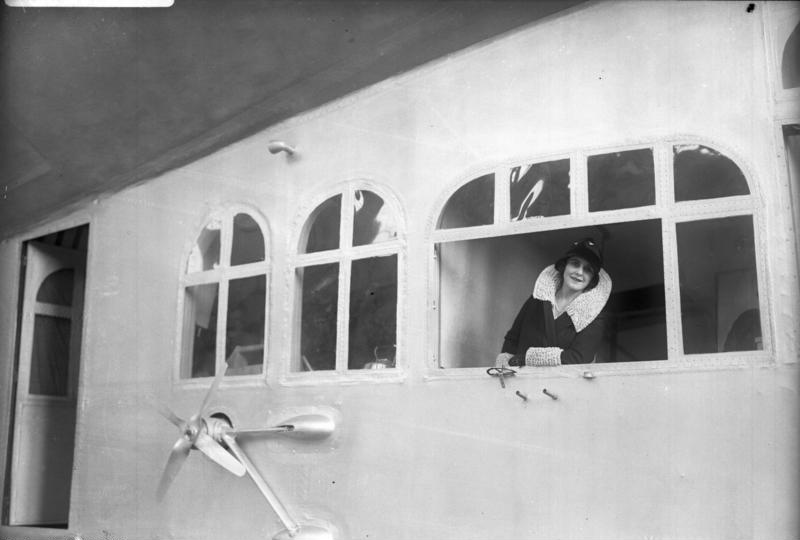
Drummond-Hay on board the Graf Zeppelin, August 1929

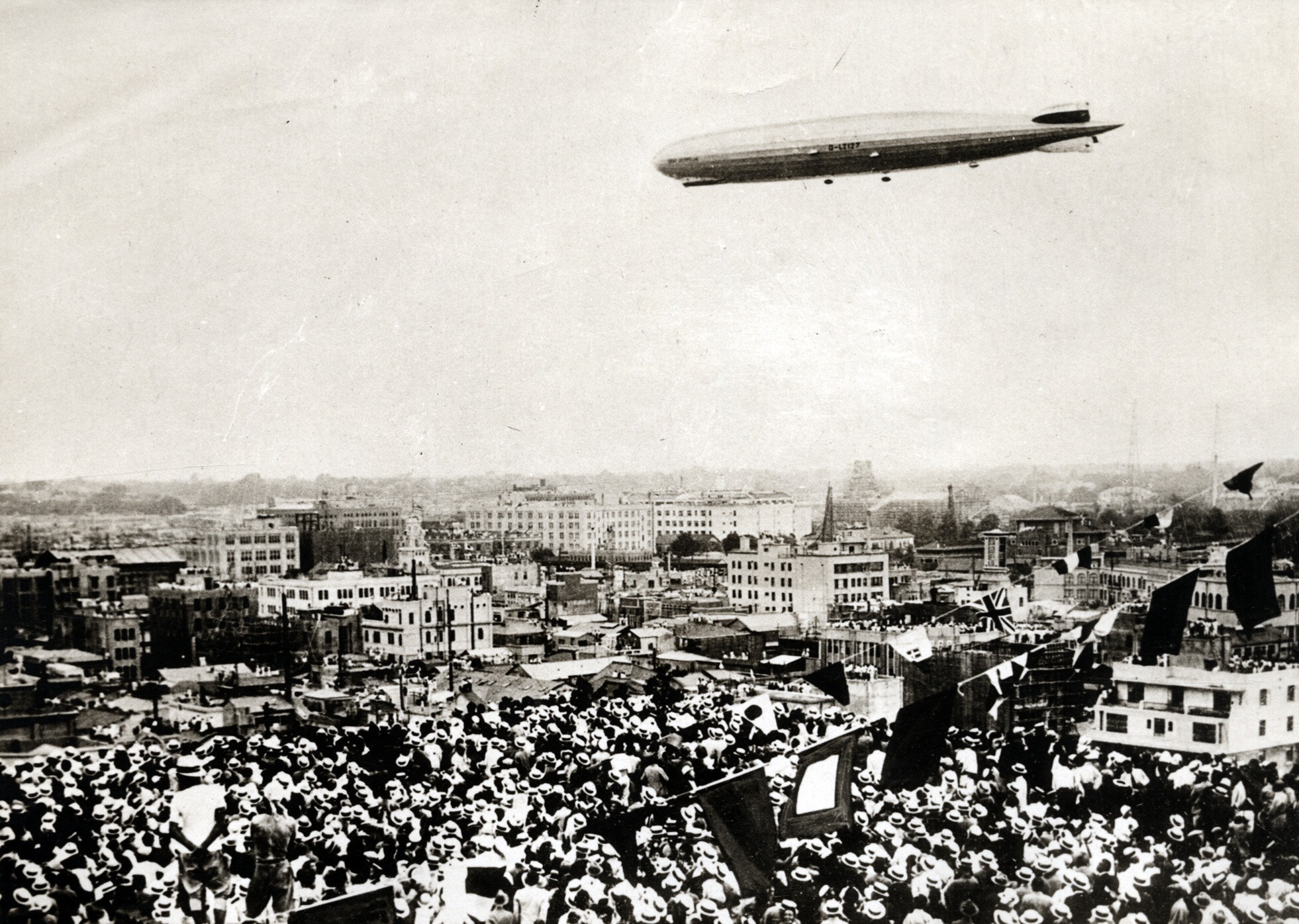
Graf Zeppelin over Tokyo on 19 August 1929

American newspaper publisher William Randolph Hearst's media empire paid half the cost of the project to fly Graf Zeppelin around the world, with four staff on the flight: Lady Hay Drummond-Hay, Karl von Wiegand, Australian explorer Hubert Wilkins, and cameraman Robert Hartmann. Drummond-Hay became the first woman to circumnavigate the world by air. (Note: A semidocumentary film titled Farewell was released in 2009 which featured much of Hartmann's newsreel footage of her. The film was later aired on BBC under the title Around The World by Zeppelin.) Hearst stipulated that the flight in August 1929 officially start and finish at Lakehurst. Round-the-world tickets were sold for almost $3000 (equivalent to $56,000 in 2025), but most participants had their costs paid for them. The flight's expenses were offset by the carriage of souvenir mail between Lakehurst, Friedrichshafen, Tokyo, and Los Angeles. A US franked letter flown on the whole trip from Lakehurst to Lakehurst required $3.55 (equivalent to $67 in 2025) in postage.

Graf Zeppelin set off from Lakehurst on 8 August, heading eastwards. The ship refuelled at Friedrichshafen, then continued across Eastern Europe and the Soviet Union to Tokyo. On 19 August, LZ 127 arrived in Tokyo.

After five days at a former German airship shed that had been removed from Jüterbog and rebuilt at Kasumigaura Naval Air Station, Graf Zeppelin continued across the Pacific to California. Eckener delayed crossing the coast at San Francisco's Golden Gate so as to come in near sunset for aesthetic effect. The ship landed at Mines Field in Los Angeles, completing the first ever nonstop flight across the Pacific Ocean. The takeoff from Los Angeles was difficult because of high temperatures and an inversion layer. To lighten the ship, six crew and some cargo were sent on to Lakehurst by aeroplane. The airship suffered minor damage from a tail strike and barely cleared electricity cables at the edge of the field. The Graf Zeppelin arrived back at Lakehurst from the west on the morning of 29 August, three weeks after it had departed to the east.

Flying time for the four Lakehurst to Lakehurst legs was 12 days, 12 hours, and 13 minutes; the entire circumnavigation (including stops) took 21 days, 5 hours, and 31 minutes to cover 33,234 km (20,651 mi; 17,945 nmi). It was the fastest circumnavigation of the globe at the time.

Eckener became the tenth recipient and the third aviator to be awarded the Gold Medal of the National Geographic Society, which he received on 27 March 1930 at the Washington Auditorium. Before returning to Germany, Eckener met President Herbert Hoover, and successfully lobbied the US Postmaster General for a special three-stamp issue (C-13, 14 & 15) for mail to be carried on the Europe-Pan American flight due to leave Germany in mid-May. Germany issued a commemorative coin celebrating the circumnavigation.

=== Europe-Pan American flight (1930) ===
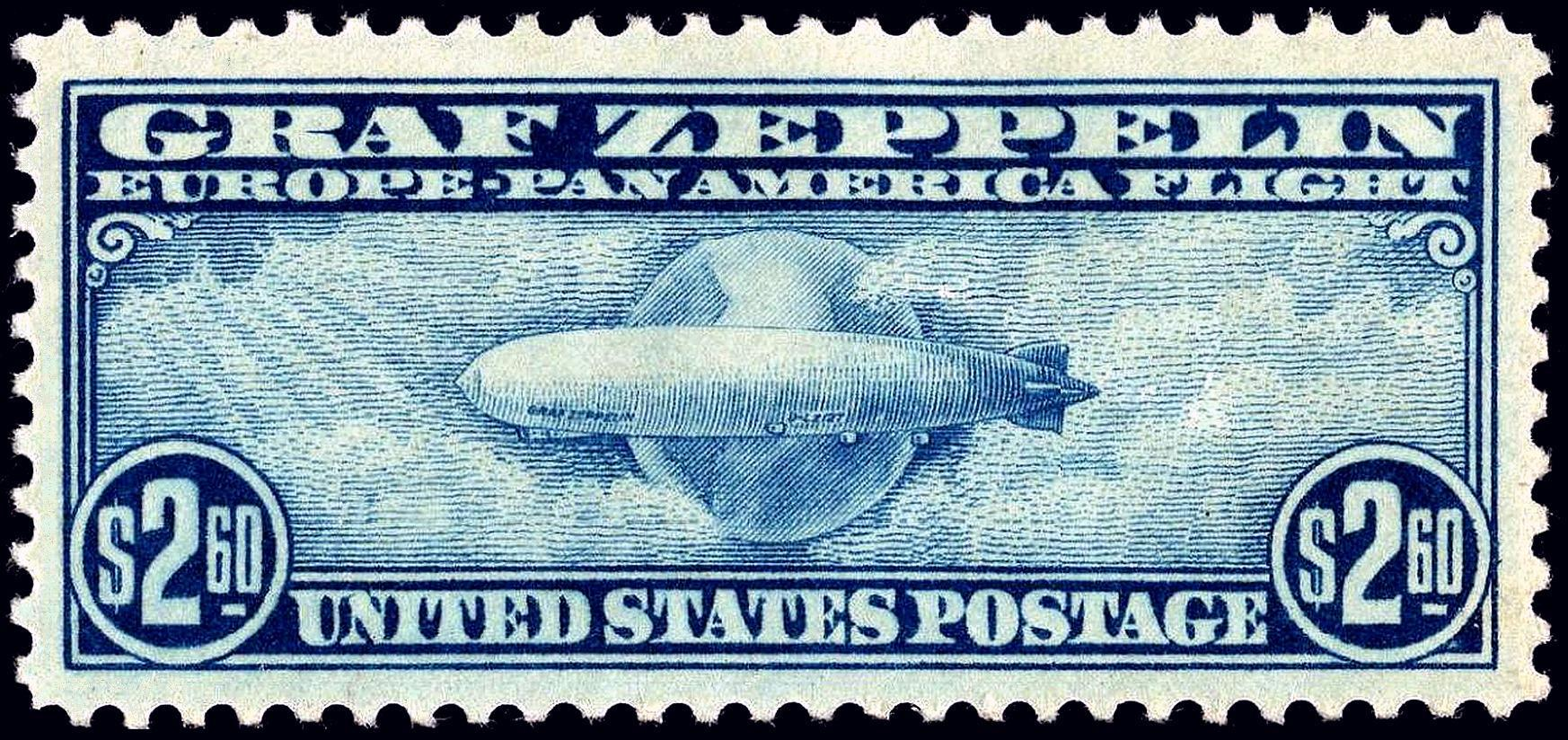
$2.60 Europe-Pan American issue (C-15), 24 April 1930

On 26 April 1930, Graf Zeppelin flew low over the FA Cup Final at Wembley Stadium in England, dipping in salute to King George V, then briefly moored alongside the larger R100 at Cardington. On 18 May, it left on a triangular flight between Spain, Brazil, and the US, carrying 38 passengers, many of them in crew accommodation. The ship arrived at Recife (Pernambuco) in Brazil, docking at Campo do Jiquiá on 22 May, where 300 soldiers helped land it. It then flew to Rio de Janeiro, where there was no post to tether to, so it was held down by the landing party for the two hours of the visit.

During the flight north via Recife to Lakehurst, a storm damaged the rear engine nacelle, which was repaired in the hangar at Lakehurst. During ground handling of the airship there, it suddenly lifted, causing serious injury to one of the US Marines who was assisting. A few hours from home, when the Graf Zeppelin flew through a heavy hailstorm over the Saône, the envelope was damaged, and the ship lost lift. Eckener ordered full power and flew the ship out of trouble, but it came within 60 m (200 ft) of hitting the ground.

The Europe-Pan American flight was largely funded by the sale of special stamps issued by Spain, Brazil, and the US for franking mail carried on the trip. The US issued stamps in three denominations: 65¢, $1.30, and $2.60, all on 19 April 1930.

=== Middle East flight (1931) ===
The second flight to the Middle East took place in 1931, beginning on 9 April. Graf Zeppelin crossed the Mediterranean to Benghazi in Libya, then flew via Alexandria, to Cairo in Egypt, where it saluted King Fuad at the Qubbah Palace, then visited the Great Pyramid of Giza and hovered 20 m (66 ft) above the top of the monument. After a brief stop, the ship flew to Palestine where it circled Jerusalem, then returned to Cairo to pick up Eckener, who had stayed for an audience with the King. It returned to Friedrichshafen on 13 April.

=== Polar flight (1931) ===
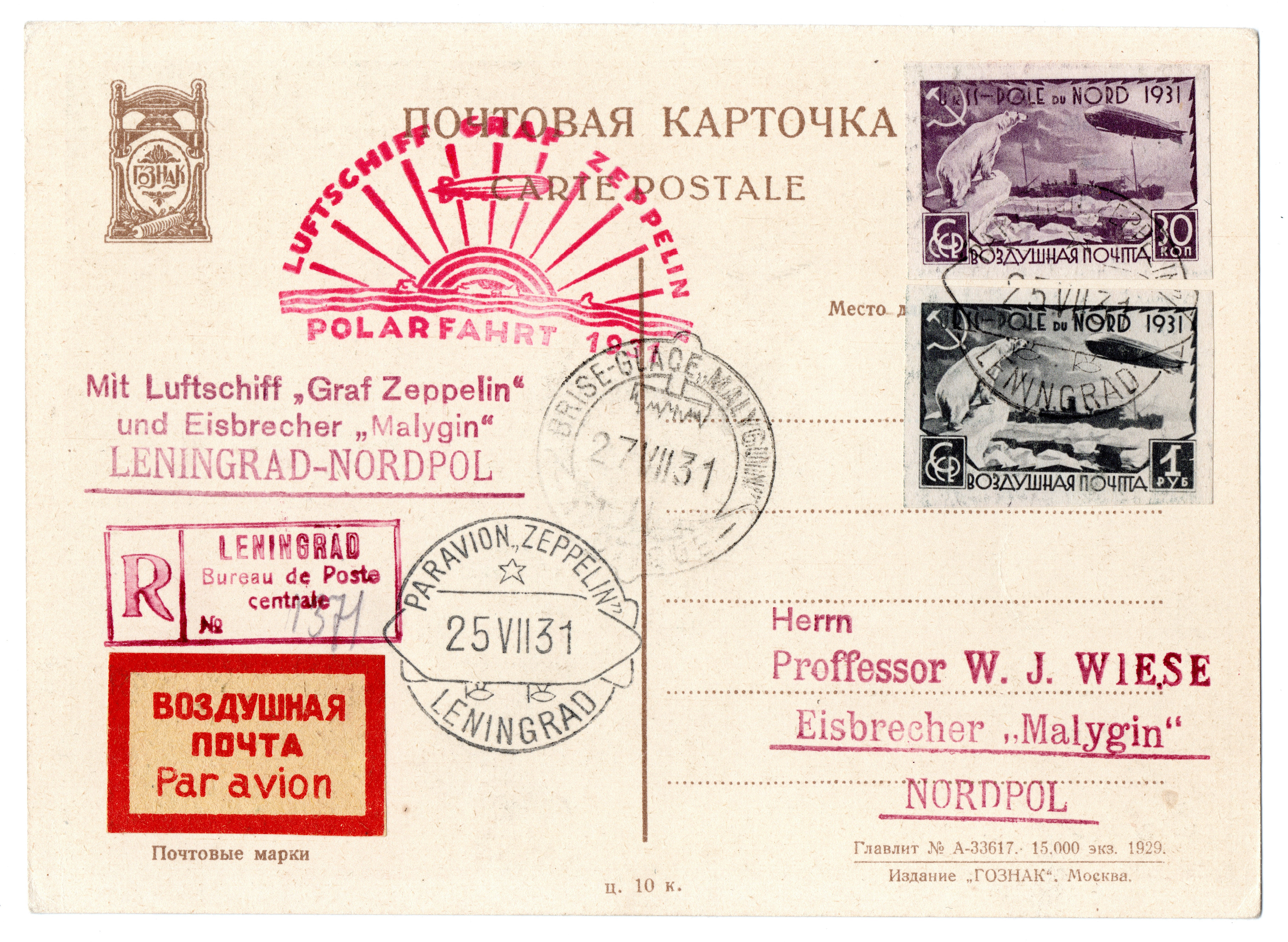
USSR franked postcard delivered to the Malygin

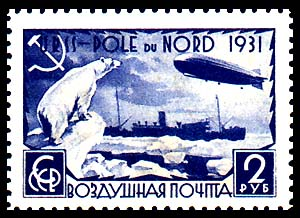
The Graf Zeppelin and icebreaker Malygin on a Soviet stamp (1931)

The polar flight (Polarfahrt 1931) lasted from 24 to 31 July 1931. The ship rendezvoused with the Soviet icebreaker Malygin, which had Italian polar explorer Umberto Nobile aboard. It exchanged 120 kg (260 lb) of souvenir mail with the airship, which Eckener landed on the Arctic Ocean. Fifty thousand cards and letters, weighing 300 kg (660 lb), were carried. The costs of the expedition were met largely by the sale of special postage stamps issued by Germany and the Soviet Union to frank the mail carried on the flight.

Writer Arthur Koestler was one of two journalists on board, along with a multinational team of scientists led by Soviet Professor Samoilowich (ru), who measured the Earth's magnetic field, and a Soviet radio operator. The expedition photographed and mapped Franz Josef Land accurately for the first time, and came within 910 kilometres (570 mi; 490 nmi) of the North Pole. It deployed three early radiosondes over the Arctic to collect meteorological data from the upper atmosphere.

=== South American operations (1931–1937) ===
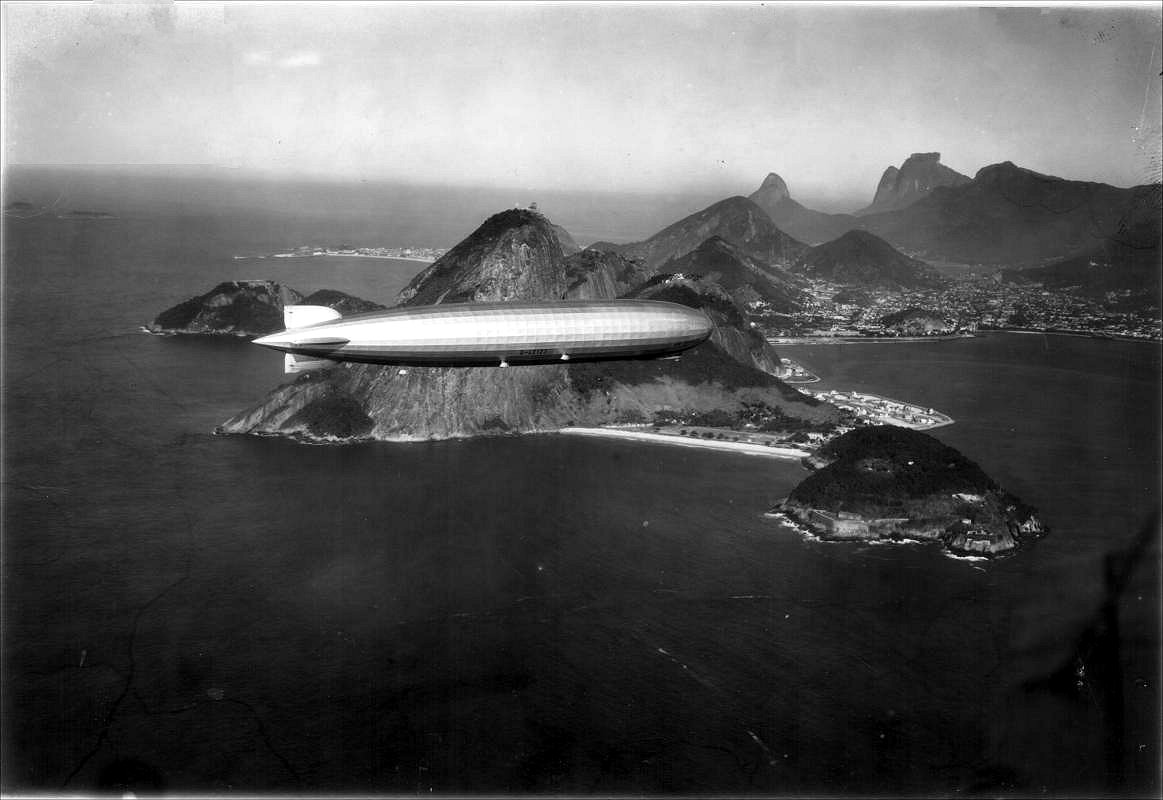
Graf Zeppelin over Rio de Janeiro on 25 May 1930

From the beginning, Luftschiffbau Zeppelin had plans to serve South America. There was a large community of Germans in Brazil, and existing sea connections were slow and uncomfortable. Graf Zeppelin could transport passengers over long distances in the same luxury as an ocean liner, and almost as quickly as contemporary airliners.

Graf Zeppelin made three trips to Brazil in 1931 and nine in 1932. The route to Brazil meant flying down the Rhône valley in France, a cause of great sensitivity between the wars. The French government, concerned about espionage, restricted it to a 12 nmi (22 km; 14 mi)-wide corridor in 1934. Graf Zeppelin was too small and slow for the stormy North Atlantic route, but because of the Blau gas fuel, could carry out the longer South Atlantic service. On 2 July 1932 it flew a 24-hour tour of Britain.

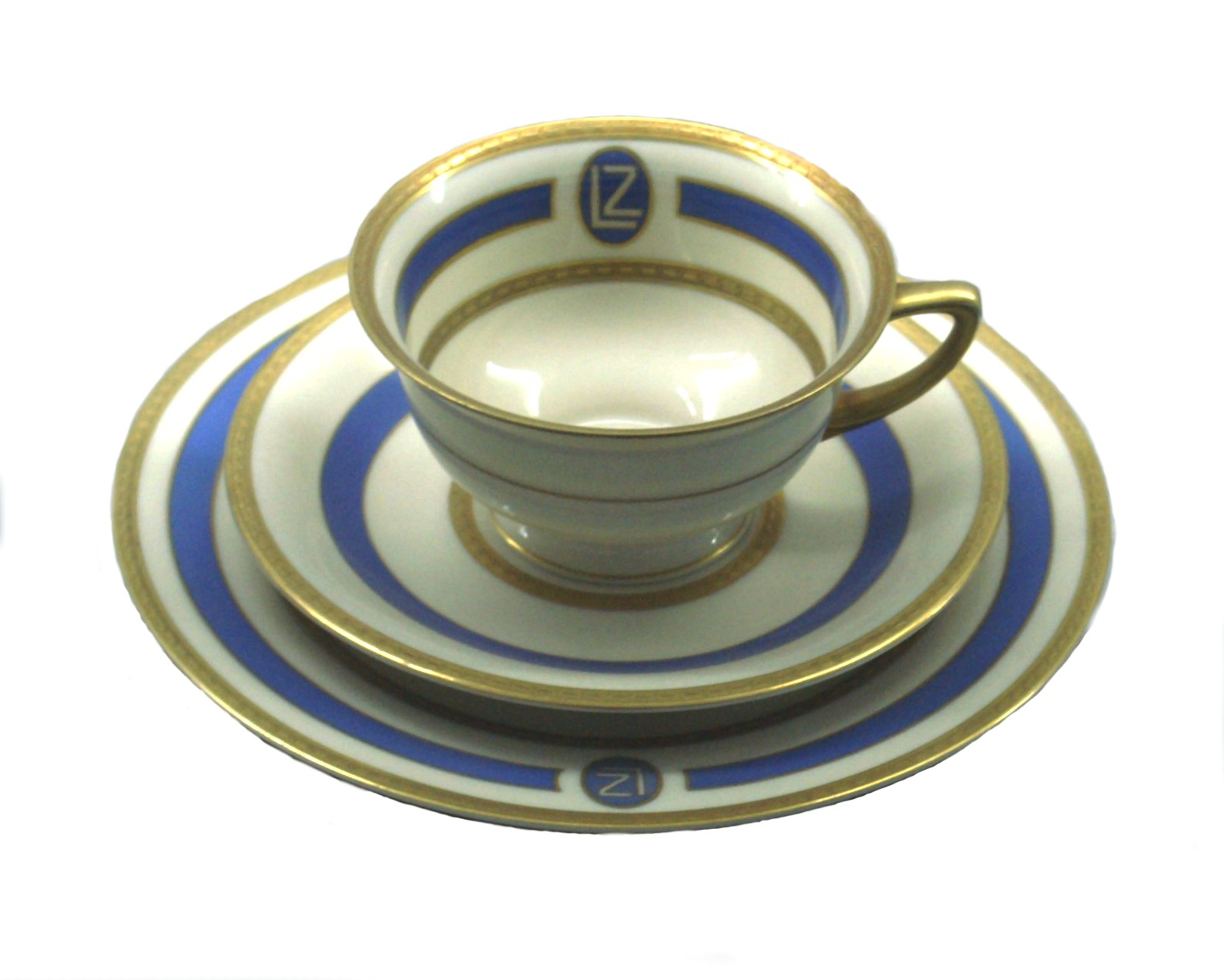
Food and drinks service on board was of a high standard.

While returning from Brazil in October 1933, Graf Zeppelin stopped at NAS Opa Locka in Miami, Florida, and then Akron, Ohio, where it moored at the Goodyear Zeppelin airdock. The airship then appeared at the Century of Progress World's Fair in Chicago. It displayed swastika markings on the left side of the fins, as the Nazi Party had taken power in January. Eckener circled the fair clockwise so that the swastikas would not be seen by the spectators. The United States Post Office Department issued a special 50-cent airmail stamp (C-18) for the visit, which was the fifth and final one the ship made to the US.

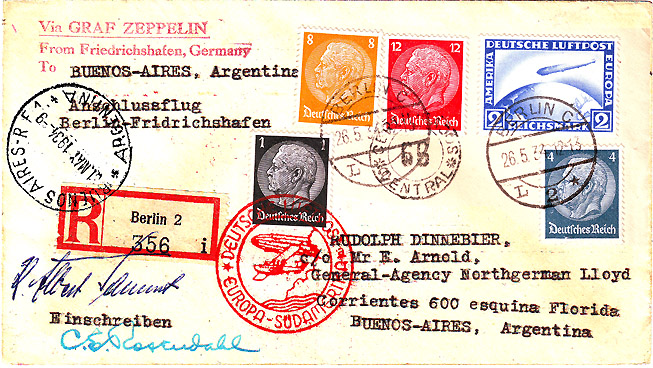
German "First 1934 South America Flight" cover

The airship's cotton envelope absorbed moisture from the air in humid tropical conditions. When the relative humidity reached 90%, the ship's weight rose by almost 1,800 kilograms (4,000 lb). Exposure to tropical downpours could greatly add to this, but when under way the ship had enough reserve power to generate dynamic lift to compensate. In April 1935 it made a rough forced landing at Recife after it was caught in a rainstorm at low speed on the approach to land and the added weight of several tons of water caused it to sink to the ground. The lower rudder was lost, the outer envelope was ripped in several places, and a petrol tank was punctured by a palm tree.

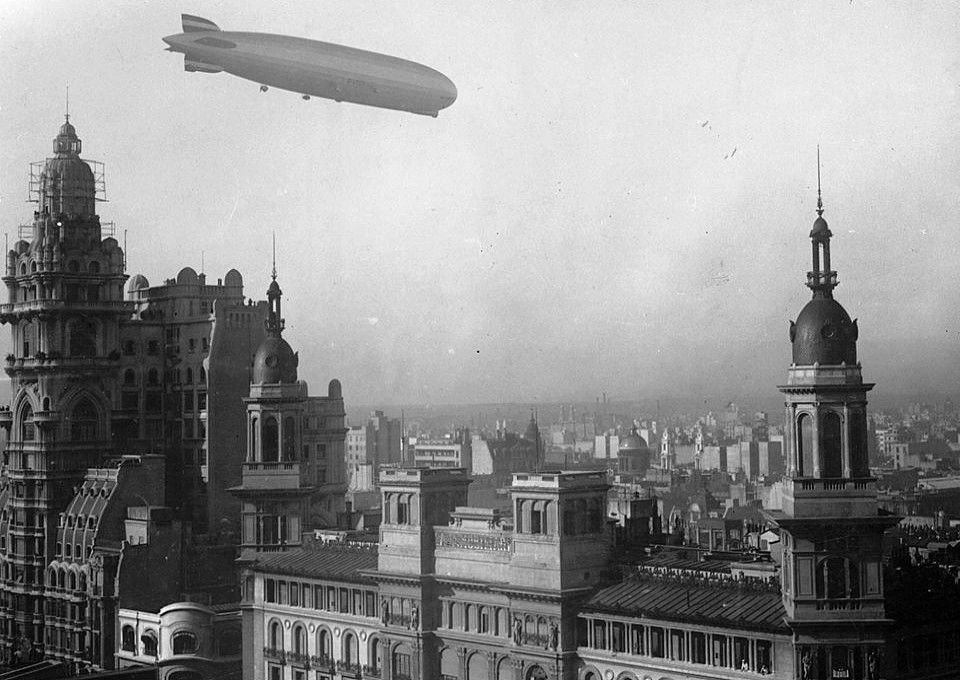
Graf Zeppelin flying near the Barolo Palace in Buenos Aires (1934)

In late 1935 Graf Zeppelin operated a temporary postal shuttle service between Recife and Bathurst, in the British African colony of the Gambia. On 24 November, during the second trip, the crew learned of an insurrection in Brazil, and there was some doubt whether it would be possible to return to Recife. Graf Zeppelin delivered its mail to Maceió, then loitered off the coast for three days until it was safe to land, after a flight of 118 hours and 40 minutes.

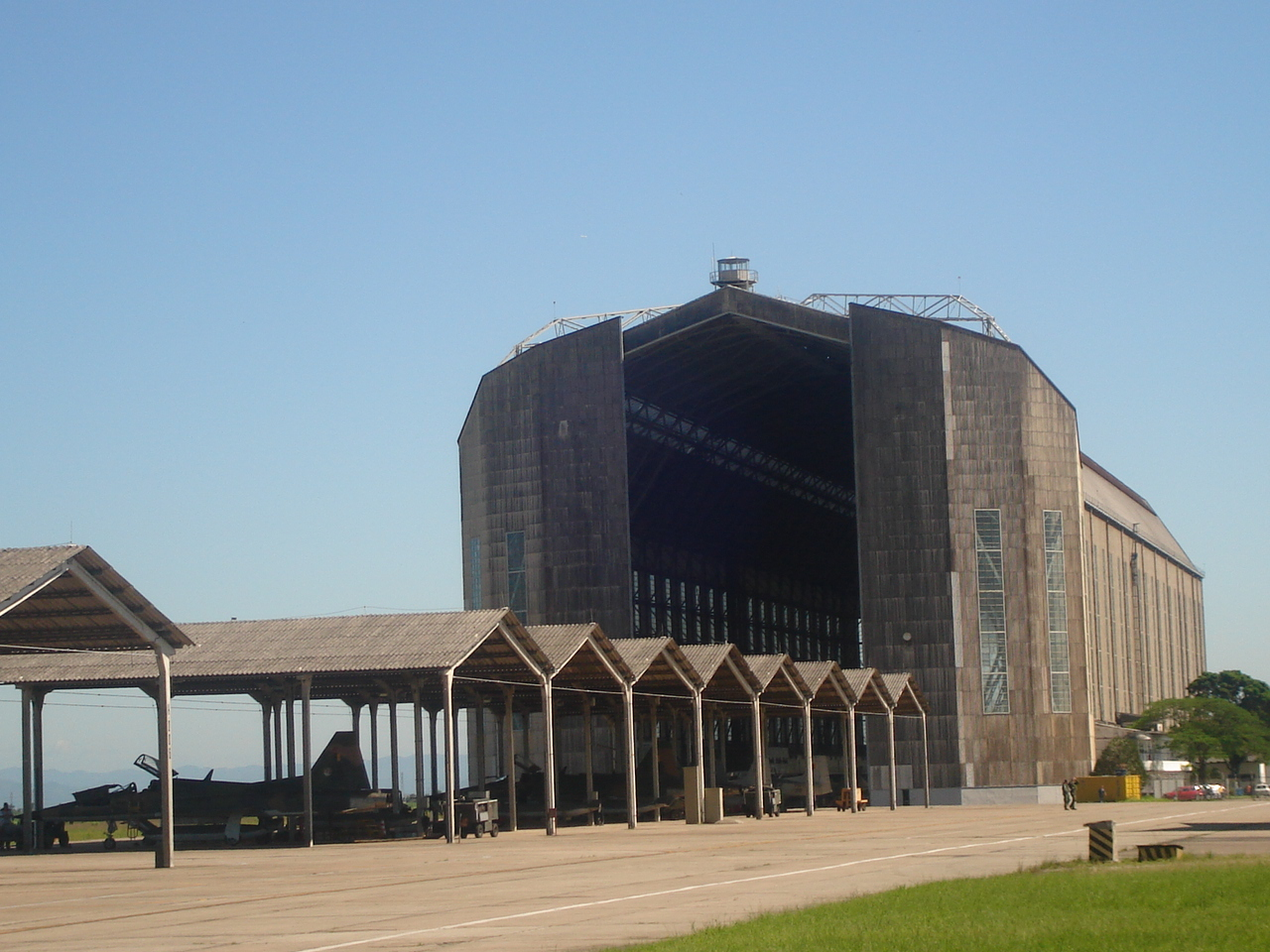
Airship hangar near Rio de Janeiro

Brazil built a hangar for airships at Bartolomeu de Gusmão Airport, near Rio de Janeiro, at a cost of $1 million (equivalent to $23 million in 2025). Brazil charged the DZR $2000 ($46,000 in 2025) per landing, and had agreed that German airships would land there 20 times per year, to pay off the cost. The hangar was constructed in Germany and the parts were transported and assembled on site. It was finished in late 1936, and was used four times by Graf Zeppelin and five by Hindenburg. It now houses units of the Brazilian Air Force.

Graf Zeppelin made 64 round trips to Brazil, on the first regular intercontinental commercial air passenger service, and it continued until the loss of the Hindenburg in May 1937.

=== Propaganda (1936) ===
Eckener was outspoken about his dislike of the Nazi Party, and was warned about it by Rudolf Diels, the head of the Gestapo. When the Nazis gained power in 1933, Joseph Goebbels (Reich Minister of Propaganda) and Hermann Göring (Commander-in-chief of the Luftwaffe) sidelined Eckener by putting the more sympathetic Lehmann in charge of a new airline, Deutsche Zeppelin Reederei (DZR), which operated German airships.

On 7 March 1936, in violation of the Treaty of Versailles and the Locarno Treaties, German troops reoccupied the Rhineland. Hitler called a plebiscite for 29 March to retrospectively approve the reoccupation and adopt a list of exclusively Nazi candidates to sit in the new Reichstag. Goebbels commandeered Graf Zeppelin and the newly launched Hindenburg for the Reich Ministry of Public Enlightenment and Propaganda. The airships flew in tandem around Germany before the vote, with a joint departure from Löwenthal on the morning of 26 March. They toured the country for four days and three nights, dropping propaganda leaflets, playing martial music and slogans from large loudspeakers, and broadcasting political speeches from a makeshift radio studio on Hindenburg.

== Retirement and aftermath ==
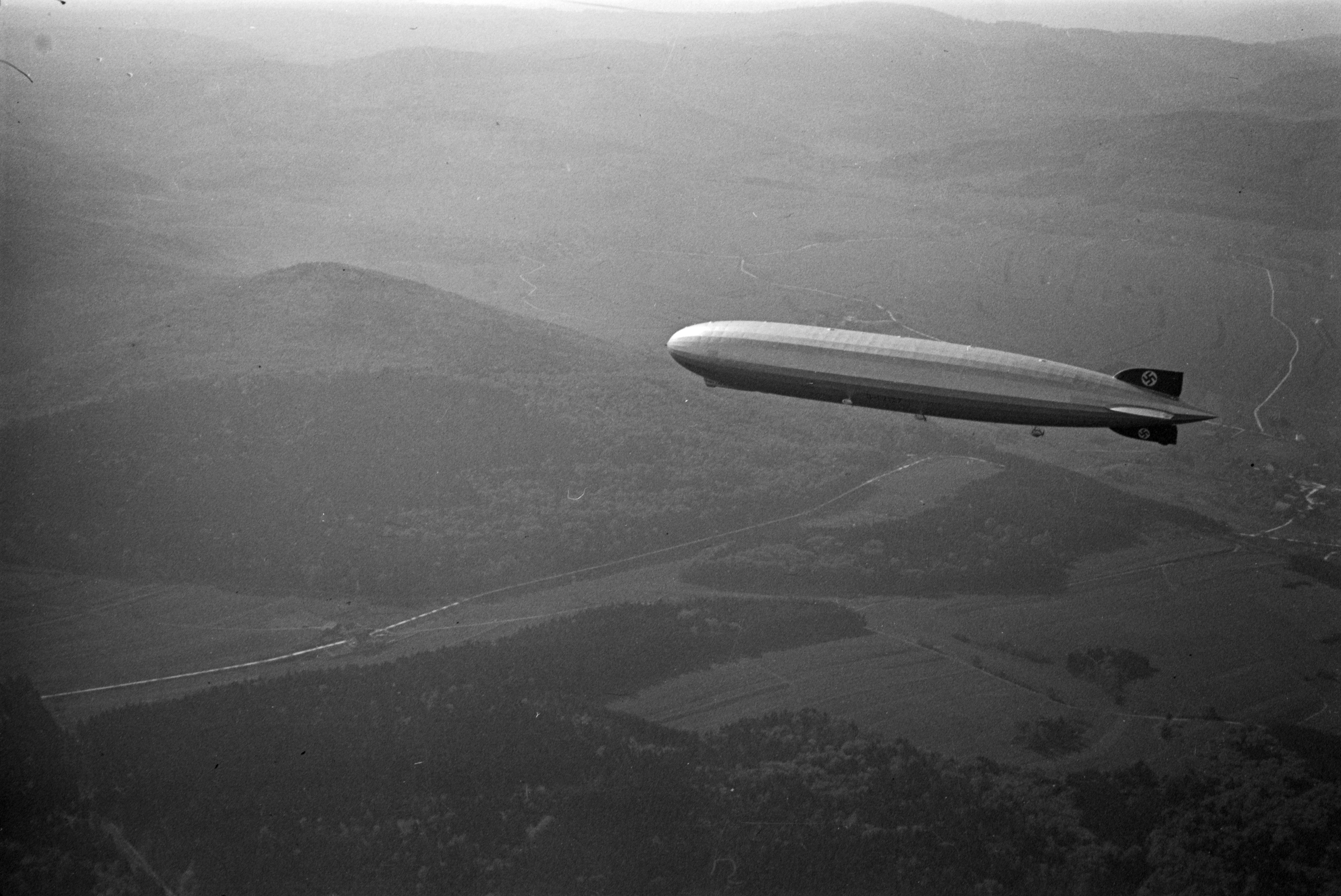
Graf Zeppelin flying over Germany later in its career, with swastikas on the tail fins

The crew heard of the Hindenburg disaster by radio on 6 May 1937 while in the air, returning from Brazil to Germany; they delayed telling the passengers until after landing on 8 May so as not to alarm them. The disaster, in which Lehmann and 35 others were killed, destroyed public faith in the safety of hydrogen-filled airships, making continued passenger operations impossible unless they could convert to non-flammable helium. Hindenburg had originally been planned to use helium, but almost all of the world's supply was controlled by the US, and its export had been tightly restricted by the Helium Act of 1925.

Graf Zeppelin was permanently withdrawn from service shortly after the disaster. On 18 June, its 590th and last flight took it to Frankfurt am Main, where it was deflated and exhibited to visitors in its hangar. President Roosevelt supported exporting enough helium for the Hindenburg-class LZ 130 Graf Zeppelin II to resume commercial transatlantic passenger service by 1939, but by early 1938, the opposition of Interior Secretary Harold Ickes, who was concerned that Germany was likely to use the airship in war, made that impossible. On 11 May 1938, Roosevelt's press secretary announced that the US would not sell helium to Germany. Eckener, who had unsuccessfully intervened, responded that it would be "the death sentence for commercial lighter-than-air craft." Graf Zeppelin II made 30 test, promotional, propaganda and military surveillance flights around Europe using hydrogen between September 1938 and August 1939; it never entered commercial passenger service. On 4 March 1940, Göring ordered Graf Zeppelin and Graf Zeppelin II to be scrapped, and their airframes to be melted down for the German military aircraft industry.

During its career, Graf Zeppelin had flown almost 1.7 million km (1,053,391 miles), the first aircraft to fly over a million miles. It made 144 oceanic crossings (143 across the Atlantic, and one of the Pacific), carried 13,110 passengers and 106,700 kg (235,300 lb) of mail and freight. It flew for 17,177 hours (717 days, or nearly two years), without injuring a passenger or crewman. It has been called "the world's most successful airship", but it was not a commercial success; it had been hoped that the Hindenburg-class airships that followed would have the capacity and speed to make money on the popular North Atlantic route. Graf Zeppelin's achievements showed that this was technically possible.

By the time the two Graf Zeppelins were recycled, they were the last rigid airships in the world, and heavier-than-air long-distance passenger transport, using aircraft like the Focke-Wulf Condor and the Boeing 307 Stratoliner, was already in its ascendancy. Aeroplanes were faster, less labour-intensive and safer; by 1958 they developed into passenger jets like the Boeing 707 which could cross the Atlantic reliably in a few hours. By 2017 annual air passenger journeys had surpassed 4 billion.

Modern airships like the Zeppelin NT use semi-rigid designs and are lifted by helium on their mainly sight-seeing duties.

== Specifications ==
Internal components and gas cell locations shown schematically, excluding passenger and engine gondolas

Data from

General characteristics

- Crew: 36
- Capacity: 20 passengers / Typical disposable load 19,900 kg (43,900 lb)
- Length: 236.6 m (776 ft 3 in)
- Diameter: 30.5 m (100 ft 1 in) maximum
- Fineness ratio: 7.25
- Height: 33.5 m (109 ft 11 in)
- Volume: 75,000 m^{3} (2,600,000 cu ft) hydrogen + 30,000 m^{3} (1,100,000 cu ft) Blau gas capacity
- Number of gas cells: 16
- Empty weight: 67,100 kg (147,930 lb)
- Fuel capacity: 8,000 kg (18,000 lb) petrol + 30,000 m^{3} (1,100,000 cu ft) Blau gas
- Useful lift: 87,000 kg (192,000 lb) typical gross lift
- Powerplant: 5 × Maybach VL II V-12 water-cooled reversible piston engines, 410 kW (550 hp) each
- Propellers: 2, later 4-bladed propellers

Performance

- Maximum speed: 128 km/h (80 mph, 69 kn)
- Range: 10,000 km (6,200 mi, 5,400 nmi) at 117 km/h (73 mph; 63 kn)

== See also ==
- List of Zeppelins
