= Grace Marguerite Hay Drummond-Hay =

British journalist (1894–1946)

Lady Hay Drummond-Hay
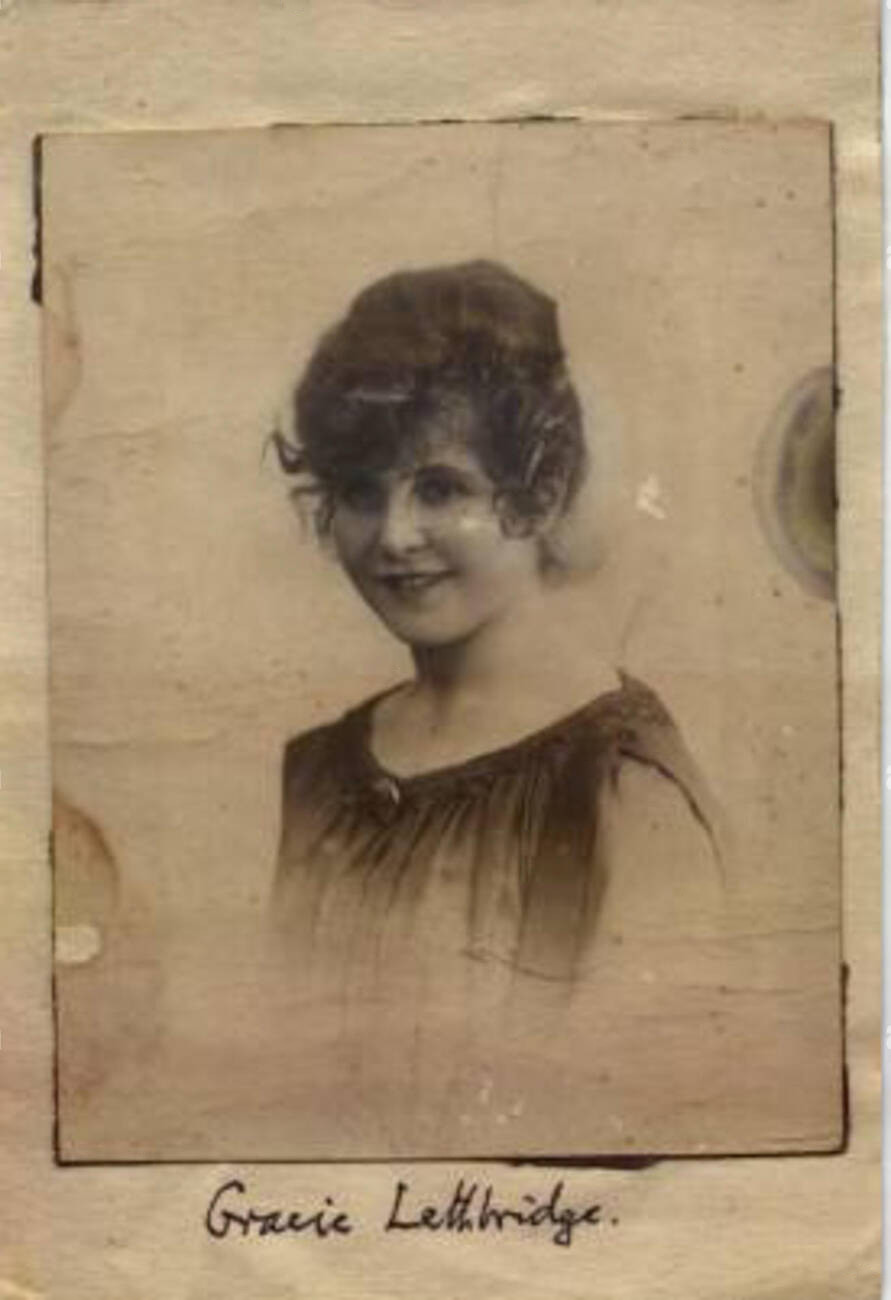
- Grace Marguerite Lethbridge
- Born: 12 September 1894; Liverpool, England, UK
- Died: 12 February 1946 (aged 51); Manhattan, New York, US
- Occupation: Journalist
- Spouse: Sir Robert Hay Drummond-Hay (1920–1925; his death)

Grace Marguerite, Lady Hay Drummond-Hay (née Lethbridge, 12 September 1894 – 12 February 1946) was a British journalist, who was the first woman to travel around the world by air (in a zeppelin). She contributed to the glamour of aviation and general knowledge of it by writing articles about her aerial adventures for US newspapers in the late 1920s and early 1930s, and qualified as an aeroplane pilot in 1930.

== Early life ==
Grace Marguerite Lethbridge was born on 12 September 1894, the eldest daughter of Grace Emily (née Willis) and Sidney Thomas Lethbridge. Her father was the managing director of the Spratt's dog and animal food company. Her paternal aunt was dancer Alice Lethbridge.

Grace Lethbridge was married in 1920 to Sir Robert Hay Drummond-Hay (1846–1925) at the age of 25, her husband being nearly fifty years older.

Sir Robert had been born in Tangiers, Morocco, and had been the British consul-general for years in Beirut, Lebanon. He was previously married to Euphemia Katherine, daughter of Thomas Willis Fleming. Four children were produced in this marriage, Arnold Robert, Edward William, Cecil, and Florence Caroline. The children were all significantly older than their new stepmother, Florence Caroline being 15 years older. After six years of marriage, Sir Robert died. Lady Drummond-Hay then was 31 years old. As a young aristocratic widow, she lived in her apartment in Finchley Road, London.

== Career ==
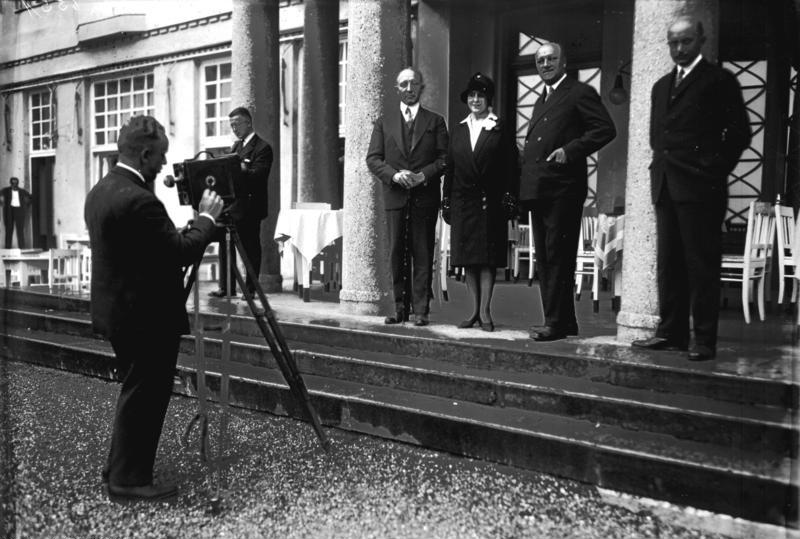
Journalists being photographed before a launch of the Graf Zeppelin, left to right: Karl von Wiegand, Lady Drummond-Hay, Rolf Brand, and Robert Hartmann

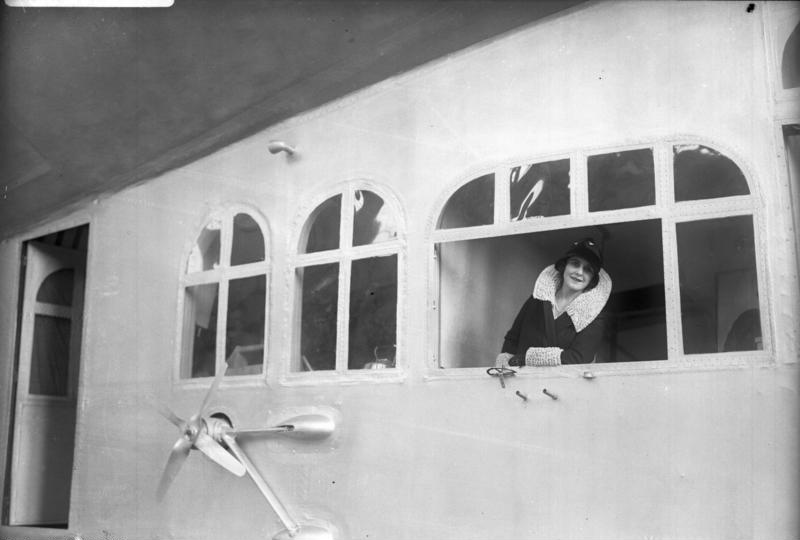
Lady Drummond-Hay on board the Graf Zeppelin

Having contributed to British papers such as The Sphere, Grace Drummond-Hay began to write for Hearst papers in the late 1920s. She wrote a series of articles for the Chicago Herald and Examiner, as one of the passengers aboard the first transatlantic flight of a civilian passenger zeppelin in 1928.

This airship, the LZ 127 Graf Zeppelin, was also the first to circumnavigate the world, in August 1929, taking off at Lakehurst, New Jersey and arriving there again 21 days later, after stops in Friedrichshafen, Germany, Tokyo, and Los Angeles. Captain Hugo Eckener commanded Graf Zeppelin on the flight. Drummond-Hay was the only female passenger. Among her 19 companion travellers were:

- Australian explorer Sir George Hubert Wilkins
- American multi-millionaire William B. Leeds
- Commander Charles Emery Rosendahl (USN)
- Hearst correspondent Karl von Wiegand
- Spanish physician Geronimo Megias, the personal doctor of Spanish King Alfonso XIII.

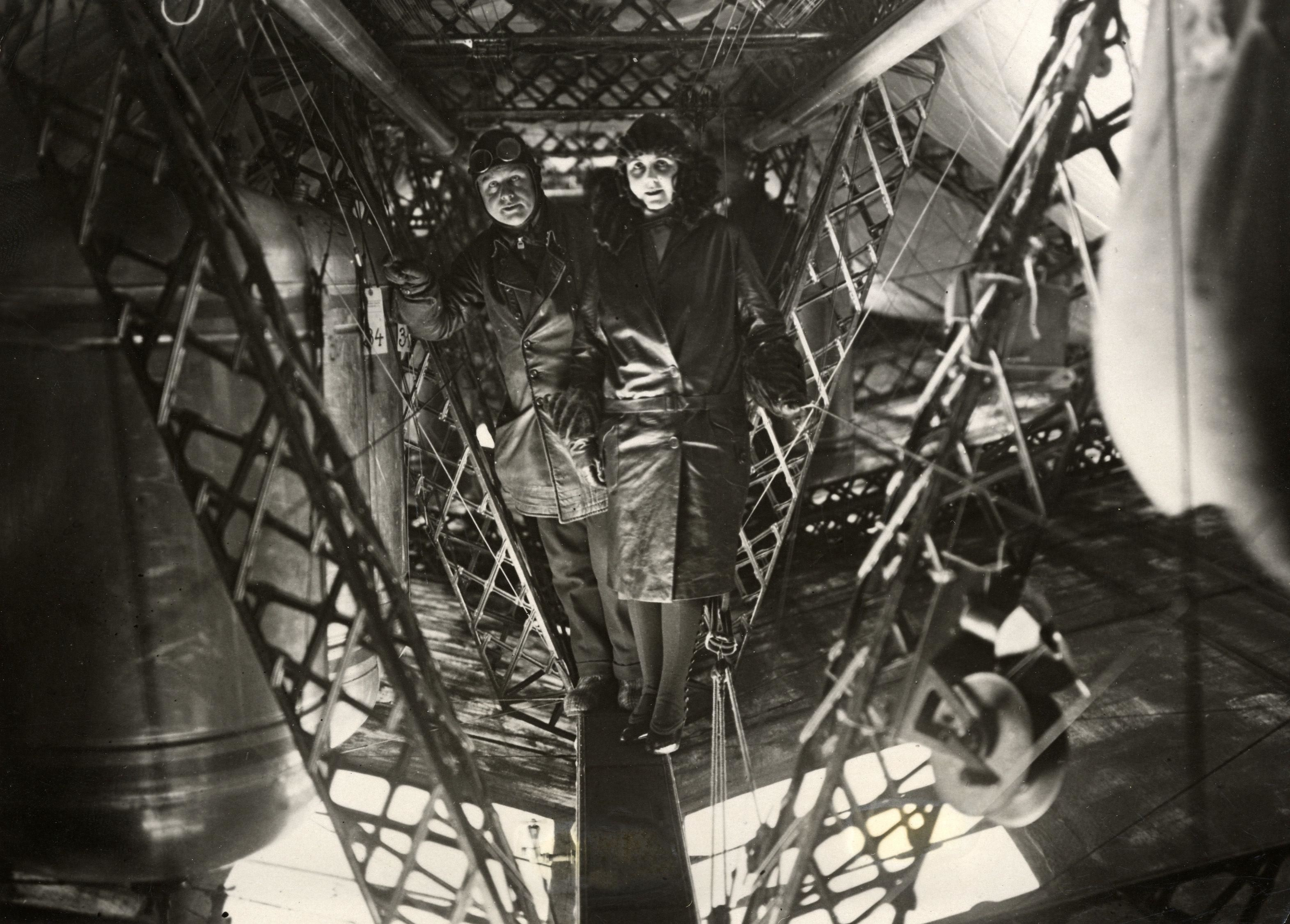
Lady Drummond-Hay standing in front of an unnamed man between the fuel tanks in the lower gangway of the Graf Zeppelin during the 1929 world tour.

Drummond-Hay gained fame after she arrived in New York, and her career as a journalist was secured for the next decade.

In 1930, Lady Mary Heath reported in her column in Popular Aviation magazine that Drummond Hay was learning to fly. She took lessons in New York and qualified for her British pilot's licence in 1930, initially flying a De Havilland Puss Moth.

In May 1933, Drummond-Hay had a cabinet plane made for her by the Waco Aircraft Company in Troy, Ohio and had it shipped back to Britain on the SS Bremen. It was landed at Southampton and taken to the nearby Hamble flying school to be made flight ready. The underside of the upper wings were painted in shades of blue and gold to create an Egyptian scarab wing pattern. She flew herself to investigative jobs abroad, and whilst piloting the plane she dictated press reports to her secretary to type on a portable typewriter.

In May 1936 Drummond-Hay was a passenger on the Hindenburg airship’s maiden flight from Germany to the United States and became friends with Clara Adams, who popularised air travel to the wider public.

Drummond-Hay went to war zones such as Abyssinia (Ethiopia) and was a foreign correspondent in Manchuria (China). She worked closely together for many years with her senior colleague Karl von Wiegand. Drummond-Hay was a well-known and respected journalist of the time, known for her beauty and wit, and the intelligence and flair of her writing. Ethiopian Emperor Haile Selassie presented her with a precious jewel, which was displayed on her body at her funeral.

== Last years ==
During World War II, Lady Drummond-Hay and von Wiegand were interned in a Japanese camp in the Philippines. When they were set free in 1943, she was ill and Karl suffered poor eyesight after a bomb blast. They returned to the United States on the Swedish rescue ship the SS Gripsholm in December 1943. Lady Drummond-Hay died of coronary thrombosis in the Lexington Hotel on 12 February 1946. At her funeral service, many people paid their last respects, including William Randolph Hearst and Marion Davies. After she was cremated, her ashes were brought to the United Kingdom by von Wiegand.

== Year of birth ==
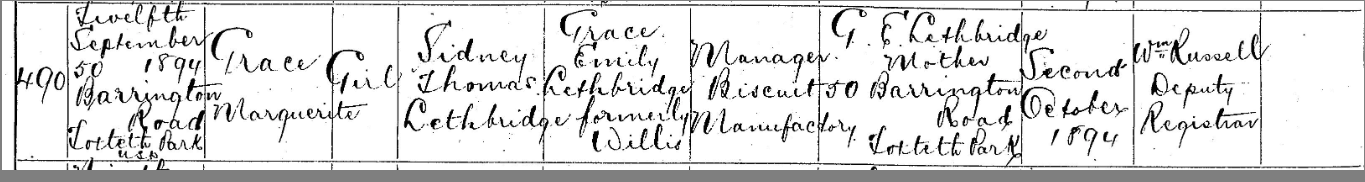
Extract from Grace Lethbridge's Birth Certificate

Although nearly all official documents state her year of birth as 1895, it was, in actuality, 1894. This is clearly shown on her birth certificate.

== Legacy ==
Though well known in the late 1920s and early 1930s, Lady Hay Drummond-Hay has been largely forgotten. Her name is mentioned in several books on the history of zeppelin flights, but no major biography or other significant document has been written about her life. She is one of the women featured in The Women Who Went Round the World, published in 2024.

An Australian documentary, The Airships: Ship Of Dreams (2004), included footage of her.

A gin based cocktail the Lady Grace Drummond-Hay was invented in her honour.

=== Semidocumentary Farewell ===
Lady Drummond-Hay's 1929 experience was explored in Vaarwel ("Farewell"), an episode of the Dutch documentary series Het Uur van de Wolf ("The Hour of the Wolf"), released in 2009. It was directed by Ditteke Mensink and researched by Gerard Nijssen, and told her story in semidocumentary form. The footage is of her and Graf Zeppelin's round-the-world flight. Extensive newsreel footage from the time showed in some detail how an airship operated. The narration consisted mainly of readings from Lady Drummond-Hay's articles and journal, and included discussion of her professional and romantic relationship with von Wiegand, whom she considered her soulmate.

Some parts of the film are fictitious; the airship did not have to land on water for repairs, nor did its tail fin did rip during the flight taken by Drummond-Hay, though it had done so during a previous transatlantic flight in October 1928.

Variety described the documentary as 'absorbing'. Vaarwel was later broadcast in the UK, on BBC Four, as Around The World by Zeppelin, on 7 February 2010. The English-language narration was by Poppy Elliott.
