= Glaam =

Village and municipal district in Germany

Coordinates: 50.8139°N 9.93917°E

Glaam is a village and a municipal district of Hohenroda in Hersfeld-Rotenburg district in eastern Hesse, Germany.

== Geography ==
The town is located in the Landecker Amt by the Rhön Mountains, directly on the border with Thuringia.

== History ==
The oldest known written mention of Glaam dates back to 1592.
