= Wilbur H. Durborough =

American war photographer and news reporter

Wilbur Henry Durborough
- Born: October 11, 1882; Rising Sun, Delaware, US
- Died: April 4, 1946 (aged 63); San Bernardino, California, US
- Occupation: photographer/cinematographer

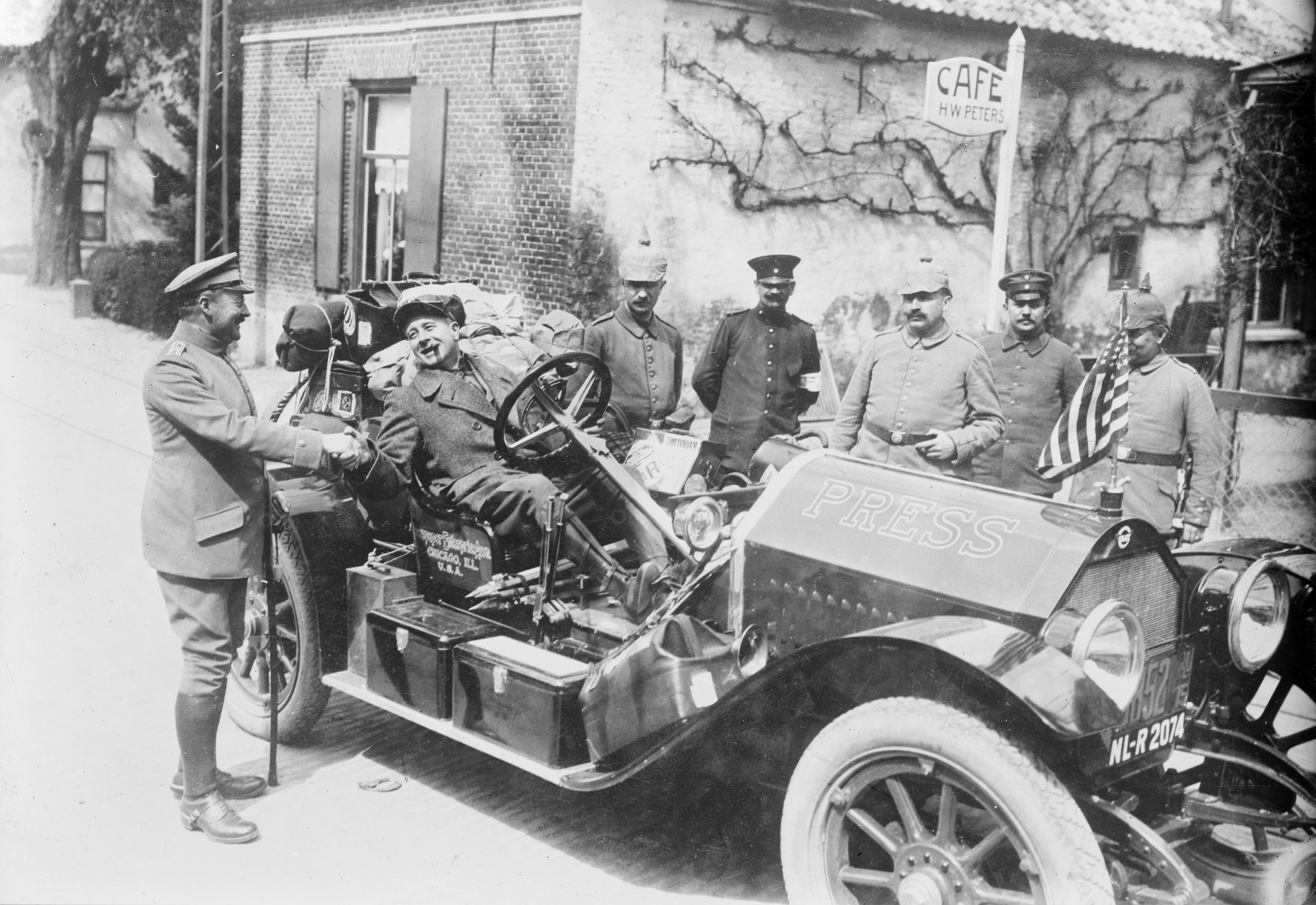
Durborough entering wartime Germany, April 1915

Wilbur Henry Durborough (October 11, 1882 – April 4, 1946) was a photojournalist and film correspondent who covered World War I with the German army.

== Biography ==
Photojournalist and film correspondent Wilbur Henry Durborough was born on October 11, 1882, in Rising Sun, Kent County, Delaware. After trying a number of different occupations, he decided to try photography, and was hired by the Philadelphia Inquirer in 1909. He then worked for Hearst's Chicago Examiner and in 1912 covered all three political conventions: the Republican Convention, the Democratic Convention, and the Bull Moose Convention. In 1913, he became a photographer for the Newspaper Enterprise Association, and it was there that he hit his stride. Shortly before the outbreak of World War I, Durborough reported on the Mexican War, covering the attack of Vera Cruz by U.S. Marines, together with Chicago Tribune cameraman Edwin F. Weigle.

Sometime in early 1915, Durborough proposed to a group of Chicago businessmen that he make a trip to Germany to cover the Great War. His plan was to do still photography, but also to make a film about the trip, showing the war to Americans first hand. He was not an experienced cinematographer, so he needed one to accompany him. Berlin approved his trip and together with his camera operator Irving Guy Ries he sailed for Europe. In wartime Berlin, Durborough and Ries filmed a notable Chicagoan, Jane Addams, along with Aletta Jacobs and Alice Hamilton, who were in Germany as part of the Women's Peace Movement. The three women had been traveling to all the capitols in Europe, trying in vain to persuade the responsible leaders in the various warring countries to make peace. This film scene has the only extant footage of Dutch suffragette Aletta Jacobs.

Durborough filming "On the Firing Line with the Germans" (1915)

In the summer of 1915, the American reporters went to East Prussia where they filmed the results of the Russian invasions of 1914. On their way to the Eastern Front, Durborough also filmed Field Marshal Paul von Hindenburg and Kaiser Wilhelm II. They accompanied the German army during the drive through Russian Poland and covered the fall of Warsaw and the forts of Novo Georgievsk.

After the war Durborough worked in public relations and he had his own photographic agency. He died in San Bernardino, California, on April 4, 1946, at the age of 63. Durborough was buried in Mountain View Cemetery. Shortly before his death, Durborough started writing his memoirs on his experiences as a war photographer. The original manuscript is now in the collection of the Library of Congress.

== Film work ==
On the Firing Line with the Germans has been restored by the Library of Congress in 2015, based on research by film historians James W. Castellan, Cooper C. Graham and Ron van Dopperen. It is the only contemporary American film documentary of World War I that has survived almost complete. The film is now in the public domain and can be watched online, almost exactly as it was first shown on the American screen in the fall of 1915. The digitally restored version of this World War I film premiered at the Pordenone Silent Film Festival in Italy in October 2015.

"On the Firing Line with the Germans" (USA, 1915)

Durborough's film adventures during the First World War have been described by James W. Castellan, Ron van Dopperen and Cooper C. Graham in their book American Cinematographers in the Great War. In 2017, the authors also published an extended film annotation on the making of On the Firing Line with the Germans.

On April 15, 2017, C-SPAN3 on American History TV first broadcast On the Firing Line with the Germans, with commentary by authors James W. Castellan and Cooper C. Graham.

In November 2017, authors Ron van Dopperen and Cooper C. Graham released an online reconstruction of Durborough's war film for the U.S. Signal Corps, The Western Spirit, that has a staged attack on Fort Lewis, Washington. The edit is based on Durborough's original script for this propaganda film. In 2018, the authors also discovered segments from original footage shot by Durborough on the shipping and war industry in the state of Washington.

The Western Spirit, (USA, 1918) - propaganda film by Wilbur Durborough for the U.S. Signal Corps. Reconstructed by Ron van Dopperen and Cooper C. Graham (2017)

== Sources ==
- Kevin Brownlow, The War, the West and the Wilderness (London/New York 1979)
- Graham, Cooper C. (2010). "The Kaiser and the Cameraman: W.H. Durborough on the Eastern Front, 1915]". Film History. 22 (1): 22–40. doi:10.2979/fil.2010.22.1.22. S2CID 191538288. Project MUSE 376112.
- Castellan, James W (April 2015). "Wilbur H. Durborough's Lost and Future 1915 World War I Documentary Film". Journal of Film Preservation (92): 45–52. ProQuest 1687075596.
- Castellan, James W.; van Dopperen, Ron; Graham, Cooper C. (2016). American Cinematographers in the Great War, 1914–1918. Indiana University Press. ISBN 978-0-86196-717-9. JSTOR j.ctt1bmzn8c.
- Book review "American Cinematographers in the Great War, 1914-1914" Historical Journal of Film, Radio & Television (2016)
- Ron van Dopperen, "Shooting the Great War from a Stutz Bearcat", World War One Illustrated, (Summer 2025), 37-39
- Weblog on the American Films and Cinematographers of World War I, 2013-2018
- James W. Castellan, Ron van Dopperen, Cooper C. Graham, "On the Firing Line with the Germans" Film Annotations: The Making of Wilbur H. Durborough's World War I Movie (2nd edition 2017)

== Films and pictures ==
- "On the Firing Line with the Germans" (USA, 1915) - restored by the Library of Congress in 2015
- Reel America: "On the Firing Line with the Germans", with commentary by Cooper C. Graham and James W. Castellan, broadcast by C SPAN3, 2017
- Wilbur H. Durborough - Collection of Film Frames and Pictures from "On the Firing Line with the Germans" (1915)
- "The Western Spirit" (USA, 1918) - propaganda film by Wilbur Durborough for the U.S. Signal Corps, reconstructed in 2017
- American Cameramen in World War I - video reconstruction with Signal Corps pictures (2026)
- Movie Trailer "American Cinematographers in the Great War, 1914-1918"
