= Wehrmachtbericht =

Propaganda report about the German military situation during World War II

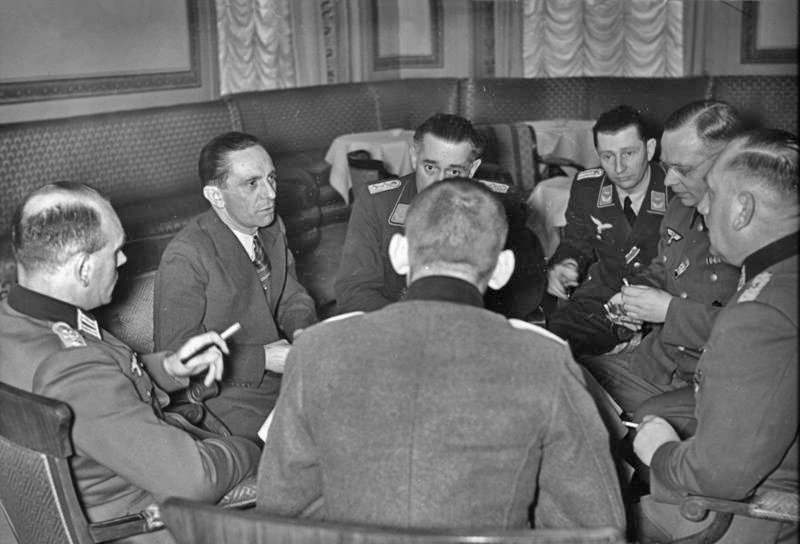
Joseph Goebbels with Wehrmacht propaganda officers, 1941

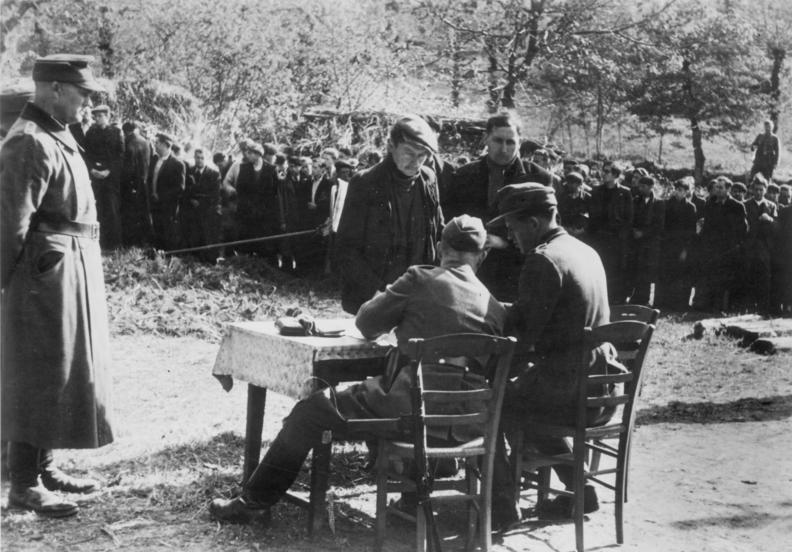
Image taken by Wehrmacht Propaganda Troops on 30 June 1944. Original caption reads: "Fight against terrorists in France. Communist terrorist groups are attempting to disrupt the German security measures. The Wehrmachtbericht reports daily on successes against the saboteurs. In the marketplace the first interrogations take place."

Wehrmachtbericht (German: [ˈveːɐ̯maxtbəˌʁɪçt], literally: "Armed forces report", usually translated as Wehrmacht communiqué or Wehrmacht report) was the daily Wehrmacht High Command mass-media communiqué and a key component of Nazi propaganda during World War II. Produced by the Propaganda Department of the OKW (Wehrmacht Propaganda Troops), it covered Germany's military situation and was broadcast daily on the Reich Broadcasting Corporation of Nazi Germany. All broadcasts were authorized by the Reich Ministry of Propaganda under Joseph Goebbels. Despite the latter's attempts to temper excessive optimism, they often exaggerated the success of the German armed forces, the Wehrmacht, leading historian Aristotle Kallis to describe their tone as "triumphalist".

Both civilian and military authorities considered the Wehrmachtbericht to be a vital instrument of German home-front mobilisation, the civilian contribution to the German war effort, especially after the defeat in the Battle of Stalingrad. According to historians Wolfram Wette and Daniel Uziel, the final 9 May 1945 communiqué laid the foundation for the myth of the clean Wehrmacht, the notion that the Wehrmacht had fought honourably and was not implicated in the crimes of the Nazi regime, for which (according to the myth) only the SS bore responsibility.

== Production ==
During World War II, the Wehrmacht communiqué (Wehrmachtbericht ) was the official news communication medium about the military situation of the Reich, and was intended for both domestic and foreign consumption. The communiqué was produced by a special propaganda department attached to the Wehrmacht Chief of Operation Staff, general Alfred Jodl, in the Wehrmacht High Command (the OKW). Commanded by general Hasso von Wedel, the department oversaw the growing number of propaganda companies of the Wehrmacht Propaganda Troops (Wehrmachtpropaganda), the propaganda wing of the Wehrmacht (in the army, the air force and the navy) and the Waffen-SS. At its peak in 1942, the propaganda troops included 15,000 men.

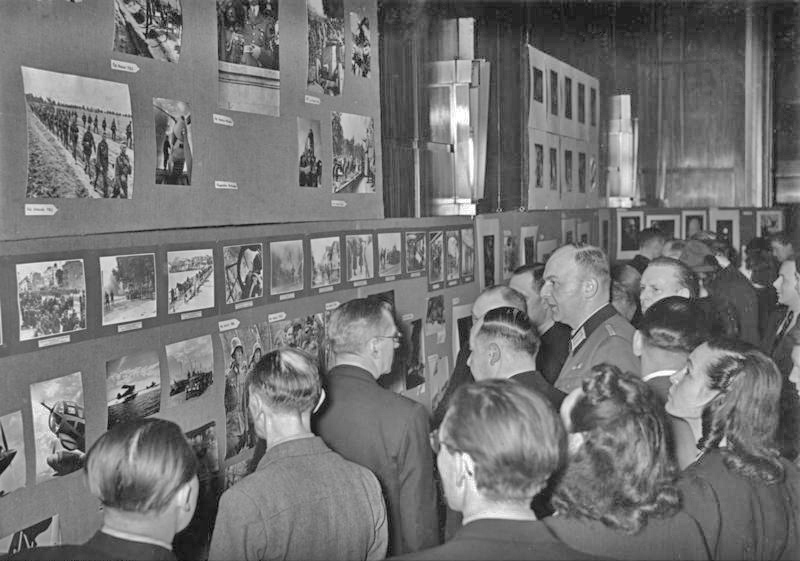
1940 exhibition of photographs produced by the propaganda companies during the invasion of Poland. The exhibit was organized by the Reich Association of German Press.

The planning for propaganda activities by the Wehrmacht began in 1938. Joseph Goebbels, the head of Ministry of Propaganda, sought to establish effective cooperation with the Wehrmacht to ensure a smooth flow of propaganda materials from the front. He deferred to the military in setting up and controlling the propaganda companies, but provided assistance in supplying personnel.

These troops, who were trained soldiers, were responsible for preparing the combat reports to be used as source material for the OKW communiqués. The propaganda companies were the only news-reporting units in areas of military operation, as civilian news correspondents were prohibited from entering combat zones. The troops produced the written, audio and film materials from the front and sent them to a processing center in Germany, where they were reviewed by censors, mostly for security purposes. The filtered materials were then forwarded to the Ministry of Propaganda for immediate dissemination.

All Wehrmachtbericht broadcasts were authorized by Goebbels's ministry as the controlling institution of the German media. A Ministry of Propaganda official attended daily Wehrmacht conferences, where the initial versions of the communiqué were provided to state and party officials. Goebbels's day at the ministry began with his adjutant reading out the text of the communiqués to him. While Goebbels did not have a final say in what went into the communiqués, he made sure that officials from his ministry worked closely with the Wehrmacht Propaganda Department.

The first communiqué aired with the start of World War II on 1 September 1939 and the last one was issued on 9 May 1945. The communiqués were broadcast daily on the Reich Broadcasting Corporation and published in the press. From 12 May 1940 onwards, Major Erich Murawski of the OKW Propaganda Department was given the task of adding commentary to them, both on the radio (21:00 to 21:15) and in the press. The commentaries were aimed at the civilian audience, and were written in layman's language so that the population could easily grasp the daily military developments. The communiqués were read twice, the first at a normal speed, and a second time more slowly, to enable them to be transcribed by listeners.

== Service record by campaign ==
=== Operation Barbarossa ===
In the summer of 1941, during Operation Barbarossa, the communiqués created an image of uninterrupted successful advances by Germany deep into the Soviet territory, with historian Aristotle Kallis describing the tone of the early Wehrmacht reports as "triumphalist". As the operation progressed, however, it was more and more difficult to sustain the illusion of a swift and decisive victory. The subsequent reports were at times in stark contrast with the deteriorating situation on the ground, which was noted by the German troops. After the Soviet Yelnya Offensive east of Smolensk in early September 1941, a German infantryman wrote:

Officially it was called a "planned withdrawal" (...). But to me it was so much bullshit. The next day, we heard on the radio, in the 'news from the front' (Wehrmachtbericht) about the "successful front correction" in our Yelnya defensive lines and the enormous losses we inflicted on the enemy. But no single word was heard about a retreat, about the hopelessness of the situation, about the mental and emotional numbness of the German soldiers. In short, it was again a "victory". But we on the front line were running back like rabbits in front of the fox. This metamorphosis of the truth from "all shit" to "it was a victory" baffled me, and those of my comrades who dared to think.

Starting in August 1941, when it became clear to some in the Propaganda Ministry and the Wehrmacht high command that the war would likely extend into 1942, Goebbels grew increasingly concerned about the triumphant tone of the communiques. However, a string of spectacular victories in September, especially in the Battle of Kiev, removed any restraint from the texts, making propagandists's work more difficult later on, when they had to explain the Wehrmacht's failures to the German public which was rapidly losing confidence in a swift victory.

Because of the competing goals, approaches and chains of command, along with the chaotic nature of the regime itself, the propaganda materials produced by Goebbels's ministry, the OKW and Hitler's press chief, Otto Dietrich, did not always agree in tone or assessment of the situation. After the assault on Moscow, Operation Typhoon, began on 2 October 1941, Goebbels described in his diary the "excessive optimism" that was developing in the population after the announcements about the initial rapid advance of the German forces. Concerned about an "almost illusionistic" mood, he instructed the press to adopt a more cautious approach and spoke to Jodl about tempering down the tone of the Wehrmacht communiqués. Nonetheless, the broadcast on 16 October announced that the first defensive line in front of Moscow had been broken, being still "too optimistic" for Goebbels.

=== The Battle of Stalingrad ===
The Wehrmachtbericht communiqués around the 1942 summer campaign and the defeat of the German army in the Battle of Stalingrad provide another case study on their effects on Germany's population and the evolution of the propaganda efforts themselves. In August 1942, the name "Stalingrad" was featured prominently in the communiqués even before the Wehrmacht reached the outskirts of the city. The communiqués were factual and restrained; nevertheless, Goebbels issued instructions to the German press to exercise "cautious optimism" so as not to set expectations too high among the population.

The Soviet counter-offensive, Operation Uranus, broke the thinly-held German flanks on 19 November; by 22 November, the encirclement of the 6th Army was complete. The concern of the propaganda organisations, both military and civilian, was how to present this military disaster to the public. Initially, every effort was made to hide the true scope of the events from the population. The communiqués published between 19 and 24 November merely mentioned the Soviet attack in the southern sector of the East front, not addressing the extent of Wehrmacht's difficulties.

From 24 November onward, the Wehrmacht communiqués began acknowledging the Soviet breakthrough and described "heavy fighting", but provided no references to the encirclement. The reports by the SD, the security and intelligence service of the SS, indicated that the 24 November report caused alarm among the population. There were periods where the OKW dispatches did not mention Stalingrad at all. Wild rumors describing 100,000 German troops trapped at Stalingrad were beginning to circulate, as some Germans were able to get the news from foreign radio.

On 16 January 1943, the dispatch finally mentioned that the 6th Army was fighting the enemy "on all sides", thus acknowledging the encirclement, but little was said about the situation in subsequent reports. Meanwhile, Goebbels was working behind the scenes to advance his program of mobilisation of the population for the "total war", using the impending defeat at Stalingrad as a rallying cry. Getting the go-ahead from Hitler, Goebbels launched the effort in the late winter of 1943. The state propaganda after that focused on the home-front mobilization, the civilian contribution to the German war effort, with this message continuing through the rest of the war.

== Impact ==
Despite occasional mis-alignment of messages, with the tone of the Wehrmacht communiqués being too exuberant for Goebbels, a self-described "realist", the relations between the military and civilian propaganda organizations proved successful throughout the war. Friction was low, even though several apologetic postwar publications, such as an account provided by Wedel, described the relations between them as problematic. Both Goebbels and Jodl considered the Wehrmachtbericht a vital instrument of the German home-front mobilization, especially after the defeat at Stalingrad.

From the onset, according to historian Daniel Uziel, the Nazi propaganda machine regarded the Wehrmacht communiqués as "possessing a future value, besides the immediate use as news delivery medium". Along with all the other propaganda materials produced by the Wehrmacht, the underlying message was the supposed "superiority of the German warrior's spirit and character". The final broadcast, issued by the Dönitz Government, aired on 9 May 1945 and read in part:

Since midnight the weapons on all the fronts are silent. By the order of the Grand Admiral Dönitz, the Wehrmacht ceased its hopeless fighting. With this, a nearly 6-year heroic struggle has ended. It brought us great victories but also heavy defeats. The Wehrmacht has been honorably defeated by superior forces. The German soldier, in accordance with his oath, has given his unforgettable effort to his people. Till the end the homeland supported him with all its strength, under the heaviest sacrifices. The singular performance of the front and Fatherland shall receive its final honor in the later, fair judgement. The achievements and sacrifices of German soldiers at sea, on the land and in the air has not escaped the notice of our enemy. Therefore, every soldier can hold his head high, and proudly lay his weapon down. He can start to work bravely and confidently the bitterest hour of our history, for the eternal life of our people.

Those words were intended for public consumption by the now-defeated nation. According to Uziel, in this final radio address, the Wehrmacht propagandists hoped to set the frame of reference for the entire war effort of 1939–45. In this they were successful; the last communiqué helped lay the foundation for the legend of the "clean Wehrmacht", the notion that Wehrmacht had fought honourably and professionally, and was not in any way implicated in the crimes of the Nazi regime, for which (according to the myth) the SS bore sole responsibility. This assessment is echoed by historian Wolfram Wette in his 2006 work The Wehrmacht: History, Myth, Reality.

== Named reference ==
According to the historian Felix Römer, the named reference in the Wehrmachtbericht (Namentliche Nennung im Wehrmachtsbericht), was an award, among other military decorations. As an award, the named reference in the Wehrmachtbericht was based on the Walther von Brauchitsch decree of 27 April 1940 which was published in the Heeres-Verordnungsblatt (Army Ordinance Gazette) on 6 May 1940.

== See also ==
- Nazi propaganda
- Signal, a magazine published by the Wehrmacht
- Themes in Nazi propaganda
- Waffen-SS in popular culture
