= Die Wehrmacht =

German magazine

Die Wehrmacht was a German military magazine, which was published from 1936 to 1944 to serve German Reich propaganda purposes.

It promoted the newly formed Wehrmacht, official editor was the new Oberkommando der Wehrmacht from February 1938 onwards.

Aimed at young readers, the price was only 25 Reichspfennig, and illustrated in colour, mainly by Theo Matejko. In September 1944 it was cancelled.

== Writers in magazine ==
- Herdin Hans Duden
- Richard Jügler
- Hasso von Wedel (general)
- Walter Jost
- Hermann Foertsch
- Friedrich Grimm
- Adalbert Forstreuter
- Werner von Blomberg
- Joachim von Stülpnagel
- Heinz Guderian
- Wilhelm Keitel
- Helmut Stellrecht
- Josef Magnus Wehner
- Paul Körner
- Wilhelm Reinhard (SS officer)
- Bruno Brehm
- Carl Krauch
- Edmund Glaise-Horstenau
- Theo von Zeska
- Friedrich Lützow
- Rolf Bathe
- Walter Scherff
- Otto Brües
- [[Heinrich Rodemer]]

== See also ==
- Der Adler - Luftwaffe equivalent
- Signal - Army equivalent
- Kriegsmarine - German Navy equivalent
