= LZ 127 Graf Zeppelin operational history =

German passenger airship (1928 to 1937)

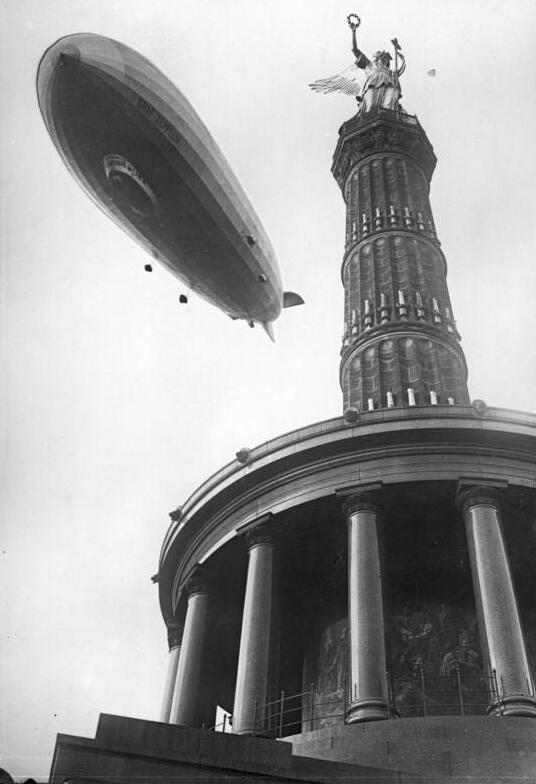
Graf Zeppelin over the Berlin Victory Column

LZ 127 Graf Zeppelin was a German passenger-carrying, hydrogen-filled rigid airship which flew from 1928 to 1937. It was designed and built to show that intercontinental airship travel was practicable. Its operational history included several long flights, such as a polar exploration mission, a round-the-world trip, trips to the Middle East and the Americas (operating five years of regular passenger and mail flights from Germany to Brazil), and latterly being used as a propaganda vehicle for the ruling Nazi Party. The airship was withdrawn from service following the Hindenburg disaster.

== Proving flights ==
During 1928 there were six proving flights. On the fourth one, Blau gas was used for the first time. Graf Zeppelin carried Oskar von Miller, head of the Deutsches Museum; Charles E. Rosendahl, commander of USS Los Angeles; and the British airshipmen Ralph Sleigh Booth and George Herbert Scott. It flew from Friedrichshafen to Ulm, via Cologne and across the Netherlands to Lowestoft in England, then home via Bremen, Hamburg, Berlin, Leipzig and Dresden, a total of 3,140 kilometres (1,950 mi; 1,700 nmi) in 34 hours and 30 minutes. On the fifth flight, Eckener caused a minor controversy by flying close to Huis Doorn in the Netherlands, which some interpreted as a gesture of support for the former Kaiser Wilhelm II who was living in exile there.

== First intercontinental flight (1928) ==
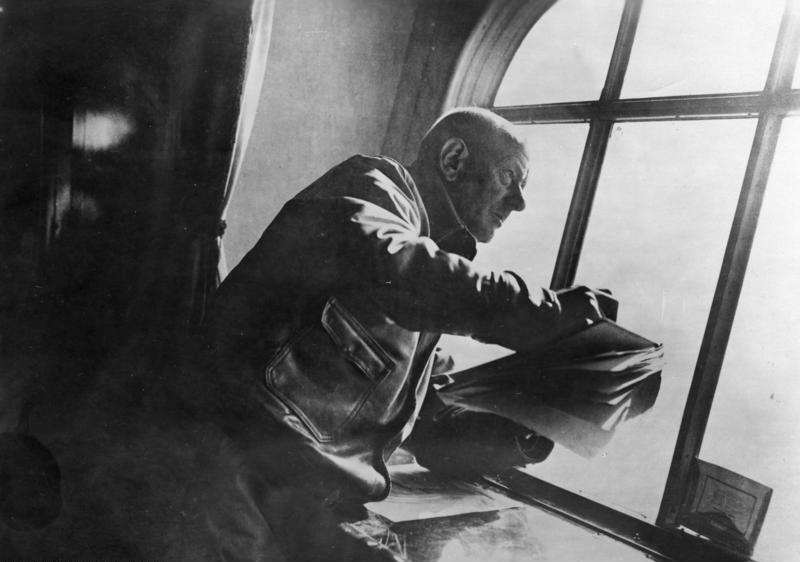
Ludwig Dettmann makes a sketch in the air.

In October 1928 Graf Zeppelin made its first intercontinental trip, to Lakehurst Naval Air Station, New Jersey, US, with Eckener in command and Lehmann as first officer. (Note: Lehmann commanded most of Graf Zeppelin's flights, 272 to Eckener's 133. Four other captains commanded a total of 100 flights.) Rosendahl and Drummond-Hay flew on the outward leg. Ludwig Dettmann and Theo Matejko made an artistic record of the flight.

On the third day of the flight a large section of the fabric covering the port tail fin was damaged while passing through a mid-ocean squall line 2,400 km (1,500 mi; 1,300 nmi) east of Bermuda (35°N, 42°W). With the engines throttled back, the riggers (including Eckener's son, Knut) made temporary repairs to the torn fabric while roped together for safety; whenever the airship descended too close to the ocean, they retreated into the ship so that engine speed could be increased to maintain lift. Eckener directed Rosendahl to make a distress call; when this was received, newspaper headlines speculated that the ship was lost, US Navy vessels prepared for a rescue mission, and the radio station WOR broadcast a prayer and minute of silence.

Graf Zeppelin was able to complete its journey after the repairs to the tail fin. When news broke that it was safe, it was deluged by radio calls of congratulation and requests to overfly particular places. It crossed the US coast at Cape Charles, Virginia, around 10 am on 15 October, then flew up the eastern seaboard via Washington, D.C., Baltimore, Philadelphia, and New York City, landing at Lakehurst at 5:38 pm. There was some annoyance from the Lakehurst personnel that the ship had not answered repeated calls for its position and estimated arrival time. Eckener explained that because the airship was forced to fly at reduced speed due to the damaged fin, the wind-driven generator which supplied electrical power to the zeppelin was unable to generate enough power to transmit a reply. The 9,926 km (6,168 mi; 5,360 nmi) crossing, the longest non-stop flight at the time, had taken 111 hours 44 minutes. Eckener was welcomed with a ticker-tape parade in New York and an invitation to the White House to meet Calvin Coolidge, the US president.

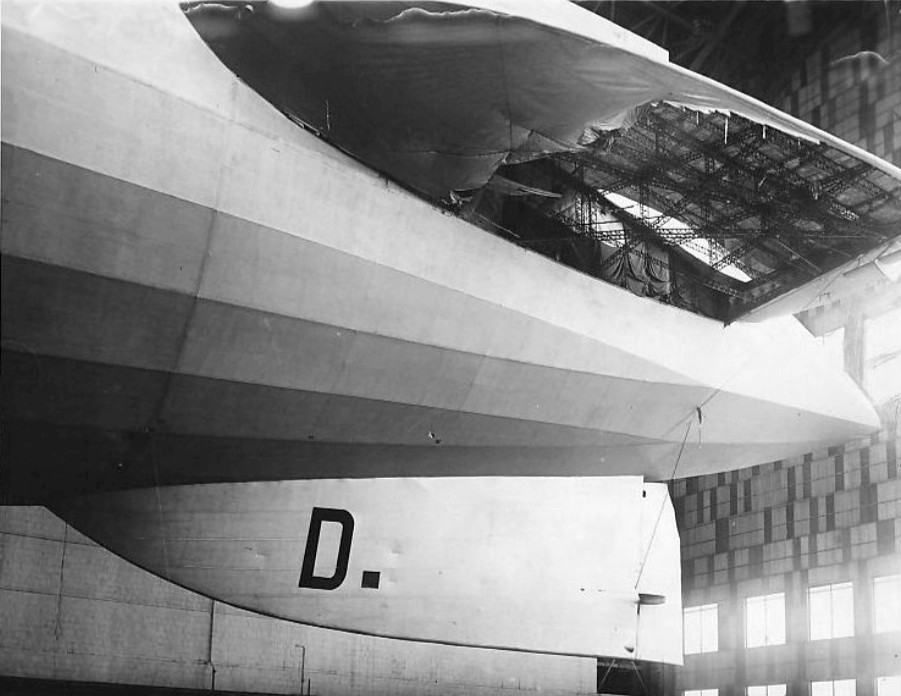
The damaged fin in the hangar at Lakehurst

After the tail had been repaired, Graf Zeppelin left Lakehurst at 1:24 am on 29 October. Clara Adams became the first female paying passenger to fly transatlantic on the return flight. The ship endured an overnight gale that blew it backward in the air and 320 km (200 mi; 170 nmi) off course, to the coast of Newfoundland. The wind caused the structure of the ship to bend visibly.

A stowaway, 19-year-old Clarence Terhune, sneaked aboard the zeppelin at Lakehurst and was discovered hiding in the mail room mid-voyage. On arrival in Germany he became well-known and received several job offers. (Note: Terhune was returned to the US on the liner SS Ile de France along with six airship passengers.) The airship returned home on 1 November. On 6 November it flew to Berlin Staaken, where it was met by the German president, Paul von Hindenburg, who praised the achievements of the ship, and those who had designed, built, and flown it.

== Mediterranean flights (1929) ==
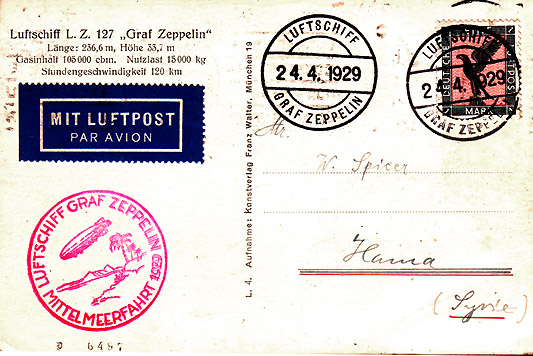
Postcard carried to Syria on the "Mittelmeerfahrt 1929"

With the cotton tail surfaces replaced by linen for added strength, Graf Zeppelin visited Palestine in late March 1929. It carried 28 passengers, some in the crew quarters. It had to leave port at 12:45 am because France only permitted it to overfly its territory in darkness, and above 3,600 feet. At Rome it sent greetings to Benito Mussolini and King Victor Emmanuel III. It entered Palestine at Haifa, flew over Jaffa, Tel Aviv and Jerusalem, and descended to near the surface of the Dead Sea, 156 meters below sea level. The ship delivered 16,000 letters in mail drops at Jaffa, Ramla, Athens, Budapest and Vienna.

The Egyptian government (under pressure from Britain) refused it permission to enter their airspace; the Egyptian journalist Mahmud Abu al-Fath, who was on board representing Al-Ahram newspaper, wrote that this was caused by British jealousy over the success of German technology. Eckener sent a telegram to King Fuad from just outside Egyptian territory, expressing regret that "contrary winds prevent us from flying over the land of the wonders of a thousand years." It then returned after a journey of 8,000 km (5,000 mi; 4,300 nmi) in 81 hours.

The second Mediterranean cruise flew over France, Spain, Portugal and Tangier, then returned home via Cannes and Lyon in a flight of 57 hours on 23–25 April.

== Forced landing in France (1929) ==
Shortly after dark on 16 May 1929, on the first night of its second trip to the US, Graf Zeppelin lost power in two of its engines off the southeast coast of Spain, forcing Eckener to abandon the voyage and turn back. Flying against a strong headwind up the Rhône valley in France the next afternoon, two of the remaining three engines also failed, and the airship was blown towards the sea. With Eckener struggling for a suitable place to force-land, the French Air Ministry allowed him to land at Cuers-Pierrefeu, near Toulon. Barely able to control the ship on its one live engine, Eckener made an emergency landing.

Graf Zeppelin was kept in the hangar which had housed the Dixmude (LZ 114) and the Méditerranée (LZ 121). (Note: The hangar had been removed from Düsseldorf as a war reparation.) The engines were replaced with working ones sent by rail from Friedrichshafen, and the ship returned there on 24 May. The incident, and the forced comradeship it engendered, softened France's attitude to Germany and its airships slightly. The incident was caused by adjustments that had been made by the chief engineer to the four engines that failed.

On 1 August 1929, the airship made a successful journey to Lakehurst, arriving on 4 August. Aboard both flights was Susie, an eastern gorilla who had been captured near Lake Kivu in the Belgian Congo and sold by her German owner to an American dealer. After a touring career in the US, Susie went to Cincinnati Zoo in 1931, where she died in 1947. (Note: Also aboard was the film-maker Merian Cooper, who was fascinated by the gorilla and the airship. One writer has speculated that Cooper may have been influenced to make the film King Kong as a result.)

== Round-the-world flight (1929) ==
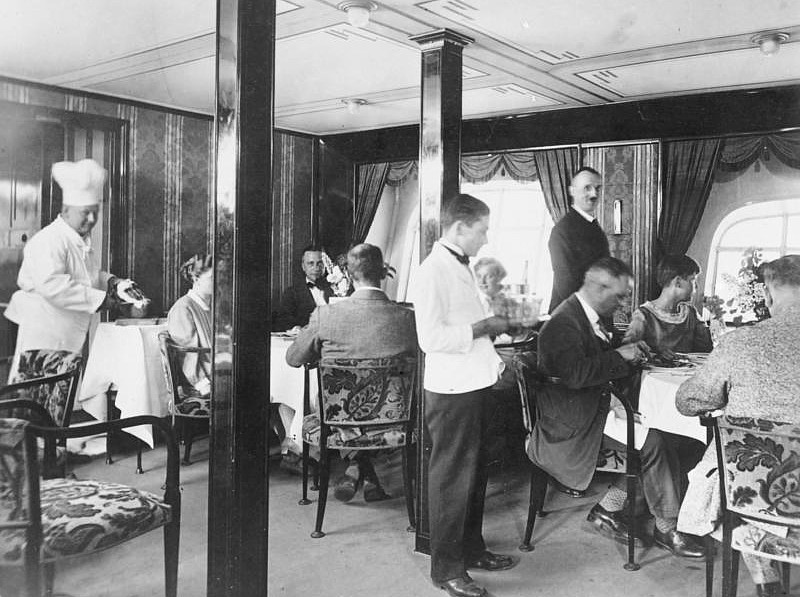
The dining room on board, August 1929

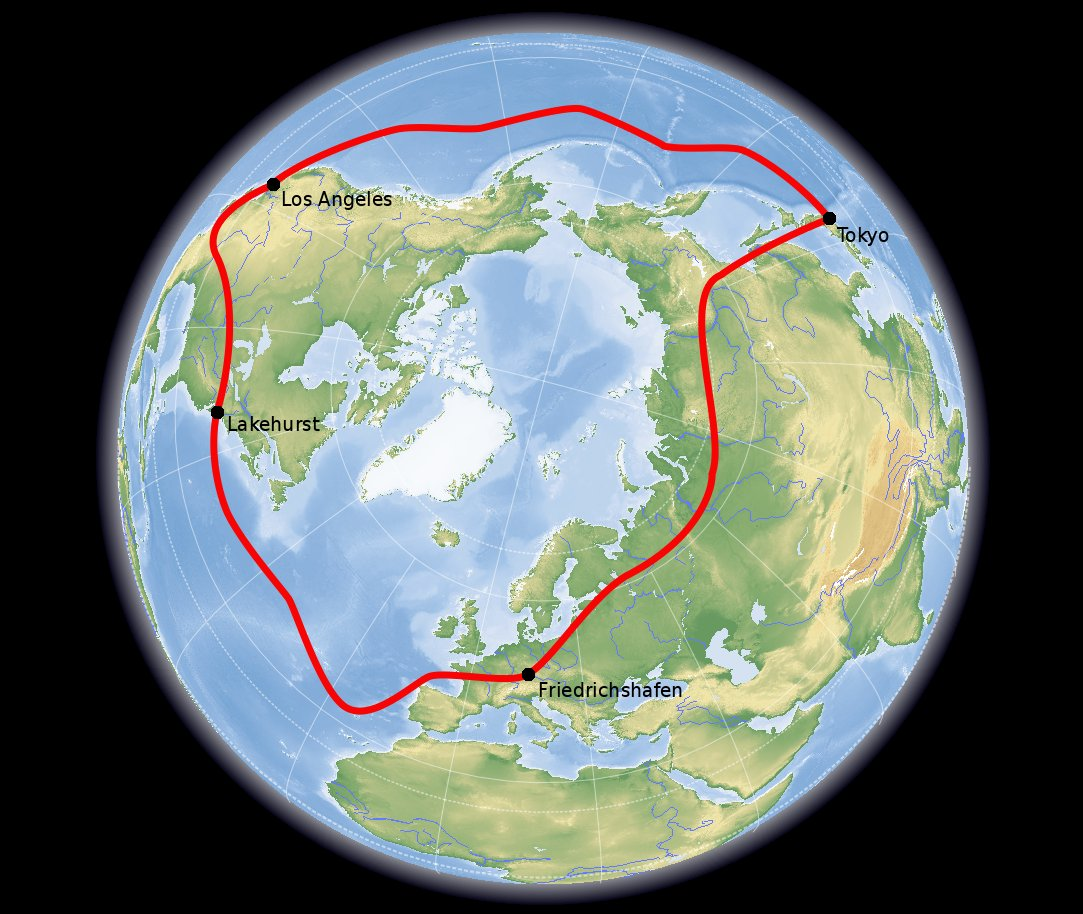
Route of the round-the-world flight Built in Friedrichshafen, Germany (47.654°N 9.479°E) Started at Lakehurst, US (40.033°N 74.3536°W) Eastward to Germany (47.654°N 9.479°E) Eastward to Kasumigaura Naval Air Base, Japan (36.05°N 140.217°E) Eastward to Los Angeles (33.9425°N 118.408°W), then back to Lakehurst (40.033°N 74.3536°W). Returned to Germany (47.654°N 9.479°E)

The American newspaper publisher William Randolph Hearst's media empire paid half the cost of the project to fly Graf Zeppelin around the world, with four staff on the flight; Drummond-Hay, Karl von Wiegand, the Australian explorer Hubert Wilkins, and the cameraman Robert Hartmann. Drummond-Hay became the first woman to circumnavigate the world by air. (Note: A semidocumentary film titled Farewell was released in 2009 which featured much of Hartmann's newsreel footage of her. The film was later aired on BBC under the title Around The World by Zeppelin.) Rosendahl and Lieutenant Jack C Richardson represented the US government; Japan's Commander Fuiyoshi and the Soviet Union's Comrade Karklin were also aboard.

Hearst stipulated that the flight in August 1929 officially start and finish at Lakehurst; the Germans considered that the trip began and ended at Friedrichshafen. Round-the-world tickets were sold for almost $3000 (equivalent to $55,000 in 2024), but most participants had their costs paid for them. The flight's expenses were offset by the carriage of souvenir mail between Lakehurst, Friedrichshafen, Tokyo, and Los Angeles. A US franked letter flown on the whole trip from Lakehurst to Lakehurst required $3.55 (equivalent to $65 in 2024) in postage. The $100,000 Hearst paid for exclusive media rights would be the equivalent of $1,800,000 in 2018.

Graf Zeppelin flew back across the Atlantic to refuel at Friedrichshafen, then continued across Eastern Europe and the Soviet Union to Tokyo. The Soviet government requested that it overfly Moscow, but Eckener declined for operational reasons, irritating the Soviets. While crossing Siberia it carried hunting rifles and other emergency supplies in case of a forced landing. The ship dropped a wreath near Yakutsk in memory of the dead German prisoners of war buried there. Crossing the inaccurately mapped Stanovoy Mountains in the Russian Far East, it had to climb to 6,000 feet to pass through a high mountain pass.

After five days in Tokyo, at a former German airship shed that had been removed from Jüterbog and rebuilt at Kasumigaura Naval Air Station, Graf Zeppelin continued across the Pacific to California. Eckener used the remnants of a typhoon to advantage, picking up a tailwind to boost ground speed. He delayed crossing the coast at San Francisco's Golden Gate so as to come in near sunset for aesthetic effect. The ship passed over Hearst's San Simeon residence during the night, and landed at Mines Field in Los Angeles, completing the first ever nonstop flight across the Pacific Ocean; 9,634 km (5,986 mi; 5,202 nmi) in 79 hours and 54 minutes.

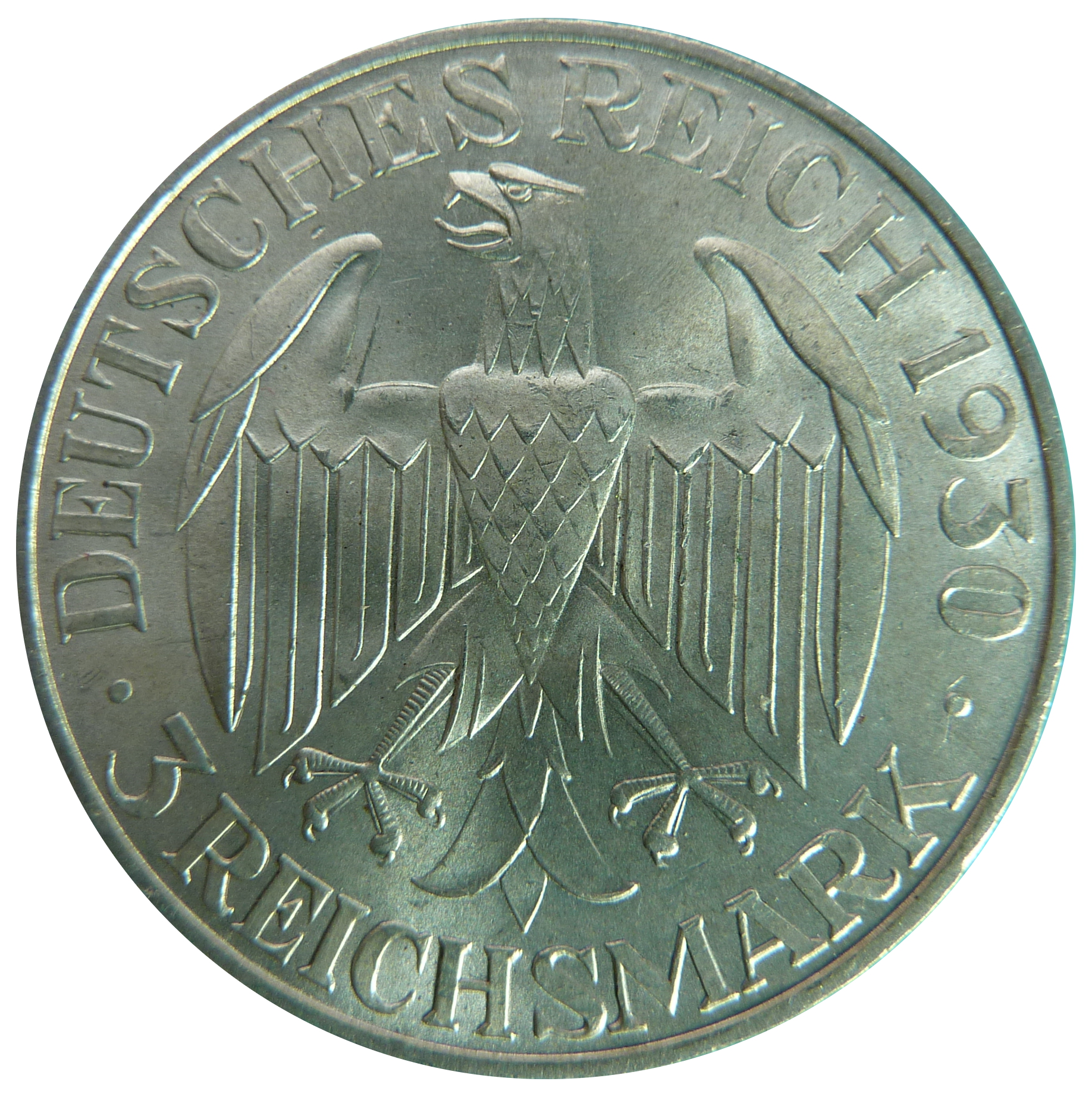
A 1929 German ℛℳ 3 coin issued to celebrate the round-the-world flight

The takeoff from Los Angeles was difficult because of high temperatures and an inversion layer. To lighten the ship, six crew were sent on to Lakehurst by aeroplane, and the minimum of fuel, food and spares were carried. The airship made a dynamic take-off with full power on four engines; it suffered minor damage from a tail strike and barely cleared electricity cables at the edge of the field. The 4,822 km (2,996 mi; 2,604 nmi), 51-hour-13-minute flight across the US took Graf Zeppelin over 13 states and El Paso, Kansas City, Chicago, Cleveland, and Detroit, before arriving back at Lakehurst from the west on the morning of 29 August, three weeks after it had departed to the east.

Flying time for the four Lakehurst to Lakehurst legs was 12 days, 12 hours, and 13 minutes; the entire circumnavigation (including stops) took 21 days, 5 hours, and 31 minutes to cover 33,234 km (20,651 mi; 17,945 nmi). It was the fastest circumnavigation of the globe at the time. Eckener remained in the US for discussions with the Goodyear Zeppelin company about plans for a future world airship network, leaving Lehmann in command for the last leg back to Germany. A passenger was caught smoking, which was very strictly forbidden on board; the culprit was held in contempt by the other passengers, but Lehmann had no means of punishing or confining him. At the end of the flight, on 4 September, the Graf Zeppelin was losing no more lifting gas than when it had departed.

Eckener became the tenth recipient and the third aviator to be awarded the Gold Medal of the National Geographic Society, which he received on 27 March 1930 at the Washington Auditorium. Before returning to Germany, Eckener also met President Herbert Hoover and successfully lobbied the US Postmaster General for a special three-stamp issue (C-13, 14 & 15) for mail to be carried on the Europe-Pan American flight due to leave Germany in mid-May. Germany issued a commemorative coin celebrating the circumnavigation.

== Europe-Pan American flight (1930) ==
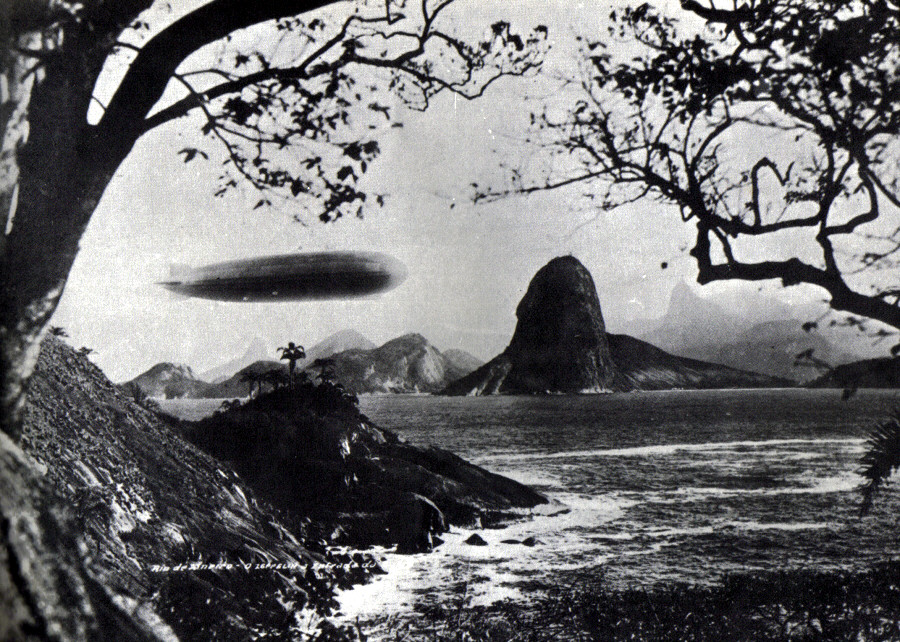
Graf Zeppelin over Guanabara Bay, in Rio de Janeiro, Brazil, 25 May 1930

On 26 April 1930 Graf Zeppelin made a brief visit to England commanded by Lehmann; it flew low over the FA Cup Final at Wembley Stadium, dipping in salute to King George V, then briefly moored alongside the larger R100 at Cardington, before returning to Germany with Eckener in command. On 18 May, it left on a triangular flight between Spain, Brazil, and the US, carrying 38 passengers, many of them in crew accommodation. At Seville the Infante Alfonso, cousin of the Spanish King, boarded on a goodwill visit to Cuba. At 9:30 am on 20 May, a ceremony on board celebrated becoming the first airship to cross the equator. Drinking and washing water ran low in the hot conditions. The ship arrived at Recife (Pernambuco) in Brazil, docking at Campo do Jiquiá on 22 May, where a temporary mooring mast and fuelling station had been set up, and 300 soldiers helped land it. It then flew to Rio de Janeiro, where it arrived ahead of time and spent some hours flying around the city. When it landed, there was no post to tether to, so it was held down by the landing party for the two hours of the visit.

It flew north, via Recife, to Lakehurst; adverse weather led to the planned stop at Cuba being cancelled, to the annoyance of passengers who had booked to go there. Alfonso, an experienced flier, was philosophical about it. The storm damaged the rear engine nacelle, which had to be repaired in the hangar at Lakehurst. During ground handling of the airship there, it suddenly lifted, causing serious injury to one of the US Marines who was assisting. From Lakehurst it flew over New York City, across the Atlantic on 2 June to Seville, where Alfonso disembarked, then back to Germany. A few hours from home, when the Graf Zeppelin flew through a heavy hailstorm over the Saône, the envelope was damaged and the ship lost lift. Eckener ordered full power and flew the ship out of trouble, but it came within 200 feet of hitting the ground.

The Europe-Pan American flight was largely funded by the sale of special stamps issued by Spain, Brazil, and the US for franking mail carried on the trip. The US issued stamps in three denominations: 65¢, $1.30, and $2.60, all on 19 April 1930. With the US in the depths of the Great Depression, only about 7% of the stamps had been distributed when the issue was withdrawn from sale on 30 June. Over three million unsold stamps were destroyed by the US Post Office, making the three Graf Zeppelin issues by far the USPOD's smallest of the 20th century. Despite the poor sales, the US Post Office Department paid Luftschiffbau Zeppelin $100,000 (equivalent to $1,882,000 in 2024) for the carriage of US franked mail on the flight.

Graf Zeppelin flew to Moscow and back on 9–10 September 1930 to make up for not going there the previous year. It landed briefly at Moscow's October Field to collect souvenir mail.

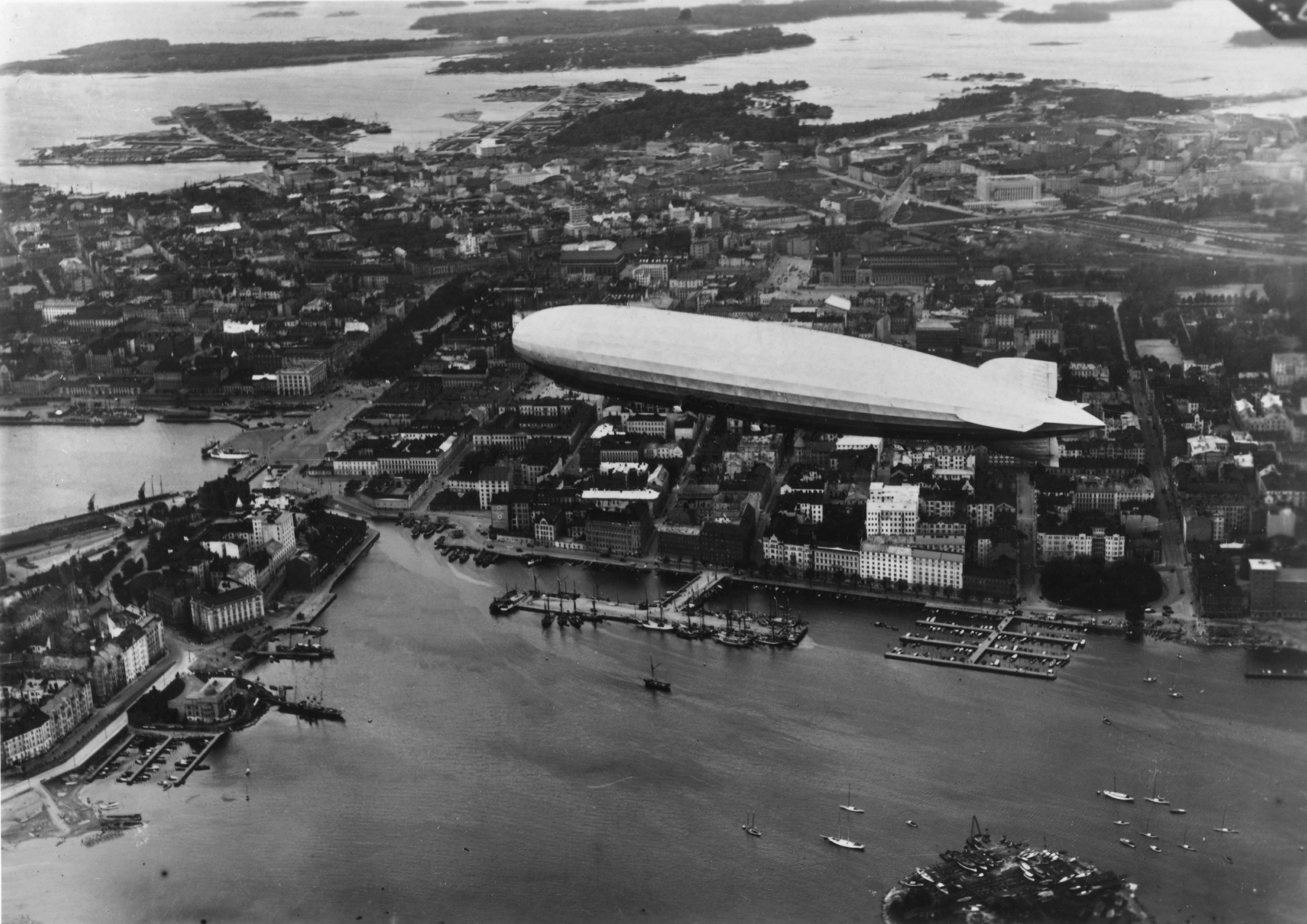
Graf Zeppelin above Helsinki, 24 September 1930 during its Baltic Sea excursion.

In late September Graf Zeppelin toured the capitals around the Baltic Sea. The flight was planned to visit Riga, Tallinn, Helsinki and Stockholm and to drop mail during its visits. Three of its 15 passengers were meant to get off in Helsinki, but the planned landing had to be cancelled due to strong winds. The ship dropped flowers and chocolate to the wife of the German consul in Töölö district.

In October Eckener and Hans von Schiller attended the funeral service in London for the 48 people killed in the R101 disaster. (Note: Britain withdrew from building rigid airships, cancelled the Imperial Airship Scheme, and scrapped the R100 within a year of the crash.)

== Middle East flight (1931) ==
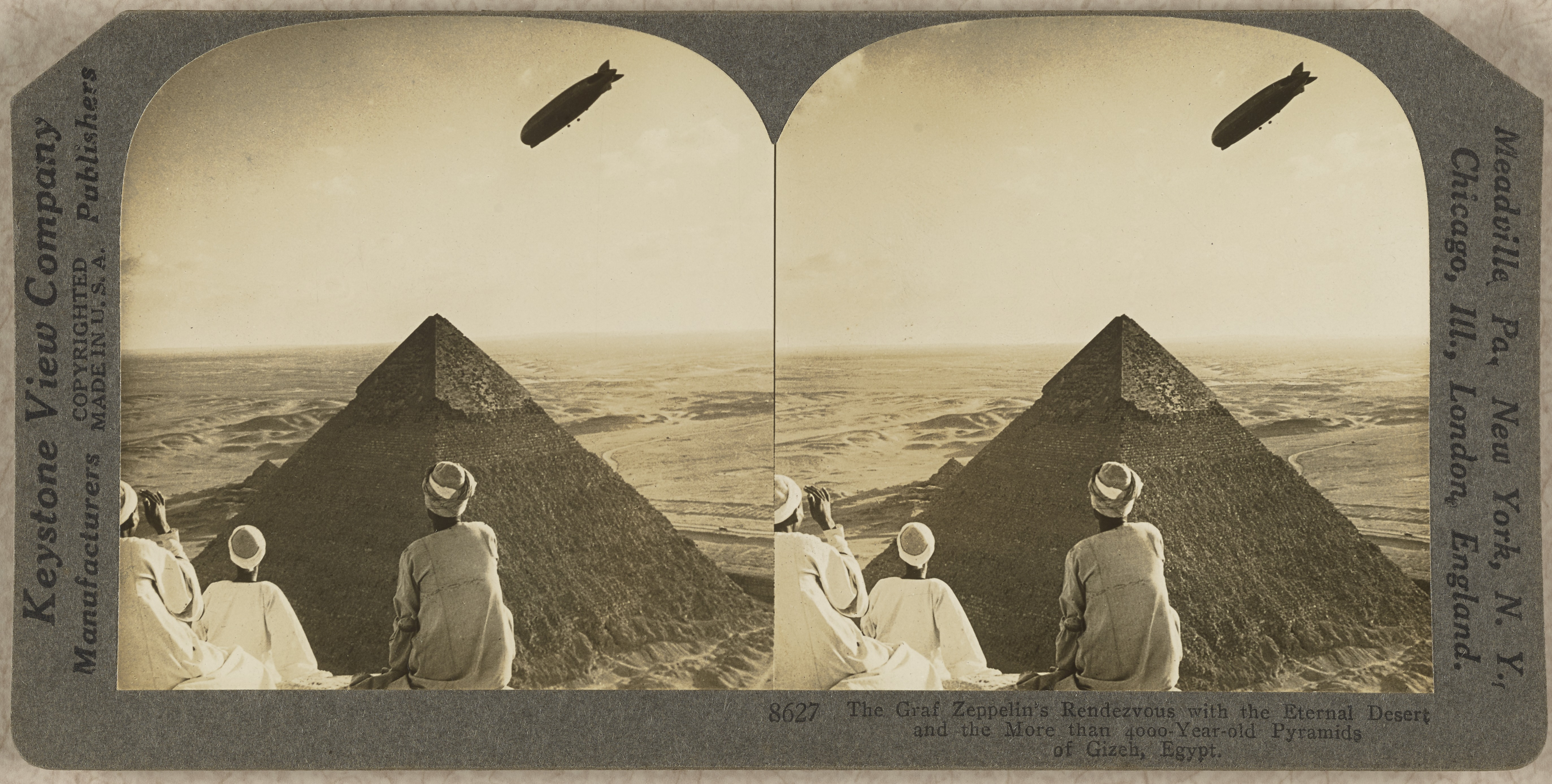
Stereograph of Graf Zeppelin flying over the Great Pyramid of Giza on 10 April 1931

The second flight to the Middle East took place in 1931, beginning on 9 April. It carried Booth, now commander of the grounded, but not yet scrapped, R100. Al-Fath again covered the event for Al-Ahram. Graf Zeppelin was allowed to overfly France in daylight this time, and crossed the Mediterranean to Benghazi in Libya. It flew via Alexandria, to Cairo in Egypt, where it saluted King Fuad at the Qubbah Palace, then visited the Great Pyramid of Giza and hovered 70 feet above the top of the monument. While in Cairo, Eckener met Flight Lieutenant H F Luck, from the British airship station at Ismailia, who had been sent there to receive the R101 on its maiden voyage to India, before its accidental destruction the previous October. After a brief stop, the ship flew to Palestine where it circled Jerusalem, then returned to Cairo to pick up Eckener, who had stayed for an audience with the King. It returned to Friedrichshafen on 13 April.

== Polar flight (1931) ==
Graf Zeppelin lands on the Arctic Ocean, as seen from a boat from the Soviet icebreaker Malygin

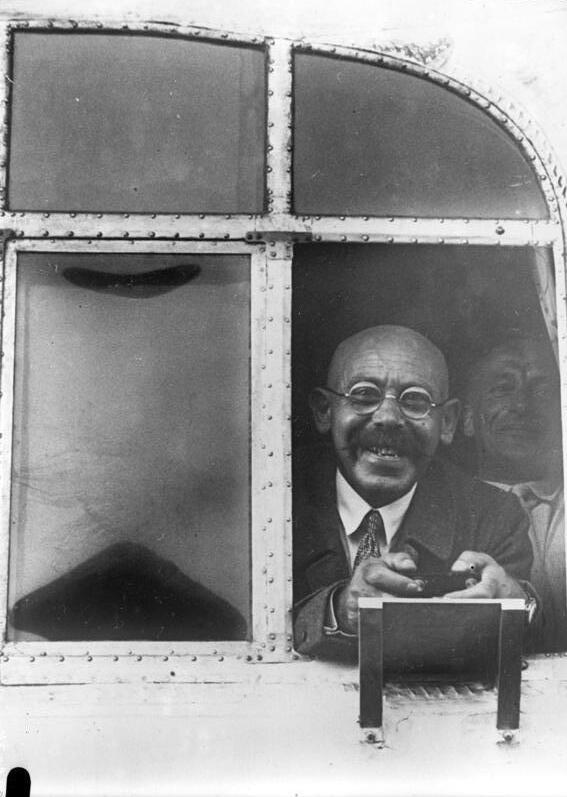
Professor Samoilowich looking out from one of the windows of the airship

The idea of using airships to explore the Arctic had been a dream of Count Zeppelin 20 years earlier, but was put on hold during World War I. Roald Amundsen had taken a Dornier Wal flying boat to the Arctic in July 1925, and commented that an airship would have been a better vehicle for the journey. Arctic exploration was one reason used to justify the restoration of Germany's right to build airships. Eckener had taken Graf Zeppelin on a three-day trip to Norway and Spitsbergen in July 1930 to test its performance in the region. This was followed by a three-day flight to Iceland. Both trips were completed without technical problems.

The International Society for the Exploration of the Arctic by Air (Aeroarctic) was interested in getting Eckener involved in a polar flight. Fridtjof Nansen, the president of Aeroarctic, died suddenly, and Eckener was offered the presidency. Overwhelmed by the offer, he consulted the German Chancellor, Heinrich Brüning, who was unable to help him. Wilkins then suggested a polar rendezvous. The initial plan was to meet the Nautilus (SS-73), the submarine in which Wilkins was attempting a trip under the polar ice. The submarine suffered technical problems and was later scuttled off Bergen, Norway. (Note: The scuttling was mandated by the London Naval Treaty.)

The polar flight (Polarfahrt 1931) lasted from 24 to 31 July 1931. Graf Zeppelin carried emergency equipment including tents, inflatable boats, fishing equipment, petrol stoves, and 4,100 kg (9,000 lb) of food. To save weight, luxury fittings were removed and the beds were replaced by lightweight bunks. The ship rendezvoused with the Soviet icebreaker Malygin, which had the Italian polar explorer Umberto Nobile aboard. (Note: Nobile had survived the fatal crash of the Italia in the Arctic three years previously.) It exchanged 120 kg (260 lb) of souvenir mail with the airship, which Eckener landed on the Arctic Ocean, using canvas buckets of sea water to descend to the surface, flotation aids, and a sea anchor to hold position. Fifty thousand cards and letters, weighing 300 kg (660 lb), were flown. The costs of the expedition were met largely by the sale of special postage stamps issued by Germany and the Soviet Union to frank the mail carried on the flight.

The writer Arthur Koestler was one of two journalists on board, along with a multinational team of scientists led by the Russian Professor Samoilowich, who measured the Earth's magnetic field, and a Russian radio operator, Ernst Krenkel. The expedition photographed and mapped Franz Josef Land accurately for the first time, and came within 910 kilometres (570 mi; 490 nmi) of the North Pole. It deployed three early radiosondes over the Arctic to collect meteorological data from the upper atmosphere; they were released through a specially built large hatch in the keel, with a weight that dropped away, allowing them to climb.

== South American operations (1931–1937) ==
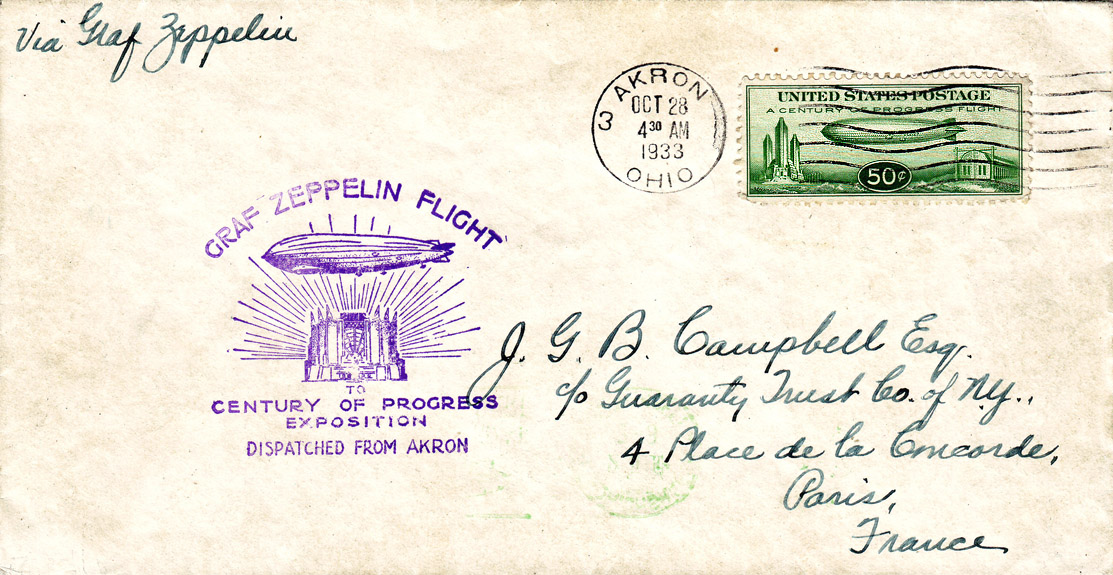
Century of Progress cover franked with C-18

From the beginning Luftschiffbau Zeppelin had plans to serve South America; there was an early failed plan to charter the ship to a Spanish company to carry mail from Seville to Buenos Aires in Argentina. (Note: It was intended in 1928 to offer passage between Friedrichshafen and Rio de Janeiro for ℛℳ 1,500 ($356, equivalent to $7,000 in 2024).) There was a large community of Germans in Brazil, and existing sea connections were slow and uncomfortable. Graf Zeppelin could transport passengers over long distances in the same luxury as an ocean liner, and almost as quickly as contemporary airliners.

After its single trip to Brazil in 1930, Graf Zeppelin made three in 1931. On 7 September it completed its eighth transatlantic flight, to Recife and back, in under nine days; it had left home on 29 August. In December 1931 it was laid up for a complete overhaul in preparation for regular transatlantic service. All nine round trips during 1932 were made on schedule. The final one returned to Germany on 3 November.

The route to Brazil meant flying down the Rhône valley in France, a cause of great sensitivity between the wars. (Note: In 1929 the Schneider-Creusot company complained that Graf Zeppelin had flown low over their weapons factory.) The French government, concerned about espionage, restricted it to a 12 nmi (22 km; 14 mi)-wide corridor in 1934. Turning right at the Mediterranean, it followed the coast of Spain to Gibraltar, then the coast of North Africa as far as Río de Oro, turning right again over the ocean to the Cape Verde islands, then Fernando de Noronha and direct to Recife where it could be replenished with fuel and lifting gas. The service initially terminated there, and was later extended to Rio de Janeiro to meet demand.

Graf Zeppelin was too small and slow for the stormy North Atlantic route, but because of the Blau gas fuel, could carry out the longer South Atlantic service. The Great Depression led to a reduction in its flights from almost 200 in 1930–31 to fewer than 60 in 1932. On 2 July 1932 it left for another visit to Britain; it arrived with a Junkers G.38, moored at Hanworth Air Park assisted by Rover Scouts, then flew a 24-hour tour of Britain, flying over Portsmouth, Edinburgh, Glasgow, Liverpool, Cardiff and Bristol.

While returning from Brazil in October 1933, Graf Zeppelin stopped at Miami (NAS Opa Locka) and then in Akron, Ohio, where it moored at the Goodyear Zeppelin airdock, the only time the airdock's international facilities were used. The airship then appeared at the Century of Progress World's Fair in Chicago. It displayed swastika markings on the left side of the fins, as the Nazi Party had taken power in January. Eckener, aware that the Nazis were unpopular in America, circled the fair clockwise so that the swastikas would not be seen by the spectators. The ship returned to Akron for two days, visited Canada, overflew the White House, then left for home with an overnight stop in Seville. The United States Post Office Department issued a special 50-cent airmail stamp (C-18) for the visit, which was the fifth and final one the ship made to the US. It made twelve return trips to South America in 1934; on the third one it flew to Buenos Aires to gauge interest in starting an airship service there. This did not materialise, and connecting services were provided by aeroplane from Rio de Janeiro.

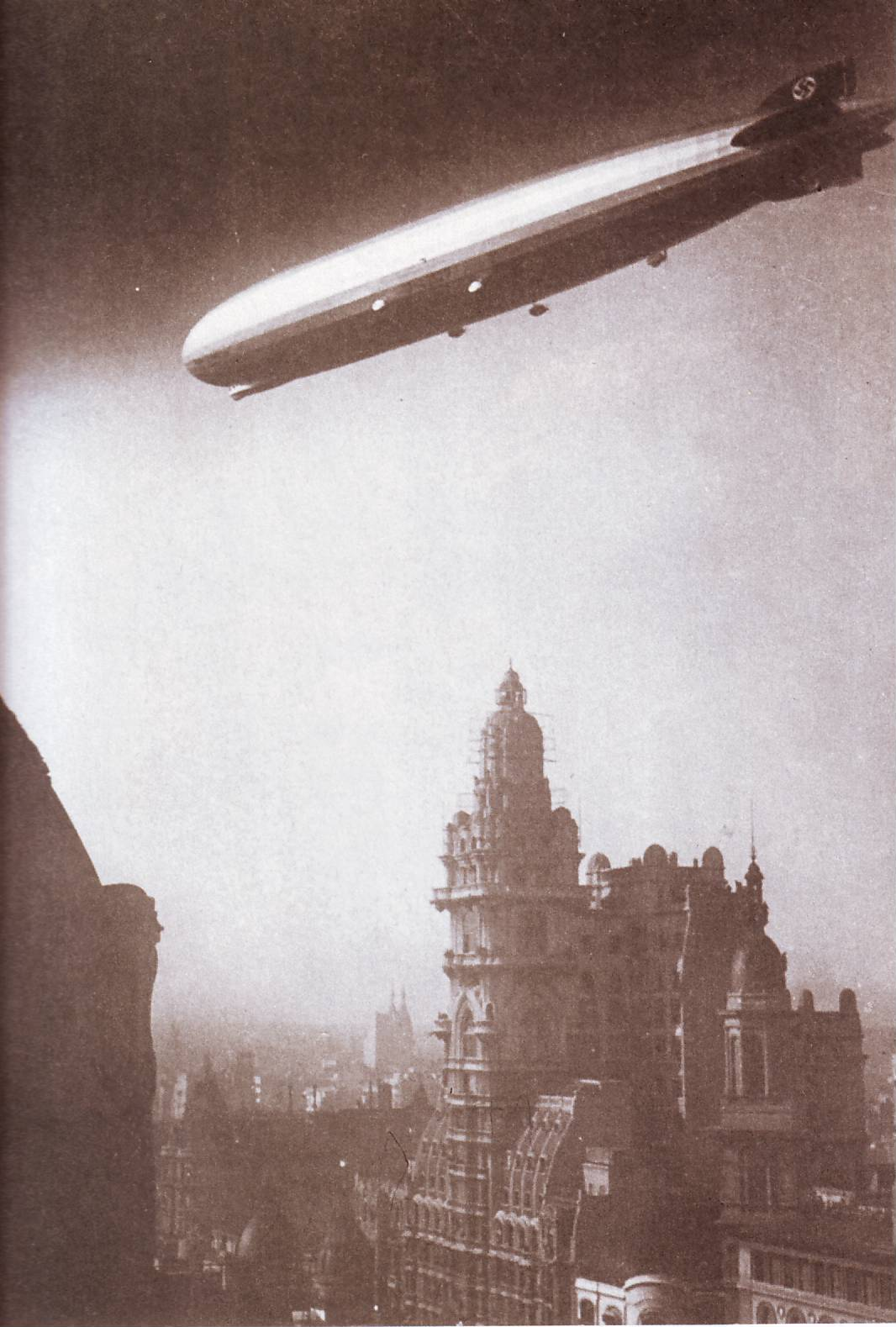
Graf Zeppelin over Buenos Aires in 1934

In spite of the dope, the cotton envelope absorbed moisture from the air in humid tropical conditions. When the relative humidity reached 90%, the ship's weight rose by almost 1,800 kilograms (4,000 lb). Exposure to tropical downpours could greatly add to this, but when under way the ship had enough reserve power to generate dynamic lift to compensate. On 25 April 1935 it made a rough forced landing at Recife after it was caught in a rainstorm at low speed on the approach to land and the added weight of several tons of water caused it to sink to the ground. The lower rudder was lost, the outer envelope was ripped in several places, and a petrol tank was punctured by a palm tree. A crewman extinguished a cooking fire close to the landing site. The damage was repaired on return to Friedrichshafen.

In late 1935 the existing postal shuttle service between Recife and Bathurst, in the British African colony of the Gambia, had to be suspended so that the ships supporting the Dornier Wal flying boats which operated it could be serviced. Graf Zeppelin was put into service as a replacement, carrying mail only. There was no landing facility at Bathurst, so mailbags were exchanged by rope. The first of three return journeys left Recife on 15 November. On 24 November, during the second trip, the crew learned of an insurrection in Brazil, and there was some doubt whether it would be possible to return to Recife. Graf Zeppelin delivered its mail to Maceió, then loitered off the coast for three days until it was safe to land, after a flight of 118 hours and 40 minutes. It returned to Germany on 10 December, having made 19 South American trips in a year.

In May 1936 the new airship base at Frankfurt am Main opened, and Graf Zeppelin started operating from it; higher payloads could be carried as it was nearer sea level than Friedrichshafen. (Note: Initially there was only one hangar at the new base; Hindenburg was based there and Graf Zeppelin was ferried there from Friedrichshafen for each flight.) Brazil also built a hangar for airships at Bartolomeu de Gusmão Airport, near Rio de Janeiro, at a cost of $1 million (equivalent to $23 million in 2018). (Note: To help persuade Getúlio Vargas, the Brazilian president, to build the facility, Eckener had flown Graf Zeppelin over his yacht, the Almirante Jazequay, and lowered him a package containing two bottles of Rhine wine and a note.) Brazil charged the DZR $2000 ($45,000) per landing, and had agreed that German airships would land there 20 times per year, to pay off the cost. The hangar was constructed in Germany and the parts were transported and assembled on site. It was finished in late 1936, and was used four times by Graf Zeppelin and five by Hindenburg. It now houses units of the Brazilian Air Force.

Graf Zeppelin made 64 round trips to Brazil, on the first regular intercontinental commercial air passenger service, and it continued until the loss of the Hindenburg in May 1937.

== Propaganda (1936) ==
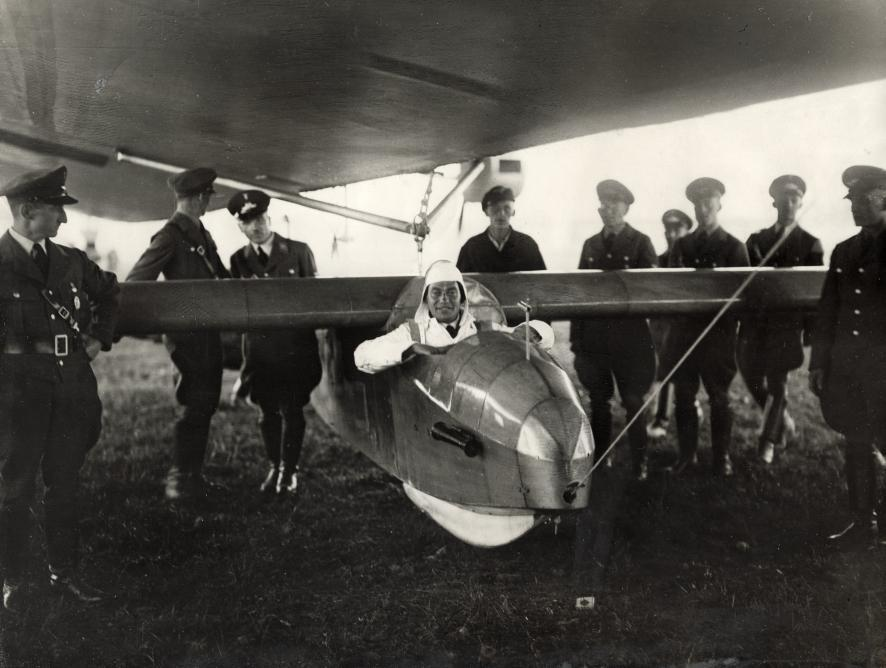
Preparing to release a glider over Berlin

In 1932 Eckener had declined permission for Graf Zeppelin to endorse Hindenburg's electoral campaign against Adolf Hitler; he later made a speech on radio supporting the moderate policies of Brüning. He was outspoken about his dislike of the Nazi Party and was warned by Rudolf Diels, the head of the Gestapo, but faced no other sanction. When the Nazis gained power in 1933, Joseph Goebbels (Reich Minister of Propaganda) and Hermann Göring (Commander-in-chief of the Luftwaffe) put millions of marks into Luftschiffbau Zeppelin, on condition it was reorganised. Luftschiffbau Zeppelin would continue to build airships, but a new airline would operate them, Deutsche Zeppelin Reederei (DZR). The Nazis sidelined Eckener by putting the more sympathetic Lehmann in charge of DZR, and used Graf Zeppelin as a propaganda tool. On 14 May 1934 over Berlin, it released a glider from under its hull.

On 7 March 1936, in violation of the Treaty of Versailles and the Locarno Treaties, German troops reoccupied the Rhineland, Germany's western border region which was designated as a demilitarised buffer zone. Hitler called a plebiscite for 29 March to retrospectively approve the reoccupation, and adopt a list of exclusively Nazi candidates to sit in the new Reichstag. Goebbels commandeered Graf Zeppelin and the newly launched Hindenburg for the Reich Ministry of Public Enlightenment and Propaganda. The airships flew in tandem around Germany before the vote, with a joint departure from Löwenthal on the morning of 26 March. Millions of Germans watched from below as they toured the country for four days and three nights, dropping propaganda leaflets, playing martial music and slogans from large loudspeakers, and broadcasting political speeches from a makeshift radio studio on Hindenburg. The vote, held under the new Nuremberg Laws which disenfranchised the Jews, resulted in overwhelming support for the Nazis. After Eckener complained publicly about the propaganda flights, Goebbels made him an "unperson"; his name was not to be mentioned nor his photograph published.

On 1 May 1936, Hitler ordered that Graf Zeppelin fly over Berlin again as part of the May Day celebrations; later in May, it transported Goebbels on a visit to Italy, and gave the Marshal of the Air Force Italo Balbo an aerial tour of Rome. It was used later in the year as a backdrop for one of Hitler's Nuremberg Rallies.
