= Scherf (surname) =

- Language: German

Origin
- Region of origin: Germany

Scherf is a German surname. Notable people with the surname include:

- Charles Scherf (1917–1949), Australian flying ace of the Second World War
- Ferdinand Scherf (born 1943), German professor and historian
- Henning Scherf (born 1938), German lawyer and politician
- Lauren Scherf (born 1996), American basketball player
- Lindsey Scherf (born 1986), American long-distance runner

== See also ==
- Scherff
- Sherf
