= Sherf =

Sherf is a surname. Notable people with the surname include:

- John Sherf (1913–1991), American hockey player
- Ze'ev Sherf (1904–1984), Israeli politician
- Zvi Sherf (born 1951), Israeli basketball player and coach

== See also ==
- Scherf
- Scherf (surname)
- Scherff
