= Aristotle Kallis =

British historian (born 1970)

- Born: 1970 (age 55–56)
- Occupations: Historian, author, editor

Academic work
- Institutions: Keele University
- Main interests: Modern European history History of fascism Modern propaganda Totalitarianism
- Notable works: Germany and the Second World War, vol. IX/II

Aristotle Kallis (born 1970) is a British historian who specialises in modern European history, with an emphasis on the study of inter-war German and Italian fascism, as well as propaganda in Nazi Germany. He is an author and editor of several books on the subject of fascism and totalitarianism, including Genocide and Fascism: The Eliminationist Drive in Fascist Europe (2009). His 2005 book, Nazi Propaganda and the Second World War, deals with the subjects of Nazi propaganda and the Wehrmacht Propaganda Troops.

== Education and career ==
Kallis has taught history at the University of Edinburgh, University of Bristol and Lancaster University. In 2016, he was appointed as a professor of history at Keele University. He is a contributor to the seminal series Germany and the Second World War from the Military History Research Office (MGFA), where he covers the mobilisation of the German home front and Nazi propaganda.

== Genocide and Fascism: The Eliminationist Drive in Fascist Europe ==
Kallis's Genocide and Fascism: The Eliminationist Drive in Fascist Europe focuses on National Socialism as the key driver of the most radical outcome, that transformed the "eliminationist" policies into genocide in the service of the desired homogeneous nation-state. A review at H-Net finds, that although the author still sees parallels between fascism and Nazism,

Kallis concedes Nazism's unique synthesis, which joined the obsession with racial purity, the desirability of internal cleansing and territorial expansion to realize the "rebirth of the nation," and, finally, the radicalization of the technocratic social engineering of experts in fields ranging from biomedicine to demographics. (...) The massive effort to Germanize the East through the transfer or decimation of populations transformed the regime's "license to hate" into a "license to kill" when the difficulties of managing expansionism unleashed the ambitions of thousands of agents in the field to "solve" the problem in the most radical way possible.

The review goes on to praise the book for "the precision with which Kallis analyzes the movement from thoughts about eliminating an 'other' to their actualization":

The book is particularly effective in its discussion of the participation of fascist movements in occupied Europe, puppet governments, or governments otherwise allied with Nazi Germany, and countless ordinary people in the German East who availed themselves of the opportunity to act on an antisemitism that decades of upheaval had exacerbated.

== Selected works ==
- 2014: Rethinking Fascism and Dictatorship in Europe. Palgrave Macmillan. With António Costa Pinto ISBN 9781137384409.
- 2014: The Third Rome, 1922–1943: The Making of the Fascist Capital. Basingstoke: Palgrave Macmillan. ISBN 978-0230283992.
- 2009: Genocide and Fascism: The Eliminationist Drive in Fascist Europe. New York: Routledge. ISBN 978-0-415-33960-5.
- 2007: Nazi Propaganda and the Second World War. Palgrave-Macmillan. ISBN 978-0230546813.
- 2003: The Fascism Reader. London: Routledge.
- 2000: Fascist Ideology: Territory and Expansionism in Italy and Germany 1922−1945
