= Signal (magazine) =

German propaganda magazine published by the Wehrmacht during WWII

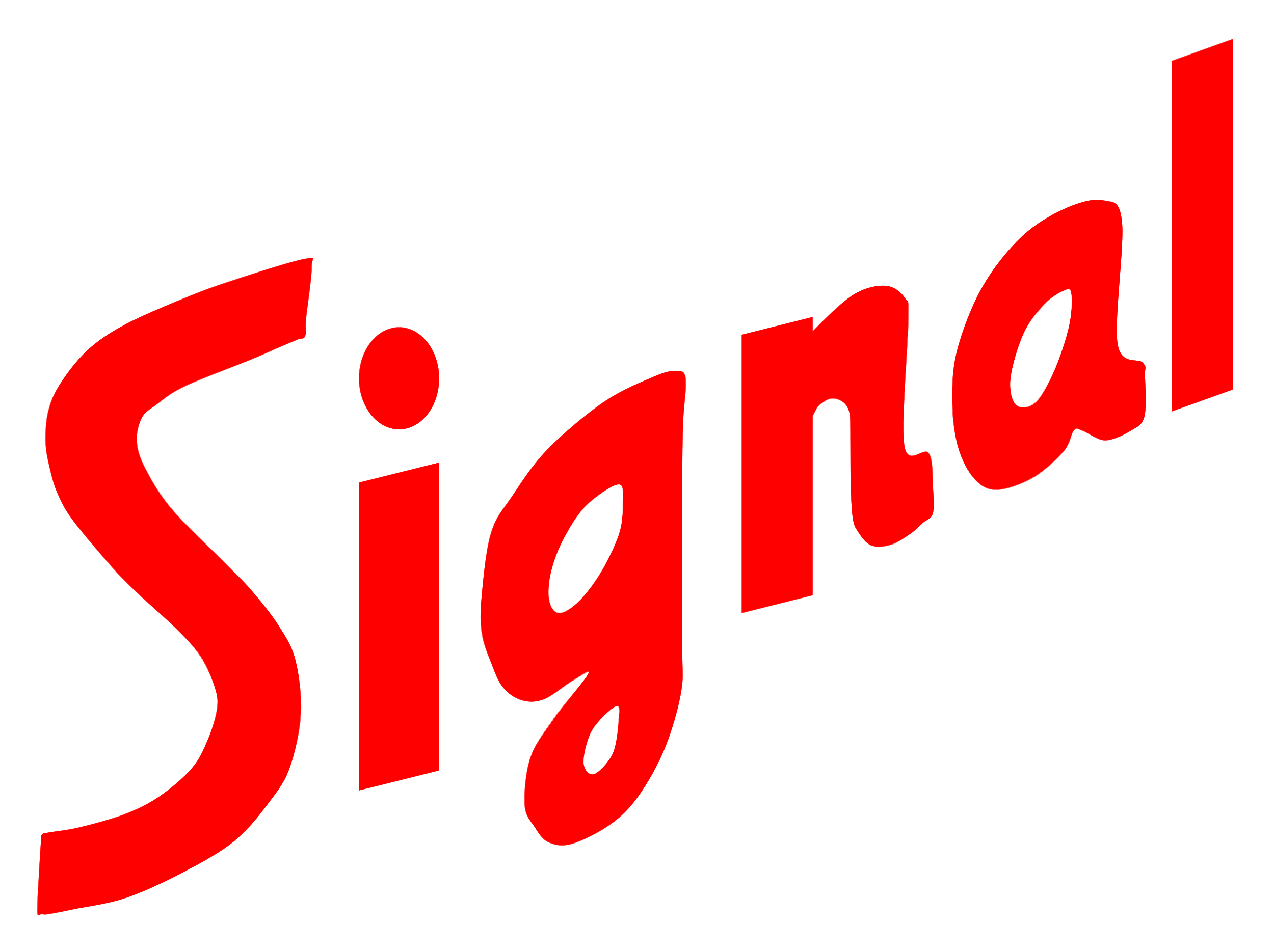
- Logo of the magazine
- Type: Propaganda publication
- Format: Biweekly magazine
- Owner: Wehrmacht
- Publisher: Deutscher Verlag on behalf of Wehrmacht Propaganda Troops
- Founded: April 1940
- Ceased publication: April 1945
- Language: 26 European languages
- Headquarters: Berlin, Germany
- Circulation: 2,500,000 (1943)

Signal was a magazine published by the Wehrmacht of Nazi Germany from 1940 through 1945.

== Summary ==
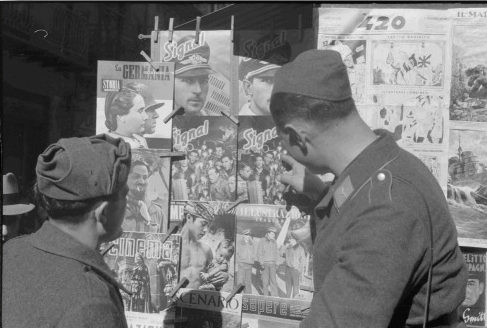
Italian and German soldiers viewing issues of Signal at a newspaper stand in Palermo, 1941

Signal was an illustrated photo journal and army propaganda tool, meant specifically for audiences in neutral, allied, and occupied countries. A German edition was distributed in Switzerland, Axis countries, and German-occupied Europe, but Signal was never distributed in Germany proper.

The journal was published by Ullstein Verlag and characterized by an outstanding print quality for the time. Each issue contained several (mostly eight) color pages, which was very unusual at the time.

The promoter of the magazine was the chief of the Wehrmacht Propaganda Troops, Colonel Hasso von Wedel. Signal was published fortnightly (plus some special issues) in as many as 25 editions and 30 languages, and at its height had a circulation of 2,500,000 copies. It was available in the United States in English until December 1941. The last number was 6/45, only known in one sample from the Swedish edition.

== See also ==
- Der Adler - Luftwaffe equivalent
- Kriegsmarine - German Navy equivalent
- Die Wehrmacht - Covering all the armed services
