= Dr. Mabuse the Gambler =

1922 film directed by Fritz Lang

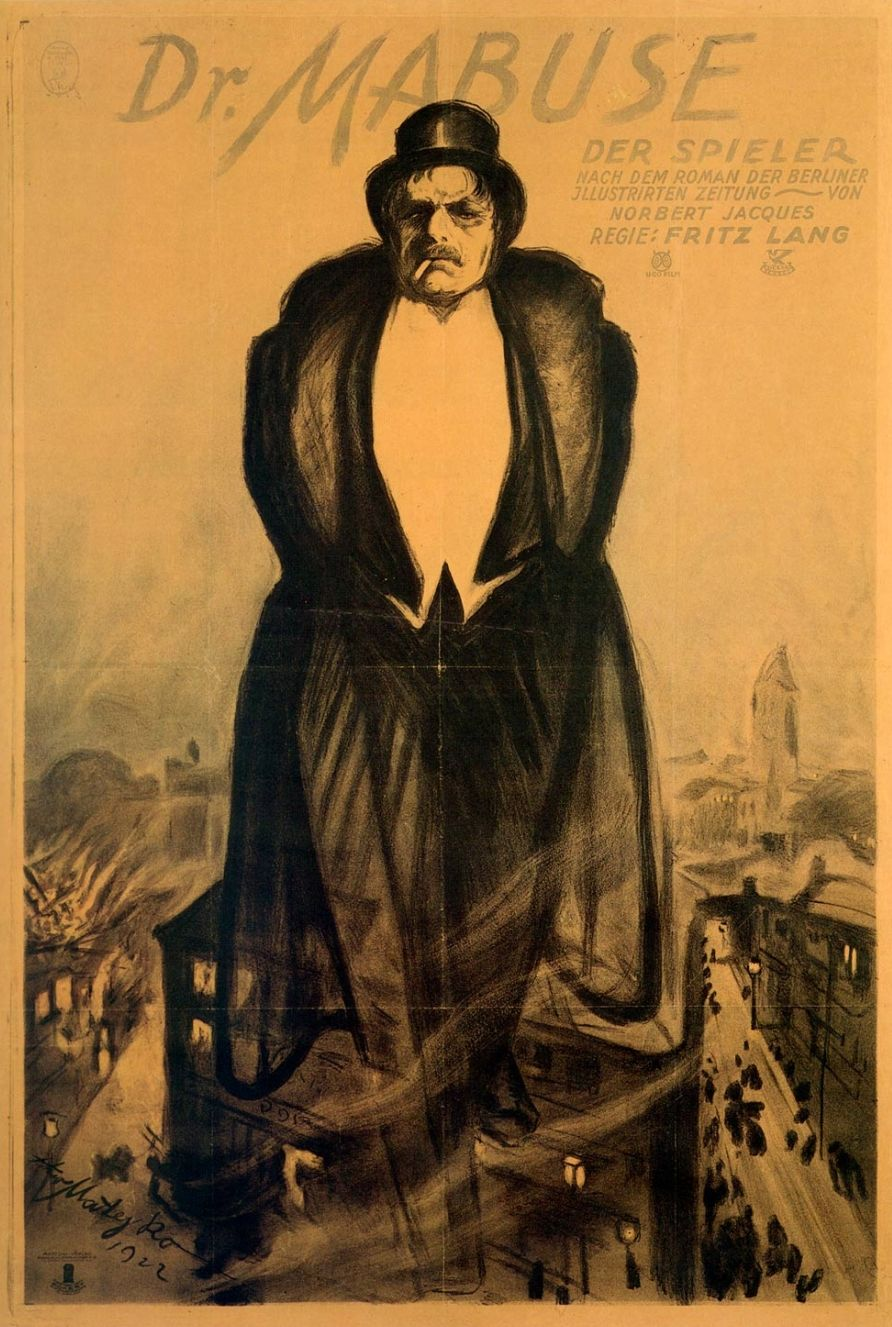
- Theatrical release poster by Theo Matejko
- Directed by: Fritz Lang
- Screenplay by: Fritz Lang; Thea von Harbou
- Based on: Doctor Mabuse by Norbert Jacques
- Produced by: Erich Pommer
- Starring: Rudolf Klein-Rogge; Aud Egede-Nissen; Gertrude Welcker; Alfred Abel; Bernhard Goetzke
- Cinematography: Carl Hoffmann
- Production company: Uco-Film GmbH
- Distributed by: Universum Film AG
- Release dates: 27 April 1922 (Part 1); 26 May 1922 (Part 2)
- Running time: 154 minutes (Part 1); 114 minutes (Part 2)
- Country: Germany
- Language: German intertitles

Dr. Mabuse the Gambler (German: Dr. Mabuse, der Spieler) is the first film in the Dr. Mabuse series about the character Doctor Mabuse who featured in the novels of Norbert Jacques. It was directed by Fritz Lang and released in 1922. The film is silent and would be followed by the sound sequels The Testament of Dr. Mabuse (1933) and The Thousand Eyes of Dr. Mabuse (1960).

It is four and a half hours long and divided into two parts, originally released a month apart: Der große Spieler: Ein Bild der Zeit and Inferno: Ein Spiel von Menschen unserer Zeit. The title, Dr. Mabuse, der Spieler, makes use of three meanings of the German Der Spieler which can mean gambler, puppeteer, or actor.

The film is included in the book 1001 Movies You Must See Before You Die, being the first of five Lang films to be included.

== Plot ==
=== Part I ===
Dr. Mabuse the Gambler, Part 1

The Great Gambler: A Picture of the Time (Der große Spieler: Ein Bild der Zeit)

Dr. Mabuse is a criminal mastermind, doctor of psychology, and master of disguise, armed with the powers of hypnosis and mind control, who oversees the counterfeiting and gambling rackets of the Berlin underworld. He visits gambling dens by night under various guises and aliases, using the power of suggestion to win at cards and finance his plans. Among his many henchmen are: Spoerri, his cocaine-addicted manservant; Georg, his chauffeur and sometime assassin; Pesch, an inept goon; Hawasch, who employs a gang of blind men in a counterfeiting operation; Fine, a woman who serves as a lookout and Folies Bergère dancer Cara Carozza, who loves him.

Mabuse orchestrates the theft of a commercial contract to create a temporary panic in the stock market, which he exploits to make huge profits. Edgar Hull, the son of a millionaire industrialist, becomes Mabuse's next victim. As "Hugo Balling", Mabuse gains access to Hull's gentlemen's club and wins a small fortune at cards from the hypnotized Hull, who is made to play badly and recklessly. Afterwards, Hull is unable to account for his behavior.

State prosecutor Norbert von Wenk takes an interest in Hull, believing he is the latest in a string of victims similarly tricked by the elusive "Great Unknown". Wenk goes undercover at a gambling den, where he encounters a disguised Dr. Mabuse. Mabuse attempts to hypnotize Wenk, but he resists. Mabuse flees. Wenk, quickly regaining his faculties, gives chase through the city but the doctor escapes. Boarding a taxicab driven by Georg, Wenk is gassed, robbed, and set adrift in a rowing boat.

Dr. Mabuse realizes that Hull is assisting the state prosecutor and resolves to eliminate them. Carozza, who has been romancing Hull on Mabuse's orders, lures the young man to a new illegal casino; when Wenk calls in the police to raid the place, Carozza, Hull and a police bodyguard exit through the back door, where Georg awaits. He kills Hull but Carozza is caught and jailed. Wenk questions her for information about the "Great Unknown" but she refuses to speak. Wenk enlists the aid of Countess Told (nicknamed the "Passive Lady"), an aristocrat bored by her dull husband and a thrill seeker, to try to get the information by trickery. The Countess is placed in the same cell, an apparent victim of another raid but Carozza is not fooled. Carozza reveals only her great love for Mabuse, ensuring her silence. The Countess, moved by Carozza's passion, tells Wenk that she cannot continue to assist him.

Dr. Mabuse does nothing to extricate Carozza from jail. He instead attends a séance where he meets Countess Told, who (while under his hypnotic influence) invites him to her house. Once there, Mabuse, taken by the Countess's beauty, decides to display his power by telepathically inducing her husband, Count Told, to cheat at poker. His guests are outraged when they detect it and the Countess faints. Dr. Mabuse uses the distraction to abduct her and imprison her in his lair.

=== Part II ===
Dr. Mabuse the Gambler, Part 2

Inferno: A Game for the People of our Age (Inferno: Ein Spiel von Menschen unserer Zeit)

A sick and disgraced Count Told seeks the help of Dr. Mabuse to treat his depression; Mabuse uses this chance to isolate the Count in his manor and cut off any inquiries about the Countess's whereabouts. The Count's condition worsens and he is tormented by hallucinations. Carozza is moved to a women's prison and again interrogated by Wenk. Fearing betrayal, Mabuse sanctions Carozza's death. Georg smuggles poison to her cell, which she takes out of loyalty. Another of Mabuse's henchmen, Pesch, bombs Wenk's office while posing as an electrician but Wenk is unharmed and Pesch detained. Mabuse – again fearing betrayal – arranges for Pesch to be killed by a sniper while being transported in a police wagon.

Intent on leaving town, Mabuse gives the Countess the choice of going with him voluntarily. Her refusal angers him and Mabuse vows that he will kill the Count. Through his powers of suggestion, he induces the Count to commit suicide with a razor blade. When Wenk investigates his death, he questions Dr. Mabuse as the Count's psychoanalyst. Dr. Mabuse speculates that the Count had fallen under the control of a hostile will and asks Wenk if he is familiar with the experiments of one "Sandor Weltmann", who will be performing a public demonstration of telepathy and mass hypnosis at a local theater.

Wenk and his men attend Weltmann's show. Weltmann is none other than Mabuse in disguise and his magic show provides him an opportunity to hypnotize Wenk, who falls into a trance. Mabuse's secret command to Wenk is to leave the auditorium, get in his car, and drive off a cliff, but Wenk's men intercede just in time. Coming to his senses, Wenk orders a siege of Mabuse's house.

Dr. Mabuse and his men make a last stand. In the gunfight, Hawasch and Fine are killed, Spoerri and Georg are taken into custody and the Countess is rescued. Dr. Mabuse flees through an underground sewer to Hawasch's counterfeiting workshop, where he becomes trapped, as the doors cannot be opened from the inside. Mabuse is confronted by the ghosts of his victims and various demonic illusions. Spoerri, under interrogation, identifies a key found at Mabuse's mansion as being for the workshop. Wenk and the police break in and take the insane Dr. Mabuse away.

== Cast ==
- Rudolf Klein-Rogge as Dr. Mabuse
- Aud Egede-Nissen as Cara Carozza
- Gertrude Welcker as Gräfin Dusy Told
- Alfred Abel as Graf Told / Richard Fleury (US version)
- Bernhard Goetzke as State prosecutor Norbert von Wenk / Chief-Inspector De Witt (US version)
- Paul Richter as Edgar Hull
- Robert Forster-Larrinaga as Spoerri
- Hans Adalbert Schlettow as Georg, the Chauffeur
- Georg John as Pesch
- Charles Puffy as Hawasch
- Grete Berger as Fine, a servant
- Julius Falkenstein as Karsten
- Lydia Potechina as Die Russin / Russian woman
- Julius E. Herrmann as Emil Schramm
- Julietta Brandt (uncredited)
- Max Adalbert (uncredited)
- Anita Berber (uncredited)
- Paul Biensfeldt (uncredited)
- Gustav Botz (uncredited)
- Lil Dagover (uncredited)
- Heinrich Gotho (uncredited)

== Production ==
Production of the first part of Dr. Mabuse the Gambler began while the novel on which it is based, Norbert Jacques's Dr. Mabuse, der Spieler was still being serialized. The film made a number of important changes from the book version. In the book the characters engage in constant soliloquies which would not have adapted well to film, particularly a silent film which would have required many intertitles to make that work. The film also eliminated a subplot in which Mabuse's actions are shown to be motivated by a desire to create his own country within South America. Film historian David Kalat points out that by eliminating reference to Mabuse's motivation Lang starts to dehumanize the character, which helped lead to the character becoming a franchise. But Kalat also notes that this eliminates the irony of the fact that Mabuse was seen by many viewers as a representation of aspects of Adolf Hitler, and many Nazis actually fled to South America after World War II.

Lang and von Harbou also added some elements to the film that were not in the novel. One of Mabuse's key skills in the film is as a counterfeiter, but in the novel he never engaged in this. Mabuse's role in counterfeiting money adds to the social subtext and to the themes of the film. The film's opening, a 20-minute tour de force introducing the myth of Mabuse, was also not in the novel. The introduction starts with Mabuse shuffling a deck of photos like playing cards which will determine which disguise he will use that day and culminates with Mabuse manipulating a stock market crash. Kalat traces the inspiration for this sequence to Louis Feuillade's 1913 Fantômas II: Juve contre Fantômas (Juve vs. Fantômas). The ending to the second part of Dr. Mabuse is also unique to the film.

The film incorporates a number of special effects such as animation and superimpositions. One aspect that was cheered upon the film's original release was the nighttime scene of the automobile chase in which Wenk chases Mabuse, which David Kalat called the most successful execution of such nighttime photography to that time.

It was during the production of this film that Lang and von Harbou began their affair which would ultimately result in their marriage. Although von Harbou was married to Klein-Rogge at the time, their separation was amicable and did not create a problem for the film.

== Themes ==
A key theme of the film is the dissolution of German society after World War I. The film portrays but exaggerates the difficult conditions during the period making the film's world a dystopia. The worthless counterfeit money created by Mabuse reflects the nearly worthless Deutsche Mark during the hyperinflation resulting from the Weimar Republic printing excessive money to pay war reparations. The stock market swings, gambling parlors and miserable living conditions for poor people depicted in the film were also reflections of conditions in Germany at the time.

The character of Dr. Mabuse can also be seen as depiction of "the power of evil or a distorted inner psyche". Lang scholar Paul Jensen interpreted Mabuse as "a symbol to unite all the negative factors in Germany at the time". The film depicts difficult problems such as rampant crime, worthless money and a volatile stock market as thus being under the control of a single man. Bernd Widdig points out that while Dr. Mabuse is not an anti-Semitic film, aspects of Mabuse's character may have reflected contemporary stereotypes of Jews, especially since he acts in stereotypically Jewish roles such as psychoanalyst, banker, peddler and revolutionary, and consistent with the views on Jews of some contemporary Germans his manipulations were responsible for problems in society. A contemporary Nazi critic wrote that Mabuse is "a quintessential Jewish figure" who goes through time with the singular goal of "mastery of the world" regardless of the consequences to others and whose descent into insanity caused his crimes to go unpunished in what the Nazi critic described as "the typical case of the Jewish criminal". On the other hand, Mabuse with his hypnotic power over the masses in pursuit of evil has also been seen as a foreshadowing of Adolf Hitler. In the sequel The Testament of Dr. Mabuse the link between the Mabuse character and the Nazis is made stronger. Lang stated that he viewed Mabuse as a Nietzschean Übermensch. Lang also saw Mabuse's character as emblematic of a certain kind of money-accumulator in Weimar Germany referred to as a "Raffke". The producer of Dr. Mabuse, Erich Pommer, saw the film as a depiction of the contemporary conflict between the liberal conservatives and the Marxist Spartacists in which the Mabuse character represented the Spartacists, yet another view saw populist themes in the film.

Another theme in the film is surveillance and seeing without being seen. Yet another theme is that of being versus seeming, portrayed through Mabuse's disguises and through buildings whose interiors seem inconsistent with their exteriors.

== Reception ==
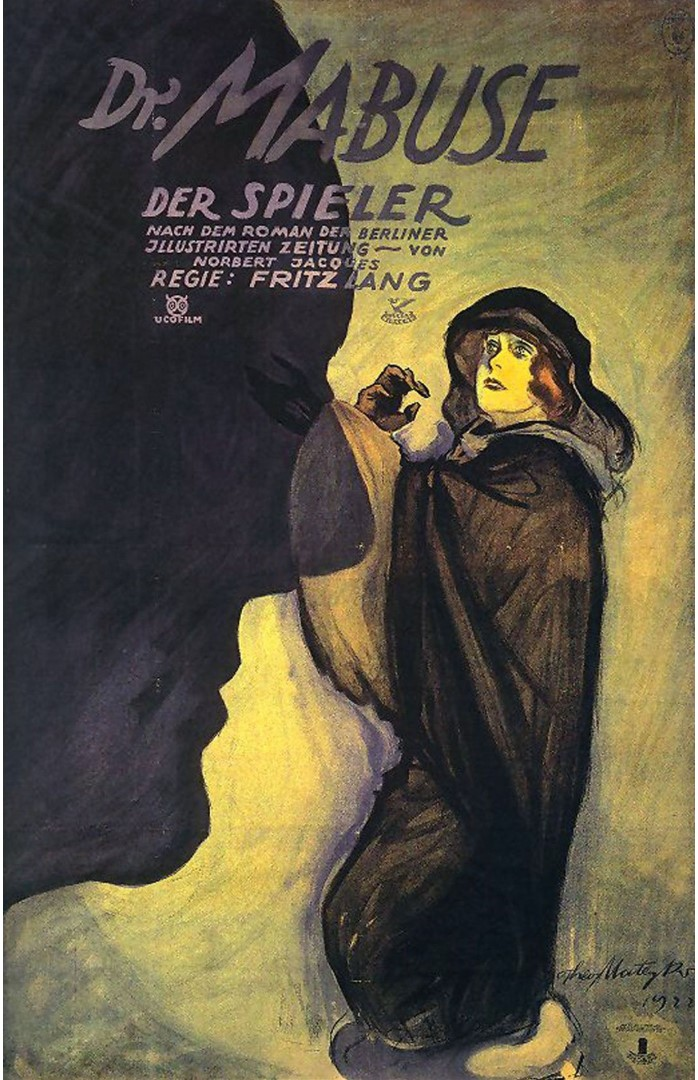
German release poster, by Theo Matejko

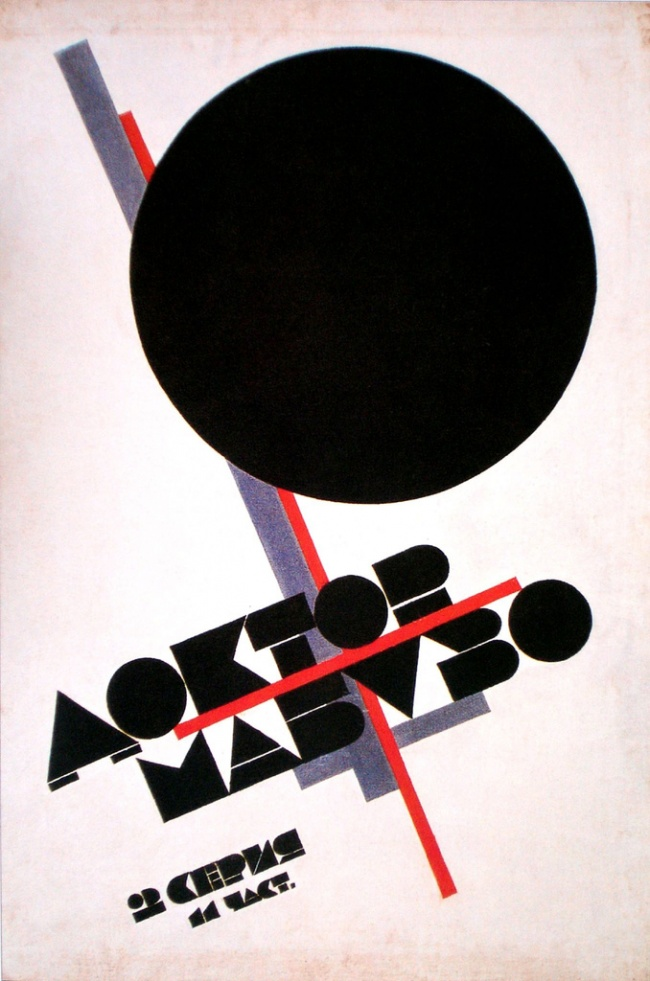
Soviet release poster, by Kazimir Malevich

Berliner Illustrirte Zeitung called the first part "the attempt to create an image of our chaotic times" in its 30 April 1922 issue. It went on to state that it "will give people fifty or one hundred years from now an idea of an age that they could hardly comprehend without such a document." Film-Kurier praised Klein-Rogge's "brilliant performance" and Lang's "sensitive yet experienced" direction.

When the film was released in the United States in 1927, in a single film that was less than half the length of the original 2-part version, The New York Times criticized it for being too long and for the "hyperbolic overacting". But when the full length version finally was released in the United States at the 1973 New York Film Festival, Times critic Nora Sayre praised it as being "something very good" and "possibly the hit of the festival".

Variety praised the film's plot for its "speed and life" while acknowledging that it can be confusing. Variety felt the best parts of the movie were the scenes between Mabuse and Von Wenk. Variety praised several of the acting performances but felt Klein-Rogge was too small to be fully effective in the role, and praised some of Lang's technical effects while criticizing the overlong intertitles. Time Out criticized the film for its "disorganised and erratically paced" narrative and "shaky" grasp of social reality but praised its "flashes of inspiration". Entertainment Weekly reviewer Tim Purtell rated the film an A−, comparing the titular villain to those in the James Bond and Mission Impossible movies. Purtell particularly praised the "sharp" plot turns, "stunning visuals" and Klein-Rogge's performance. Leonard Maltin gave it three and a half of four stars: "Brilliantly directed, designed, and photographed." Leslie Halliwell gave it three of four stars: "A real wallow in German post-war depression and melodrama, in the form of a Fu Manchu / Moriarty type thriller. Fascinating scene by scene, but by now a slightly tiresome whole."

Film review aggregator Rotten Tomatoes reported an approval rating of 93%, based on 14 reviews, with a rating average of 7.5/10. In a list of the 100 most important German films, compiled in 1994 by the Association of German Cinémathèques, Dr. Mabuse the Gambler was placed at #17. Akira Kurosawa, the legendary Japanese director, named this movie as one of his 100 favorite films.
