= Wehrmacht Propaganda Troops =

Branch within the Wehrmacht and the Waffen-SS

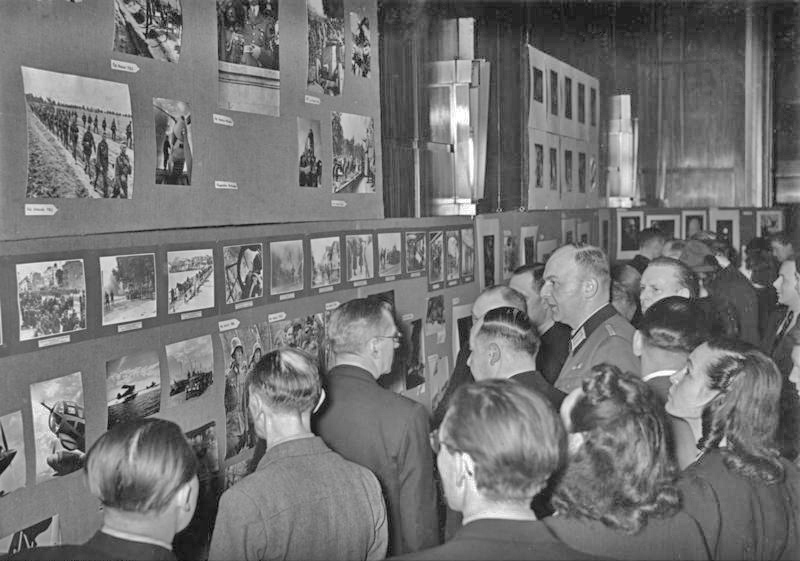
1940 exhibition of photographs produced by propaganda companies during the invasion of Poland

Wehrmacht Propaganda Troops (German: Wehrmachtpropaganda, abbreviated as WPr) was a branch of service of the Wehrmacht and the Waffen-SS of Nazi Germany during World War II. Subordinated to the High Command of the Wehrmacht (the Oberkommando der Wehrmacht), its function was to produce and disseminate propaganda materials aimed at the German troops and the population. The propaganda troops were part of the Propaganda in Nazi Germany.

== Planning and formation ==
The planning for propaganda activities by the Wehrmacht began in 1938. Joseph Goebbels, the head of Ministry of Propaganda, sought to establish effective cooperation with the Wehrmacht to ensure a smooth flow of propaganda materials from the front. He deferred to the military in setting up and controlling the propaganda companies, but provided assistance in supplying personnel.

== Function and operation ==
The service was subordinated to the OKW Chief of Operation Staff, General Alfred Jodl. Commanded by General Hasso von Wedel, the department oversaw the numerous propaganda companies (Propagandakompanie or PK) of the Wehrmacht and the Waffen-SS, attached to the fighting troops. At its peak in 1942, the propaganda troops included 15,000 men.

The propaganda companies were the only news-reporting units in areas of military operation, as civilian news correspondents were prohibited from entering combat zones. The troops produced the written, audio and film materials from the front and sent them to a processing center in Germany, where they were reviewed by censors, mostly for security purposes. The filtered materials were then forwarded to the Ministry of Propaganda for immediate dissemination. Among the propaganda materials produced was the Wehrmachtbericht, the official news communiqué about the military situation of the Reich, and was intended for both domestic and foreign consumption.

== Publications ==
Propaganda publications in support of the war effort by the Wehrmacht and the Waffen-SS included:

- Die Deutsche Wochenschau – weekly newsreel series
- Der Adler – biweekly magazine of the Luftwaffe, the air force
- Our Fighter Pilots – series of Heftroman (pulp booklets), focusing on the Luftwaffe fighter force
- Eagle Library – propaganda series published under the auspices of Hermann Göring, the head of the Luftwaffe
- Signal - illustrated magazine, published in various languages
