= Ludwig Dettmann =

German painter

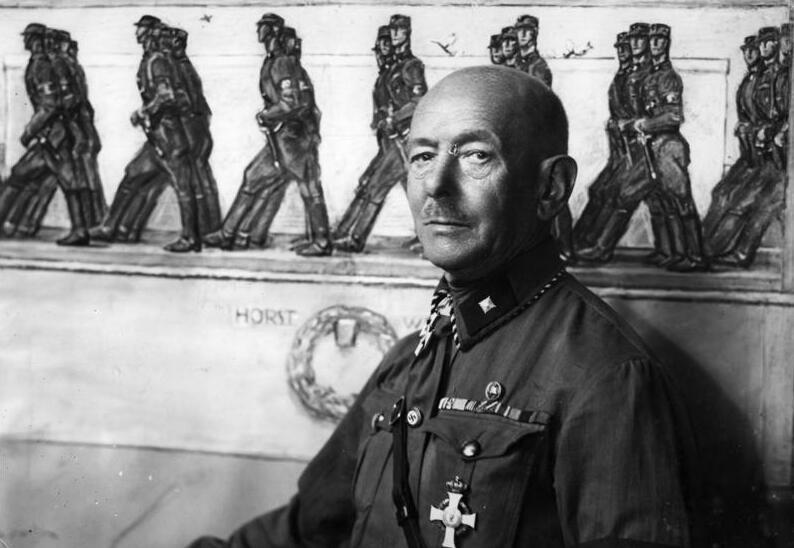
- Dettmann in his Sturmabteilung uniform, 1935
- Born: Ludwig Julius Christian Dettmann; 25 July 1865; Adelby, Kingdom of Prussia
- Died: 19 November 1944 (aged 79); Berlin, Nazi Germany
- Education: Prussian Academy of Arts
- Movement: Impressionism

Ludwig Julius Christian Dettmann (25 July 1865 – 19 November 1944) was a German Impressionist painter. Shortly before his death, he was added to the Gottbegnadeten list, a roster of artists considered crucial to Nazi culture.

== Biography ==
Dettmann was born in the Prussian town of Adelby, now a part of Flensburg. His father was a customs officer who was transferred to Hamburg while Ludwig was still a small child. After some studies at a local arts and crafts school, he transferred to the Prussian Academy of Arts, where he studied with Eugen Bracht and Franz Skarbina. He originally worked as an illustrator.

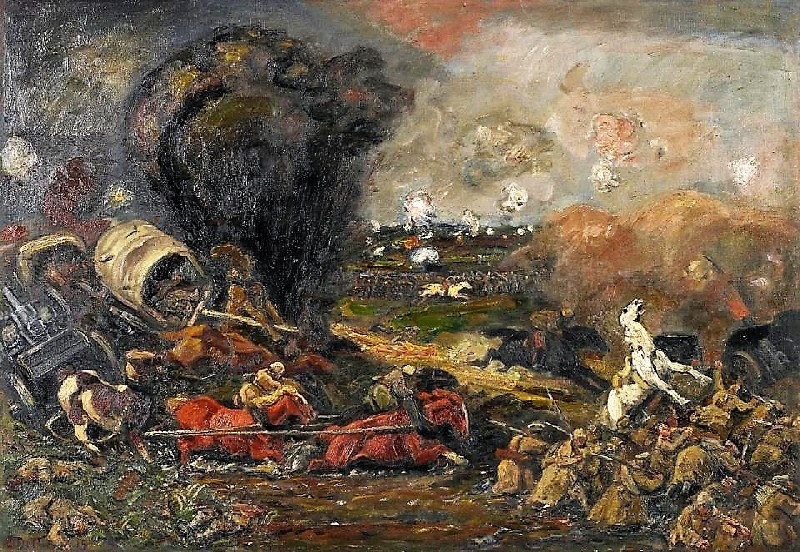
Battle Scene

After 1891, he was a teacher at the drawing and painting school of the Verein der Berliner Künstlerinnen". In 1894, he won a small gold medal at the "Great Berlin Art Exhibition", a major annual event that ran from 1893 to 1969. (He would win a large gold medal there in 1909).

Under the influence of Max Liebermann, he turned to landscape painting in oils and watercolors. His first major project consisted of four murals at the town hall in Altona, depicting the city's history.

In 1898, he was one of the founders of the Berlin Secession and, together with Max Liebermann, Walter Leistikow, Otto Heinrich Engel, Oskar Frenzel, Curt Herrmann and Fritz Klimsch, was a member of the advisory board. In 1900, he was appointed Director of the Kunstakademie Konigsberg. He also belonged to the committee charged with selecting artists for the popular trading cards in Stollwerck chocolates.

In 1915, he organized the Army and Marine exhibition, composed of heroic war and battle scenes. It was shown at the Berlin Academy and at the Königsberger Art Association the following year. He contributed portraits of Generals Erich Ludendorff and Paul von Hindenburg. For the remainder of the war, he was an official war artist.

After the war, he returned to Berlin. In 1923, he illustrated both volumes of Weltbrand – Deutschlands Tragödie 1914–1918 (Conflagration, Germany's Tragedy), a detailed examination of the war and its aftermath by the novelist Walter Bloem, an ardent nationalist. In October 1928, with Theo Matejko, he was invited on the first transatlantic flight of the airship Graf Zeppelin, where he made an artistic record of the voyage.

After Hitler seized power, Dettmann joined the Nazi Party and served on the board of the "Reichsverband bildender Künstler Deutschlands" (Reich Association of Visual Artists). He would remain a party member until his death. In 1935, he was awarded the "Goethe-Medaille für Kunst und Wissenschaft" and was chairman of the "Association of Berlin Artists" for the year 1936–37.

In 1938 he wrote Ostfront. Ein Denkmal des Deutschen Kampfes (Eastern Front, a Monument to the German Struggle). Shortly before his death in Berlin in 1944, his name was added to the Gottbegnadeten list of artists crucial to Nazi culture. In 1946, Ostfront was placed on the "Liste der auszusondernden Literatur" ("weeded-out" literature), a list of Nazi works that were forbidden in the Soviet occupation zone.

== Selected paintings ==
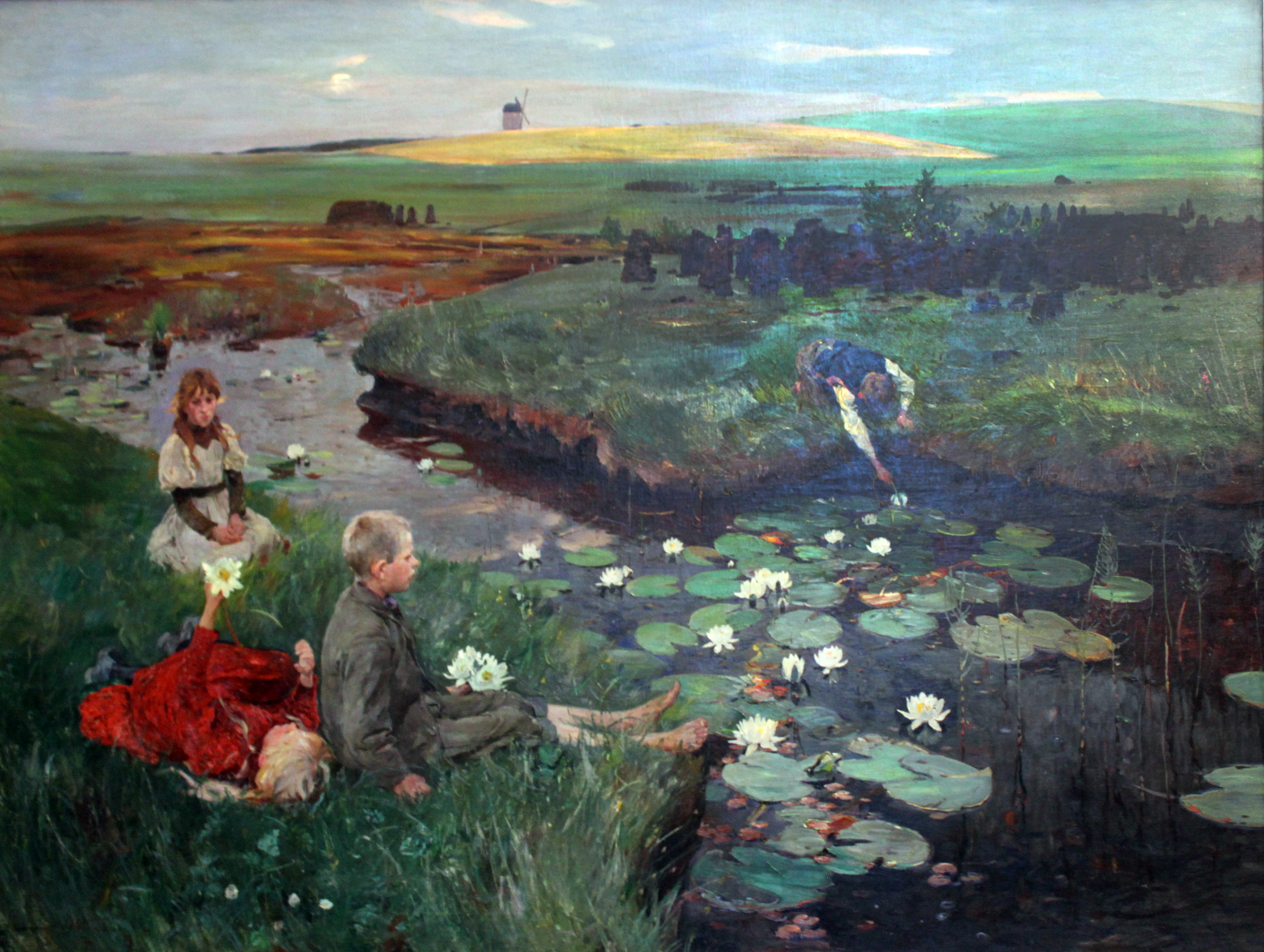
By the Waterlilies in the Moor, 1897

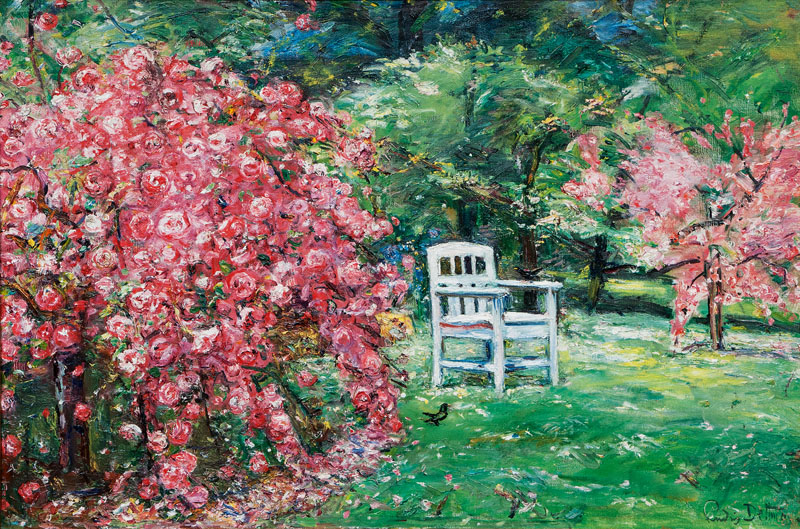
Garden with Chair

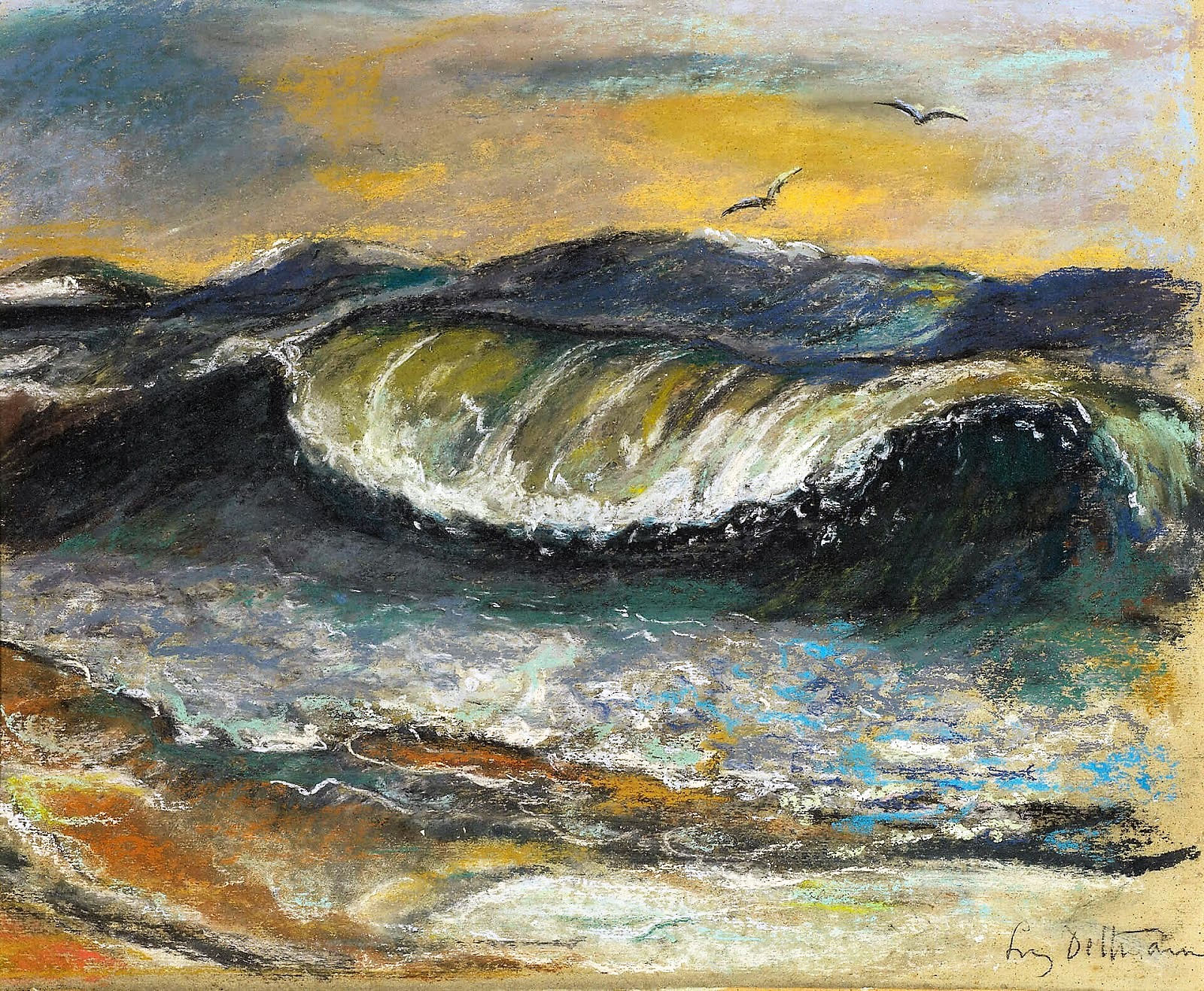
Wave

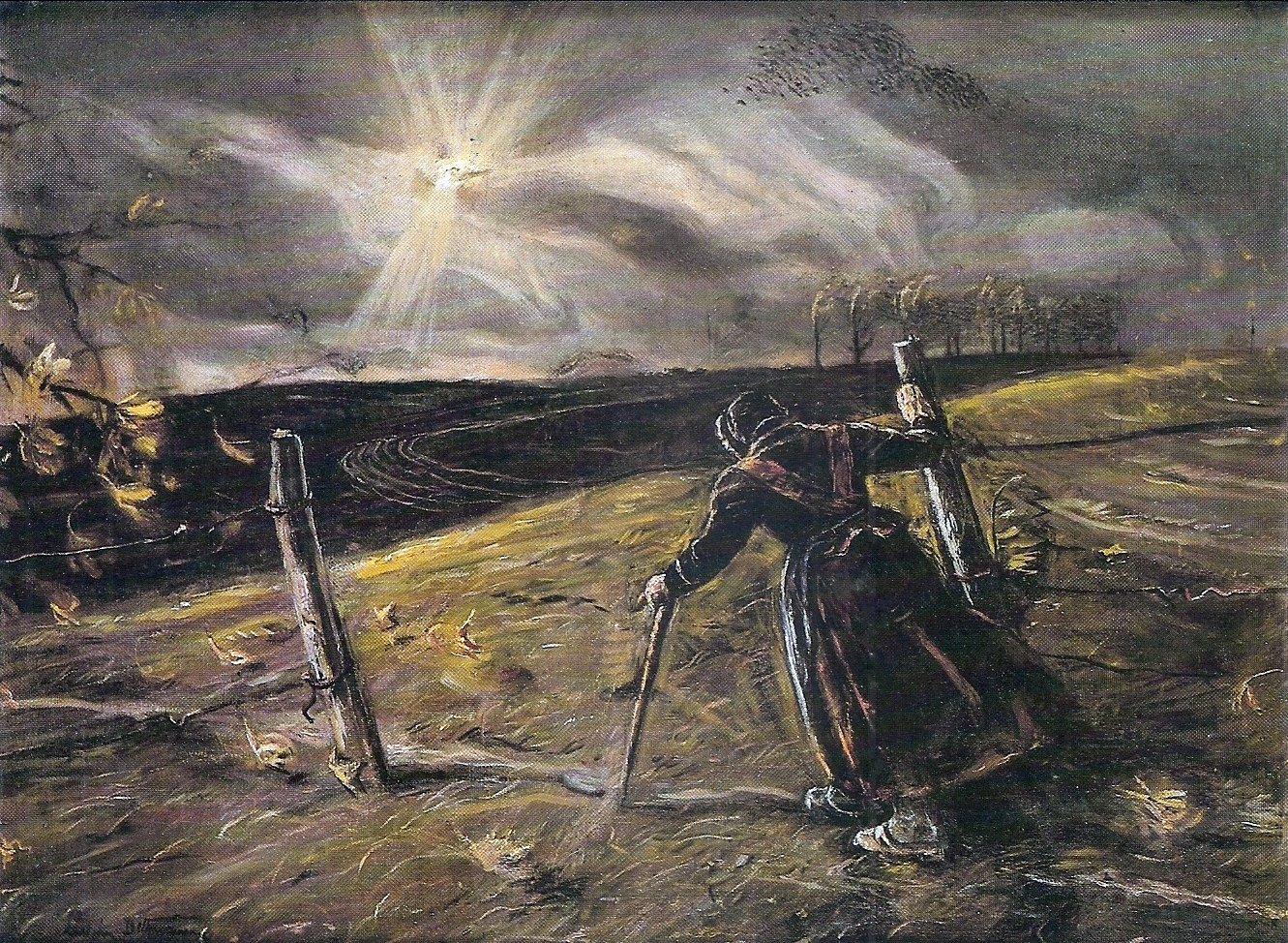
The Autumn of Life
