= Der Adler =

Biweekly propaganda magazine of the Luftwaffe

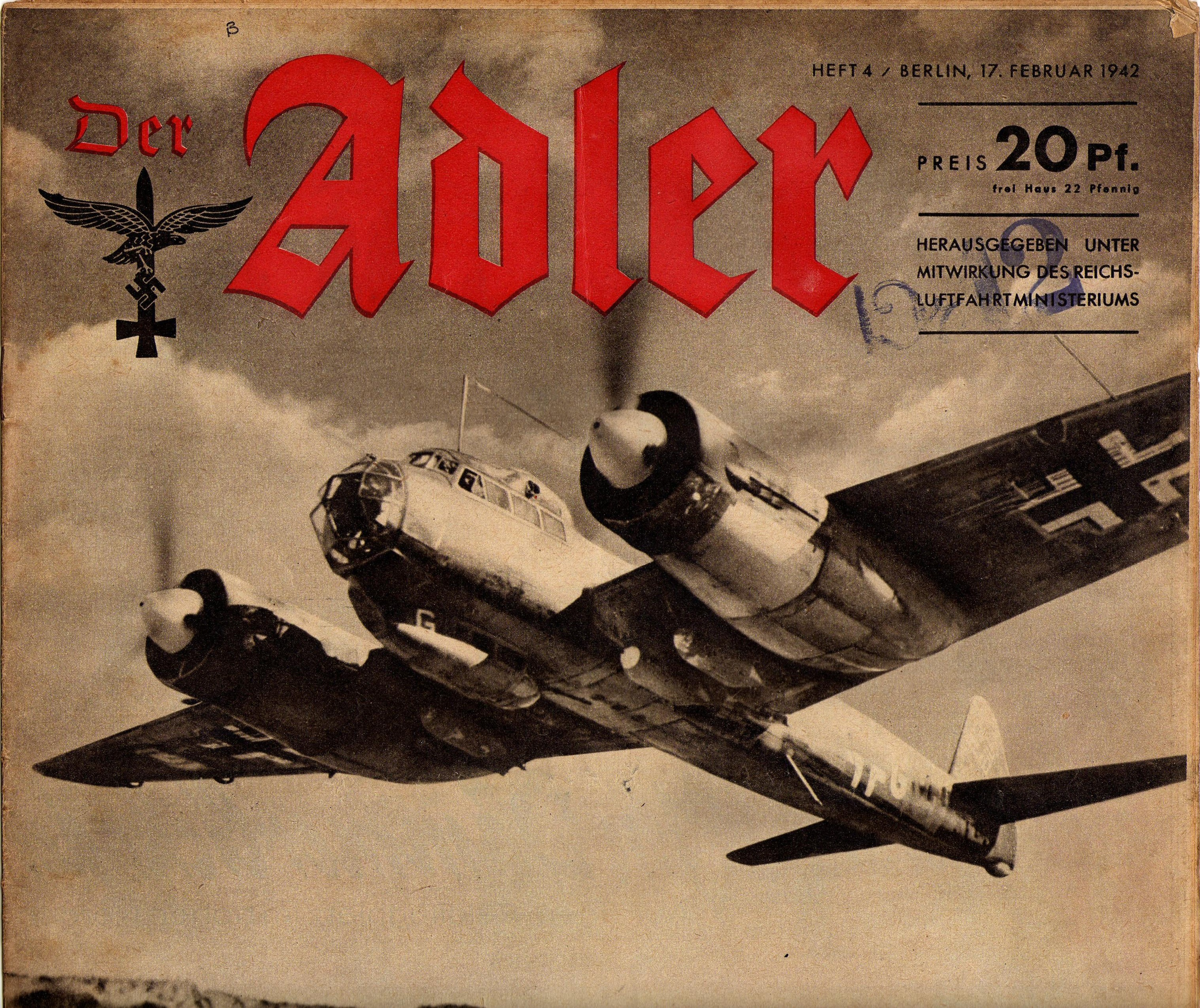
- Categories: Nazi propaganda magazine
- Frequency: Every two weeks
- First issue: 1 March 1939
- Final issue: 12 September 1944
- Country: Nazi Germany
- Language: English, French, German, Italian, Spanish and Romanian

Der Adler (literally "The Eagle") was a biweekly Nazi propaganda magazine published by the Scherl Verlag, founded by August Scherl, with the support of the Luftwaffe High Command. From 1939 to 1944, 146 magazine issues were published in total. Each magazine had 24 to 36 pages, but the amount of pages was reduced to 12 when the fall of Nazi Germany was near.

== See also ==
- Signal — Army equivalent
- Die Wehrmacht — Covering all the armed services
