= Theo Matejko =

Austrian painter and illustrator

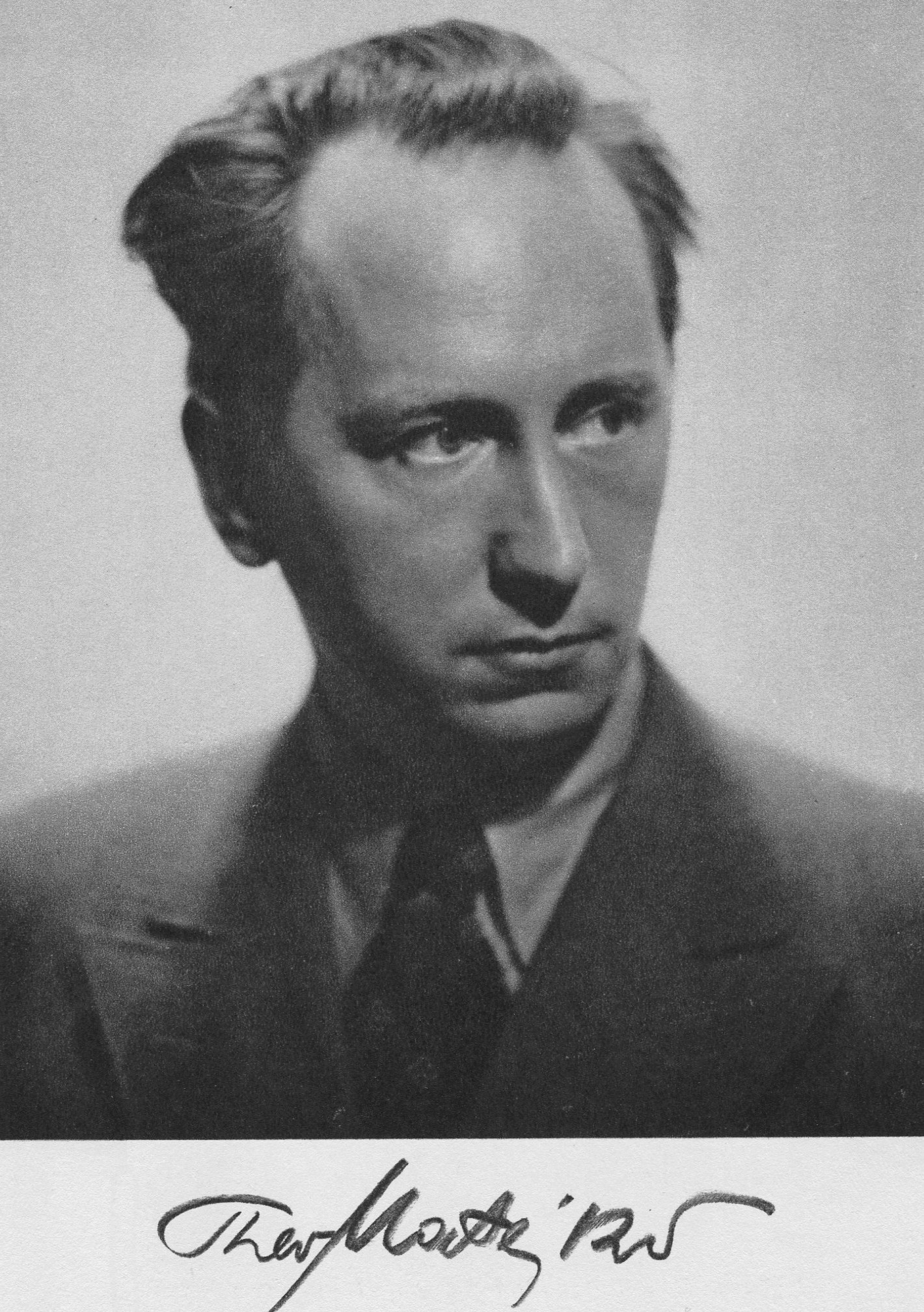
- Born: 18 June 1893; Vienna, Austria
- Died: 9 September 1946 (aged 53); Thiersee, Austria

Theo Matejko (18 June 1893 – 9 September 1946) was an Austrian illustrator.

He served in World War I and covered racing car events. In October 1928, with Ludwig Dettmann, he was invited on the first transatlantic flight of the airship Graf Zeppelin, where he made an artistic record of the voyage.

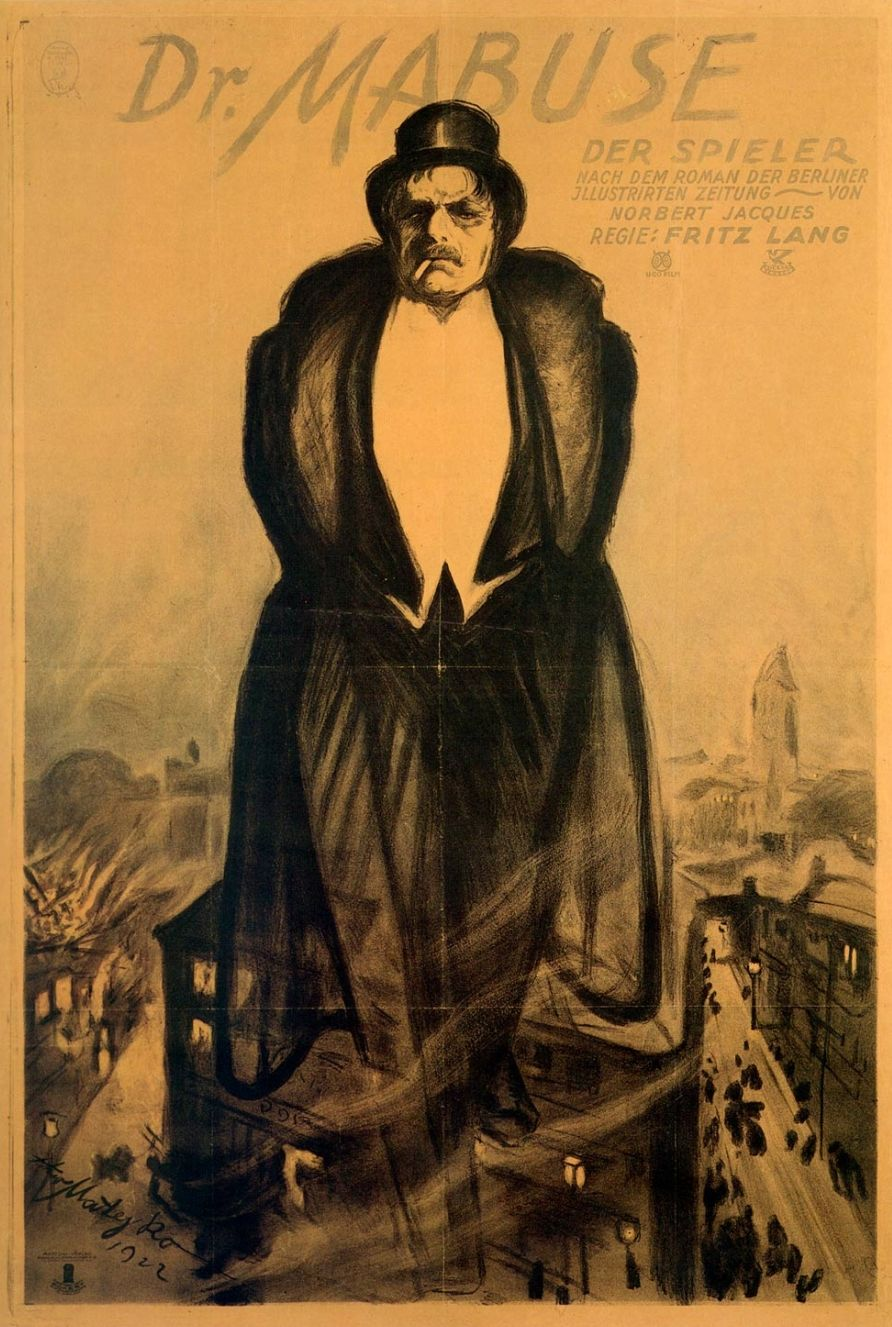
Dr. Mabuse, der Spieler theatrical release poster, by Theo Matejko.

In 1933, he became involved with the Nazis and created propaganda materials. He was involved in the design work for the posters for the 1936 Olympics. He worked on Die Wehrmacht magazine during World War II; at the beginning of the war, he published a series of drawings depicting the horrors of indiscriminate bombing on civilians.

In 1961 the Museum of Modern Art in New York City had an exhibition of his film posters. His work is collected in museums like the Imperial War Museum the Victoria and Albert Museum. and the Stedelijk Museum in Amsterdam.
