= Hasso von Wedel (general) =

German general (1898-1961)

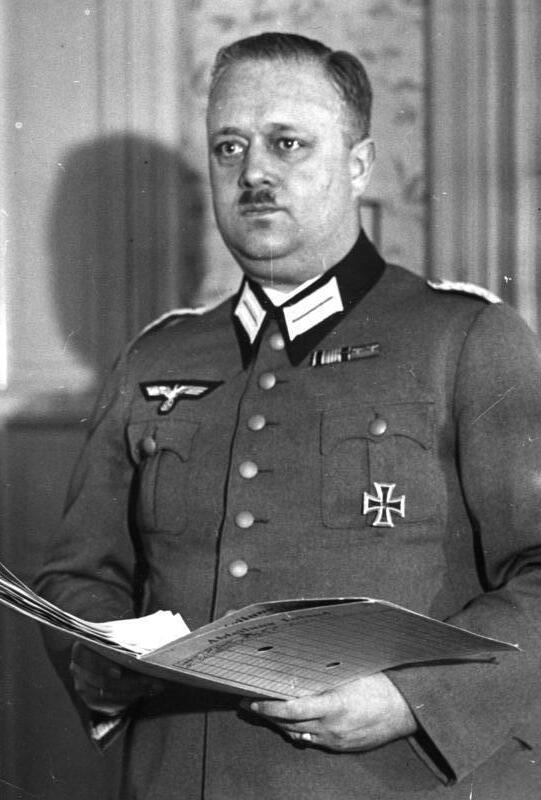
- Wedel in 1938

Chief of Wehrmacht Propaganda Troops
- In office 1 September 1939 – 6 May 1945

Personal details
- Born: 20 November 1898
- Died: 3 January 1961 (aged 62)

Military service
- Allegiance: German Empire; Weimar Republic; Nazi Germany
- Branch/service: German Army
- Years of service: 1916–1945
- Rank: Generalmajor
- Battles/wars: World War I World War II
- Awards: War Merit Cross with Swords

Hasso von Wedel (20 November 1898 – 3 January 1961) was a German general who commanded the Wehrmacht Propaganda Troops during World War II. He was directly subordinate to the head of OKW Operations Staff (Wehrmachtführungsstab, WFSt.), General Alfred Jodl. Wedel's Propaganda Department had control over the propaganda units and served to mediate between them and the Reich Propaganda Ministry of Joseph Goebbels.

After the capitulation of Nazi Germany, Wedel was taken prisoner by US troops on 6 May 1945 and released on 18 May 1946. Wedel described his experience on war propaganda in an apologetic account written between 1957 and 1958 and published after his death under the title Die Propagandatruppen der Deutschen Wehrmacht ("The Wehrmacht's Propaganda Troops"). For example, he described the relations between the Wehrmacht and civilian propaganda organizations as allegedly problematic, while they cooperated successfully and effectively throughout the war.

Wedel and Alfred Ingemar Berndt were editors of Deutschland im Kampf, a book series, 43 volumes, almost 10,000 pages, covering every battle in which the German Army, Kriegsmarine and Luftwaffe were involved, from the invasion of Poland in September 1939 to mid-1944.

== Books authored (German) ==
- Schießtechnik und Taktik des einzelnen f. M.G. in 26 Kampfaufgaben mit Lösungen. Berlin 1928
- Zwanzig Jahre deutsche Wehrmacht. Berlin 1939
- Der Kampf im Westen. München: Raumbild-Verlag Otto Schönstein, 1940. OCLC 15749886
- Der Feldherr Adolf Hitler und seine Marschälle. Leipzig 1941
- Die Propagandatruppen der Deutschen Wehrmacht. Hrsg. von Hermann Teske. Neckargemünd 1962
- Germany at War (Deutschland im Kampf) (Otto Stollberg, Berlin 1939-1944). Alfred Ingemar Berndt and Hasso von Wedel, editors.
- Defense Education and People's Education (Wehrerziehung und Volkserziehung) Hanseatische Verlagsanstalt Hamburg 1938

== Bibliography ==
- Daniel Uziel: The Propaganda Warriors. The Wehrmacht and the Consolidation of the German Home Front. Peter Lang, Oxford 2008, ISBN 978-3-03911-532-7.
- Daniel Uziel. "Wehrmacht Propaganda Troops and the Jews" (PDF). Yad Vashem.
