= Daniel Uziel =

Israeli historian (born 1967)

Daniel Uziel (Hebrew: דניאל עזיאל; born 1967) is an Israeli historian and head of photographic collections at Yad Vashem. His doctoral thesis was on the Wehrmacht propaganda corps and was accepted in 2001 by Hebrew University in Jerusalem.

== Works ==
- Uziel, Daniel (2008). The Propaganda Warriors: The Wehrmacht and the Consolidation of the German Home Front. Peter Lang. ISBN 978-3-03911-532-7.
- Uziel, Daniel (2011). Arming the Luftwaffe: The German Aviation Industry in World War II. McFarland. ISBN 978-0-7864-8879-7.
