= Walter Scherff =

German army officer and military historian (1898–1945)

- Born: 1 November 1898; Cannstatt, Kingdom of Württemberg, German Empire
- Died: 24 May 1945 (aged 46); Saalfelden near Zell am See, Allied-occupied Germany
- Spouse(s): ∞ 1922 Ella, née Haas, widowed Schefold
- Children: 3 children; stepson Wolfgang "Wolf" Schefold (1916–2014) and daughters Hildegard (1922–1931) and Ursula (b. 1933)
- Military career
- Allegiance: German Empire; Weimar Republic; Nazi Germany
- Branch: Imperial German Army; Freikorps; Reichswehr; German Army
- Service years: 1915–1945
- Rank: Generalmajor
- Conflicts: World War I World War II
- Awards: Iron Cross; War Merit Cross

Karl Walter Scherff (1 November 1898 – 24 May 1945) was a German army officer and military historian with the rank of Generalmajor, who was appointed by Adolf Hitler to the Oberkommando der Wehrmacht in May 1942 to compile the history of the war, as the Führer's Commissioner for the Writing of Military History.

== Early career ==
Walter Scherff was born on 1 November 1898 in Cannstatt, Württemberg as the son of construction council. At the age of 17 he passed his Kriegsabitur (war time diploma, a school leaving certificate under accelerated conditions) and was assigned as Fahnenjunker (Cadet Officer) to the replacement battalion of 127th Infantry Regiment (9. Württembergisches Infanterie-Regiment Nr. 127) in Ulm.

Scherff was transferred to the Western Front few weeks later and was promoted to Fähnrich (Officer candidate) in September 1916. He participated in the Battle of the Somme and rose to the capacity of Platoon leader. Scherff was commissioned Leutnant (Second Lieutenant) in February 1917 and took part in the combats in Lorraine, Aisne and Verdun. Scherff was later wounded in action and following his recovery, he served as Battalion's Adjutant in his regiment. For his service during the War, he was decorated with both classes of the Prussian Iron Cross and also received Württemberg Military Merit Medal for bravery.

== Interwar period ==
Following the War, Scherff fought with the Freikorps of Württemberg as part of the Gruppenkommando West (Group Command West) against the communists of the Bavarian Soviet Republic. He was then was accepted into the new Army of Germany, the Reichswehr, limited by the terms of Treaty of Versailles only to 100,000 men. He served with 26th Rifle Regiment (Reichswehr-Schützen-Regiment 26) as company commander, before he was transferred to the 13th Infantry Regiment in Ludwigsburg in early 1920. Scherff was appointed Adjutant of 3rd Battalion of his regiment in Ulm in 1923 and while in this capacity, he was promoted to Oberleutnant (First Lieutenant) in April 1925.

In early 1927, Scherff assumed duty as commander of 12th Company (Machine Gun) in his regiment and remained in that capacity until October that year, when he was transferred to the regimental staff under Colonel Kurt von Greiff. He later led 8th Company (Machine Gun) of his regiment until October 1929, when he was assigned to the staff of 5th Division under Generalleutnant Hans Freiherr Seutter von Lötzen, his former Freikorps leader, in Stuttgart. While in this capacity, Scherff completed three-year general staff training.

Upon completion of the training in October 1929, Scherff assumed command of 3rd Company of 12th Cavalry Regiment in Grimma, Saxony. He served for one year in this capacity, when he was transferred to the Reichswehrministerium in Berlin. While there, Scherff was promoted to Hauptmann (Captain) in March 1933 and transferred to the Generalstab in October 1935.

In April 1936, Scherff was appointed company commander in 13th Infantry Regiment and was promoted to Major in August that year. He was subsequently transferred to the staff of 21st Infantry Division in Elbing, East Prussia in April 1937 and served as 1st General Staff officer under Generalleutnant Albert Wodrig.

Scherff was ordered back to Berlin in October 1938 and assigned to the Oberkommando des Heeres (OKH - supreme command of the Army) for service with the 7th Department of the Oberquartiermeister (Higher logistics general). He was promoted to Oberstleutnant (Lieutenant colonel) in April 1939.

== World War II ==
Following the outbreak of World War II, Scherff assumed duty as Chief of the 7th Department in OKH and was promoted to Oberst (Colonel) in September 1941. He was transferred to the Oberkommando der Wehrmacht in May 1942 and appointed by Adolf Hitler to compile the history of the war, as the Führer's Commissioner for the Writing of Military History. During his first visit in the office of General Friedrich von Rabenau, the Chief of Army Archive in May 1942, Scherff had an argument with him over the concept of work of Army Archive. An ardent Nazi, Scherff opposed Rabenau's vision to conduct objective research work, pointed that only relevant thing for Archive's work are Hitler's directives and orders.

One month later, Scherff succeeded General Rabenau as Chief of Army Archiv and Rabenau, who was known as a harsh critic of Nazism, was relieved of duties as politically unreliable. Rabenau was later involved in the 20 July Plot and executed in 1945.

As a new Chief for military history, Scherff was tasked with the unified presentation of fight for Greater German Reich and was responsible for determinating, which military literature is suitable to be published and used. For his new assignment, Scherff was promoted to Generalmajor in September 1943 and later received both classes of War Merit Cross with swords for his merits.

He was also present at the Wolf's Lair headquarters in Rastenburg, East Prussia during the 20 July plot and was seriously injured by the bomb. Scherff was burned in the face and both hands and Adolf Hitler later visited him in the hospital. For his wounds, Scherff was decorated personally by Hitler with the Wound Badge of 20 July 1944 as one of the twenty four recipients of this award.

Scherff was responsible for the destruction of parts of the complete stenographic record of Hitler's military conferences despite not having the authority to do so. Those copies under the administration of the Stenographic Service were ordered burned early in May 1945, at his direction. His personal copies were also "probably" burned, according to historians, as "Scherff made it plain that his opinion of Hitler as a general had changed, and he strongly criticized the military strategy of the last few years."

A great admirer of Hitler, he committed suicide by means of a cyanide capsule while in American captivity. Scherff was married to Ella Haas.

== Awards and decorations ==
- Iron Cross (1914), 2nd and 1st Class
  - 2nd Class on 1 June 1917
  - 1st Class on 6 October 1918
- Military Merit Medal (Württemberg) for Bravery in Gold (WMVM1/WgM) on 24 April 1918
- Wound Badge (1918) in Black on 21 December 1918
- Honour Cross of the World War 1914/1918 with Swords on 6 November 1934
- Wehrmacht Long Service Award, 4th to 2nd Class on 2 October 1936
- War Merit Cross (1939), 2nd and 1st Class with Swords
  - 2nd Class on 30 January 1941
  - 1st Class on 20 April 1942
- Wound Badge of 20 July 1944
