= Blau (surname) =

Blau is a German surname meaning "blue". This may have referred to the pale skin, the eyes, or the clothes of the original bearer of the name or the surname may be metonymic, e.g. referring to a dyer or someone who produced bluing in a mill. "Blau" is most commonly an ornamental Jewish (Ashkenazic) surname. Notable people with the surname include:

- Alfred Blau (died 1896), French dramatist and opera librettist
- Amram Blau (1894–1974), Israeli Neturei Karta rabbi
- Dick Blau (born 1943), American photographer and film maker
- Édouard Blau (1836–1906), French dramatist and opera librettist
- Eric Blau (1921–2009), American novelist and dramatist
- Francine D. Blau (born 1946), American economist
- Freda Meissner-Blau (1927–2015), Austrian politician and activist
- Haralds Blaus (1885–1945), Latvian sports shooter
- Harvey R. Blau (1935–2018), American attorney and business executive
- Heinrich Blau (1858–1901), German journalist and playwright
- Helen Blau (born 1948), American biochemist
- Herbert Blau (1926–2013), director and theoretician of performance
- Hermann Blau (1871–1944), German engineer and chemist, and inventor of Blau gas
- Jenő Blau, later Eugene Ormandy (1899–1985), Hungarian-American conductor and violinist
- Joyce Blau (1932–2024), French Kurdologist
- Joseph Leon Blau (1909–1986), American scholar of Jewish history and philosophy
- Joshua Blau (1919–2020), Israeli scholar of Arabic language and literature
- Judith Blau (born 1942), American sociologist
- Justin David Blau (born 1991), American DJ known as 3LAU
- Karl Blau, American musician
- Lajos Bíró (born Blau), (1880–1948), Hungarian novelist, playwright, and screenwriter
- Lajos Blau, Hungarian scholar and publicist
- Leslie Blau, Hungarian author, historian, and survivor of the Holocaust
- Marietta Blau (1894–1970), Austrian physicist
- Max Blau (1918–1984), Swiss chess player
- Peter Blau (1918–2002), Austrian Jewish sociologist
- Rachel Blau DuPlessis (born 1941), American poet and essayist
- Raphael Blau (1912–1996), American screenwriter
- Rolf Blau (born 1952), German football midfielder
- Sarah Blau (born 1973), Israeli author, journalist, playwright, and actress
- Sheridan Blau (born 1939), American literature scholar and potter
- Theodore H. Blau (1928–2003), American clinical and forensic psychologist
- Tina Blau (1845–1916), Austrian landscape painter
- Uri Blau (born 1977), Israeli journalist
- Yaakov Blau (1929–2013), Israeli rabbi
- Yosef Blau, American rabbi

== See also ==
- Blaauw, Dutch surname with the same meaning
