= Blaauw =

Blaauw (Dutch pronunciation: [blʌu]) is a Dutch surname. It is an archaic spelling of modern Dutch blauw, meaning blue. This may have referred to the pale skin, the eyes, or the clothes of the original bearer of the name or the surname may be metonymic, e.g. referring to a dyer or someone who produced bluing in a mill. Notable people with the surname include:

- William Henry Blaauw (1793–1870), English antiquarian and historian
- Jacob Blauw (1759–1829), a lawyer, politician and diplomat
- Henriëtte Blaauw (1875–1949), a writer
- Cornelis Blaauw (1885–1947), an architect
- Siegfried Blaauw (1889–1942), a music teacher and pianist
- Jacobus Roelof Blaauw (1911–1961), an engineer and business manager
- Adriaan Blaauw (1914–2010), Dutch astronomer
  - 2145 Blaauw, his namesake asteroid
- Harm Engbert Blaauw (1918–1945), a resistance fighter
- Harry Blaauw (1923–1943), Dutch merchant navy engineer
- Gerrit Blaauw (1924–2018), Dutch computer engineer and designer
- Jan Blaauw (1928–2020), a policeman and publicist
- Joop de Blaauw (born 1941), a sculptor
- Jan Dirk Blaauw (1941–2020), a politician
- Gjalt Blaauw (born 1945), an artist
- Alexandra Blaauw (born 1962), an actress and producer
- Marco Blaauw (born 1965), Dutch trumpet player
- David Theodore Blaauw (born c.1965), American engineer
- Ron Blaauw (chef) (born 1967), Dutch head chef at an eponymic restaurant and TV-personality
- Marieke Blaauw (born 1971), Dutch animator
- Arjan Blaauw (born 1974), a footballer
- Maarten Blaauw (1974–1999), a comedian and writer
- Wicus Blaauw (born 1986), South African rugby player
- Jacques Blaauw (born 1986), a South African golf professional
- Reinder Berend Blaauw (born 1994), a politician
- Erik Blaauw (born 1997), a handball player
- Gidon Blaauw (born 2008), a Rex player

== See also ==
- Blaeu (disambiguation), variant spelling of the same surname, made famous by the cartographer family Blaeu
- Blau (surname), German surname with the same meaning
