= Ron Blaauw =

Ron Blaauw may refer to:

- Ron Blaauw (chef) (born 1967), businessman, Michelin starred chef and owner of the restaurant Ron Blaauw
- Ron Blaauw (restaurant), Michelin starred restaurant in Amsterdam
