= Blau =

Blau is the German and Catalan word for the color blue. It may refer to:

== Places ==
- Blau (Danube), a tributary of the Danube river in Germany
- Blau Monuments, pair of inscribed stone objects from Mesopotamia

== People ==
- Blau (surname)
- 3lau (pronounced Blau), stagename of DJ Justin Blau (born 1991)

== Art and music ==
- Blau (album), a 2013 Japanese album by Eir Aoi
- Blau, a 1974 album by Conrad Schnitzler

== Other uses ==
- Blau gas, an artificial illuminating gas
- Case Blue (German: Fall Blau), 1942 WWII German summer offensive in southern USSR
- Tramvia Blau, a blue streetcar line in Barcelona, Spain

== See also ==
- Blausee (Blue Lake), a small lake in the Kander valley, Switzerland
- Blautopf, a spring that serves as the source of the river Blau
- Blauw (disambiguation)
- Blaw (disambiguation)
- Blue (disambiguation)
