= Buoyancy compensator =

Buoyancy compensator may refer to:

- Buoyancy compensator (diving)
- Buoyancy compensator (aviation)
