= Samuel Löw Brill =

Hungarian rabbi

Samuel Löw Brill (September 14, 1814 – April 8, 1897) was a Hungarian rabbi and Talmudical scholar born in Budapest.

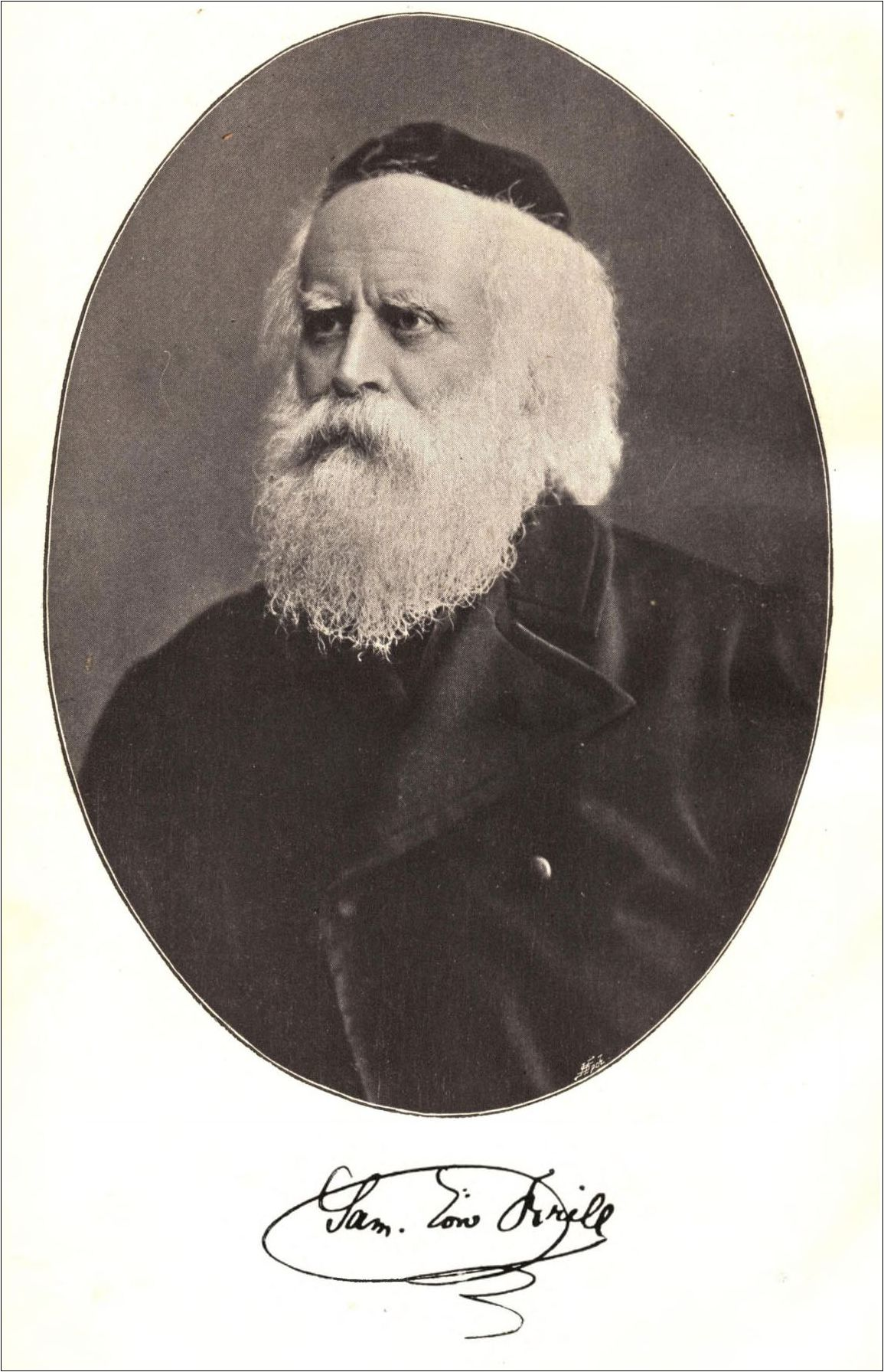

He was educated by his father, Azriel Brill (1778-1853), who was teacher and associate rabbi at Pest, Hungary, and the author of several works in the Hebrew language. After having been carefully grounded at home in Hebrew studies, and graduating with honors from the Protestant Lyceum of his native city, he attended the Talmud schools at Eisenstadt (1832) [under M. J. Perls], Pressburg (1834–35) [under Moses Sofer], and Prague (1836), where he obtained, at the age of twenty-two, his rabbinical degree. In 1842-43 he was registered in the University of Berlin, where he attended the courses of famous teachers, such as Boeckh, the classical philologist, Ritter, the geographer, Leopold Ranke, the historian, Schelling, and others, and associated with Leopold Zunz and Michael Sachs.

Returning to his native city, he was appointed assistant rabbi in 1843, and associate rabbi in 1850. Although he did not come before the public at large either in print (his only publication was an anonymous necrology of his teacher Moses Sofer, in the Allg. Zeit. des Judenthums, 1838) or on the platform, he soon became widely known by his Talmudic lectures, which he enlivened with material drawn from Hebrew and general literature. Among his earliest pupils were W. Bacher and I. Goldziher.

Brill was highly esteemed not only by his coreligionists, but also by the Hungarian government, and was its first counselor when it was preparing to institute a rabbinical seminary (see Moritz Bloch Ballagi). He was also one of the founders of the Budapest University of Jewish Studies (Landesrabbinerschule), inaugurated in 1877, in which institution he held the position of teacher of Talmud from 1877 till 1887, having previously (since 1872) been president of the rabbinical college of Budapest. He also took part in the Israelitic county-congress of 1868-69. During Brill's lifetime a number of subtle extracts from his Talmudic glosses were published in the Monatsschrift, 1896-97, and the Magyar Zsidó Szemle, of the same years, by Ludwig Blau. A few sermons have also been printed in the last-named periodical.

Brill's valuable Hebrew library became the property of the seminary at Budapest.

== Jewish Encyclopedia bibliography ==
- L. Blau, Samuel Löw Brill: His Life and Character, in Hungarian, with portrait, Budapest, 1902.
