= Aan de Poel =

Coordinates: 52°17′59.4″N 4°50′41.38″E

- Interactive map of Aan de Poel

Restaurant information
- Established: 2007
- Head chef: Stefan van Sprang
- Food type: Regional, International, French
- Rating: Michelin Guide
- Location: Handweg 1, Amstelveen, 1185 TS, Netherlands
- Seating capacity: 70
- Website: Official website

Aan de Poel is a fine-dining restaurant in Amstelveen, Netherlands that was awarded one Michelin star for the period 2009–2012. Since 2013, it carries two Michelin stars.

In 2013, GaultMillau awarded the restaurant 16 out of 20 points.

Head chef of Aan de Poel is Stefan van Sprang. Before starting their own restaurant, Sprang and his sommelier Robbert Jan Veuger have worked together at restaurant Ron Blaauw.

The restaurant joined the Alliance Gastronomique Néerlandaise in 2012.

Aan de Poel is located on the shore of lake De Poel.

== See also ==
- List of Michelin starred restaurants in the Netherlands
