= Blaw =

Blaw, BLAW, or Blaws may refer to:

== People ==
- Blaw family, the original holders of the title Laird of Burnbrae
- Jacob B. Blaw, founder of Blaw, predecessor to Blaw-Knox
- Anne Blaws, wife of John Hartwell Cocke

=== Fictional characters ===
- Lillet Blaw, a character from GrimGrimoire
- Walter Blaws, a character from The Saga of Darren Shan; see List of The Saga of Darren Shan characters

== Other uses ==
- Bachelor of Laws (B.Law, B.Laws, or, LL.B), an undergraduate university degree
- Bloomberg Law (BLAW), an online law research tool
- Blaw Collapsible Steel Centering Company, predecessor of Blaw-Knox

== See also ==
- Blaw-Knox, a construction equipment manufacturer
- Blaw-Knox tower, a type of radio tower constructed by Blaw-Knox company
- Blau (disambiguation)
- Blauw (disambiguation)
- Blow (disambiguation)
