= Jewish material culture =

Jewish material culture has as much variety as the cultures that Jews have taken part in all over the world. Many aspects of the material culture of Jews is shared, such as the ikat fabrics of Bukharan Jews that are dyed in patterns often corresponding to regions rather than ethnicity. Some local textiles and crafts find use in the creation of religious items like torah ark curtains or robes used in Jewish traditions and ceremonies like bar mitzvah, blending the Jewish aspects of culture with the local traditions.

== Background ==
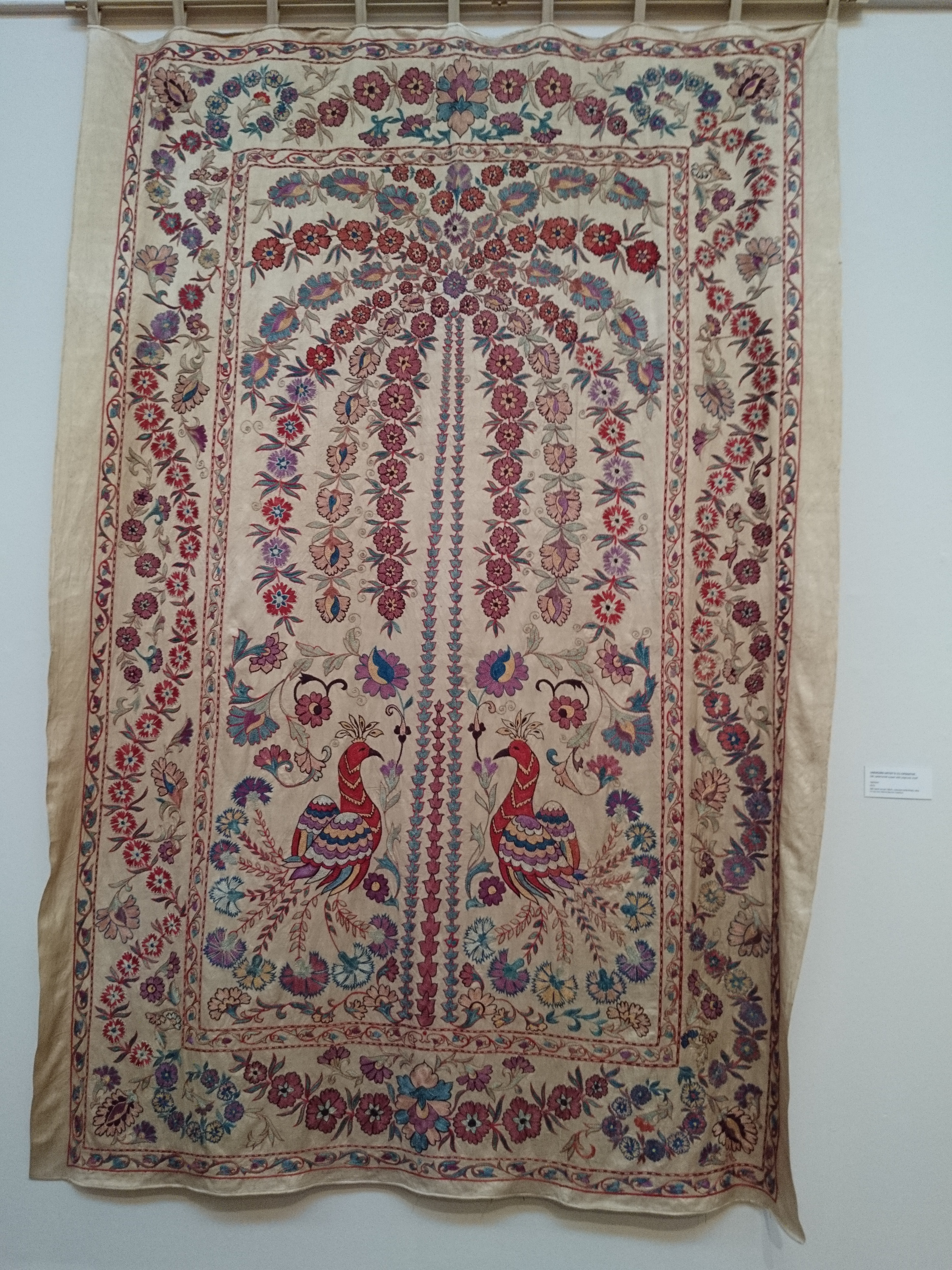
The traditional Torah ark curtains of Jewish communities in Central Asia were hand embroidered suzani

Most studies of Jewish history and daily life in historic times have focused on text sources like the Talmud, which gives an incomplete understanding of practices in the daily lives of Jews, and contains some content understood to be theoretical. The material culture of Jewish communities was initially overlooked as an area of study. Work in 2007 has begun to explore the "questions of transformation of Jewish culture through consumption and material culture". The idea of studying material artifacts to shed light on Jewish communities is credited to Lajos Blau (d. 1936 who took as an example similar studies in the area of Christian antiquity.

In the study of material culture, clothing and textiles are evaluated for their ability to tell us about gender, ethnicity, social class, and religion.

== Uzbekistan ==
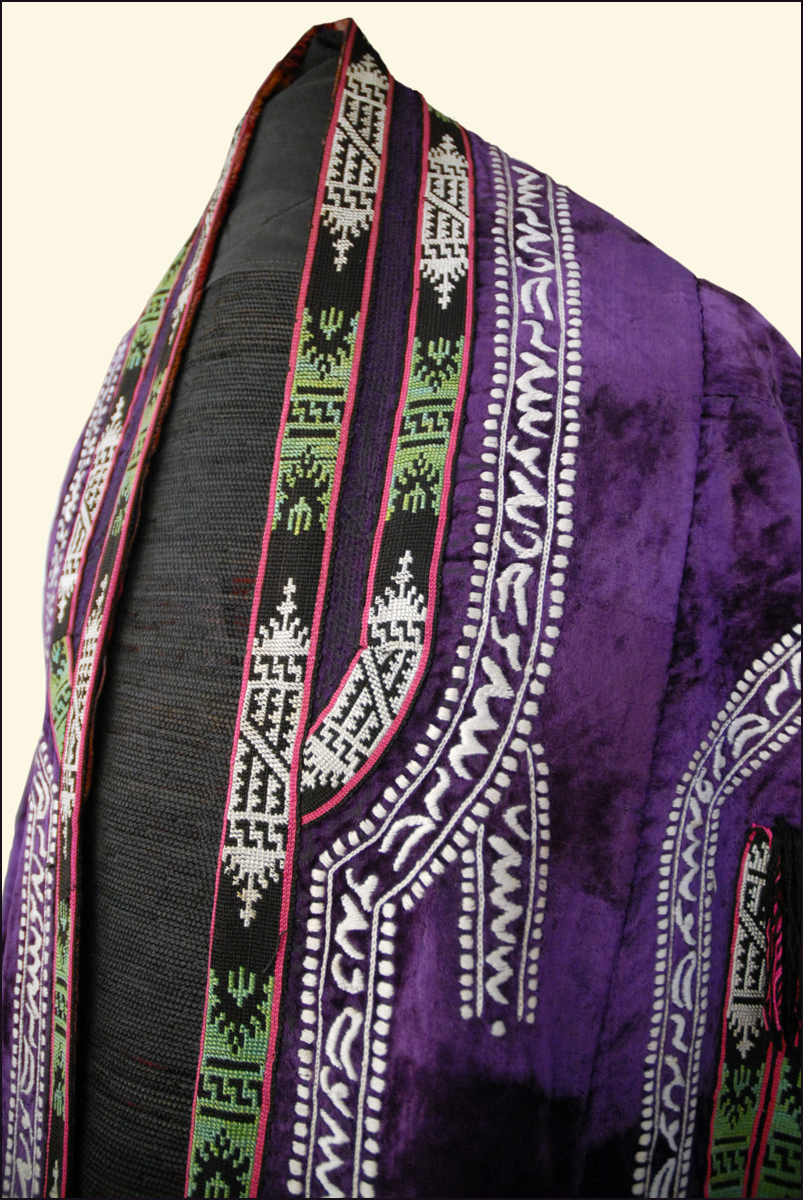
Women's robe called paranja hand embroidered in silk thread on velvet, early 20th century

Museum collections of Bukharan Jewish clothes include sequined wedding shawls, khalat robes (worn for the bar mitzvah), suzani torah ark curtains and ikat dyed pieces. Most of the ikat patterns reflected the city of origin rather than the ethnicity of the wearer. One notable example from the collection of the Israel Museum is a 19th century women's brocade silk coat lined with ikat silk.

The material culture of Bukharan Jews dates in large part to the late 19th and early 20th centuries as this was a time of great prosperity for them in which they built magnificent houses in Bukhara, Samarkand, Kokand and Tashkent. The traditional Jewish Houses have been listed as a World Heritage Site since 1993. Since 2020 efforts are underway to develop conservation strategies to preserve the vernacular architecture of the houses, located on narrow streets of medieval mahalla (neighborhoods), as the city undergoes modernization and urban development.

Jews were known for their skilled work dyeing and weaving textiles, especially Cashmere wool and silks. Henry Lansdell described a scene from a bazaar in Tashkent. The silk threads he purchased from the Jewish merchants there are today in the collection of the British Museum: "We purchased pocket handkerchiefs and skeins of native silk, the latter very glossy, and dyed and sold largely by the Jews, who from the numbers we saw in the bazaar, and their begrimed appearance, gave one the idea that they engage a good deal in handicrafts, especially dyeing."
