= Military aircraft =

Aircraft designed or utilized for use in or support of military operations

Military aircraft
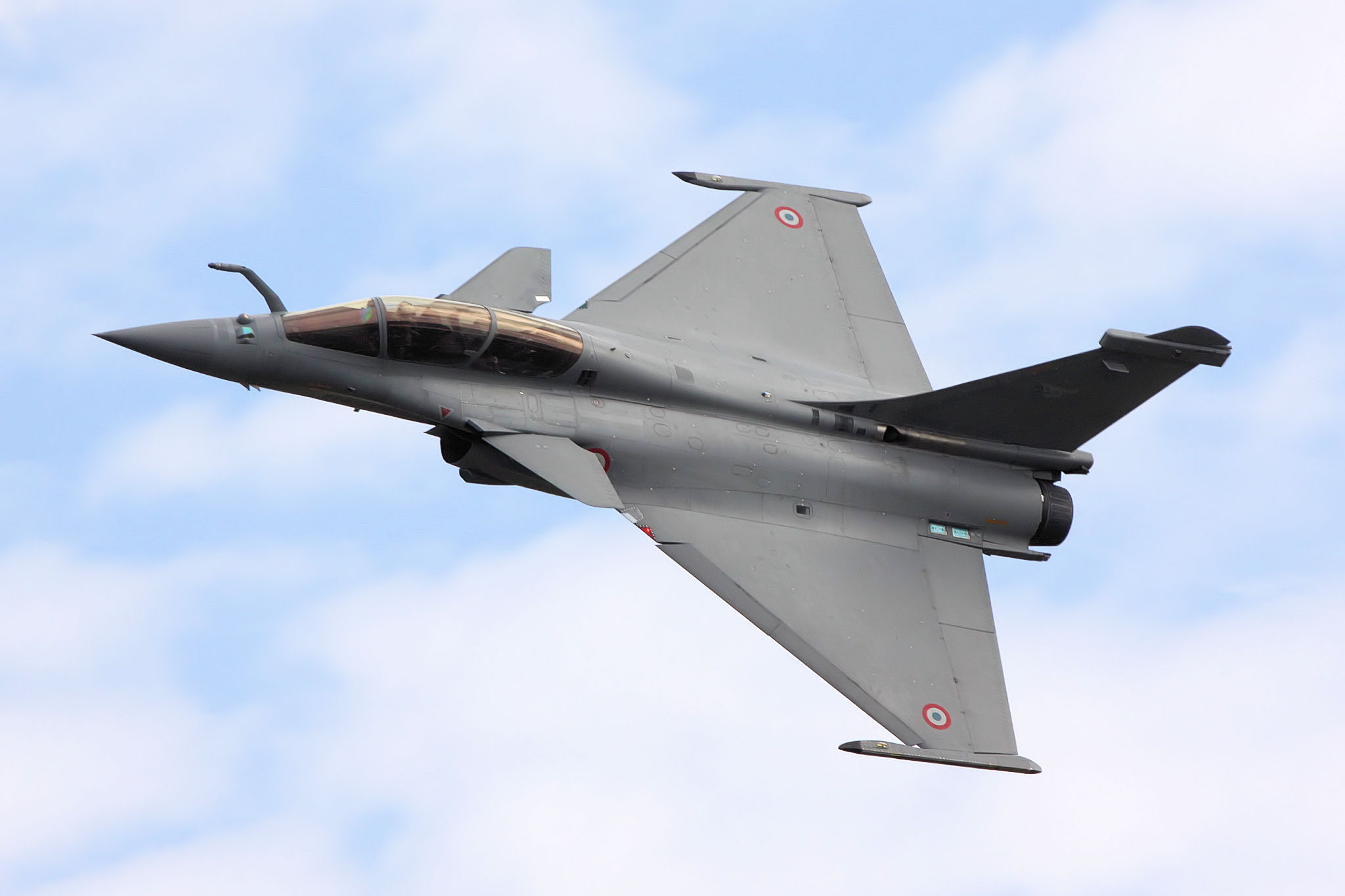
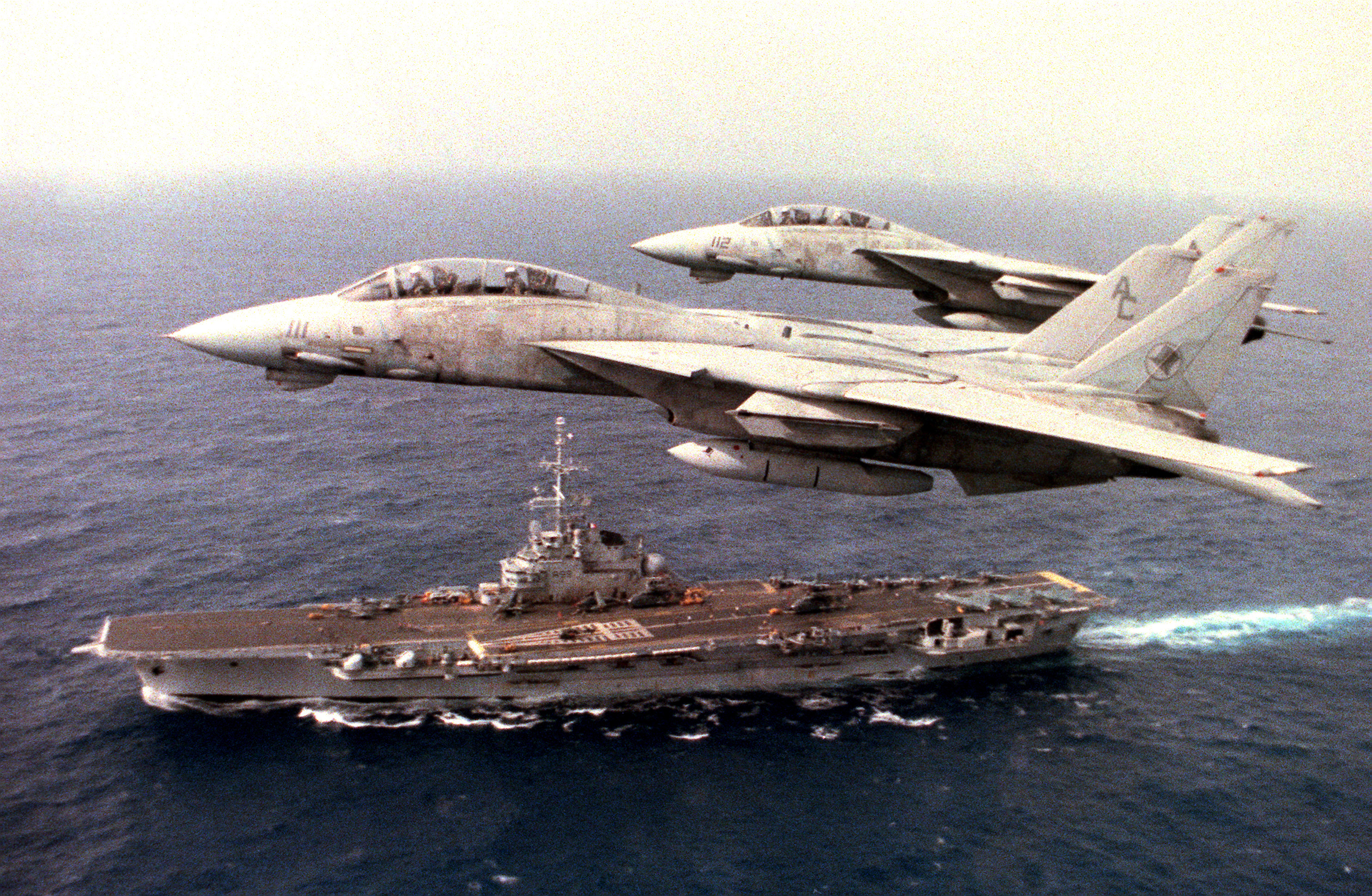
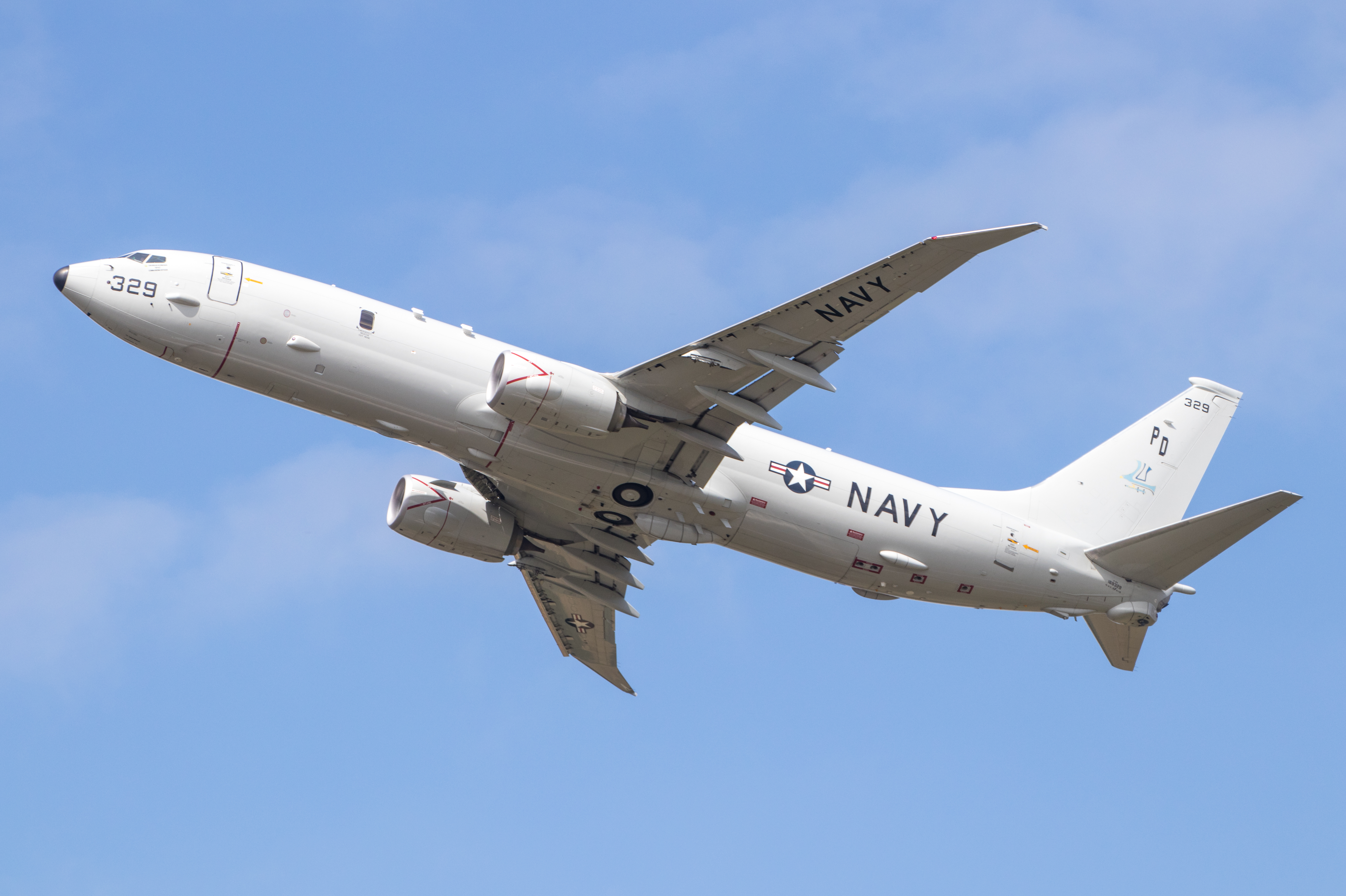
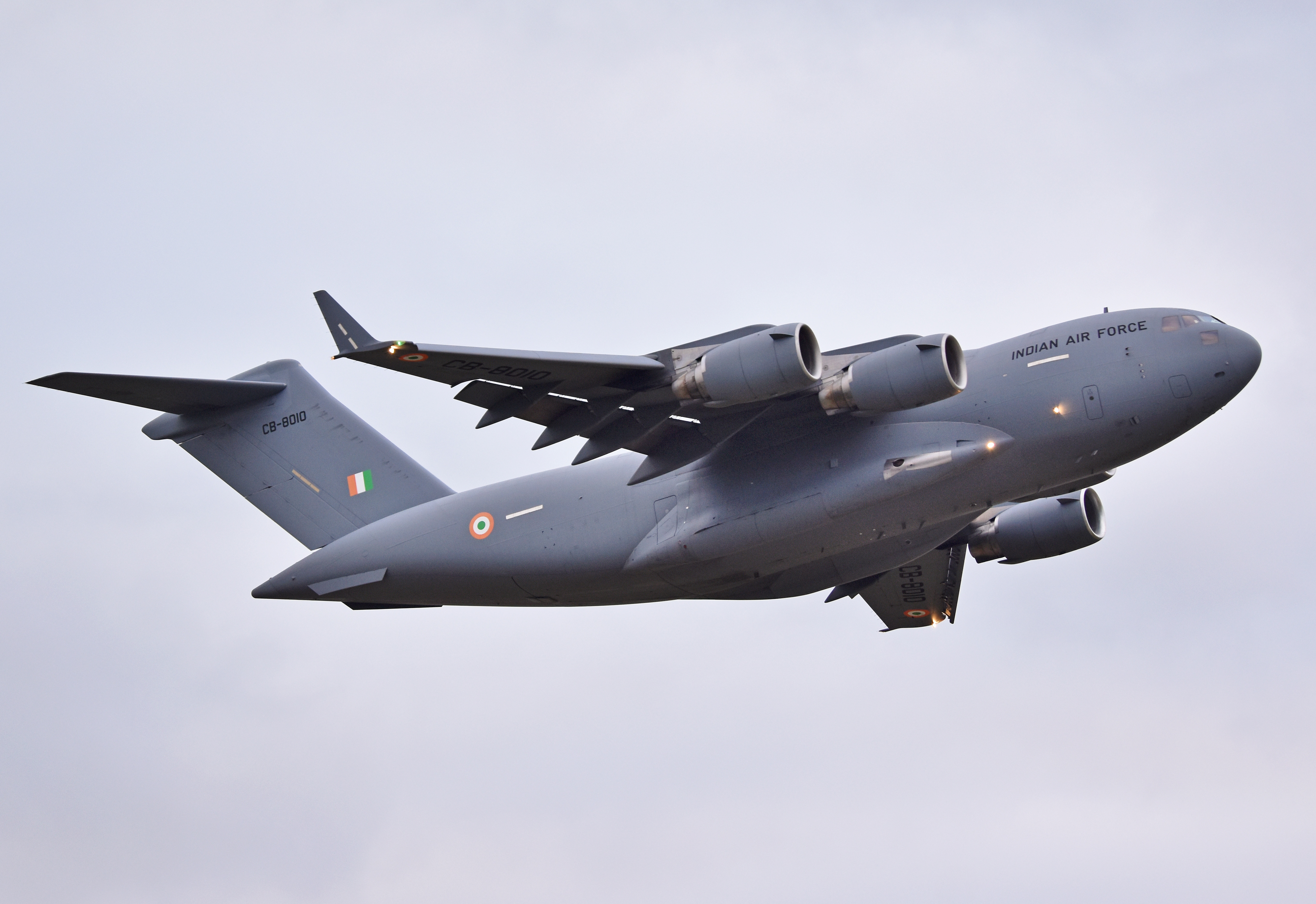
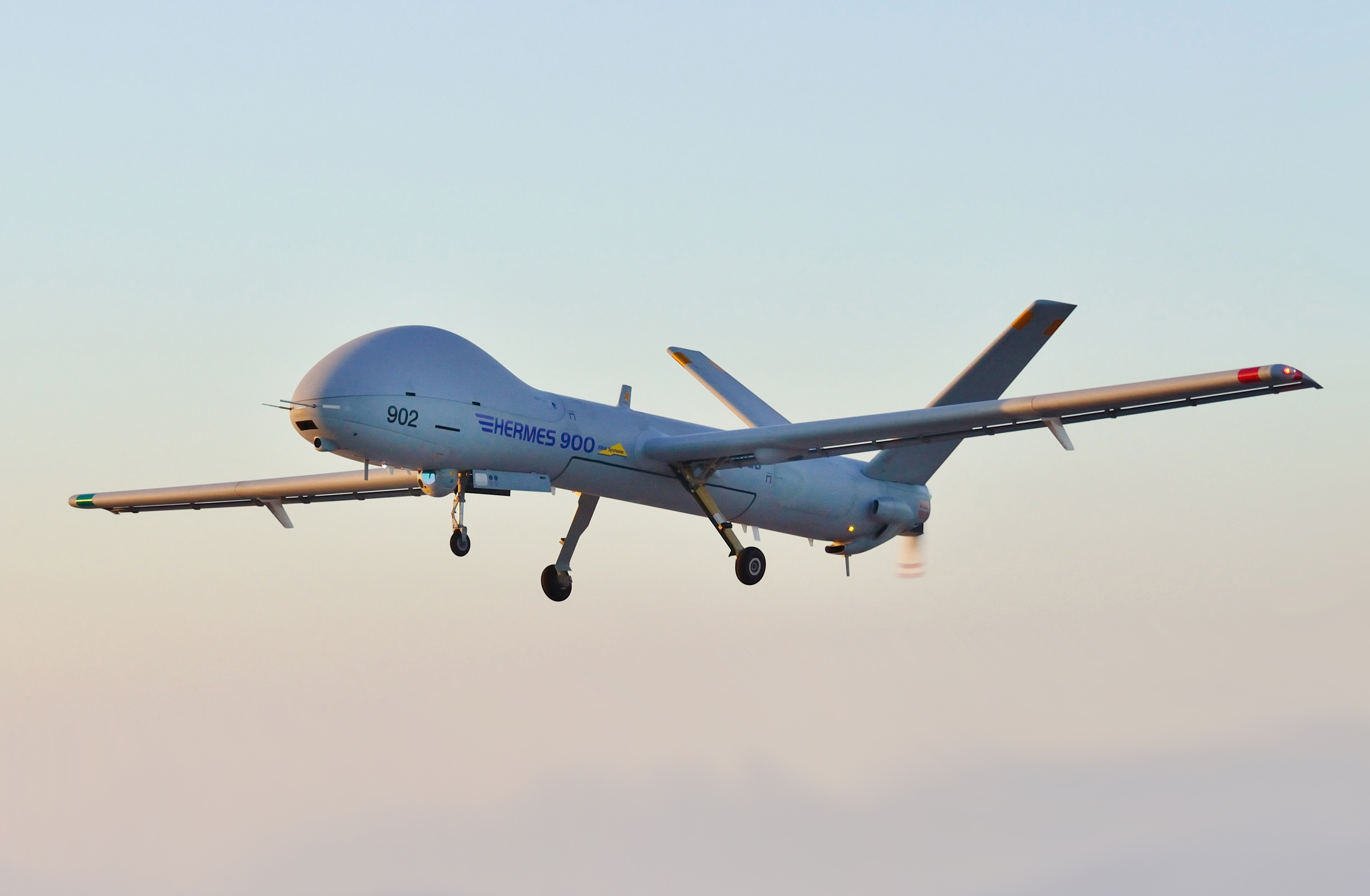
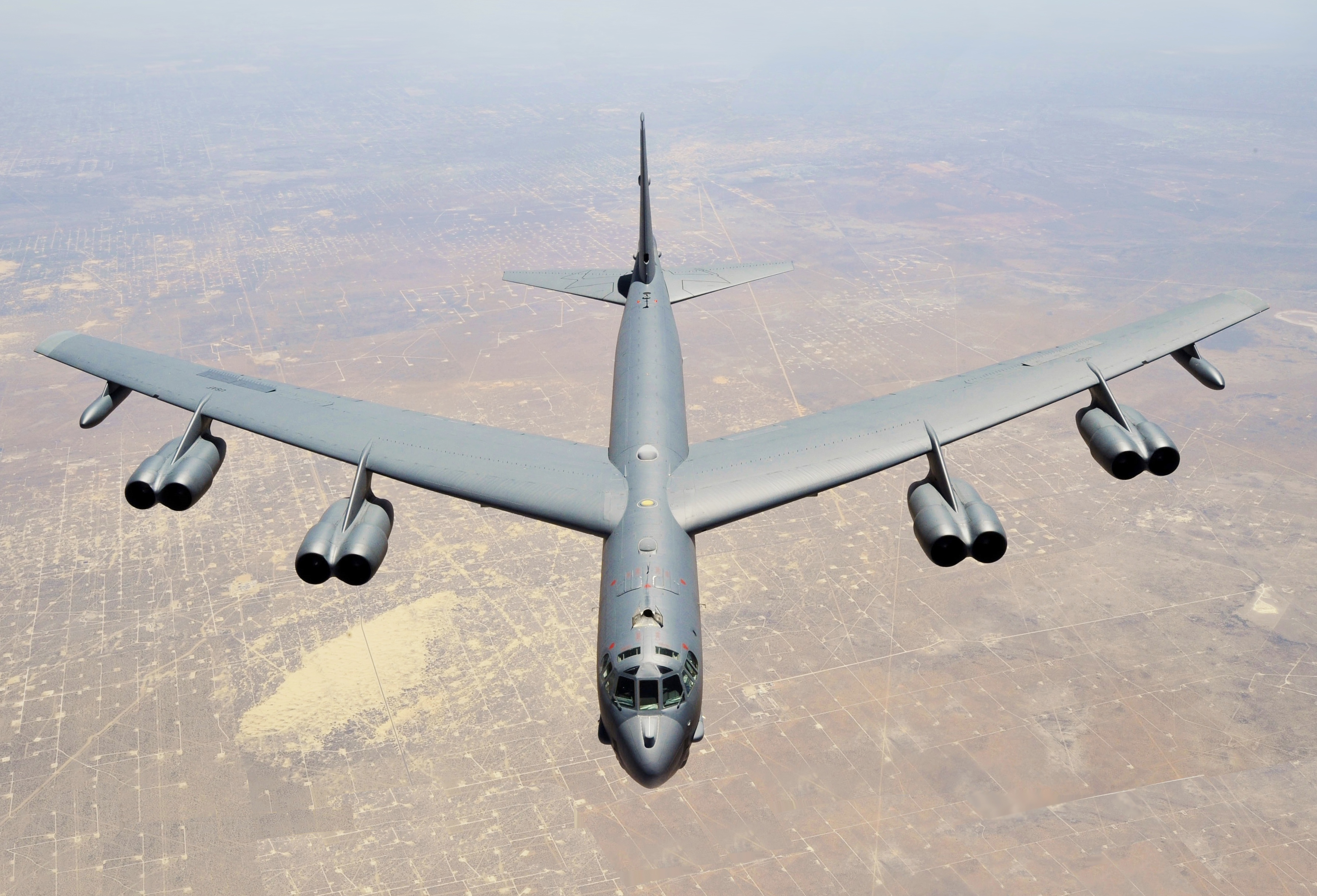
Various military aircraft; Top left to right:
1. Dassault Rafale (multirole fighter)
2. Grumman F-14 Tomcat (fighter)
3. Boeing P-8 (maritime patrol)
4. Boeing C-17 (strategic airlifter)
5. Elbit Hermes 900 (UAV)
6. Boeing B-52 (bomber)

A military aircraft is any fixed-wing or rotary-wing aircraft that is operated by a legal or insurrectionary military of any type. Some military aircraft engage directly in aerial warfare, while others take on support roles:

- Combat aircraft, such as fighters and bombers, are designed to destroy enemy equipment or personnel using their own ordnance. Combat aircraft are typically developed and procured only by military forces.
- Non-combat aircraft, such as transports and tankers, are not designed for combat as their primary function but may carry weapons for self-defense. These mainly operate in support roles, and may be developed by either military forces or civilian organizations.

== History ==
=== Lighter-than-air ===
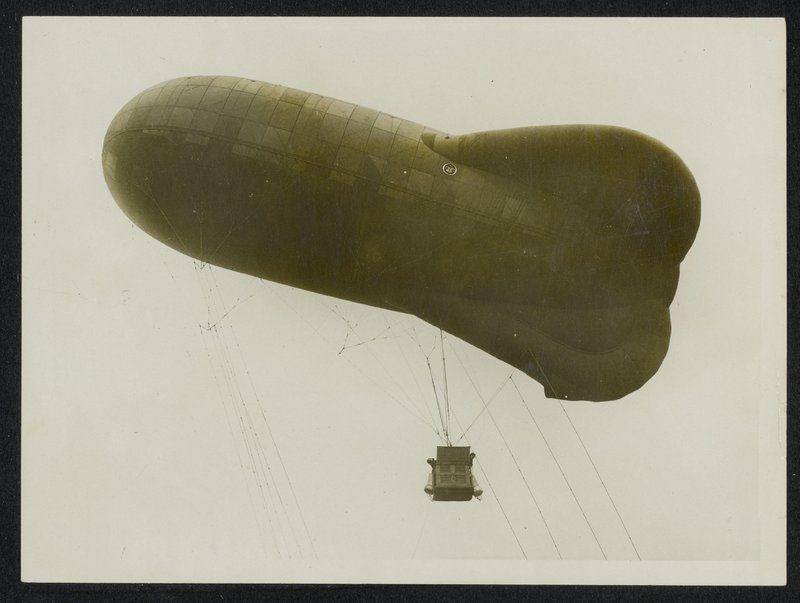
Luchtballon WO I observation balloon

In 1783, when the first practical aircraft (hot-air and hydrogen balloons) were established, they were quickly adopted for military duties. The first military balloon unit was the French Aerostatic Corps, who in 1794 flew an observation balloon during the Battle of Fleurus, the first major battle to feature aerial observation. Balloons continued to be used throughout the 19th century, including in the Napoleonic Wars and the Franco-Prussian War, for observation and propaganda distribution. During World War I, German Zeppelin airships carried out multiple air raids on British cities, as well as being used for observation. In the 1920s, the U.S. Navy acquired several non-rigid airships, the first one to see service being the K-1 in 1931. Use by the U.S. as well as other countries continued into World War II. The U.S. Navy retired its last balloons in 1963. Only a handful of lighter-than-air military aircraft were used since, such as the American Blimp MZ-3, used for research and development by the U.S. Navy from 2006 to 2017.

=== Heavier-than-air ===
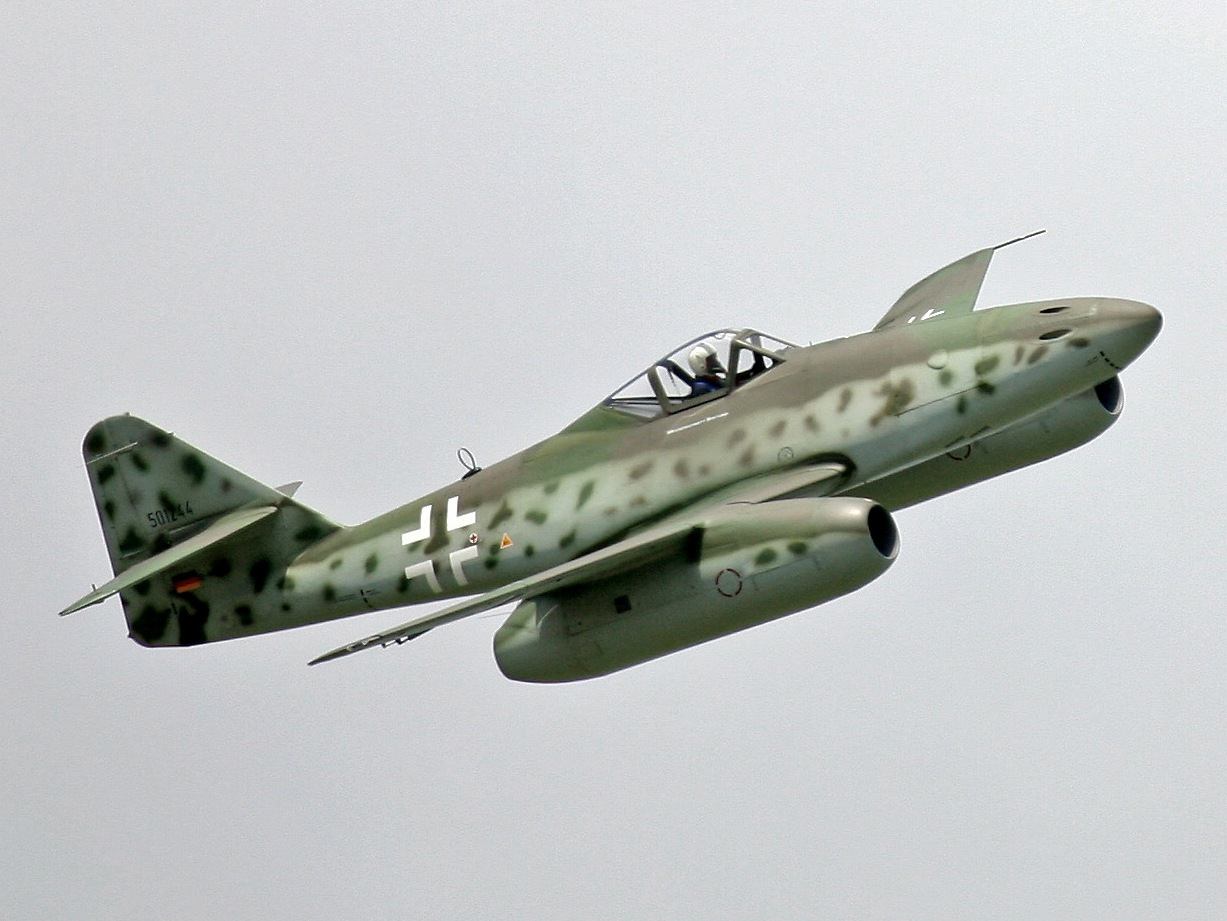
A replica of Messerschmitt Me 262, one of the first turbojet-powered combat aircraft

Soon after the first flight of the Wright Flyer, several militaries became interested in powered aircraft. In 1909 the United States Army purchased the Wright Military Flyer, a two-seat observation aircraft, for the Aeronautical Division, U.S. Signal Corps. It served until 1911, by which time powered aircraft had become an important feature in several armies around the world. Airplanes performed aerial reconnaissance and tactical bombing missions in the Italo-Turkish War, and the First Balkan War saw the first naval-air operations. Photoreconnaissance and propaganda leaflet drops followed in the Second Balkan War.

Air combat was a notable component of World War I, as fighter aircraft were developed during the war, long-range strategic bombing became a possibility, and airplanes were deployed from aircraft carriers. Airplanes also took on a greater variety of support roles, notably medical evacuation, and deployed new weapons like air-to-air rockets for use against reconnaissance balloons. Aviation technology advanced rapidly in the interwar period, and military aircraft became increasingly capable. Autogyros and helicopters were also developed at this time. During World War II, military aviation reached new heights. Decisive air battles influenced the outcome of the war, early jet aircraft flew combat missions, cruise missiles and ballistic missiles were deployed for the first time, airborne troops and cargo parachuted into battle, and the nuclear weapons that ended the war were delivered by air.

In the Cold War era, aviation technology continued to advance at an extremely rapid pace. Jet aircraft exceeded Mach 1 and Mach 2, armament focus switched mainly to missiles, aircraft began carrying more sophisticated avionics, air-to-air refueling matured into practicality, and transport aircraft grew in size. Stealth aircraft entered development during the 1970s and saw combat in the 1980s.

== Combat ==
Combat aircraft, or "warplanes", are divided broadly into fighters, bombers, attackers, electronic warfare, maritime, multirole, and unmanned aircraft. Variations exist between them, including fighter-bombers, such as the MiG-23 ground-attack aircraft and the Soviet Ilyushin Il-2. Also included among combat aircraft are long-range maritime patrol aircraft, such as the Hawker Siddeley Nimrod and the S-3 Viking that are often equipped to attack with anti-ship missiles and anti-submarine weapons.

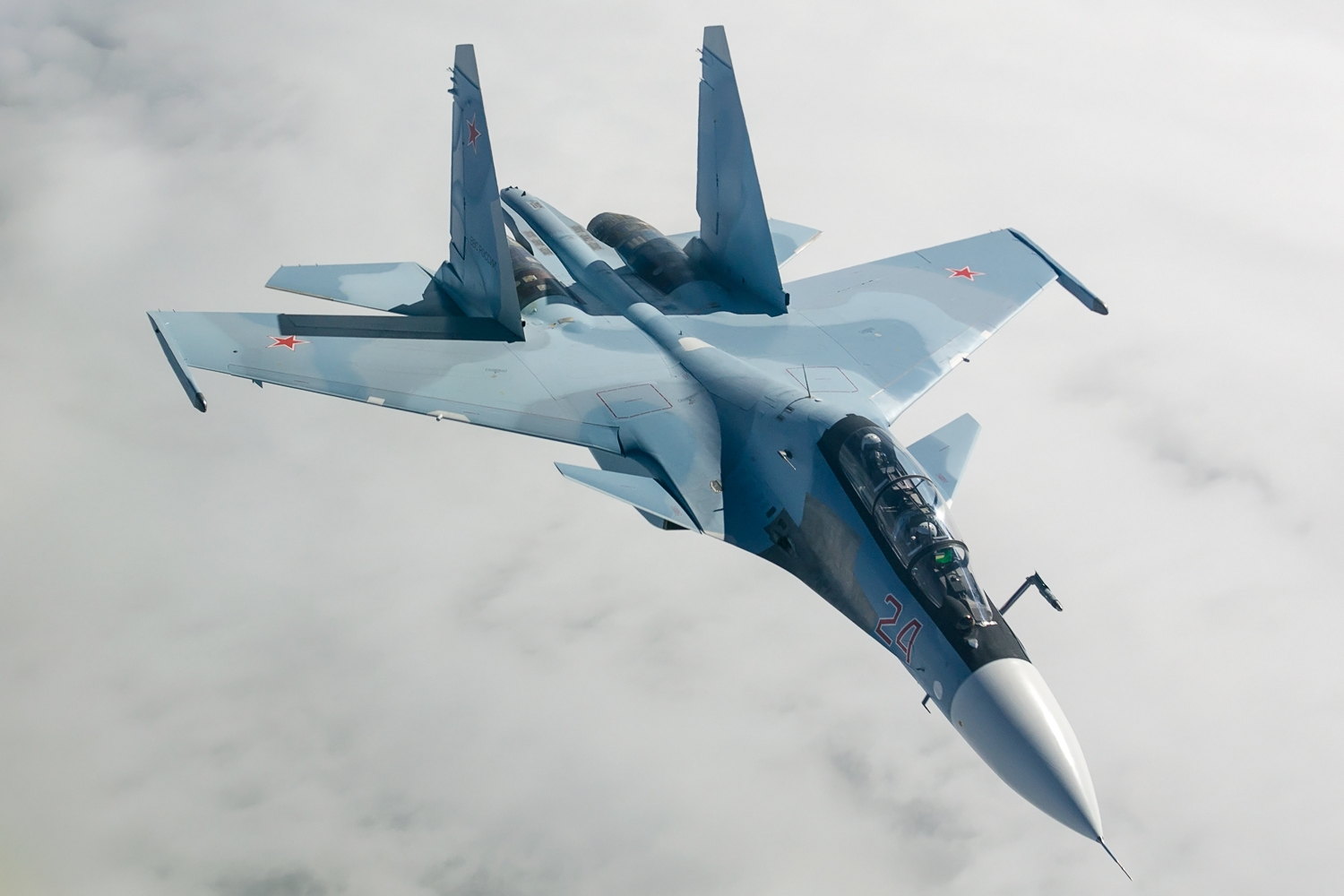
Sukhoi Su-30 fighter aircraft

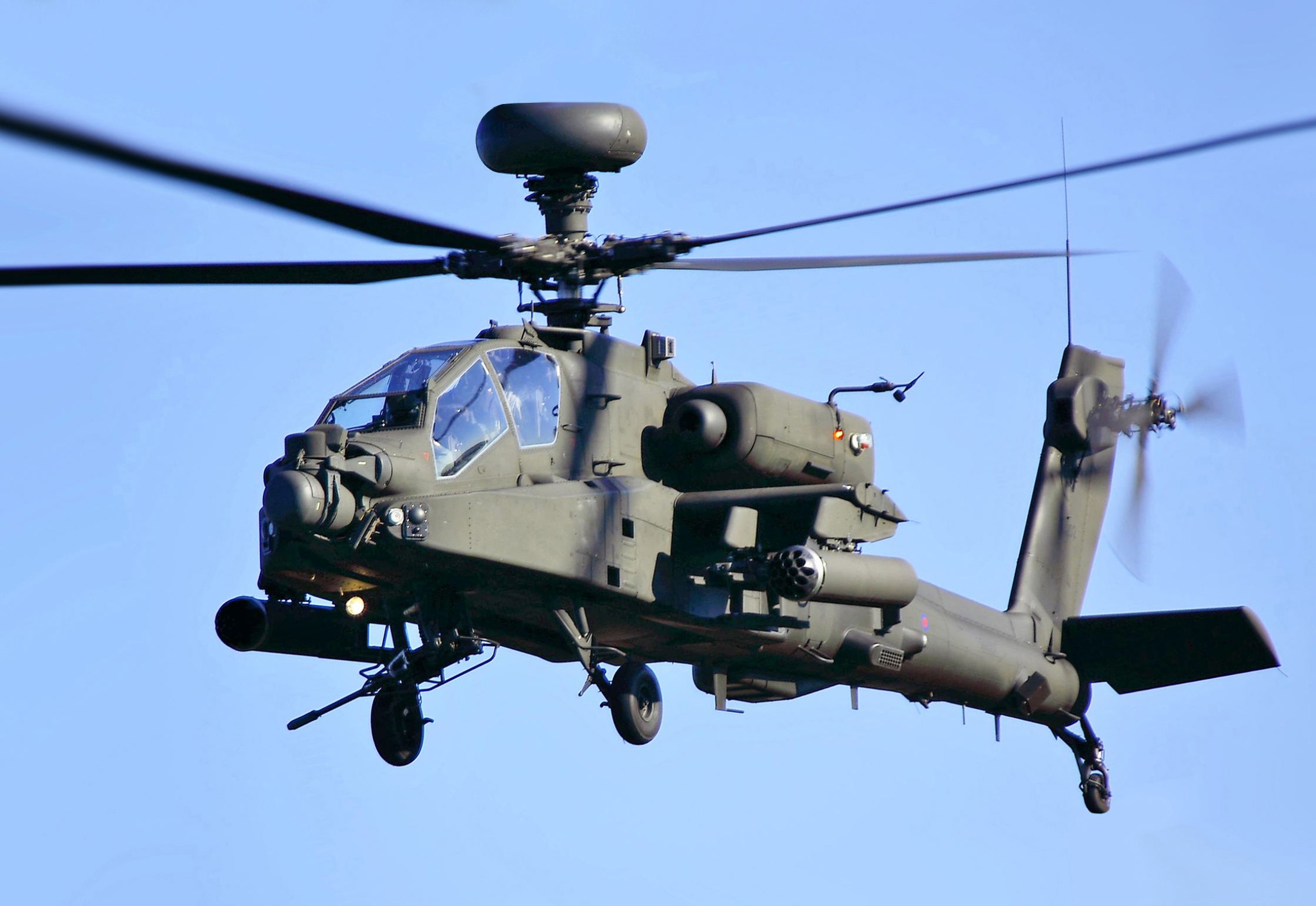
AW Apache attack helicopter

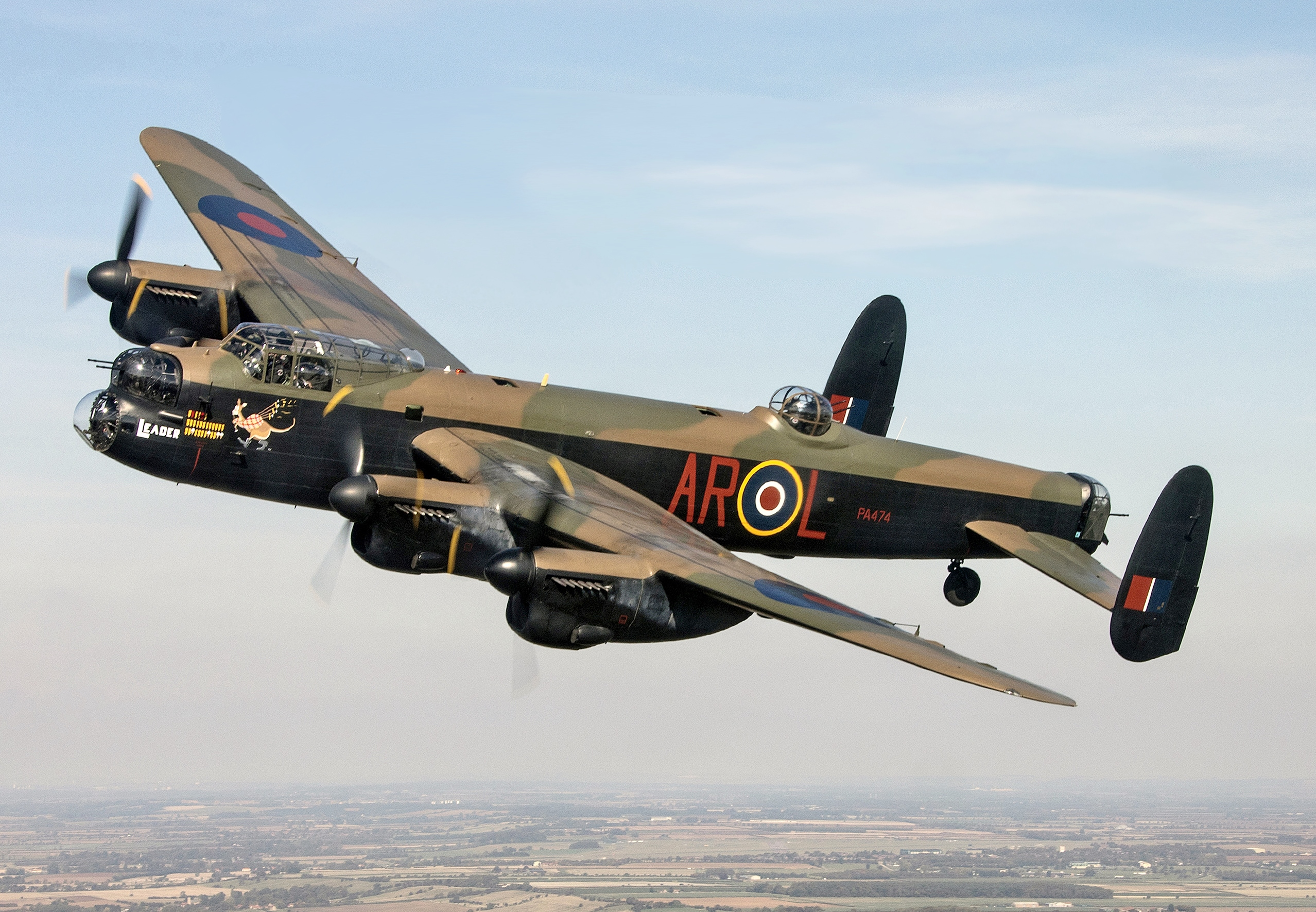
Avro Lancaster bomber

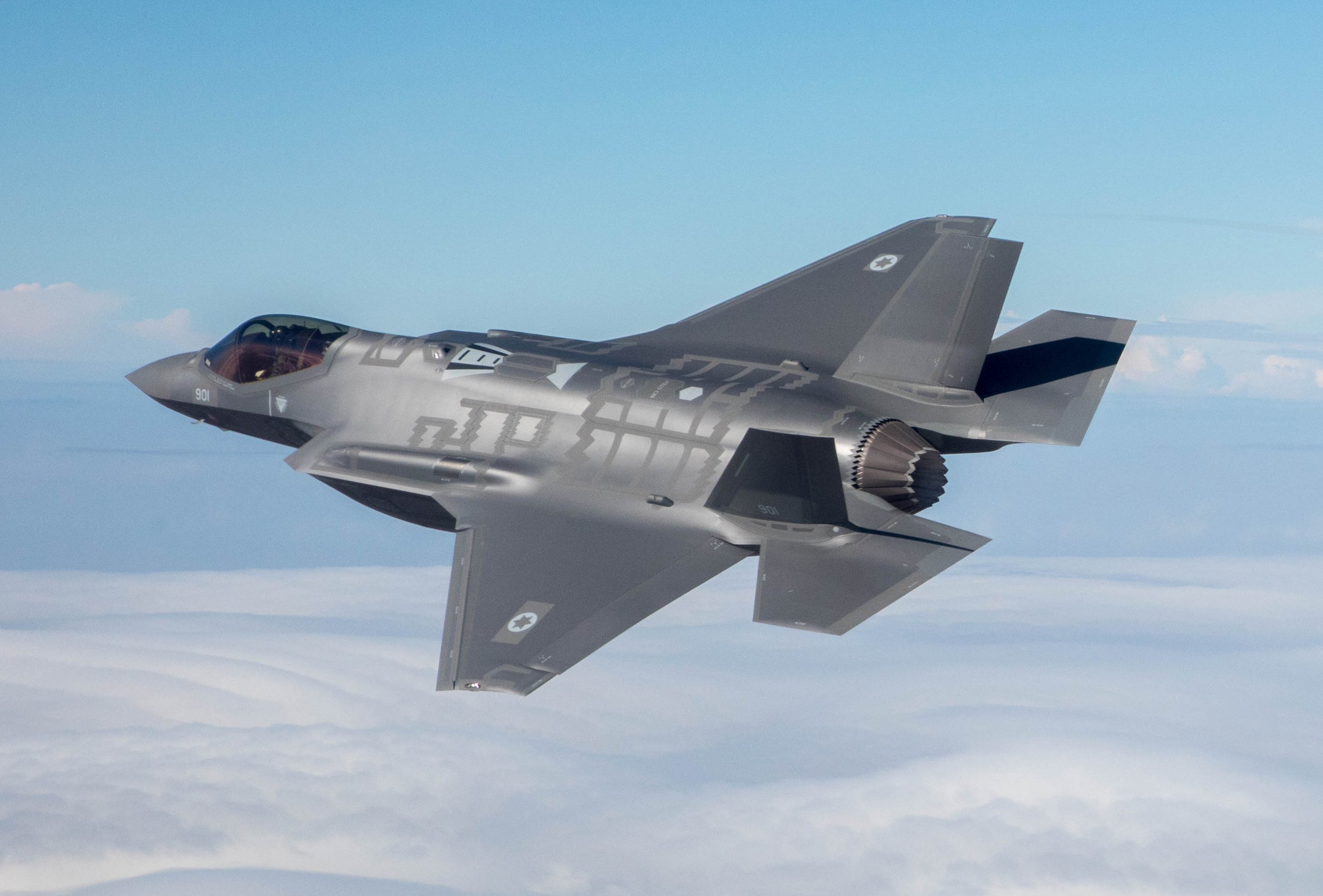
LM F-35 multirole combat aircraft

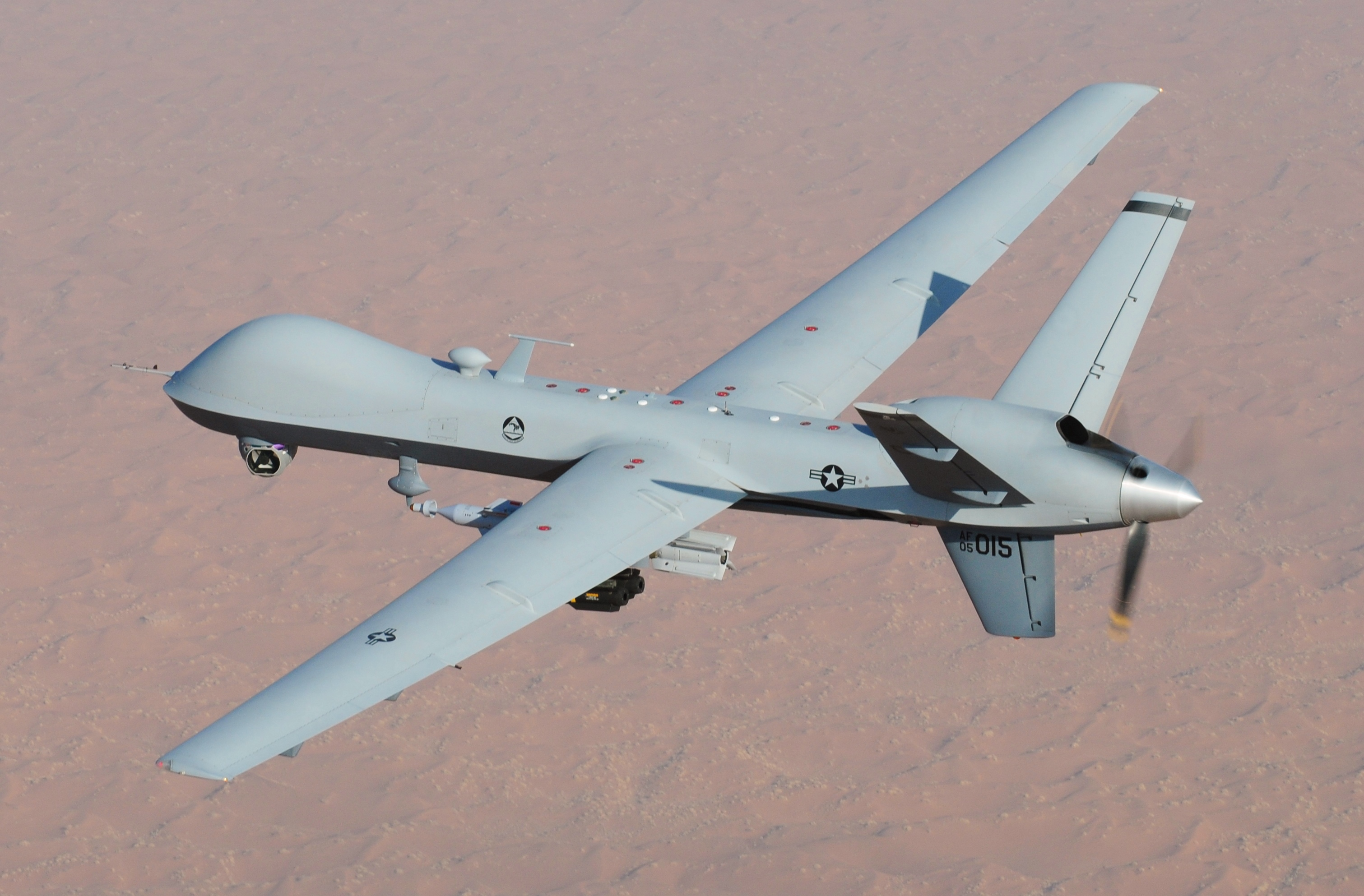
General Atomics MQ-9 Reaper UCAV

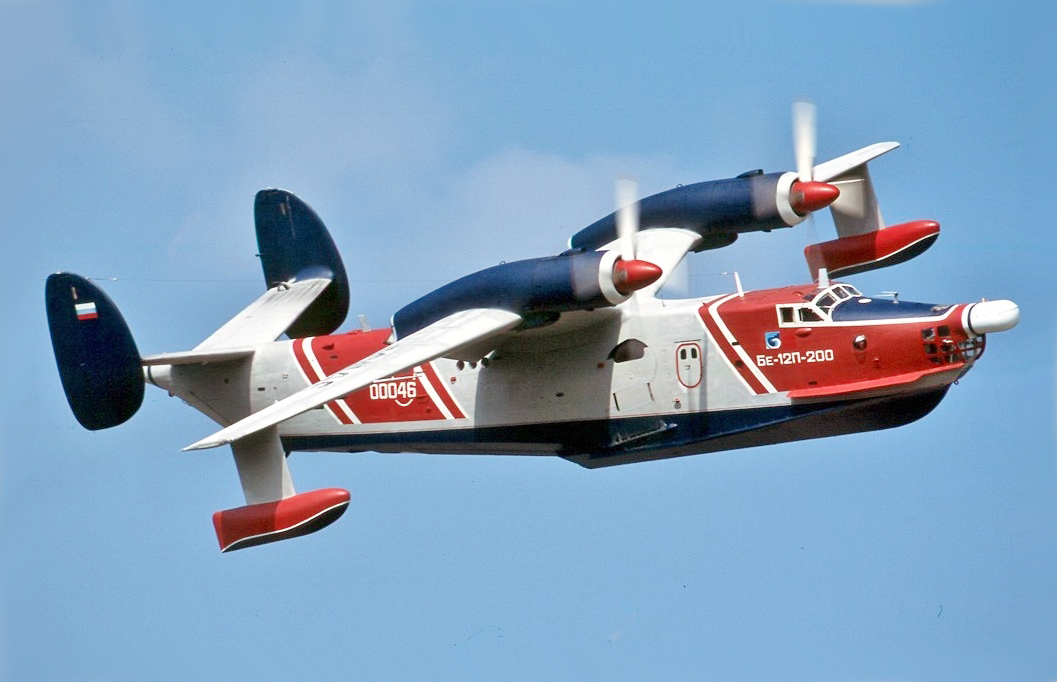
Beriev Be-12 maritime patrol aircraft

=== Fighters ===
The primary role of fighters is destroying enemy aircraft in air-to-air combat, as part of both offensive and defensive counter air operations. Many fighters also possess a degree of ground attack capability, allowing them to perform surface attack and close air support missions. In addition to their counter air duties they are tasked to perform escort mission for bombers or other aircraft. Fighters are capable of carrying a variety of weapons, including machine guns, autocannons, rockets, guided missiles, and bombs. Many modern fighters can attack enemy fighters from a great distance, before the enemy even sees or detects them. Examples of such fighters include the F-35 Lightning II, F-22 Raptor, F-15 Eagle, and Su-27.

=== Attack aircraft ===
Attack aircraft can be used to provide support for friendly ground troops. Some are able to carry conventional or nuclear weapons far behind enemy lines to strike priority ground targets. Attack helicopters attack enemy armor and provide close air support for ground troops. An example of a historical ground-attack aircraft is the Soviet Ilyushin Il-2. Several types of transport airplanes have been armed with sideways firing weapons as gunships for ground attack. These include the AC-47 and AC-130 gunships.

=== Bombers ===
Bombers are normally larger, heavier, and less maneuverable than fighter aircraft. They are capable of carrying large payloads of bombs, torpedoes or cruise missiles. Bombers are used almost exclusively for ground attacks and are not fast or agile enough to take on enemy fighters head-to-head. Some have a single engine and require one pilot to operate, while others have two or more engines and require crews of two or more. A limited number of bombers, such as the B-2 Spirit, have stealth capabilities that keep them from being detected by enemy radar. An example of a conventional modern bomber would be the B-52 Stratofortress. An example of a World War II bomber would be a B-17 Flying Fortress. An example of a World War I bomber would be a Handley Page O/400. Bombers include light bombers, medium bombers, heavy bombers, dive bombers, and torpedo bombers.

=== Multirole ===
Many combat aircraft in the modern day have multirole capabilities. Normally only applied to fixed-wing aircraft, the term signifies the ability to transition between air-to-air and air-to-ground roles, sometimes even during the same mission. An example of a multirole design is the F-15E Strike Eagle, Eurofighter Typhoon, Dassault Rafale and Panavia Tornado. A World War II example would be the P-38 Lightning. A utility helicopter could also count as a multirole aircraft and can fill roles such as close-air support, air assault, military logistics, CASEVAC, medical evacuation, command and control, and troop transport.

=== Unmanned ===
Unmanned combat aerial vehicles (UCAV) have no crew, but are controlled by a remote operator. They may have varying degrees of autonomy. UCAVs are often armed with bombs, air-to-surface missiles, or other aircraft ordnance. Their uses typically include targeted killings, precision airstrikes, and air interdictions, as well as other forms of drone warfare.

=== Electronic warfare ===
An electronic warfare aircraft is a military aircraft equipped for electronic warfare, i.e. degrading the effectiveness of enemy radar and radio systems. They are generally modified versions of other preexisting aircraft. A recent example would be the EA-18G Growler, which is a modified version of the F/A-18F Super Hornet.

=== Patrol ===
A maritime patrol aircraft is a fixed-wing military aircraft designed to operate for long durations over water in maritime patrol roles—in particular anti-submarine, anti-ship, and search and rescue. Some patrol aircraft were designed for this purpose, like the Kawasaki P-1. Many others are modified designs of pre-existing aircraft, such as the Boeing P-8 Poseidon, which is based on the Boeing 737-800 airliner. While the term maritime patrol aircraft generally refers to fixed wing aircraft, other aircraft types, such as blimps and helicopters, have also been used in the same roles.

== Non-combat ==
Non-combat roles of military aircraft include search and rescue, reconnaissance, observation/surveillance, Airborne Early Warning and Control, transport, training, and aerial refueling.

Many civil aircraft, both fixed wing and rotary wing, have been produced in separate models for military use, such as the civilian Douglas DC-3 airliner, which became the military C-47 Skytrain, and British "Dakota" transport planes, and decades later, the USAF's AC-47 Spooky gunships. Even the fabric-covered two-seat Piper J-3 Cub had a military version. Gliders and balloons have also been used as military aircraft; for example, balloons were used for observation during the American Civil War and during World War I, and military gliders were used during World War II to deliver ground troops in airborne assaults.

=== Military transport ===
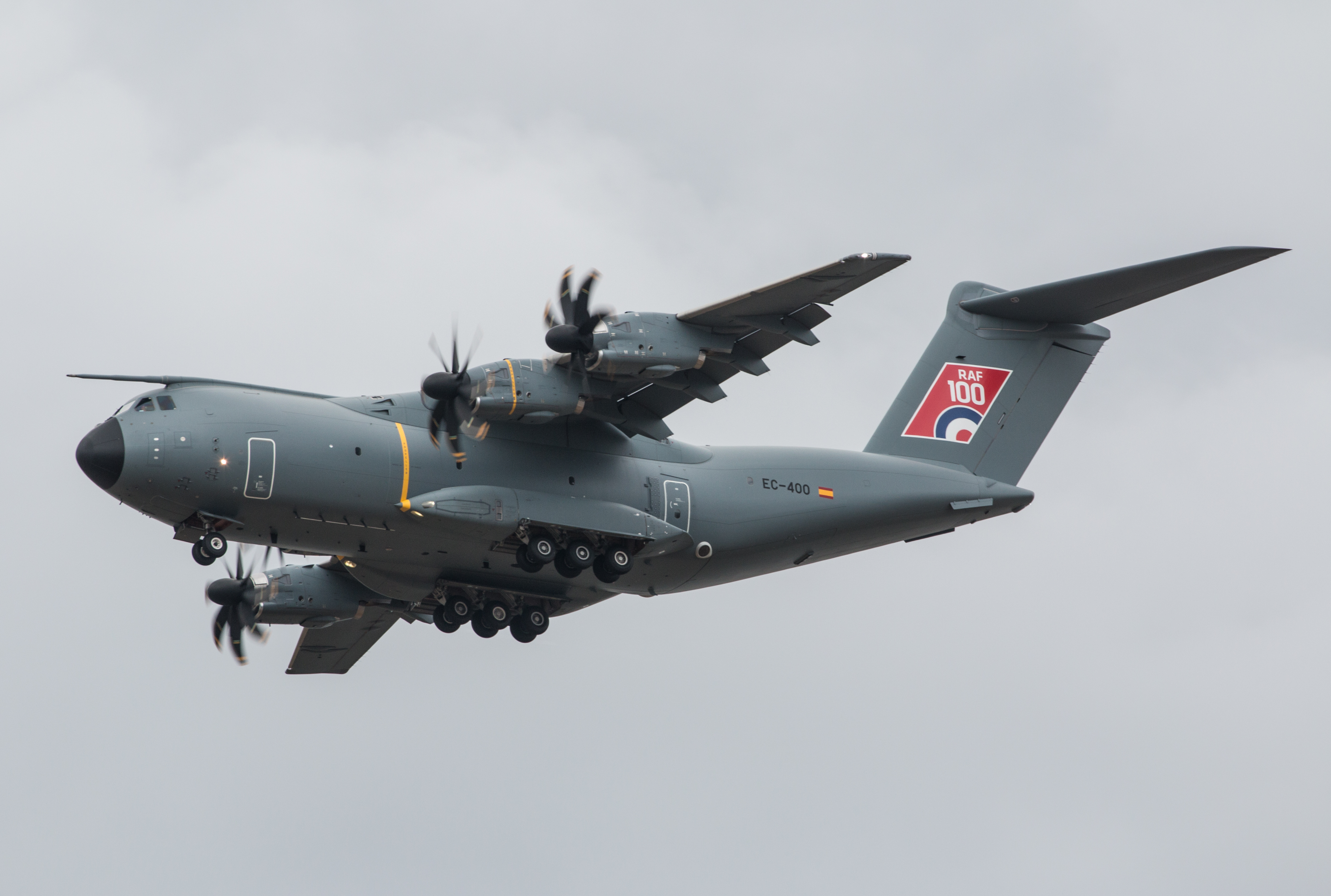
Airbus A400M Atlas transport aircraft

Military transport (logistics) aircraft are primarily used to transport troops and war supplies. Cargo can be attached to pallets, which are easily loaded, secured for flight, and quickly unloaded for delivery. Cargo also may be discharged from flying aircraft on parachutes, eliminating the need for landing. Also included in this category are aerial tankers; these planes can refuel other aircraft while in flight. An example of a transport aircraft is the C-17 Globemaster III. A World War II example would be the C-47. An example of a tanker craft would be the KC-135 Stratotanker. Transport helicopters and gliders can transport troops and supplies to areas where other aircraft would be unable to land. Calling a military transport aircraft a "cargo plane" is inaccurate, because military transport planes are able to carry paratroopers and other personnel.

=== Airborne early warning and control ===
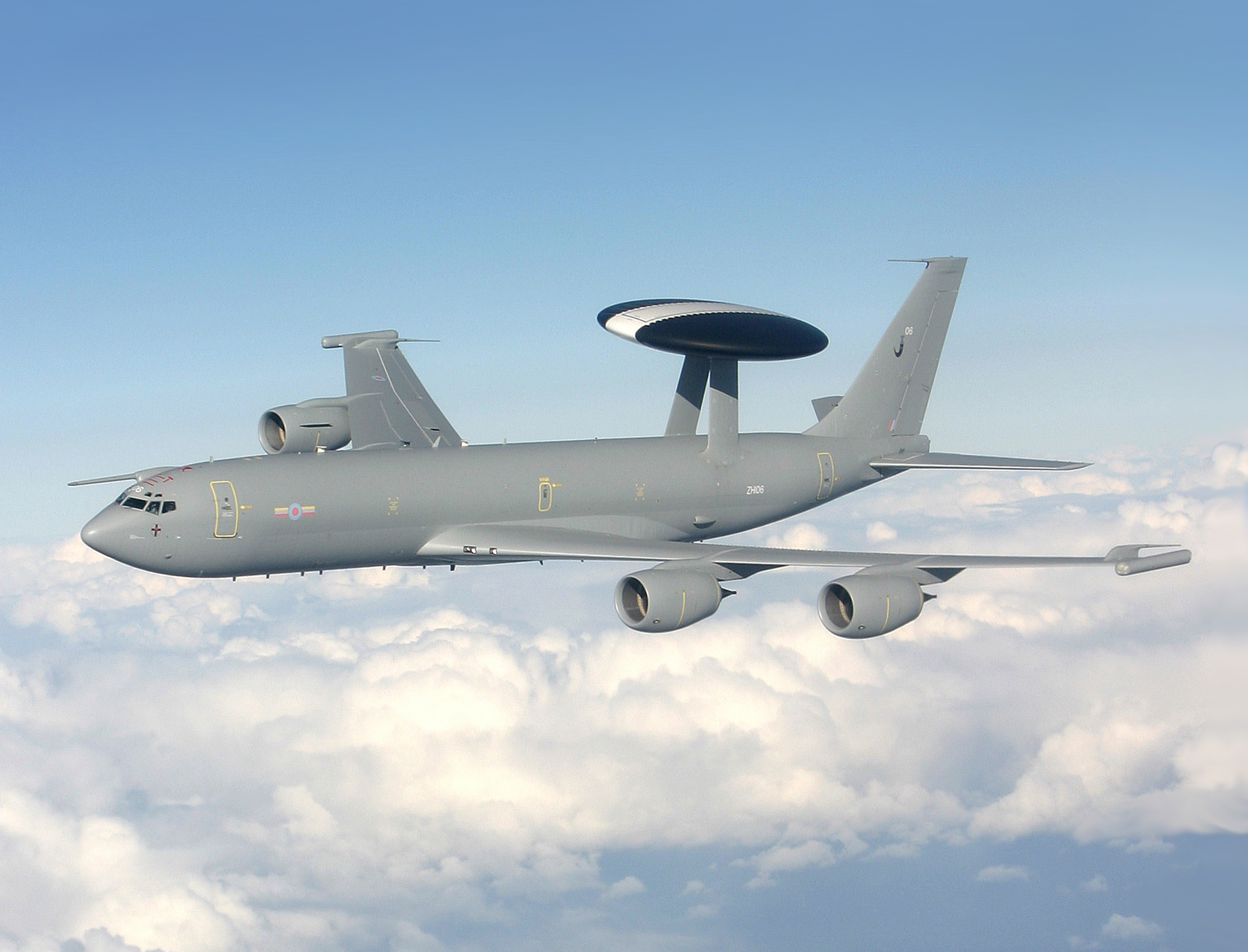
Boeing E-3 Sentry AEW&C aircraft

An airborne early warning and control (AEW&C) system is an airborne radar system designed to detect aircraft, ships and ground vehicles at long ranges and control and command the battle space in an air engagement by directing fighter and attack aircraft strikes. AEW&C units are also used to carry out surveillance, including over ground targets and frequently perform C2BM (command and control, battle management) functions similar to an Airport Traffic Controller given military command over other forces. Used at a high altitude, the radars on the aircraft allow the operators to distinguish between friendly and hostile aircraft hundreds of miles away.

AEW&C aircraft are used for both defensive and offensive air operations, and are to the NATO and American trained or integrated air forces what the combat information center is to a naval vessel, plus a highly mobile and powerful radar platform. The system is used offensively to direct fighters to their target locations, and defensively in order to counterattacks by enemy forces, both air and ground. So useful is the advantage of command and control from a high altitude, the United States Navy operates AEW&C aircraft off its Supercarriers to augment and protect its carrier combat information center (CICs). AEW&C is also known by the older terms "airborne early warning" (AEW) and "airborne warning and control system" (AWACS, /ˈeɪwæks/ ay-waks) although AWACS is the name of a specific system currently used by NATO and the USAF and is often used in error to describe similar systems.

=== Reconnaissance and surveillance ===
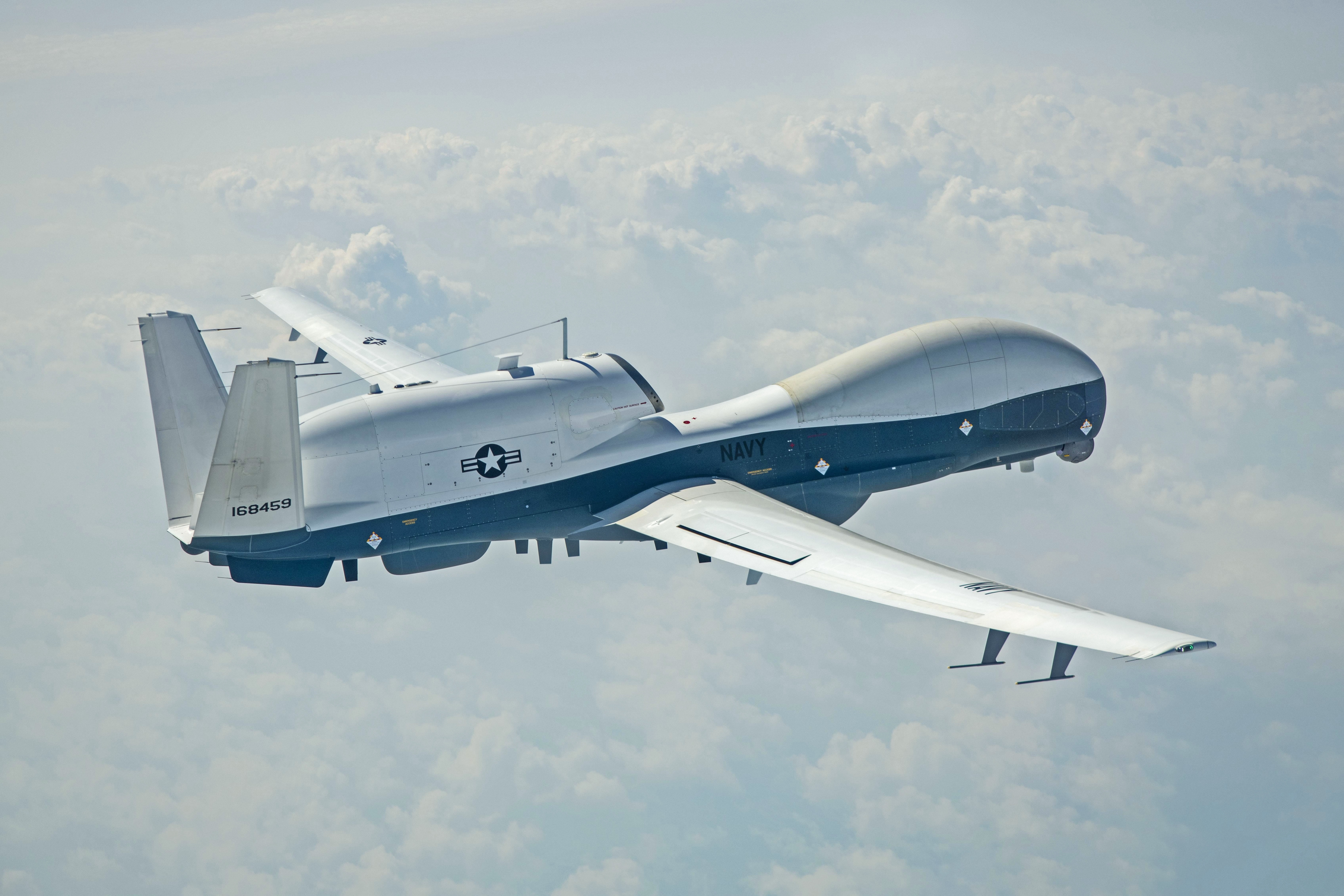
MQ-4C Triton reconnaissance aircraft

Reconnaissance aircraft are primarily used to gather intelligence. They are equipped with cameras and other sensors. These aircraft may be specially designed or may be modified from a basic fighter or bomber type. This role is increasingly being filled by military satellites and unmanned aerial vehicles (UAVs). Surveillance and observation aircraft use radar and other sensors for battlefield surveillance, airspace surveillance, maritime patrol, and artillery spotting. They include modified civil aircraft designs, moored balloons and UAVs.

=== Experimental ===
Experimental aircraft are designed in order to test advanced aerodynamic, structural, avionic, or propulsion concepts. These are usually well instrumented, with performance data telemetered on radio-frequency data links to ground stations located at the test ranges where they are flown. An example of an experimental aircraft is the Bristol 188.

== See also ==
- List of aircraft
- List of attack aircraft
- List of bomber aircraft
- List of fighter aircraft
- List of military transport aircraft
- List of tanker aircraft
