= Blauw =

Blauw and blauwe is Dutch for blue. It may refer to:

== People ==
- Piet Blauw (1937–2019), Dutch politician
- Johannes Blauw (1912-2007), Dutch theologian

== Places ==
- Blauwbrug (Dutch: Blauw Bridge), Amsterdam, Netherlands
- Blauwe Theehuis (Dutch: Blauwe Teahouse), Vondelpark, Amsterdam, Netherlands
- Blauwe Meer (Dutch: Blue Lake), Drenthe, Netherlands
- Blauwestad (Dutch: Blauwe Town), Groningen, Netherlands

== Other uses ==
- "Blauw", a 1991 song by Dutch band The Scene
- Amsterdams Blauw, a clothing line by Scotch & Soda (clothing)

== See also ==
- Blau (disambiguation)
- Blaw (disambiguation)
- Blue (disambiguation)
