= Blaeu =

Blaeu is the name of

- Willem Blaeu (1571–1638), Dutch cartographer and father of Joan Blaeu
- Joan Blaeu (1596–1673), Dutch cartographer and son of Willem Blaeu
- Blaeu Atlas of Scotland, by Joan Blaeu, published in 1654
- Atlas Blaeu or Atlas Maior, by Joan Blaeu, published in 1635
- Stedenboek Blaeu or Toonneel der Steeden, by Joan Blaeu, published in 1649

== See also ==
- Blaauw, a surname
