= Blau gas =

Artificial illuminating gas similar to propane

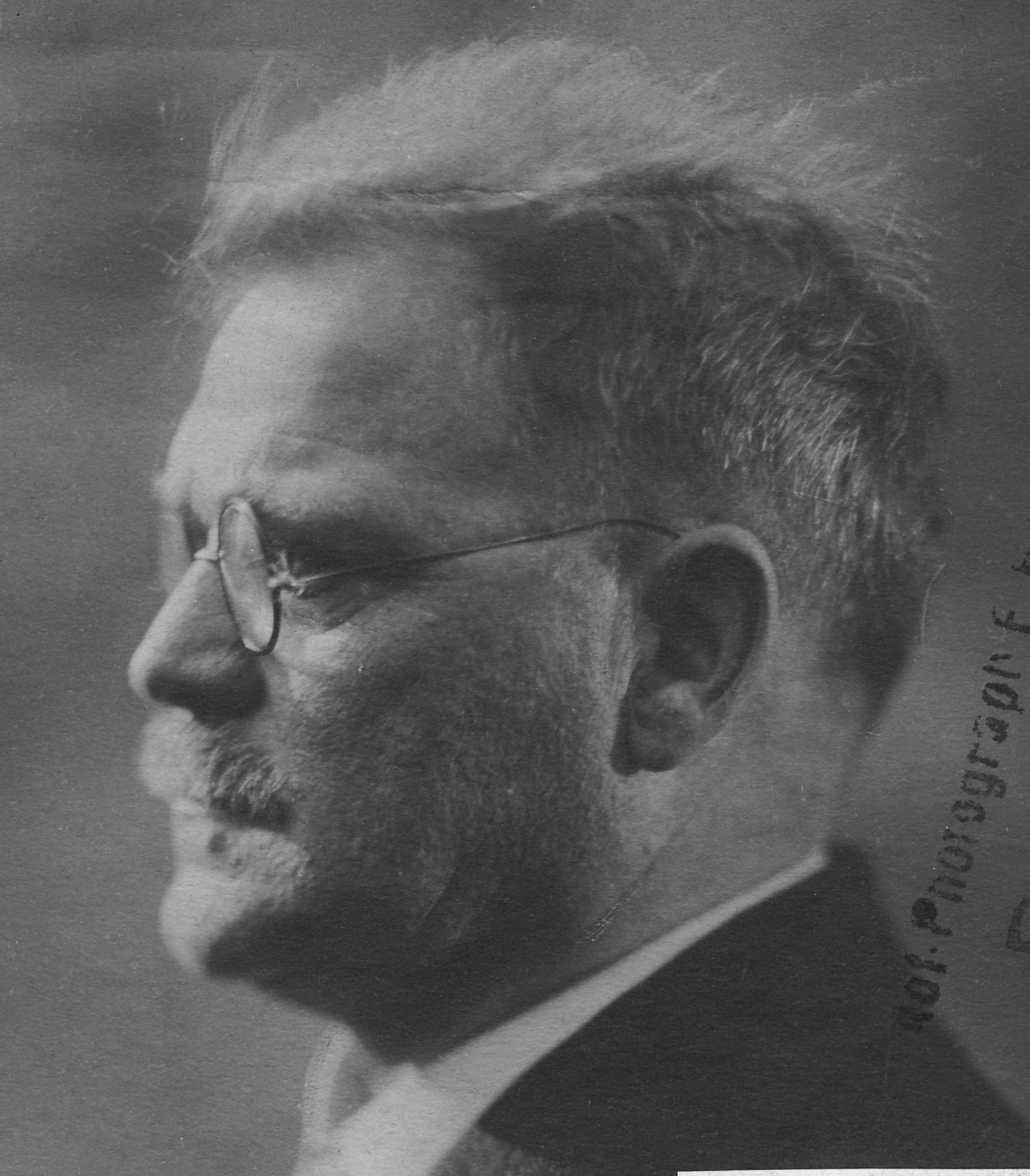
Hermann Blau

Blau gas (German: Blaugas) is an artificial illuminating gas that is similar to propane. It is named after its inventor, Hermann Blau of Augsburg, Germany. Rarely used or produced today, it is manufactured by decomposing mineral oils in retorts by heat, and compressing the resulting naphtha until it liquefied. It is transported in liquid condition, and, like LPG, when released returns to a gaseous state.

The density relative to air is 0.963, giving an average molecular weight of 27.9. One litre at 0 °C and 1,010 hPa (760 mmHg) contains 1.246 grams, of which 1.042 is carbon and 0.204 is hydrogen, giving an average of 1.94 carbon atoms and 4.54 hydrogen atoms per molecule. Blau gas contains about 50% olefins (alkenes), 37% methane and other alkanes, 6% hydrogen, while the rest is air. The heat of combustion is 12,318 kcal, or 51.5 MJ, per kg.

Blau was historically stored in steel cylinders for shipment, and, around the turn of the century, had the advantage of possessing the highest specific energy of all artificially produced gases. Chemically, Blau gas is similar to coal gas, but, unlike coal gas, is free from carbon monoxide. Furthermore, Blau gas is difficult to bring to explosion.

It was obtained from thermal decomposition of hydrocarbons (especially distillates from lignite and oil shale, but also other mineral oils). In contrast to the procedure for oil gas, which was produced by the Pintsch company from 1909, was also shipped in steel cylinders and had distillation temperatures of 900 to 1000 degrees Celsius to gasify the oil as completely as possible, the Blaugas process used lower temperatures of 550 °C to 600 °C and greater precompression. Easily condensable (gasoline-like) hydrocarbons were separated in the process (initially by additional cooling) before final compression in the liquefied gas cylinders.

Blau gas was burned for lighting and heating; a less-pure form known as Pintsch gas fuelled illuminated buoys and beacons (for navigation), railroad car lights and stoves in the late 19th and early 20th centuries.

== Use in Zeppelins ==
Blau gas is most famous, however, as the buoyancy compensating fuel for the LZ 127 Graf Zeppelin. Because its density is approximately the same as that of air, burning Blau gas and thereby replacing its volume with air does not lighten the gas cells of an airship, thereby eliminating the need to adjust buoyancy or ballast in-flight.

== See also ==
- August Riedinger
- History of manufactured gas
- K-1 (airship)
