= Leslie Blau =

Hungarian writer and historian (1921–2021)

- Blau László
- Born: Leslie Yitczhak Moshe Blau; October 1921; Budapest, Hungary
- Died: October 2021 (aged 99–100); Boro Park, Brooklyn, New York City
- Occupations: Author, historian
- Known for: Holocaust activism
- Awards: Distinguished Citizen of Bonyhad

Leslie Blau (Hungarian: Blau László) (October 1921 — October 2021) was a noted author, historian, and survivor of the Holocaust. He is best known for his 1994 work "Bonyhad: A Destroyed Community" about the impact of the Holocaust on the town of Bonyhád in his native Hungary.

== Personal life ==
Blau was born in Budapest, Hungary in 1921. He studied in the Jewish High School of Budapest. As a youngster, he spent his summer months in his father's hometown of Bonyhád.

Blau survived the horrors committed on the Jews during World War II by a stroke of luck, never being sent to the copper mines of Yugoslavia like many of his peers due to a mix-up. Hungary's anti-Jewish laws forbade Blau to continue academic studies, so he learned instead how to knit. In his early 20s, during the final years of World War II, he worked in a textile mill.

After the war, Blau and his now-widowed mother settled in the town on Bonyhad, where he married a local girl, Sara Kuttner. They had two children, Edit and Bela. In 1956, during the Hungarian Revolution of 1956, he and his family fled communist Hungary for a safer haven: USA. He arrived in Boro Park, Brooklyn, New York where he lived for over fifty years.

For thirty years, Blau worked in New York in the clothing business, knitting sweaters for New York retailers. As an active member of the Jewish community in Boro Park, Blau sat on the executive committee of B'nai Israel of Linden Heights. There, he hosted a yearly event to recount tales of the Holocaust for the benefit of the next generation.

Blau died in October 2021 at the age of 100.

== "Bonyhad: A Destroyed Community" ==
In 1989, Blau and his family visited Bonyhad for the first time in many years. They were shocked to see the formerly vibrant town now devoid of its Jewish life. This spurred Blau's decision to begin work on researching the Jewish history of Bonyhad. After five years of extensive investigation and research, Blau published his work, "Bonyhad: A Destroyed Community" in 1994. It was published by Shengold Publishers and sold over 1,000 copies in New York City alone.

In 2008, a Hungarian translation of the book was published with the amended title, "Bonyhad: A Destroyed Jewish Community" (Hungarian: "Bonyhád: egy elpusztított zsidó közösség"). The author visited Bonyhad with his wife, daughter and nephew for a presentation of the book at Bonyhad's City Hall, where he was presented a Distinguished Citizen of Bonyhad award by Mayor Potapi Arpad. Just prior to his trip to Hungary, he was the subject of a profile, "A Brooklyn Gentleman", by Reuters correspondent, Mirjam Donath.

Mr. Blau's research has been cited by such prestigious scholars as Sir Martin Gilbert.

== Works ==
- A Destroyed Community (1994, Shengold Publishings) (ISBN 0884001784), original edition
- Leslie Blau/Blau László: Bonyhád, egy elpusztított zsidó közösség. A magyarországi Bonyhád zsidóságának története; Soha többé Soá! Alapítvány, Bonyhád, 2008 (ISBN 9789630661003), Hungarian translation
- בונ'האד: חורבן קהילה יהודיה, Hebrew translation (edited by Rabbi Reuven Chaim Klein)
