= K-1 (airship) =

General information
- Type: Blimp (non-rigid airship)
- National origin: United States
- Manufacturer: Goodyear Tire and Rubber Company
- Primary user: United States Navy
- Number built: 1

The K-1 was an experimental blimp designed by the United States Navy in 1929. The K-1 was not the prototype of the later K-class blimps.

== Procurement ==
Due to the inability to get Congressional approval for the construction of an airship, the navy used the ploy of ordering a "universal" control car (type J/K) which could be used on the J-class blimps from the Naval Aircraft Factory. An order was placed with Goodyear Tire and Rubber Company for an envelope to hold "experimental gases". To complete the deception, there is no record of the US Navy assigning a serial number to the K-1, and standard Army TC-class blimp tail fins were procured from Goodyear.

== Design ==
Unlike past Navy blimps, the control car was not suspended from external cables, but was hung from cables attached to the top of the envelope, and the car was carried flush against the envelope as in modern blimps. The control car carried bunks and a galley so that a relief crew could be carried, and was completely enclosed. The K-1 was also the first Navy blimp to have a taxi wheel. Like the Graf Zeppelin, the fuel for the K-1 was "blau gas" a mixture of combustible gases with the same density as air, which meant that the valving of gas as the fuel was consumed was not necessary. The only serious drawback was the tendency of the fuel to leak into the helium which then could not be run through the Lakehurst purification plant, which meant the expensive helium had to be vented to atmosphere when too contaminated or an overhaul was necessary.

== Operations ==
K-1 was assembled at Lakehurst, New Jersey in late 1931. After tests it was based at Cape May. In November 1931 K-1 was being moved into the hangar when a gust of wind blew it into a barbed wire fence. The rip cord was pulled and K-1 deflated. The K-1 was shipped to Goodyear at Akron for repair. While under repair the K-1 was fitted with more powerful Wright R-975-20 engines. In mid-1933 the K-1 was sent to Lakehurst and after the departure of J-4 to Sunnyvale, was with the ZMC-2, the only flying airships at Lakehurst until 1937. The K-1 last flew in September 1940, and was subsequently used for mooring and snow removal experiments until it was scrapped in October 1941. The K-1 was not a popular airship, tending to fly tail low, and was, despite its amenities, thought to be 'uncomfortable."

== Specifications (K-1) ==
General characteristics

- Length: 219 ft 2.5 in (66.815 m)
- Diameter: 53 ft 11 in (16.43 m)
- Height: 70 ft (21 m)
- Volume: 319,000 cu ft (9,000 m^{3}) * Ballonet: 2 of, 104,400 cu ft (2,960 m^{3})
- Fuel gas ballonet: 1 of, 51,700 cu ft (1,460 m^{3})
- Useful lift: 7,684 lb (3,485 kg)
- Powerplant: 2 × Wright R-975-20 9-cyl. air-cooled radial piston engine, 300 hp (220 kW) each

Performance

- Maximum speed: 63 mph (102 km/h, 55 kn)
- Cruise speed: 46 mph (74 km/h, 40 kn)
- Range: 1,082 mi (1.0 km, 940 nmi) at max speed
- Cruising range: 1,887 mi (1,640 nmi; 3,037 km) at cruise speed

== See also ==
- List of airships of the United States Navy
