= Blaw-Knox =

Manufacturer of road paving equipment

Blaw-Knox is a manufacturer of road paving equipment. The company was created in 1917 from the merger of Blaw Collapsible Steel Centering Company and the Knox Pressed and Welded Steel Company. Blaw-Knox was sold to new owners in 1968, changed owners a few times thereafter, and continues as the Volvo Blaw-Knox brand of paving equipment, sold to Volvo Construction Equipment since 2007. Since July 2020 it is owned by Gencor Industries Inc.

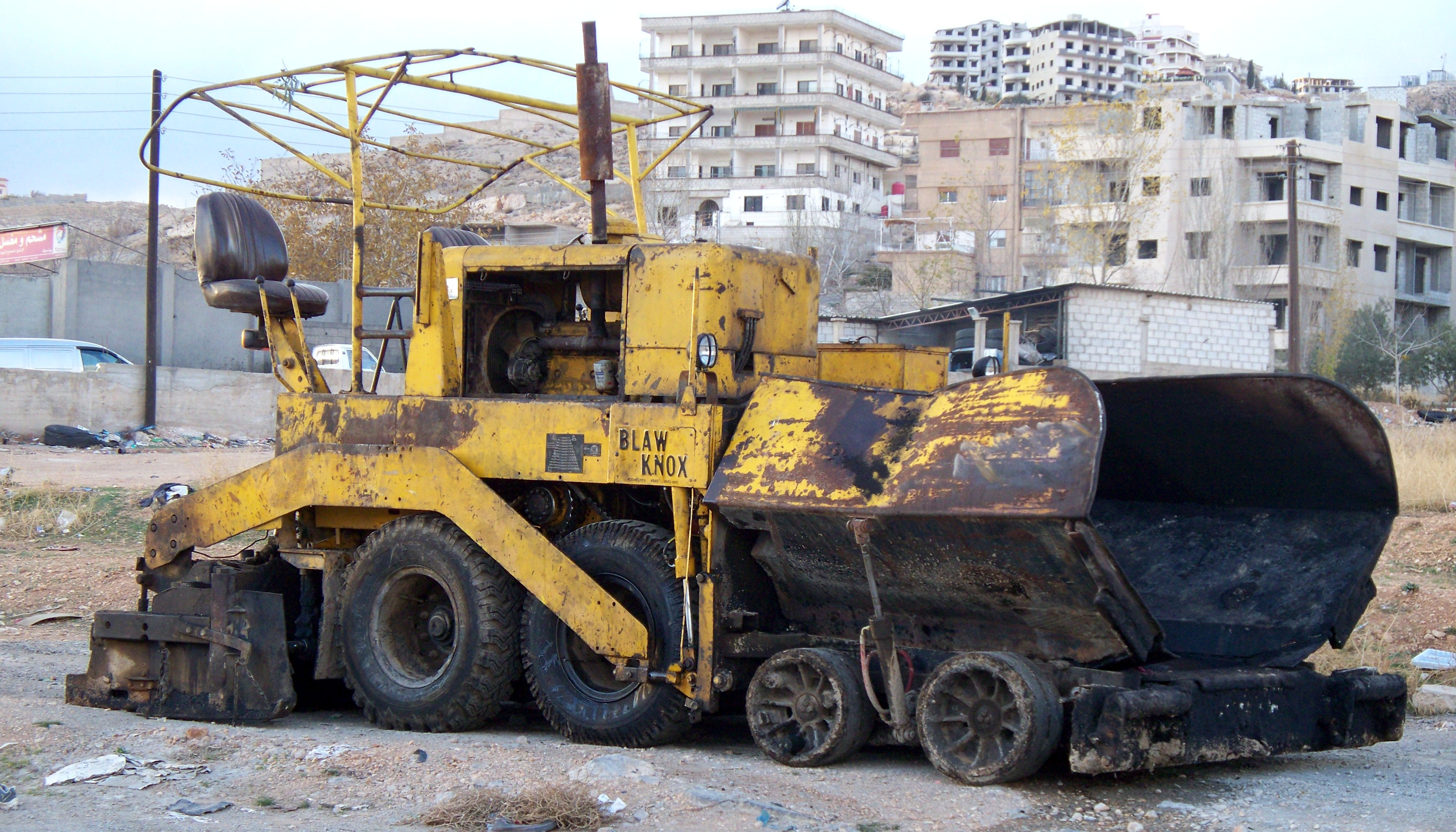
Blaw-Knox paver in Syria

== Early history ==
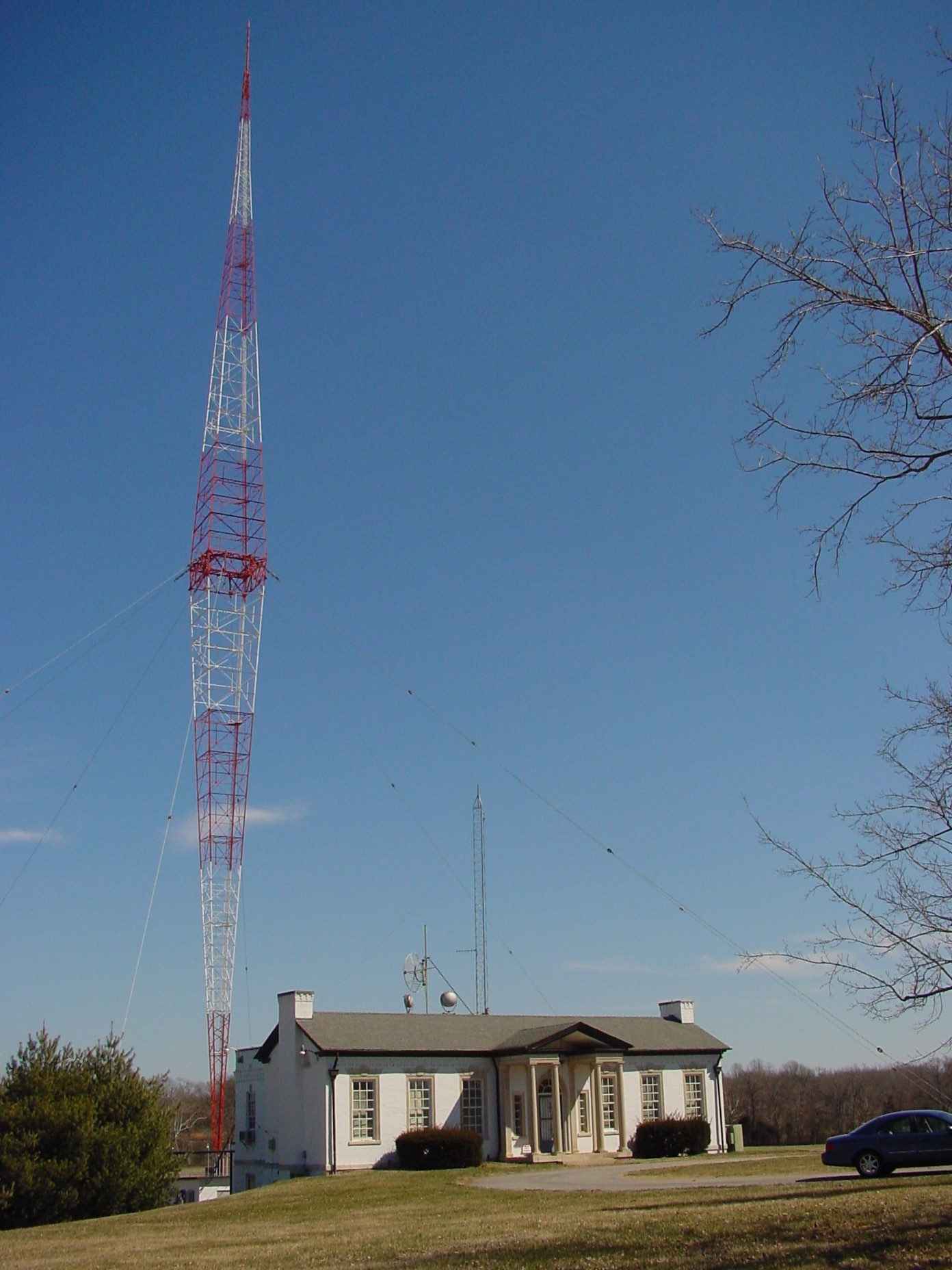
The 808 foot (246 m) WSM (AM) Blaw-Knox tower, in Brentwood, Tennessee.

In 1906, Jacob B. Blaw created the Blaw Collapsible Steel Centering Company, located in New Jersey, to manufacturer his patented steel form used to construct improved concrete circular tubes for sewers and tunnels. In 1909, Luther Knox created the Knox Pressed and Welded Steel Company to manufacture steel products used in high temperature applications. In July 1917, the firms merged to form the Blaw-Knox Company.

Blaw-Knox added the construction of radio towers to its operation in 1927, and soon developed the distinctive diamond-shaped Blaw-Knox Tower design of vertical, medium wave radio towers. Several are now listed on the US National Register of Historic Places.

In 1929, Blaw-Knox purchased the A. W. French & Company paving equipment company, which manufactured machines that produced concrete roads, a natural extension of the Blaw-Knox expertise in concrete and steel works.

== Paving equipment ==
As highway construction moved away from rigid concrete construction, Blaw-Knox began making highway pavers for the new method of flexible asphalt paving (tarmac).

In 1931 Blaw-Knox introduced a form-riding finisher for asphalt paving. By 1932 they released the first self-propelled non-form riding finisher for the placement of stones and asphalt. Until this time it had been common to pave roads using formwork on either side of the pavement. These new machines were essentially a self-propelled tailgate spreader that pushed the asphalt truck. In 1943 they introduced the first road widener. In 1954 they introduced the first wheel-driven, rather than track-driven, paver. The paver tires rode on a prepared base -- or often on an older pavement -- and the paver pushed the asphalt truck. The screed was the hindmost part of the paver. The hot mix was dumped into a front hopper, then carried back by conveyors to be dropped in front of the screed, where horizontal augers would distribute it laterally. In 1956, they developed the first auto-grade-and-slope pavers.

Blaw-Knox went on to establish a broad line of paving machines for the US and UK markets. The UK employed a distinctly different paving method, applying a deeper mat of asphalt than was common in the US, which resulted in a marked reduction in paving speed.

The Blaw-Knox UK design and manufacturing division was eventually based at Rochester, Kent, in southeast England, on the former site of the Short Brothers flying boat factory.

== Changes in ownership ==
Blaw-Knox was purchased by White Consolidated Industries (WCI) in May 1968. The Blaw-Knox Construction Equipment Corporation name was used for the new WCI subsidiary.

In April 1994, WCI sold the Blaw-Knox unit, based in Mattoon, Illinois, to Clark Equipment Company for US$144 million ($305 million today).

In March 1995, Ingersoll-Rand offered $1.34 billion ($2.8 billion today) in a hostile takeover bid for Clark Equipment Company. Clark cited its Blaw-Knox unit as a reason for the US Federal Court to stop the takeover, claiming that Ingersoll-Rand would violate Federal antitrust laws since Ingersoll-Rand already controlled a significant share of the paving equipment business, having purchased the German paving equipment company ABG in 1990, while Blaw-Knox owned a major share of the US paving market (which would grow to 50% of all new pavers bearing the Blaw-Knox brand by 2006). A few days later, in April 1995, Clark accepted a higher $1.5 billion ($3.1 billion today) offer from Ingersoll-Rand, who became owners of Blaw-Knox and all other Clark companies. Ingersoll-Rand soon sold the UK design and manufacturing division to Babcock, while keeping the North American operations of Blaw-Knox as a stand-alone unit in its road construction equipment division.

In February 2007, Ingersoll-Rand accepted an offer of $1.3 billion ($2 billion today) from Volvo for the road construction equipment division, including the Blaw-Knox brand and the ABG brand.

In July 2020, Volvo Construction Equipment sold Blaw-Knox pavers to Gencor Industries Inc.

== See also ==
- Blawnox, Pennsylvania, a town named after its Blaw-Knox factory
