= Buoyancy compensator (aviation) =

Equipment to regulate buoyancy of airships

The static buoyancy of airships in flight is not constant. It is therefore necessary to control the altitude of an airship by controlling its buoyancy: buoyancy compensation.

== Changes which have an effect on buoyancy ==
- Changes in air temperature (and thus the density of air)
- Changes in lifting gas temperature (for example, the heating of the hull by the sun).
- Accumulation of additional ballast (for example, precipitation or icing on the envelope)
- Changes in ballast (for example, during a flight maneuver or the dropping of ballast)
- Changes in weight of fuel on board, due to fuel consumption. This was a challenge especially in the large historic airships like the Zeppelins.

For example, on a flight from Friedrichshafen to Lakehurst, the rigid airship LZ 126, built in 1923-24, used 23,000 kg gasoline and 1300 kg of oil (an average consumption of 290 kg/100 km). During the landing the airship had to release approximately 24,000 cubic meters of hydrogen to balance the ship before landing it. A Zeppelin of the size of the LZ 129 Hindenburg on a flight from Frankfurt am Main to Lakehurst consumed approximately 54 tonnes of diesel with a buoyancy equivalent of 48,000 cubic metres of hydrogen, which amounted to about a quarter of the lifting gas used at the start of the flight (200,000 cubic metres). After the landing, the jettisoned hydrogen was replaced with new hydrogen.

== Compensation measures ==
- Particular use of the dynamic buoyancy, see lift and drag.
- Increasing buoyancy by dropping ballast. This is done mostly by the jettisoning of ballast water similar to the dropping of sandbags in ballooning.
- The reduction of buoyancy by jettisoning lift gas or adding ballast.
- The reduction of buoyancy by compressing lift gas into pressurized tanks while taking air from the surrounding atmosphere into the vacant space
- Changing the density of the lifting gas by heating (more buoyancy) or cooling (less buoyancy).
- The use of vacuum/air buoyancy compensator tanks
- The use of thrust vectoring using ducted fans or propellers.

The Zeppelin NT has no special facilities to offset the extra buoyancy by fuel consumption. Compensation takes place by using a start-weight that is higher than the buoyancy lifting level at the start and during the flight, the extra dynamic buoyancy needed for lift-off and flight is produced with engines. If, during the trip, the ship becomes lighter than air because of fuel consumption, the swivel engines are used for down pressure and landing. The relatively small size of the Zeppelin NT and a range of only 900 kilometers compared to the historical Zeppelins allowed the waiver of a ballast extraction device.

== Buoyancy compensation ==
With a rigid airship two main strategies are pursued to avoid the venting of lifting gas:

1. The use of a fuel with the same density as air and therefore no increase in buoyancy caused by consumption.
2. Adding water as ballast by extraction during the trip.

=== Fuel with a density close to air ===
Only gasses have a density similar or equal to air.

==== Hydrogen ====
Different attempts were made on hydrogen airships: the LZ 127 and LZ 129 to use part of the lifting gas as a propellant without much success, later ships filled with helium lacked this option.

==== Blaugas ====
Around 1905, Blau gas was a common propellant for airships; it is named after its inventor the Augsburger chemist Hermann Blau who produced it in the Augsburger Blau gas plant. Various sources mention a mixture of propane and butane. Its density was 9% heavier than air. Zeppelins often used a different gas mixture of propylene, methane, butane, acetylene (ethyne), butylene and hydrogen.

The LZ 127 Graf Zeppelin had bi-fuel engines, and could use gasoline and Blau gas as a propellant. Twelve of the vessel's gas cells were filled with a propellant gas instead of lifting gas with a total volume of 30,000 cubic metres, enough for approximately 100 flight hours. The fuel tank had a gasoline volume of 67 flight hours. Using both gasoline and Blau gas, one could achieve 118 hours of cruise time.

=== Water as ballast ===
==== Dew and rainfall on the hull ====
In some airships rain gutters were fitted to the hull to collect rainwater to fill the ballast water tanks during flight. However, this procedure is weather dependent and is therefore not reliable as a standalone measure.

==== Water from the ground ====
Captain Ernst A. Lehmann described how during World War I Zeppelins could temporarily remain at the sea surface by loading ballast water into tanks in the gondolas. In 1921 the airships LZ 120 "Bodensee" and LZ 121 "Nordstern" tested the possibility on Lake Constance to use lake water to create ballast. These attempts, however, showed no satisfactory results.

==== Silica-gel method ====
The silica gel method was tested on the LZ 129 to extract water from the humid air to increase weight. The project was terminated.

==== Water from fuel combustion ====
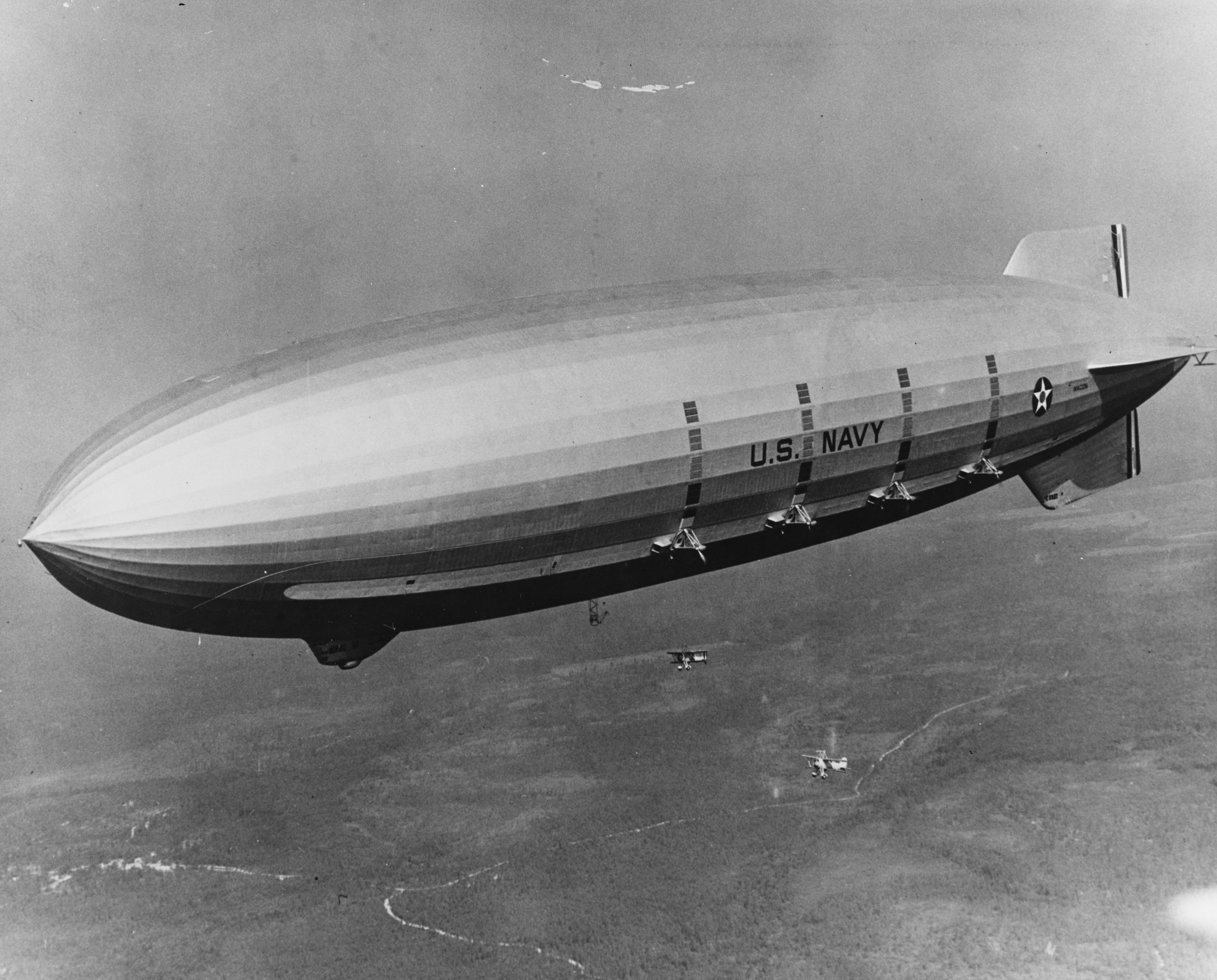
On the Macon, the exhaust water recovery condensers appear as dark vertical strips above each engine. The Akron and LZ 130 Graf Zeppelin had similar systems.

The most promising procedure for ballast extraction during the journey is condensation of the engines' exhaust gasses, which consist mainly of water vapour and carbon dioxide. The main factors affecting gainable water are the hydrogen content of the fuel and humidity. The necessary exhaust gas coolers for this method had repeated problems with corrosion in the early years.

The first trials on the DELAG-Zeppelin LZ 13 Hansa (1912–1916) were conducted by Wilhelm Maybach. The trials were not satisfactory, resulting in the project's termination.

The USS Shenandoah (ZR-1) (1923–25) was the first airship with ballast water recovered from the condensation of exhaust gas. Prominent vertical slots in the airship's hull acted as exhaust condensers. A similar system was used on her sister ship, USS Akron (ZRS-4). The German-made USS Los Angeles (ZR-3) was also fitted with exhaust gas coolers to prevent jettisoning of the costly helium.

=== Lifting gas temperature ===
Changes in the lifting gas temperature in relation to the surrounding air have an effect on the buoyancy balance: higher temperatures increase buoyancy; lower temperatures decrease buoyancy. Artificially changing the lifting gas temperature requires constant work as the gas is barely thermally isolated from the surrounding air. However, it was common to make use of natural differences in temperature such as thermal updrafts and clouds.

==== Preheated lifting gas ====
Preheated lifting gas was tested to offset the higher weight of the Zeppelin. One variation tested on the LZ 127 Graf Zeppelin was to blow heated air on the lifting gas storage cells with the aim to gain buoyancy for launch.

=== Lifting gas density ===
It is possible to change the density of a volume of lifting gas by compressing it with a Ballonet. Basically a balloon inside a balloon that can be pumped full of outside air from the surrounding atmosphere.

== See also ==
- Aerostat
- Blimp
- Loon (company)
