= Heinrich Blau =

German journalist (1858–1901)

- Born: 21 September 1858; Neu-Stettin, Pomerania
- Died: 1901 (aged 42–43)
- Occupations: Journalist, playwright
- Spouse: Helene Sundy
- Writing career
- Language: German

Heinrich Blau (21 September 1858 – 1901) was a German journalist and playwright.

== Biography ==
Blau was born to a Jewish family in Neu-Stettin, Pomerania. He received his education at the Jewish school and the Sophien Realschule in Berlin, where his parents had moved when he was a small child. When only thirteen years of age he wrote a metric translation of the Psalms. Blau in 1878 went to London, where he found employment on the Londoner Journal, a German paper, whose chief editor he became later. He was later engaged on the staffs of various German publications in the English capital.

Blau soon became a proficient journalist, writing both in English and in German; acting as correspondent of papers in Germany, and contributing to such English reviews as The Nineteenth Century and The Contemporary. He also translated literary works from and into English and German, besides writing feuilletons. During all this time he studied Sanskrit and Oriental literature; and the result was shown in Gautama, a dramatic poem in German in four acts.

Blau is the author of a drama in German blank verse, Thomas Chatterton, of Some Notes on the Stage and Its Influence upon the Education of the Masses, and of Some More Notes on the same subject, for which essays he received a gold medal from a London society. He also wrote libretti for light operas—San Lin and others—and the texts of the opera Das Erbe Judas and the oratorio Samuel, as well as the dramas Scherben, Bianca Capello, Die Prophezeiung, and Götzen.

In 1893 Blau came on a visit to the United States, but remained only a short time.

== Partial bibliography ==
- Thomas Chatterton: Tragodie in Vier Akten. London: Hirschfield Bros. 1887.
- Gautama: Dramatische gedicht in Fünf Akten (in German). London: Th. Wohlleben. 1896.
- San-Lin (Das Neujahrsfest): Oper aus dem Volksleben im Chinesenviertel von San-Francisco. Berlin: E. Bloch. 1898. Music composed by Victor Hollaender.
