= Hermann Blau =

German engineer, chemist, and inventor

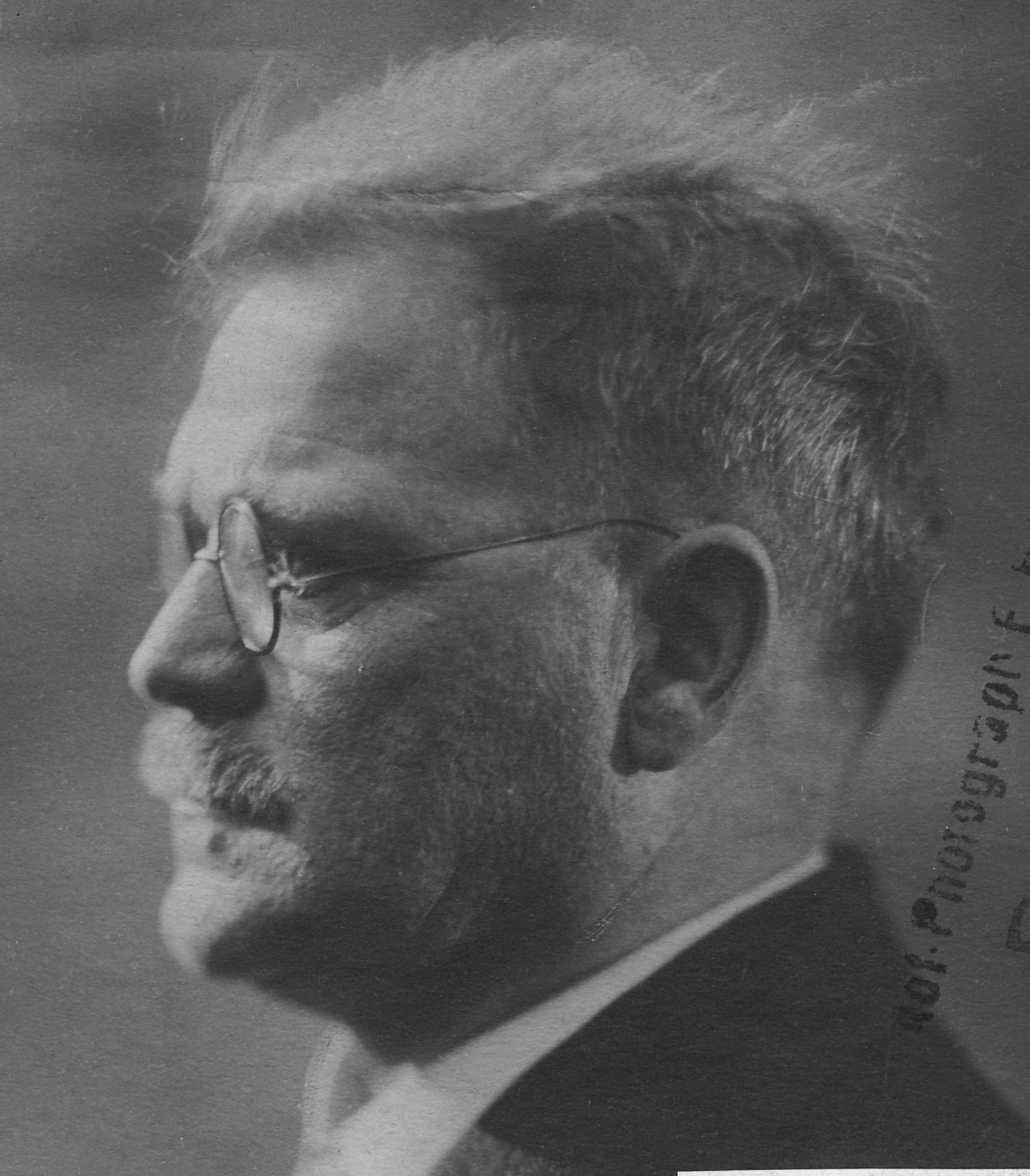
- Hermann Blau, 1871-1944
- Born: 21 January 1871; Graben, Karlsruhe, German Empire
- Died: 18 February 1944 (aged 73); Stephanskirchen, Rosenheim, Germany
- Scientific career
- Academic advisors: Adolf von Baeyer

Hermann Blau (21 January 1871 – 18 February 1944) was a German engineer and chemist, and inventor of Blau gas.

Blau, a student of the Nobel Prize–winning chemist Adolf von Baeyer, was originally a pharmacist, but devoted himself in later life entirely to chemistry. His attempts to separate gas mixtures by physical means eventually led to the great invention of his life, a transportable liquid lighting gas from the distillation of gases known as Blau gas.

It was the manufacturer Ludwig August Riedinger who inspired the inventor to start his first production facility, the Blaugas factory, in 1903 in Augsburg at the Auer roads. The Augsburg-based company operated later on with Riedinger under the name the German Blau gas company which controlled factories in Vienna, Budapest, Bucharest, Saint Petersburg, the United States, Canada and Cuba.

Blau gas has a rather water-like color. It was stored in steel cylinders for shipment and had the advantages that it possessed the highest specific energy from all artificial produced gases and unlike coal gas it was free from carbon monoxide. Its main use was for lighting purposes especially in places where coal gas was not available. Blau gas factories were operated in Denmark and Holland for the supply of lighthouses.

When electric lights became more common and the extraction of propane became popular because of its cheaper production, Blau gas was pushed out of the market. As a consequence of this decline, the Blaugas factory in Augsburg closed down in the fall of 1933, and moved the main operation of the company to a town in northern Germany.

Blau gas experienced an almost unexpected upswing when attempts were made to run the engines of the Zeppelin airships with Blau gas. The decisive factor was that the weight of Blau gas hardly differs from that of air and the use of large quantities of the propellant had little impact on the ships' buoyancy. This advantage was evident on the Zeppelin airship's first voyage to America. Starting in 1929, the Zeppelin construction facility in Friedrichshafen produced the required Blau gas in a Blau manufacturing plant; the use of Blau gas as a buoyancy compensator was demonstrated with the LZ 127 Graf Zeppelin.

Hermann Blau was born in Graben, Karlsruhe and died in Stephanskirchen, Rosenheim. He was married to Caroline Blau, had a daughter, Martha, and four sons, Hermann, Rudolf, Edmund and Theodor.
