= Ron Blaauw (chef) =

Dutch head chef and TV-personality

- Born: 7 September 1967 (age 58); Hoorn
- Occupation: Chef
- Employer: self-employed
- Known for: Two starred Ron Blaauw
- Website: http://www.ronblaauw.nl

Ron Blaauw (born 7 September 1967, in Hoorn) is a Dutch head chef and TV-personality, known for his cooking in the Michelin-starred restaurant Ron Blaauw.

== Culinary career ==
After finishing his secondary school he started working as cook in De Kersentuin in Amsterdam. He also worked in Aujourd'hui and 't Jagershuis.

In 1999, he started his own restaurant Ron Blaauw in Ouderkerk aan de Amstel. In 2004 and 2005 he was awarded one Michelin star for his cooking there. From 2006 to present he was awarded two stars each year by the Michelin Guide.

After a long and strict procedure, Blaauw was appointed SVH-meesterkok in June 2010.

In 2011, Blaauw moved his restaurant to Amsterdam. At the old location he created a new bistro-type fish restaurant with the name Ron's Vis van de Dag (Eng.: Ron's Fish of the Day).

On 27 March 2013, Ron Blaauw announced that he would close his eponymous restaurant on 30 March and open Ron Gastrobar on the same location on 4 April.

== TV-career ==
Blaauw participated in several series of the Dutch version of Top Chef on RTL: 2009, 2011, and 2012.

== HME Group ==
Blaauw is also "culinary director" of the HME Group (Horeca Management Entertainment Group) in Abcoude. This company is privately owned by Blaauw and several others.

Present and former restaurant managed by the HME Group are Groot Paardenburg (Ouderkerk aan de Amstel), Brasserie ’t Bonte Schort (Aalsmeer), Restaurant Sophia (Amsterdam), De Eendracht (Abcoude), Brasserie Keyzer (Amsterdam), 't Amsterdammertje (Loenen aan de Vecht), L’Entrecôte (The Hague), Ron's Vis van de Dag (Ouderkerk aan de Amstel).

== Awards ==
- One Michelin star: 2004 & 2005
- Two Michelin stars: 2006-present
- GaultMillau "Restaurateur/ondernemer 2009'"
- "Premio Villa Mass Award" 2012
