= Ron Blaauw (restaurant) =

Coordinates: 52°21′7.73″N 4°51′23.82″E

- Interactive map of Ron Blaauw

Restaurant information
- Established: 1999
- Closed: 2013
- Head chef: Ron Blaauw
- Food type: French, International
- Rating: Michelin Guide
- Location: Sophialaan 55, Amsterdam, 1075 BP, Netherlands
- Seating capacity: 60

Ron Blaauw was a restaurant located in Amsterdam in the Netherlands. It was a fine dining restaurant that was awarded one Michelin star in 2004 and 2005 and two Michelin stars in the period 2006–2013. GaultMillau awarded the restaurant 16.0 out of 20 points.

Ron Blaauw was a member of Alliance Gastronomique Néerlandaise, but left in 2011 due to lack of time.

The restaurant was originally located in Ouderkerk aan de Amstel. In 2011, it moved to Amsterdam.

On 27 March 2013, Ron Blaauw announced that he would close his eponymous restaurant on 30 March and open RON Gastrobar on the same location on 4 April.

== See also ==
- List of Michelin-starred restaurants in the Netherlands
