= Lajos Blau =

Jewish–Hungarian scholar and professor (1861–1936)

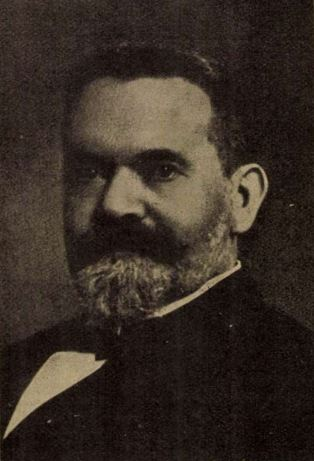
Lajos Blau

Lajos Blau (German: Ludwig Blau; 29 April 1861 – 8 March 1936) was a Jewish–Hungarian scholar of philosophy and Oriental studies, professor of Jewish studies, and publicist born at Putnok, in the Kingdom of Hungary.

== Biography ==
Blau was educated at three different yeshivot in the Kingdom of Hungary, among them that of Presburg. In 1880–1888, he was a student at the Rabbinical Seminary of Budapest (Landesrabbinerschule, now the Budapest University of Jewish Studies). At the same time, he studied philosophy and Oriental studies at the University of Budapest, where he earned a Ph.D. degree cum laude in 1887, and the diploma at the Rabbinical Seminary in 1888.

In 1887, Blau became a teacher of Talmudic literature at the Rabbinical Seminary of Budapest; in 1888 he served there as a substitute professor, and in 1889 as professor of the Hebrew Bible, the languages of Hebrew and Aramaic, and the Talmud. Beginning in 1899, he became a librarian and tutor in Jewish history.

In 1902, Blau became president of the folklore section of the Jewish–Hungarian Literary Society, editor of the Magyar Zsido Szemle, and a contributor to the Jewish Encyclopedia (1906). He died in 1936.

== Works ==
Blau's academic publications have dealt chiefly with the following topics:

- Jewish literature and history of the Jews in the Talmudic and early post-Talmudic periods, for example:
  - Beiträge zur Erklärung der Mechilta und des Sifre, in the Steinschneider Festschrift, 1896
  - Quelques Notes sur Jésus ben Sirach, in Revue Etudes Juives, xxxv. 19-47
  - Das Altjüdische Zauberwesen, Strasbourg, 1898
- The Jewish traditions regarding the Masorah, for example:
  - Massoretische Untersuchungen, Strasburg, 1891
  - Masoretic Studies, in Jewish Quarterly Review, viii., ix.)
- The development of the Hebrew Bible canon, for example:
  - Zur Einleitung in die Heilige Schrift, Strasburg, 1894.

Blau also published Der Concursus Vitiorum nach Talmudischem Recht, Budapest, 1887; and Die Erwählung Israel's (in Hungarian), ib. 1890; and contributed to the Monatsschrift, Zeitschrift für Hebräische Bibliographie, Jahrbuch des Ungarischen Litteraturvereines, Jahrbuch der Deutschen Litteraturvereines, etc.
