= Hindenburg-class airship =

German passenger airships (1936–39)

Hindenburg class
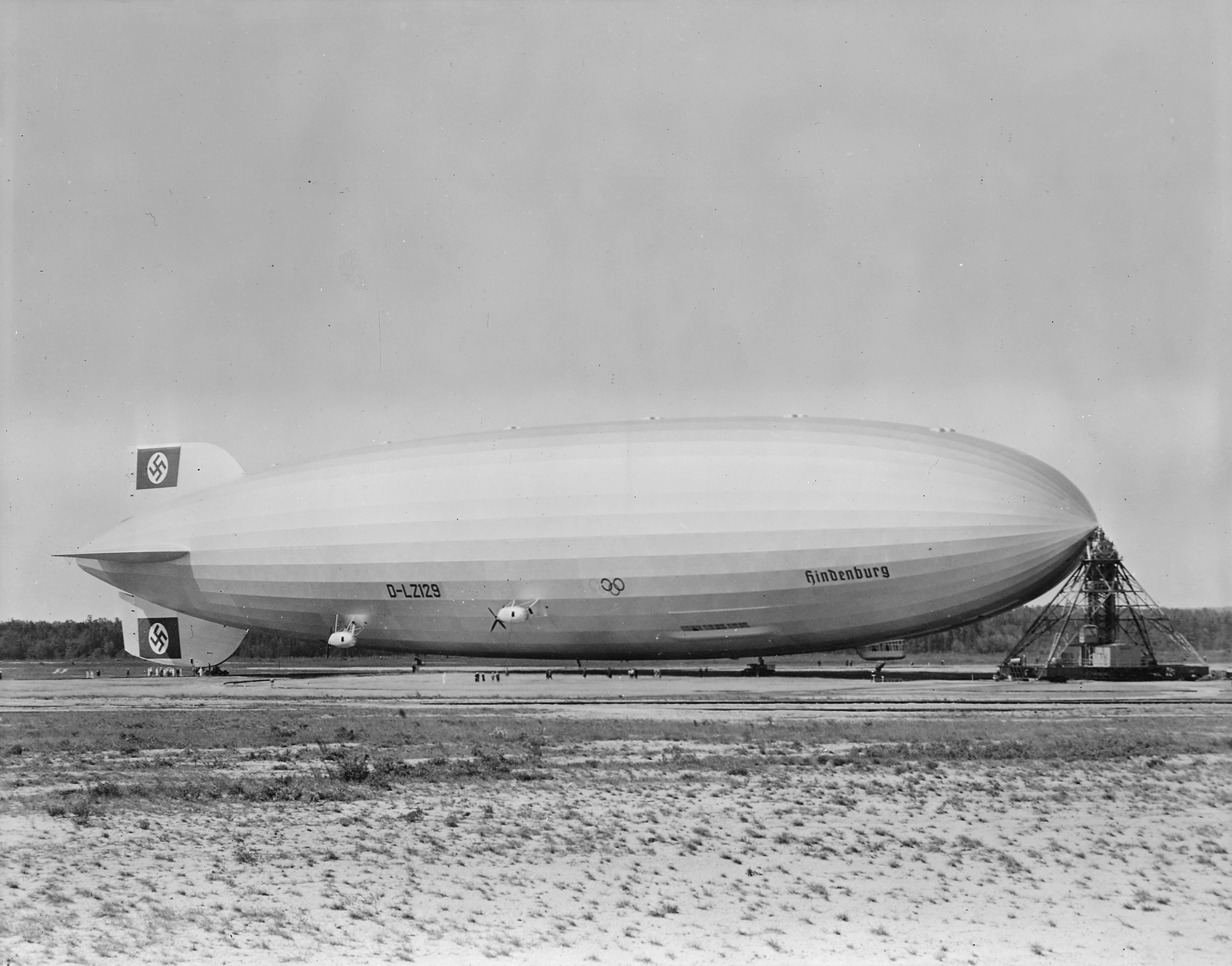
- Hindenburg at NAS Lakehurst

General information
- Type: Passenger airship
- National origin: Germany
- Manufacturer: Luftschiffbau Zeppelin
- Designer: Ludwig Dürr
- Status: Crashed at Lakehurst, New Jersey (LZ 129); Scrapped (LZ 130))
- Primary user: Deutsche Zeppelin-Reederei
- Number built: 2

History
- First flight: March 4, 1936 (LZ 129) September 14, 1938 (LZ 130)
- Retired: 1937 (LZ 129) 1939 (LZ 130)

The two Hindenburg-class airships were hydrogen-filled, passenger-carrying rigid airships built in Germany in the 1930s and named in honor of Paul von Hindenburg. They were the last such aircraft to be constructed, and in terms of their length, height, and volume, the largest aircraft ever built. During the 1930s, airships like the Hindenburg class were widely considered the future of air travel, and the lead ship of the class, LZ 129 Hindenburg, established a regular transatlantic service. The airship's destruction in a highly publicized accident was the end of these expectations. The second ship, LZ 130 Graf Zeppelin, was never operated on a regular passenger service, and was scrapped in 1940 along with its namesake predecessor, the LZ 127 Graf Zeppelin, by order of Hermann Göring.

== Design and development ==
The Hindenburg class were built entirely from duralumin. The leader of the design team was Ludwig Dürr, who had overseen the design of all Zeppelins except LZ-1 (on which he was a crew member), under the overall direction of Hugo Eckener, the head of the company. They were 245 m (804 ft) long and 41 m (135 ft) in diameter. The previous largest civilian airship, with a length of 237 m (777 ft) and a width of 40 m (130 ft), was the British R101, which was completed in 1929. The U.S. Navy's Akron and Macon were 239 m (785 ft) long and 44 m (144 ft) wide.

The design originally called for cabins for 50 passengers and a crew complement of 40.

Construction of the first ship, LZ 129, later named Hindenburg, began in 1931, but was suddenly stopped when Luftschiffbau Zeppelin went bankrupt. This led Eckener to make a deal with the Nazi Party, which had come to power in 1933. He needed money to build the airship; in return he agreed to display the swastika on the fins. Construction resumed in 1935. The keel of the second ship, LZ 130 Graf Zeppelin was laid on June 23, 1936, and the cells were inflated with hydrogen on August 15, 1938. As the second Zeppelin to carry the name Graf Zeppelin (after the LZ 127), it is often referred to as Graf Zeppelin II.

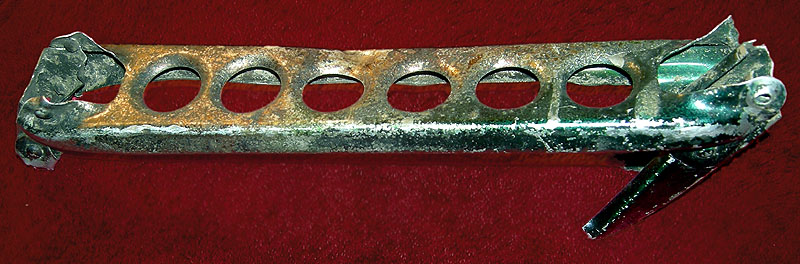
A fire-damaged 23 cm (9 in) duralumin cross brace from the frame of the Hindenburg salvaged in May 1937 from the crash site at NAS Lakehurst

The duralumin frame was covered by cotton cloth varnished with iron oxide and cellulose acetate butyrate impregnated with aluminium powder. The aluminium was added to reflect both ultraviolet, which damaged the fabric, and infrared light, which caused heating of the gas. This was an innovation that was first used on the LZ 126, which was provided as war reparations to the United States and served as the USS Los Angeles (ZR-3) from 1924 until decommissioned in 1933.

The structure was held together by many large rings, 15 of which were gas cell boundaries which formed bulkheads. These bulkheads were braced by steel wires which connected up into the axial catwalk. The longitudinal duralumin girders connected all the rings together and formed "panels". The 16 gas cells were made of cotton and a gas-tight material. On Graf Zeppelin, the cells were lightened and one was made of lightweight silk instead of cotton.

Hydrogen was vented out through valves on the top of the ship. These valves could be controlled both manually and automatically. The axial catwalk was added across the center of the ship to provide access to the gas valves. A keel catwalk provided access to the crew quarters and the engines. Alongside the keel were water ballast and fuel tanks. The tail fins of the airship were over 30 m (100 ft) in length, and were held together with a cross-like structure. The lower tail fin also had an auxiliary control room in case the controls in the gondola malfunctioned.

Hindenburg was powered by four reversible 890 kW (1,190 hp) Daimler-Benz diesel engines which gave the airship a maximum speed of 135 km/h (84 mph). Although the Graf Zeppelin had the same engine car design in its early stages of construction, the pods were later completely redesigned to power tractor propellers. The engines had a water recovery system which captured water from exhaust of the engines to replace ballast jettisoned during flight.

To reduce drag, the passenger rooms were contained entirely within the hull, rather than in the gondola as on the LZ 127 Graf Zeppelin, on two decks. The upper deck, "A", contained the passenger quarters, public areas, a dining room, a lounge, and a writing room. The lower deck, "B", contained washrooms, a mess hall for the crew, and a smoking lounge. Long slanted windows ran the length of both decks. The passenger decks were redesigned for Graf Zeppelin; the restaurant was moved to the middle of the quarters and the promenade windows were half a panel lower.

=== Lift gas ===
Hindenburg was originally designed for helium, heavier than hydrogen but nonflammable. In the 1920s the United States possessed a monopoly on the production of helium, obtained as a byproduct of natural gas production. The U.S. Congress banned its export under the Helium Act of 1925 in an effort to conserve helium for use in U.S. Navy airships. Eckener expected this ban to be lifted, but to save helium the design was modified to have double gas cells (an inner hydrogen cell protected by an outer helium cell). The ban remained however, so the engineers used only hydrogen despite its extreme flammability. It held 200,000 cubic metres (7,062,000 cu ft) of gas in 16 bags or cells with a useful lift of approximately 232 t (511,000 lb). This provided a margin above the 215 t (474,000 lb) average gross weight of the ship with fuel, equipment, 10,000 kg (22,000 lb) of mail and cargo, about 90 passengers and crew and their luggage.

The Germans had extensive experience with hydrogen as a lifting gas. Accidental hydrogen fires had never occurred on civilian Zeppelins, so the switch from helium to hydrogen did not cause much concern. Hydrogen also increased lift by about 8%. After the Hindenburg disaster Eckener vowed to never use hydrogen again in a passenger airship. He planned to use helium for the second ship and went to Washington, D.C., to personally lobby President Roosevelt, who promised to supply the helium only for peaceful purposes. After Germany annexed Austria in March 1938, U.S. Secretary of the Interior Harold L. Ickes refused to supply the gas, and the Graf Zeppelin II was also filled with hydrogen.

== Operational history ==
=== LZ 129 Hindenburg ===
Hindenburg made her first flight on March 4, 1936, but before commencing its intended role as a passenger liner, was put to use for propaganda purposes by the Nazi government. Together with LZ 127 Graf Zeppelin, it spent four days dropping leaflets, playing music, and making radio broadcasts in the lead up to the March 29 plebiscite mandating Hitler's Chancellorship and remilitarization of the Rhineland.

Commercial services commenced on March 31, 1936 with the first of seven round trips to Rio de Janeiro that Hindenburg was to make during her first passenger season. Together with ten round trips to New York City, Hindenburg covered 308,323 km (191,583 mi) that year with 2,798 passengers and 160 tons of freight and mail.

Following refurbishment during the winter, Hindenburg set out on her first flight to North America for the 1937 season (she had already made one return trip to South America in 1937) on May 3, bound for New York. This flight would end in tragedy with Hindenburg being utterly consumed by fire as it prepared to dock at NAS Lakehurst in New Jersey.

=== LZ 130 Graf Zeppelin II ===
By the time the Graf Zeppelin II was completed, it was obvious that the ship would never serve its intended purpose as a passenger liner; the lack of a supply of inert helium was one cause. The ship was christened and made her first flight on September 14, 1938, making a circuit from Friedrichshafen to München, Augsburg, Ulm, and back. The total distance covered was 925 km (575 mi). The Graf Zeppelin II made a total of thirty flights, mainly spy missions for the Luftwaffe.

=== Scrapping ===
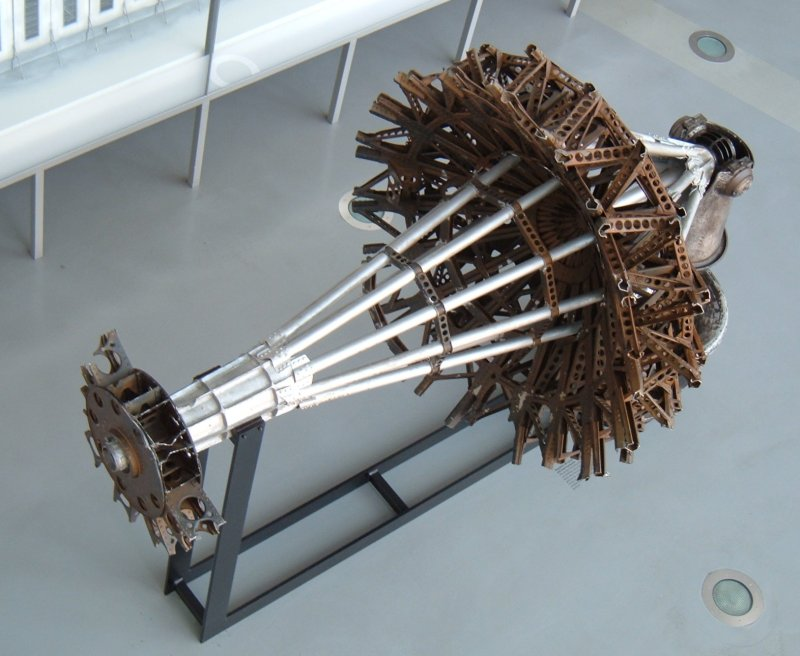
The nose of LZ 130 in the Zeppelin Museum Friedrichshafen

In April 1940, Hermann Göring issued the order to scrap both Graf Zeppelins and the unfinished framework of LZ 131, since the metal was needed for the construction of airplanes. By April 27, work crews had finished cutting up the airships. On May 6, the enormous airship hangars in Frankfurt were leveled by explosives, three years to the day after the destruction of the Hindenburg.

== Specifications ==
Hindenburg-class airships were three times as long and twice as tall as a Boeing 747.

General characteristics

- Crew: ca. 40
- Capacity: ca. 50 passengers for LZ-129 (later upgraded to 72), 40 passengers for LZ-130
- Length: 245.3 m (803 ft 10 in)
- Diameter: 41.2 m (135 ft 0 in)
- Volume: 200,000 m^{3} (7,100,000 cu ft)
- Useful lift: 232,000 kg (511,000 lb)
- Powerplant: 4 × Daimler-Benz DB 602 16-cylinder diesel engines , 735 kW (1,100 hp) each

Performance

- Maximum speed: 131 km/h (81 mph, 70 kn)

== See also ==
- Harold G. Dick
- List of Zeppelins

== Bibliography ==
- Sammt, Albert. 1988. Mein Leben für den Zeppelin, Verlag Pestalozzi Kinderdorf Wahlwies 1988, ISBN 3-921583-02-0 - pages 167-168 extract covering LZ 130's spying trip from 2 to 4 August 1939, (German) (pdf)
- Robinson, Douglas H. and Keller, Charles L. 1982. "Up Ship!:" A History of the U.S. Navy's Rigid Airships 1919-1935, Naval Institute Press, ISBN 0-87021-738-0
- de Syon, Guillaume. 2002. Zeppelin!: Germany and the Airship, 1900-1939, Johns Hopkins University Press, ISBN 0-8018-8634-1
- Vaeth, J. Gordon. 1958. Graf Zeppelin: The Adventures of an Aerial Globetrotter, Harper & Brothers
- Daniels, Dan. Hindenburg Design and Technology. Airships.net.
- Daniels, Dan. Hindenburg Flight Operations and Procedures. Airships.net.
- Hindenburg. Encyclopædia Britannica.
- Zeppelin Museum Friedrichshafen.
