= Albert Sammt =

Albert Sammt (24 April 1889 in Niederstetten – 21 June 1982 in Niederstetten) was a German commander of Zeppelin-airships.

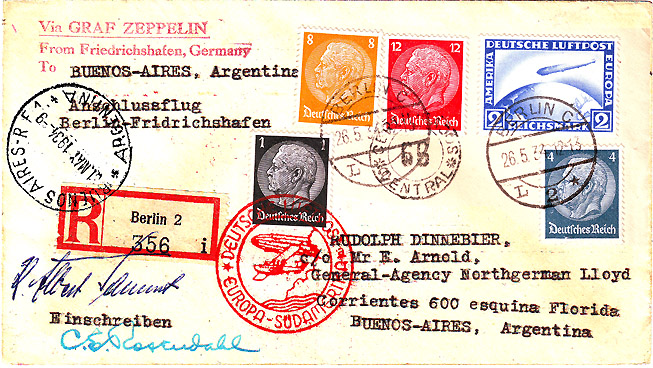
German Air Mail cover (Berlin-Buenos Aires via D-LZ127 Graf Zeppelin (1934) autographed by Capt. Albert Sammt

In 1919, he was helmsman on the LZ 120 Bodensee. He was the elevator helmsman (Höhensteuermann) of the Zeppelin LZ 126 - USS Los Angeles on its transatlantic flight in 1924.

Sammt was the first officer on the May, 1937 flight from Germany to Lakehurst, NJ of the LZ 129 Hindenburg which ended with the Hindenburg disaster during which he was seriously burned.

After the disaster, Sammt became the commander of the LZ 130 Graf Zeppelin, flying its spy flight in August 1939 and its last flight before it was dismantled. His home town of Niederstetten made him an "honoured citizen" (Ehrenbürger); the Albert-Sammt-Museum is situated there.
