= Paul Schulte (disambiguation) =

Paul Schulte (1896–1975) was a German priest and missionary.

Paul Schulte may also refer to:

- Paul Clarence Schulte (1890–1984), American Roman Catholic archbishop of Indianapolis
- Paul Schulte (basketball), Paralympic basketball player
