= Daimler-Benz DB 602 =

1930s German piston airship engine

DB 602
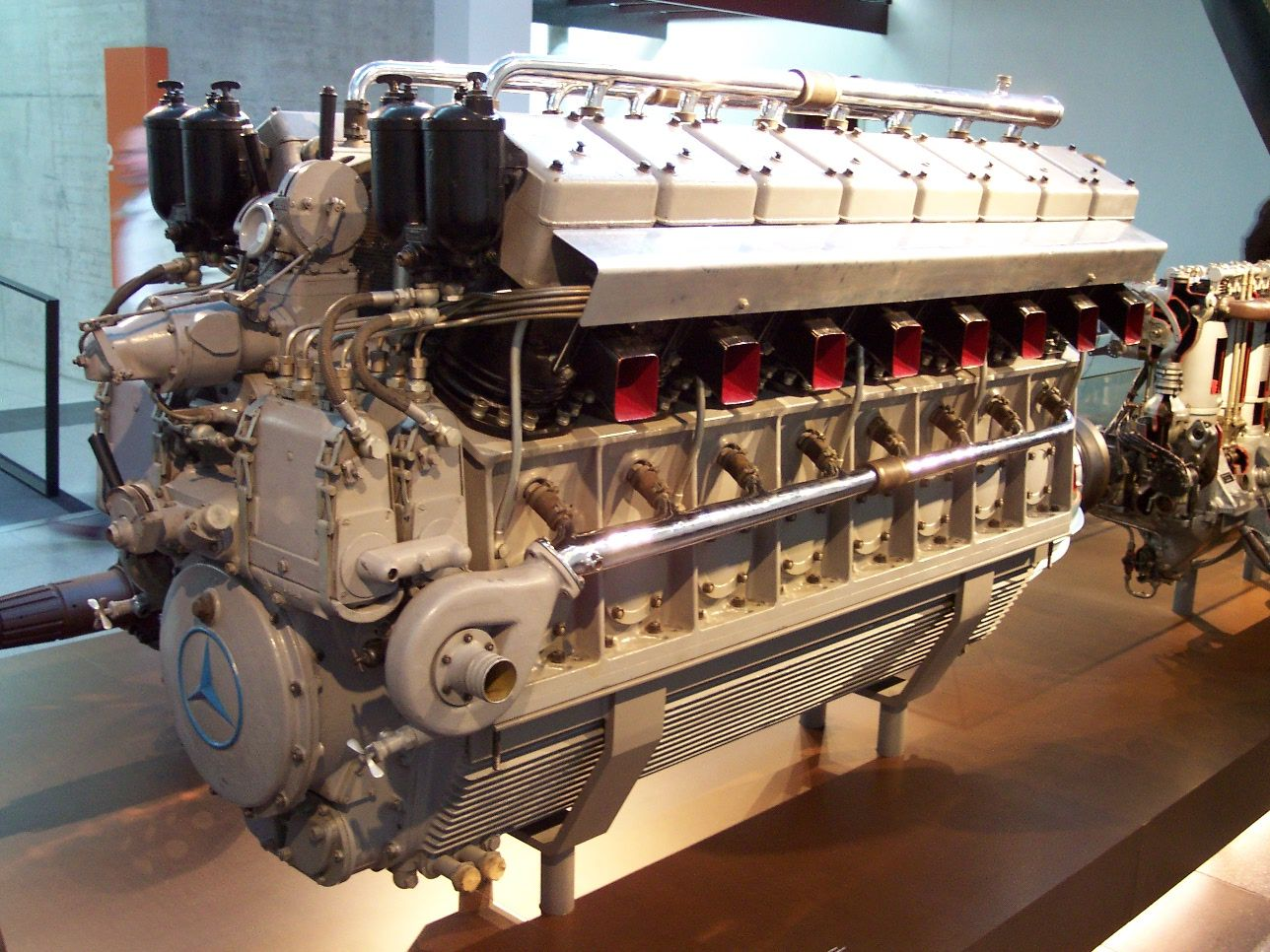
- Preserved Daimler-Benz DB 602
- Type: Diesel V16 aero engine
- National origin: Germany
- Manufacturer: Daimler-Benz
- First run: 1933
- Major applications: LZ 129 Hindenburg; LZ 130 Graf Zeppelin II; Schnellboot 1933 series S10...13

The Daimler-Benz DB 602, originally known as Daimler-Benz LOF.6, was a German diesel cycle aero engine designed and built in the early 1930s. It was a liquid-cooled upright V16, and powered the two Hindenburg-class airships. It has roughly the same displacement and weight of the Beardmore Tornado, which was used in the ill-fated R101, but has almost twice the power of the Tornado, showing Daimler-Benz's superior knowledge regarding diesel engine construction.

Also, these engines, under designation MB 502, powered four Schnellboot-type attack craft of 1933 series S10...13 (three engines on each). The engine was modified into V20 MB 501 of 2000 hp that had a variety of applications.

== Applications ==
=== DB 602 ===
- LZ 129 Hindenburg
- LZ 130 Graf Zeppelin II

=== MB 511 ===
- Schnellboot 1933 series S10...13

== Engines on display ==
A preserved Daimler-Benz DB 602 is on display at the Zeppelin Museum Friedrichshafen.

== Specifications (DB 602) ==
Data from Flugzeug-Typenbuch. Handbuch der deutschen Luftfahrt- und Zubehör-Industrie 1944

=== General characteristics ===
- Type: 16-cylinder liquid-cooled 50° V16 aircraft diesel engine
- Bore: 175 mm (6.89 in)
- Stroke: 230 mm (9.06 in)
- Displacement: 88.5 L (5,400.6 cu in)
- Length: 1,722 mm (67.8 in)
- Width: 739 mm (29.1 in)
- Height: 1,027 mm (40.4 in)
- Dry weight: 1,976 kg (4,356 lb) dry, unequipped

=== Components ===
- Valvetrain: Two intake and two exhaust valves per cylinder actuated via a single overhead camshaft per bank
- Fuel system: pre-combustion chamber injection
- Fuel type: Gas oil
- Oil system: pressure feed with scavenge
- Cooling system: Liquid-cooled

=== Performance ===
- Power output:

- 1,115 PS (1,100 hp; 820 kW) at 1,650 rpm (maximum) at sea level
- 1,000 PS (986 hp; 735 kW) at 1,450 rpm (5 minutes) at sea level
- 850 PS (838 hp; 625 kW) at 1,350 rpm (max continuous) at sea level

- Specific power: 11.3 PS/L (0.18 hp/cu in; 8.31 kW/L)
- Compression ratio: 16:1
- Specific fuel consumption: 0.175 kg/PSh (0.391 lb/(hp⋅h); 0.238 kg/kWh) at max continuous
- Oil consumption: 0.008 kg/PSh (0.018 lb/(hp⋅h); 0.011 kg/kWh) at max continuous
- Power-to-weight ratio: 0.485 PS/kg (0.217 hp/lb; 0.357 kW/kg)
- B.M.E.P.: 6.4 atm (6.5 bar; 94 psi)
- Reduction gear planetary, 0.5:1

== See also ==
Related lists

- List of aircraft engines
