= Hans von Schiller =

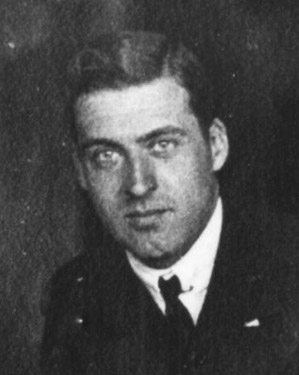

Hans von Schiller was famous for over twenty years as an airship Zeppelin crew member and captain. Born in 1891 in Schleswig-Holstein, the young Hans von Schiller joined the navy at the beginning of World War I. He volunteered for Zeppelin service and was active on numerous Zeppelin raids against the British from a base at Tonder (now in Denmark) - today the site of a Zeppelin museum.

After the war, von Schiller continued his career to become a world pioneer in international air travel. He was on board Zeppelins for flights to the Arctic and even a journey to circumnavigate the world. He captained innumerable flights to the US and South America (from Germany) until the Hindenburg disaster in 1937 brought an end to this form of travel. It was only because of a delay in Rio that he was unable to reach Friedrichshafen to join the last flight of the Hindenburg.

Von Schiller commanded the early flights of the LZ 130 Graf Zeppelin II before leaving the Zeppelin Company to serve as commander of the air base at Cologne in 1939 (Flight magazine 1939). Major Von Schiller and his family survived the onslaught of the thousand bomber raids on Cologne, and he was later transferred from the Commander at Butzweilerhof air base to be in charge of the Norwegian air-sea rescue group (Seenotdienstführer 5), promoted to the Luftwaffe rank of Oberstleutnant (lieutenant colonel).

At war’s end, he returned to Cologne to help clear the Rhine, and by 1948 he was made head of the Rhine ports for Cologne.

Von Schiller went on to author several books on Zeppelin flight. He eventually went into retirement and lived near Stuttgart until his death in 1976, survived by two of his three children. His ashes are scattered in the Airship pioneers section of the Cemetery in Friedrichshafen.
