= LZ 130 Graf Zeppelin =

German rigid airship (1938–1940)

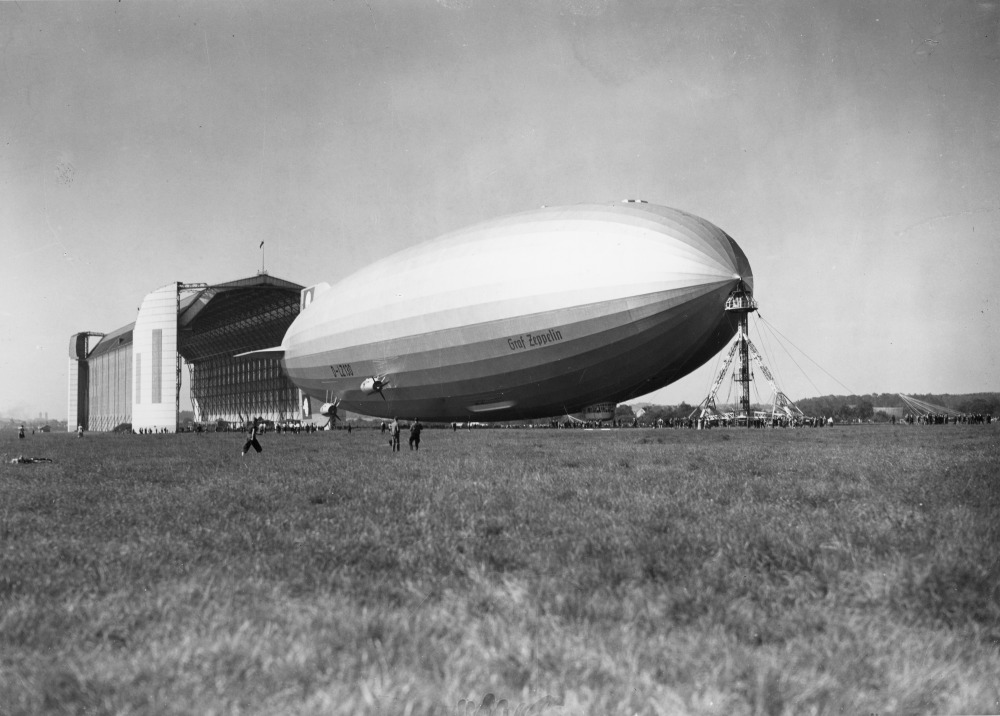
- Graf Zeppelin at Lowenthal Hangar in 1938

General information
- Other names: Graf Zeppelin II, Graf Zeppelin 2
- Type: Hindenburg-class airship
- Manufacturer: Luftschiffbau Zeppelin
- Construction number: LZ 130
- Registration: D-LZ130
- Flights: 30

History
- Manufactured: 1936–38
- First flight: 14 September 1938
- In service: 1938–1940
- Preserved at: Zeppelin Museum Friedrichshafen (bow)
- Fate: Dismantled in April 1940

LZ 130 Graf Zeppelin (Deutsches Luftschiff Zeppelin #130; Registration: D-LZ 130) was the last of the German rigid airships built by Zeppelin Luftschiffbau during the period between the World Wars, the second and final ship of the Hindenburg class, and the second zeppelin to carry the name "Graf Zeppelin" (after the LZ 127) and thus often referred to as Graf Zeppelin II. Due to the United States' refusal to export helium to Germany, Graf Zeppelin II was inflated with hydrogen and therefore never carried commercial passengers. It made 30 flights over 11 months in 1938–39, many being propaganda publicity flights; staff of the Reich Air Ministry were aboard to conduct radio surveillance and measurements. The airship, along with LZ 127 were both scrapped in April 1940, and their duralumin framework salvaged to build aircraft for the Luftwaffe.

== Design and development ==
Graf Zeppelin II was virtually identical to Hindenburg, and was originally designed to use hydrogen as lifting gas. The LZ 130 was built to replace the aging LZ 127 Graf Zeppelin on the South American transatlantic route while Hindenburg would continue flying the North American route. Following the Hindenburg disaster in May 1937, Dr Hugo Eckener vowed never again to use hydrogen in a passenger airship. This led to modifications so that Graf Zeppelin II could be inflated with helium. The only source of helium in large enough quantities at that time was the United States, so Eckener traveled to Washington, D.C. to lobby for helium for his airships. He visited President Franklin D. Roosevelt, who promised to supply helium, but only for peaceful purposes. After the German annexation of Austria in March 1938, U.S. Secretary of the Interior Harold Ickes refused to supply helium, and Graf Zeppelin II was ultimately inflated with hydrogen.

Though the LZ 130 was nearly identical in design to the LZ 129, there were a few minor improvements. The tail fins were 60 cm (24 in) shorter and the number of intermediate ribs was reduced to save weight and reduce stress on the trailing edge of the fin. As the ship was designed for hydrogen, there would be additional "luxury cabins" with windows on the starboard side allowing for a total of 70 passengers (this was added to Hindenburg over the winter of 1936–1937). The lower fin had an upward curve similar to Hindenburg's final configuration (repairs made after a tailstrike incident during the propaganda flight on March 26, 1936), giving more ground clearance.

To further reduce weight, the girder shape and riveting were changed slightly. The four engine cars were initially designed and installed to have the same pusher configuration as Hindenburg; after the Hindenburg disaster, they were completely redesigned, using the same DB-602 diesel engines powering tractor propellers. The new gondolas were slightly larger to accommodate the new exhaust water recovery system and were better insulated than those on Hindenburg, with engine noise noticeably reduced. The water recovery system condensed the water vapor in the engine exhaust and stored them which compensated for the weight of fuel consumed during flight and eliminated the need to vent any lifting gas.

In later flights, the airship used variable-pitch three-bladed propellers on both rear engines; trials were run on the forward port engine car as the ship neared completion, but only the aft-port engine car had a three-bladed propeller on its first flight. Unlike the wooden propellers of Hindenburg, which had problems with moisture absorption causing imbalance, these three-bladed propellers were made of plastic wood and individual blades were assembled onto a main hub.

The 16 gas cells were lightened and one was made of lightweight silk instead of cotton. On the bow near the nose cone there were just two windows, as in Hindenburg's original design (more windows were later fitted to Hindenburg after test flights.). The German investigation on the Hindenburg disaster suggested the poor conductivity of Hindenburg's outer skin played a role in the ignition of hydrogen. As a result, the cords connecting the panels were treated with graphite to increase the outer covering's electrical conductivity. Other redesigns included the gas vent hoods, gondola windows and the landing wheel design.

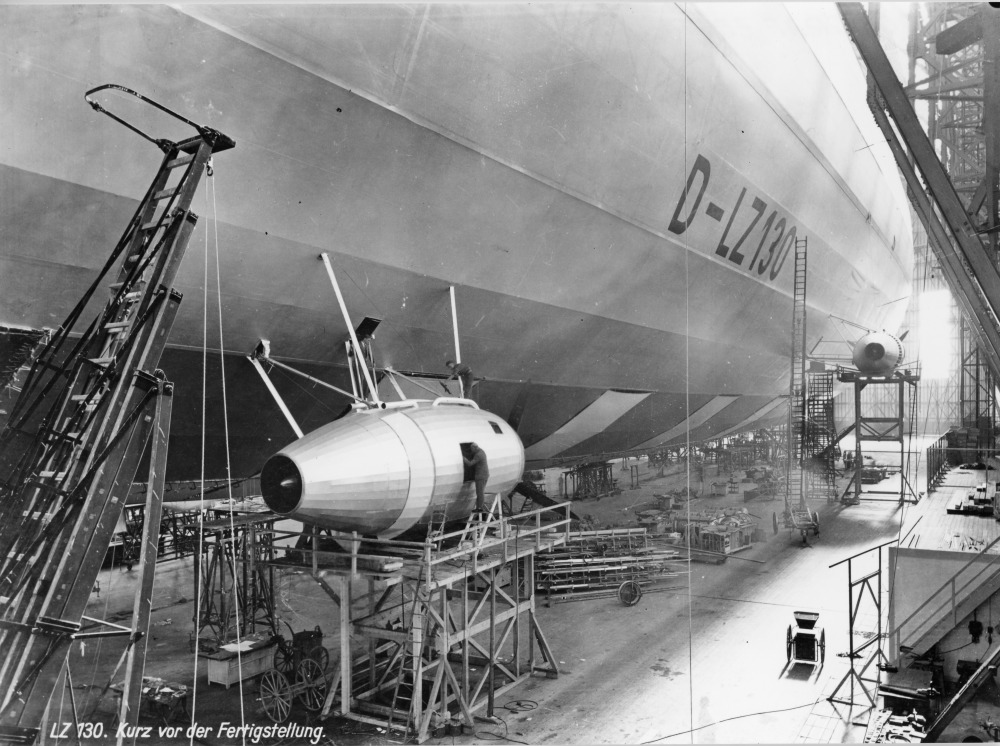
LZ 130 under construction with tractor-type engine cars installed

The interior of Graf Zeppelin II was markedly different from Hindenburg; the passenger decks were completely redesigned to accommodate 40 passengers, compared to Hindenburg's 72. Viewed externally, the promenade windows were half a longitudinal panel lower compared to Hindenburg. The twenty cabins were more spacious and had better lighting compared to those of Hindenburg; thirteen of them had windows, and four of them were "luxury cabins" on the upper "B" deck. Instead of two passenger decks, Graf Zeppelin II had one and a half, divided into four sections. The "A" deck consisted of the dining room along the central rear section of the passenger quarters, slightly elevated from the "B" deck running along the upper promenade windows, which contained lounges, smoking room and the luxury cabins. Sixteen passenger cabins as well as the galley and passenger lavatories were located in Deck "C". Deck "D", at the rear of the lower deck, contained the officer's mess, crew's mess and lavatories, as well as the radio and electrical rooms.

=== Construction timeline ===
23 June 1936 – The keel of the airship was laid and the main rings were fastened onto the roof of the hangar. Although the first few rings were assembled within the hangar, a separate ring assembly shed was completed soon after, and rings were constructed and transported from the shed to the hangar using tracks on the field.

14 February 1937 – The nose cone was installed. In the same month, the fabric was also applied over the framework.

6 May 1937 – The LZ 129 Hindenburg bursts into flames and crashes while landing at Lakehurst, New Jersey, killing 35 out of 97 people on board and one member of the US Navy ground crew. Although the LZ 130 had intended to be launched later in the year with a passenger flight route to Rio de Janeiro on 27 October, the plan was cancelled after the loss of Hindenburg and prompted several alterations of the LZ 130, such that its construction would be further delayed.

November 1937 – Chief designer Ludwig Dürr proposes a redesign of the engine car gondolas to tractor configuration for better efficiency, so that both sides of the gondola can act as radiators. Wind tunnel tests in October showed a significant decline in propeller performance of the original engine cars with the water recovery system taken into account.

15 August 1938 – Inflation began on gas cells.

20 August 1938 – Engines and electrical connections are tested.

22 August 1938 – The radio communication system is tested.

14 September 1938 – The ship was christened and flew the first time. Only Zeppelin Company officials and Hermann Göring were present; no other government representatives came to the christening to congratulate Eckener, and he made the speech himself.

Although a banner with the name Graf Zeppelin 2 (with Arabic numeral) was hung on the wall of the construction shed during the airship's assembly, the LZ 130 itself never bore an additional numeral, since the original Graf Zeppelin (LZ 127) had been retired.

By the time Graf Zeppelin was completed, it was obvious that the ship would never serve its intended purpose as a passenger liner; the lack of a supply of helium was one cause. The Reich Air Ministry permitted Graf Zeppelin to fly "for one year until 1 September 1939 without any transportation of passengers and outside of tropical areas". Dr Ernst Breuning, who was responsible for radio development for the RLM, negotiated with the Zeppelin company to have the airship used as a laboratory for radio surveillance and measurements. As a result, the passenger accommodations were modified to contain radio and measuring instruments. Part of the cover was to have the airship make public appearances at air shows ("Flying Days") and deliver mail. In addition to Breuning's group of radio engineers (termed "Group R") who boarded posing as civilian passengers, there were also a team of physicists from the Drahtlostelegraphische und Luftelektrische Versuchsstation Gräfelfing (DVG) led by Max Dieckmann, whose intention was to study meteorological conditions and the role of electrostatic discharge in the Hindenburg disaster.

== Operational history ==
In total, Graf Zeppelin made thirty flights, covering 36,550 km (22,710 mi) in a flight time of 409 hours:

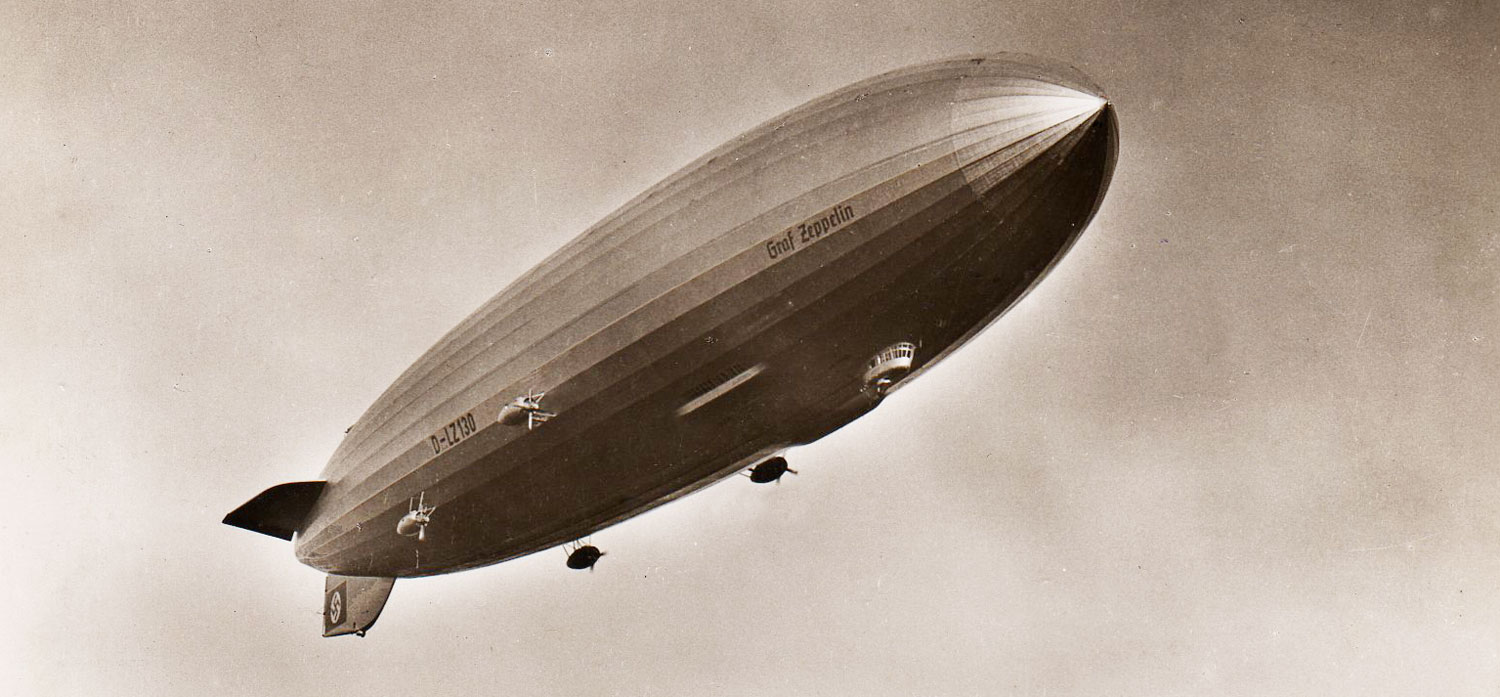
Graf Zeppelin in flight

=== Flights 1 to 7 ===
1. 14 September 1938 – The maiden voyage took place immediately after the christening of the ship under the command of Eckener. The ship took off from Friedrichshafen at 7.50 AM with 74 people, mainly Air Ministry and Zeppelin Company officials, on board. Also on board were the builders, technicians and RLM radio engineers. The engines were only started after the airship reached a height of approximately 100 m (330 ft). Graf Zeppelin flew across Munich, Augsburg and Ulm, landing at the Löwenthal hangar at 1.30 PM, having flown a total of 925 km (575 mi). Eckener described the trip as "satisfying" and "successful."

2. 17–18 September 1938 – The second trip was a 26-hour test trip under the command of Eckener and Captain Hans von Schiller with a total of 85 people on board. It started at 8.08 AM on 17 September 1938. The morning was spent over the Bodensee with different measurements being taken. At noon it flew north, reaching Stuttgart at 12.15 and Frankfurt am Main at 13.15, and then flew towards Eisenach and Eisleben. Towards evening Berlin was reached. After many circuits at low altitude it started towards Hamburg. Over the outer-Elbe-estuary in the Wadden Sea further calibrations and tests were made. Afterwards it flew a direct course over Minden towards Frankfurt am Main and then towards Bodensee. There the airship had to make a large circuit over Friedrichshafen, because the airfield was obscured by fog. It landed at 10.17 after covering 2,388 km (1,484 mi) and shortly before 11 o'clock was brought back into the Löwenthaler hangar.

3. 22 September 1938 – The third trial flight, starting at 8.13 and ending at 19.30, was a 1,215 km (755 mi) circuit over Munich and Vienna. Although it was officially a demonstration trial flight, the airship, escorted by four Messerschmitt Bf 109s disguised as civilian police aircraft, was flown over the Czech border for espionage purposes; some authors have deemed this to be unlikely, considering the speed difference between the two aircraft. This was the last time Eckener commanded an airship; he did not mention this flight in his memoirs.

4. 25 September 1938 – Started at about 11.00hrs under Captain Hans von Schiller, lasting about 7hr and covering about 764 km (475 mi), 40 crew members and 34 passengers and technicians). Tests at high altitude were made. Almost the whole trip took place at an altitude of about 2,000 m (6,600 ft) without needing to valve much gas. Further atmospheric electrical tests were made.

5. 27 September 1938 – eleven hours of trip duration, on behalf of the Reich Air Ministry (RLM) under the command of Captain Albert Sammt. At the airport and airship-port Rhein-Main a radio beacon was set up. The idea was to attempt a Funkbeschickung (a calibration of the direction-finding equipment). Hazy air hindered the attempts despite good weather conditions. The calibration did not succeed perfectly – these problems arose even at later attempts. There were also first successes with the Ballastwassergewinnungsanlage (a water recovery system to save ballast), such that no gas had to be valved except for about 600 cubic meters for weight off. Three and a half tonnes of ballast water could be saved and the engines ran quieter because of the sound-absorbing effect of the device.

6. 28 September 1938 – Further test flight on behalf of the RLM under Captain Sammt. Members of the DVG under the direction of Max Dieckmann were on board to investigate whether electrostatic charges caused the Hindenburg disaster. Therefore, it was especially flown during thunderstorms. Flights during normal weather conditions brought no useful results. The ship was flown into the stormfront slack (gas cells under-inflated), to prevent the pressure-relief valves venting hydrogen. The trip lasted nearly 26 hours, covering over 2,500 km (1,600 mi) The ballast water recovery system fulfilled the engineers' expectations, producing about nine tons of water.

7. 31 October 1938 – Launch at 14.17 under the command of Captain Sammt. This was the last inspection flight and also the transfer flight to Flug- und Luftschiffhafen Frankfurt am Main (the airship port at Frankfurt am Main). It landed at 15.10 on November 1 after nearly 25 hours in the air, having covered over 2,100 km (1,300 mi) . The airship and the crew were welcomed by Gauleiter Sprenger at the new home port. After this trip LZ 130 received its Luftschiff-Zulassungsschein (airship registration document), with the restriction that no carrying of passengers was permitted.

=== Flight 8 – Sudetenlandfahrt ===
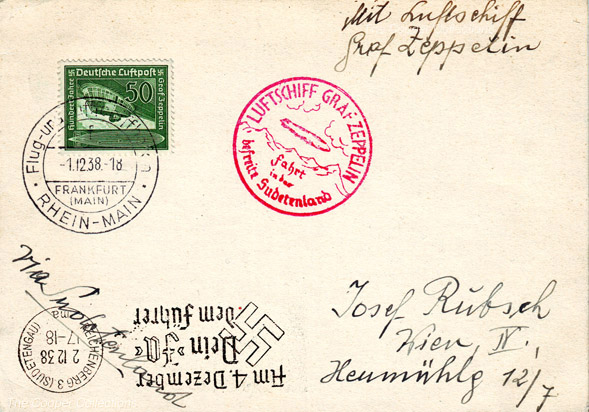
Postcard carried from Frankfurt (Rhein-Main) to Reichenberg (Sudetengau) on the "Sudetendeutsche Freiheitsfahrt 1938" on the first mail flight of the "Graf Zeppelin II" (DLZ130), December 1–2, 1938

8. “Sudetenlandfahrt” ("Sudetenland journey") also known as the Sudetendeutsche Freiheitsfahrt 1938, was made at the behest of the Reich Ministry for Public Enlightenment and Propaganda (Reichsministerium für Volksaufklärung und Propaganda or Propagandaministerium). After the popular vote resulted in a large majority for Hitler and the National Socialist Party many propaganda channels were used – including a Zeppelin flight over the befreiten Gebiete ("liberated regions"). On board were 62 crew members and 7 passengers, among them military officers. Taking off on 2 December 1938, LZ130 arrived over Reichenberg (present-day Liberec), capital of Sudetenland (a German-speaking area in Czechoslovakia), timed to match Hitler's visit. Small parachutes were thrown out with swastika flags and handbills carrying the text "Dein JA dem Führer!" ("Your YES for the leader"). LZ 130's loudspeakers played music and National Socialist propaganda for the forthcoming December 4 elections. Afterwards LZ 130 flew to the Reichenberg airfield and dropped 663 kg of postally cacheted souvenir mails. Worsening weather hindered further flight, and after some time it was decided to turn back. After the ship left the Sudetenland, it came into low cloud and snow showers. It started to ice up. Later, the propellers blew broken-off ice shards through the ship's outer envelope. However, the crew immediately repaired the damage. The Zeppelin landed without problem in gusty winds at 17:46 and was brought into the airship hangar.

=== Flights 9 to 23 ===
Owing to poor weather conditions, the ship only made two flights in early 1939.

9. 13 January 1939 launched at 9.08, commanded by Captain Sammt, different tests were performed. Duration: 7 hours and covering 523 km (325 mi)

10. 13 April 1939 Among other things, radio- and spy basket tests were performed. The airship's framework caused spurious reflections of radio signals, so a spy basket or "cloud car" was installed in the hull with radio equipment. This could be lowered on a steel cable below the cloud layer. Over Stettin, DVG engineer Seiler fell overboard when his parachute deployed after the release switch got caught. He received a minor skull fracture and a broken collar bone when he struck the tail of the cloud car while falling. In a flight lasting approximately 30 hours it covered nearly 2,700 km (1,700 mi).

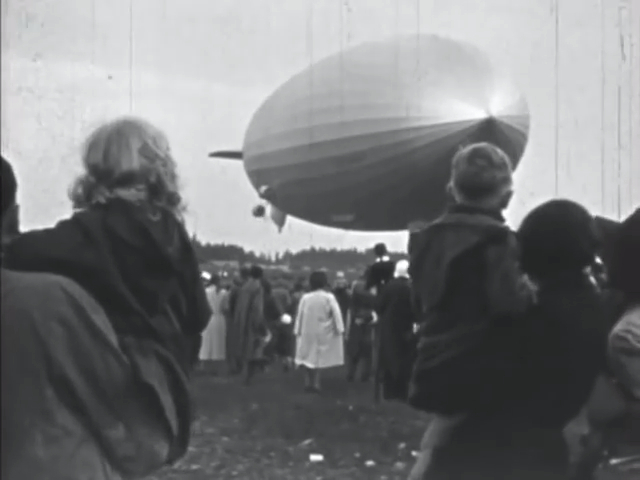
Graf Zeppelin in 1939

11. 15 June 1939 Duration: 28-hour flight for further measurements, covering 2,800 km. The ship flew over Cologne, Hamburg, Berlin, Leipzig and Bad Neustadt an der Saale before returning to Frankfurt at 6:18 pm on 16 June.

12. and 13. Meiningenfahrt 2 July 1939; 18.40 landing at Meiningen airfield, flew back to Frankfurt am Main at 19.22.

14. and 15. Leipzigfahrt (Leipzig trip) 9 July 1939; among other things landing in Leipzig-Mockau airfield with post office delivery

16. Nordseefahrt (North Sea trip) 12 to 14 July 1939. Launch: 22.25; 45-hour spy mission over the North Sea. General Wolfgang Martini, head of the Luftwaffe signals organisation, wanted to find out whether Britain possessed a workable radar system for detecting aircraft. He suspected that the 110 m (350 ft) masts of the then-secret Chain Home system were part of such a system, so he obtained permission for Graf Zeppelin to be equipped to investigate this. New high-frequency receivers were installed, and an aerial array rigged underneath the gondola. With General Martini on board, the flight set course for RAF Bawdsey research station and then turned north and flew parallel to the British east coast. Nothing was detected by Graf Zeppelin, but the airship was detected by Chain Home. Over the Humber Estuary the airship transmitted a position report stating it was off the coast of Yorkshire. The airship then turned for home.

17. and 18. Görlitzfahrt (Görlitz trip) launch: 16 July 1939 00:34 under Captain Sammt. An intermediate stop was made in Görlitz, which the LZ 127 Graf Zeppelin had previously visited on October 5, 1930. After a quick mail drop and exchange of goods, the ship took off within two minutes of landing because of bad weather in the vicinity. Several personnel at the landing site, including Captain Heinrich Bauer, were unable to board the ship as previously planned.

19. 20., and 21. Bielefeld-Münster-Fahrt (Bielefeld-Münster trip): 23 July 1939. The airship first flew over Nürburgring, where the 1939 German Grand Prix was taking place. It remained there during 5 laps and broadcast a radio commentary before landing at the Flying Day events at Bielefield and Münster later that day.

22. and 23.:To Kassel: 30 July 1939, commanded by Captain Anton Wittemann. This 7-hour flight covered 600 km (370 mi), flying over the air show events at both Frankfurt (at the old Rebstock airport) and in Kassel where it made a short stop-over.

=== Flight 24 – Espionage ===
24. The "espionage trip" of 2 to 4 August 1939, taking over 48 hours and covering 4,203 km (2,612 mi), was the longest trip the LZ 130 made. The main goal was to secretly collect information on the British Chain Home radar system. To do this the airship flew northwards close to the British east coast to the Shetland Isles and back. As well as the 45 crew, 28 personnel engaged in the measurements were carried. Lifting off was around 20:53 on 2 August 1939; it overflew Hildesheim at 23:38, seen by very few people.

According to the memoirs of Albert Sammt, Mein Leben für den Zeppelin (translation: "My life for the zeppelin") in the chapter Mit LZ 130 Graf Zeppelin auf Funkhorch- und Funkortungsfahrt ("with the LZ 130 Graf Zeppelin on the radio-listening and radiolocation trip") written by Breuning, a radio-measuring spy basket was used. Sammt flew the LZ 130 up Britain's east coast stopping the engines at Aberdeen pretending they had engine failure in order to investigate strange antenna masts. They drifted freely westwards over land and according to Breuning, saw for the first time the new Supermarine Spitfires, which were then photographed as they circled the airship. As these photographs have not surfaced, this alleged encounter with Spitfires is not supported by contemporary news sources, which state that the LZ 130 was intercepted by two RAF planes dispatched from Dyce Airport, a Miles Magister carrying 612 Squadron Leader Finlay Crerar and Officer Robinson, and an Avro Anson.

The last sighting from the ground of Graf Zeppelin was by the lighthouse keeper of Girdle Ness Lighthouse who was surprised to see the airship overhead at below 1,000 feet. Graf Zeppelin cruised on up to the Scapa Flow naval base, catching glimpses of British warships through the clouds. In the early evening, Graf Zeppelin turned back to Germany without having detected any Chain Home radar transmissions. After a Daily Telegraph report of the flight, a German communiqué was issued on 4 August stating: "The airship cannot leave Germany without special permission. There can be no question of an intention to fly over near British territory. There have, however, been severe storms during the last day or two and it is possible that the airship could have been blown off her course over the North Sea."

On their return journey, as they neared Frankfurt on the evening of 4 August they were warned by radio that landing was not yet possible. At first they suspected an aeroplane had crashed at the site, but on overflying saw nothing amiss. They turned and flew towards the Rhön Mountains and on asking, were informed "landing before dusk not possible". They decided to return to Frankfurt and speak directly with the landing team (Landemannschaft) using their very high frequency transmitter, so that they would not be overheard by the French and so that they could speak in Swabian German to Beurle, the landing team leader.

According to Breuning's account, Beurle informed them they must not land yet because the British had lodged a diplomatic protest over their actions and a British delegation was at the airfield, with agreement of the German government, to inspect the ship. They were under suspicion. Beurle told them to wait while they thought of something. Shortly, the LZ 130 received instructions. They were to hide all the equipment on the ship and not to land at the usual well-lit landing point where a landing team was waiting, but to land at the other end where the "real" landing team was waiting. Once they had landed there, the technicians were to get off and they would be replaced by a unit of Sturmabteilung. The British delegation waiting at the usual landing place were told that, due to the weather, the airship had to land at another part of the airfield. By the time the British reached the airship, the spy crew was on a bus on their way to their hotel. Although they searched the ship, the British found nothing suspicious on the ship nor in the decoy SA-crew. Breuning's account has been questioned; mechanic German Zettel asserted it was a normal landing and there is no official record of the British filing a diplomatic protest.

Breuning explained that the trip's results were negative, but not because the British radar was switched off, as Churchill wrote in his memoirs. Martini, who was the Chief of Signal Affairs of the Luftwaffe, used a strong, impulsive, broadband radio transmission for determining the "radio-weather", the best wavelengths to use for radio. These impulses severely disturbed their highly sensitive receivers in the 10–12 metre waveband. Breuning wrote that he repeatedly requested Martini to stop transmitting during the spy trips, to no avail. This made it impossible for the LZ 130 to investigate the very wavebands the British were using. An alternative account was given after the war by General Martini who had issued the orders for the espionage trip; he told British radar pioneer Edward Fennessy that German naval radar experiments were based on much higher frequency wavebands than the British were using, and that the scientists on board concluded that the signals which they were receiving were not connected with detection equipment.

=== Flights 25 to 30 ===
25. and 26. Würzburgfahrt (Würzburg trip) 6 August 1939

27. and 28. Egerfahrt (Cheb trip) 13 August 1939

29 and 30. The last trip, the so-called Essen/Mülheim-Fahrt (Essen/Mülheim trip), took place on 20 August 1939. The departure and destination was Frankfurt am Main with an intermediate stop at Essen/Mülheim Airport, commanded by Sammt. This trip (landing at 21:38) meant the end of large airship transport.

== The end of the Zeppelins ==
A flight to Königsberg was planned for 26 August 1939, but was cancelled. It had been decided by the Aviation Ministry that the airships were a potential hazard with the imminent war. On this day, the LZ 130 was removed from the hangar, turned around and re-entered the hangar in a position convenient for its eventual dismantling. By 1 September, the LZ 130 had its gas cells deflated, fuel drained from the engines and all electrical equipment removed. Until January 1940, several attempts were made by Eckener and the Zeppelin Company to mothball the airship so that it could be recommissioned after the war, but on 20 November 1939, a DZR Supervisory Board meeting decided that the two Graf Zeppelins would be scrapped and their hangars demolished. The DZR continued to appeal this decision but was unsuccessful.

On 29 February 1940, Göring issued the order to scrap both Graf Zeppelins and the unfinished framework of LZ 131, since the metal was needed to build airplanes. By 27 April, work crews had finished disassembling the airships and recycling all the materials. On 6 May, the enormous airship hangars in Frankfurt were levelled by explosives, three years to the day after the destruction of Hindenburg.

== In popular culture ==
Le film révélateur, episode 11 of season 2 of the French TV series Arsène Lupin aired in 1974, featured the titular character embarking on a fictionalized transatlantic passenger flight aboard LZ 130 Graf Zeppelin (in reality the ship never carried out commercial passenger flights).

The 1991 film The Rocketeer depicts a fictional version of LZ 130 with the name Luxembourg. The airship has a basic layout more similar to the Hindenburg (and LZ 130's initial design) with 4 pusher configuration engine cars and ends up bursting to flames and crashing like Hindenburg during the film's climax.

== Specifications (LZ129 Hindenburg class) ==
Note: The LZ130 Graf Zeppelin II was similar in most respects

Data from

General characteristics

- Crew: ca. 40
- Capacity: ca. 72 (later 40) passengers / 102,000 kg (224,872 lb) disposable load
- Length: 245 m (803 ft 10 in)
- Diameter: 41.2 m (135 ft 2 in)
- Volume: 200,000 m^{3} (7,100,000 cu ft) gas capacity
- Empty weight: 130,000 kg (286,601 lb)
- Fuel capacity: 65,000 kg (143,300 lb)
- Useful lift: 232,000 kg (511,000 lb) typical gross lift
- Powerplant: 4 × Daimler-Benz DB 602 (LOF-6) V-16 liquid-cooled diesel piston engines, 890 kW (1,200 hp) each

Performance

- Maximum speed: 135 km/h (84 mph, 73 kn)
- Range: 16,500 km (10,300 mi, 8,900 nmi) at 37.5 metres per second (135 km/h; 84 mph)

== See also ==
- Buoyancy compensator (aviation)

Related lists

- List of Zeppelins
