= Fritz August Breuhaus =

German architect and designer (1883–1960)

- Born: Fritz August Breuhaus
- Other name: Fritz August Breuhaus de Groot
- Occupation: Architect

Fritz August Breuhaus respectively Breuhaus de Groot (9 February 1883 – 2 December 1960) was a German architect, interior designer and designer active in the 20th century, primarily in Germany and Switzerland.

== Early life and education ==
Breuhaus was born on 9 February 1883 in Solingen, Germany, the older of two children, to Hans Hugo Breuhaus (born 1859), a dental technician, and Johanne Breuhaus (née Knipping; 1858–1928). In 1928, Breuhaus started to use the suffix de Groot to inherently make himself more important claiming to be a grandson respectively great-grandson of the reputable Dutch painter Frans Breuhaus de Groot (1824–1872). In reality there was no relation to the de Groot family.

His father tried to influence his career, encouraging him to study mechanical engineering, which he did. He also sat in on architecture lectures and took "Design" (Prof. Theodor Fischer mit Assistent Paul Bonatz), "Decorative design" (Prof. Gustav Halmhuber), "Watercolor painting" (Prof. Treidler). When his father found out, he refused to support him any further. Breuhaus was forced to live off a small inheritance from his grandmother.

== Professional career ==
From 1907, Breuhaus lived and worked in Düsseldorf, where he began the process of designing and planning for the “Garden City Meererbusch”. Breuhaus designed the first house on this 75-hectare (190-acre) residential area in Meerbusch, Buderich. He also live in “house Eichenhof” for part of the process. The houses were built mainly for businessmen and lawyers, but artists also resided there.

Breuhaus then served in World War I between 1914 and 1918. He achieved the rank of sergeant, serving in both France and the Eastern Front. He published a book in 1917 about his experienced named Der Soldat und der Tod. Gespräch in Versen.

After 1920, Breuhaus had just divorced from his first wife and returned from war. But his career had picked up momentum, even during the post-war slum (World War I). Breuhaus mostly designed houses and country houses for the upper class. But in 1923 he had also started his own company "Mikado-garages" which specialized in hand-printed textiles. He also designed furniture, lamps, silverware and wallpaper.

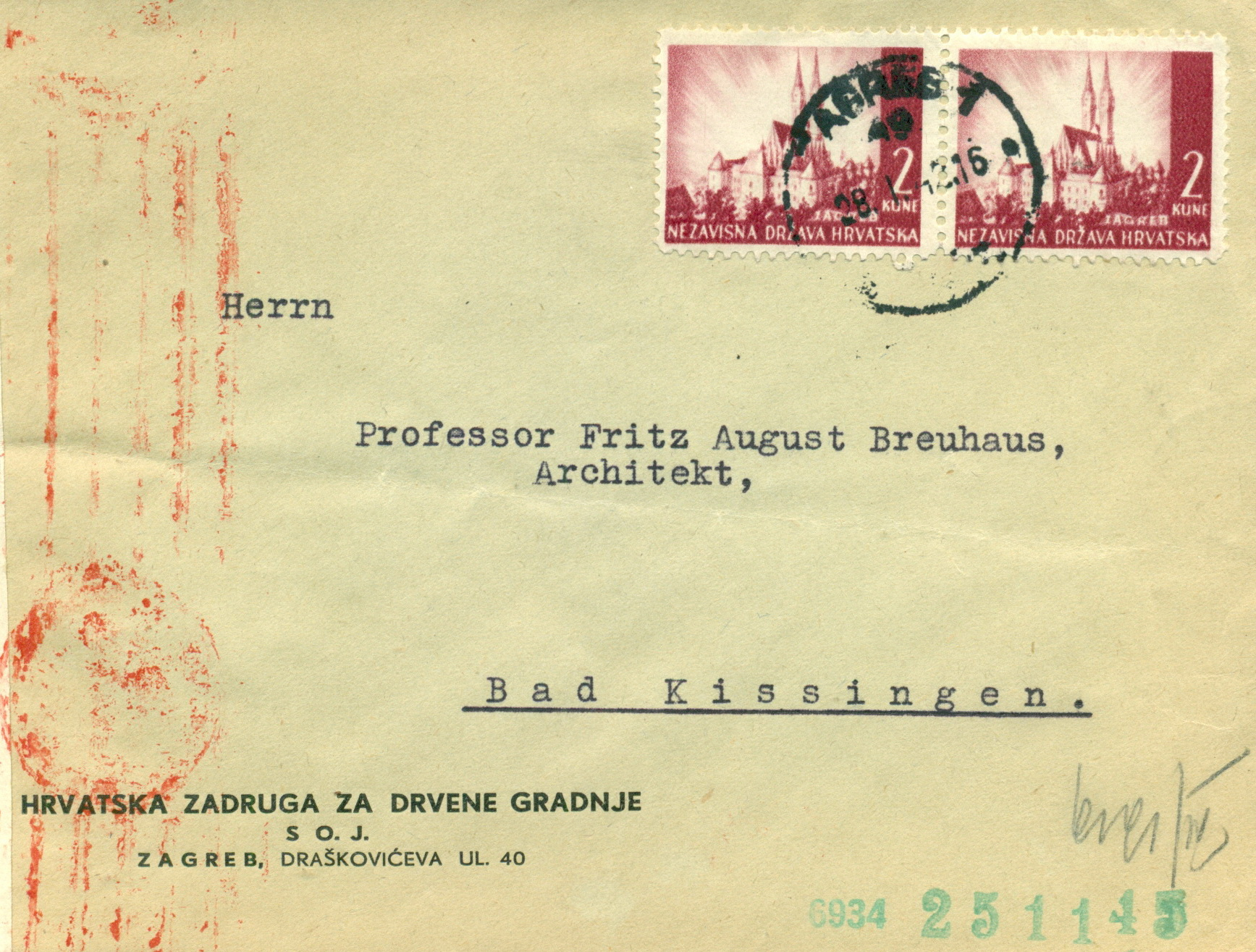
1942: Letter sent from Zagreb - NDH to Bad Kissingen for architect Fritz August Breuhaus

The next step in his career showed off his interior design skills. He worked on the interior of the Bremen luxury liner. But Breuhaus’s is most famous for the interiors of the Hindenburg passenger airship. He used lightweight tubular forms to create very social space, where people are expected to spend their time in the public space, instead of their cramped cabins. It was from these two projects that Breuhaus used to gain the title of Professor from the Free State of Bavaria. He wanted this title because he understood the promotional value of an academic title.

The ‘little island’, was the house he built for his family in Schmargendorf. The home was functional, simple and sophisticated, much like the rest of his post-war work. The building was surrounded by a courtyard on three sides. He had already designed 50 homes for clients, in which he custom-designed all the furniture.

== Death ==
Breuhaus died on 2 December 1960, aged 77, in Cologne. He continued working right up until his death. Architect Arthur Gerard completed any work left undone.

== Other work ==
- 1910 country house "Neugrünewald" with two gate lodges for the factory owner O. R. in Solingen (Rhineland), demolished except for gate lodges
- 1910 project for a residential complex in the "Villenkolonie Müngersdorf" in Cologne.
- 1913 castle for family von R. at the Baltic Sea.
- 1914 Werkbund exhibition 1914 in Cologne.
- 1920 interior design of his own flat in Cologne.
- 1921 castle for Countess von S. in Thuringia.
- 1934 summer house in timber construction on the exhibition "Deutsches Volk – Deutsche Arbeit" in Berlin.
- 1938 competition design for an administrative and studio district, so-called "UFA-Filmstadt" in (Potsdam-) Babelsberg.
- 1940 country house for count P. Y. in Berlin-Dahlem.
- 1950 country house "Zu den vier Winden" for the mining entrepreneur V. R. in Weiden near Cologne, demolished in 1970
- 1953 residence "Schwalbenhof" for the manufacturer Erich Kiefer in Gärtringen
- 1955 Protestant chapel in Glassworks (Taunus)
- 1960-1961- House for Udo Giulini in Heidelberg
