= Paul Schulte =

German Catholic priest and missionary (1896–1975)

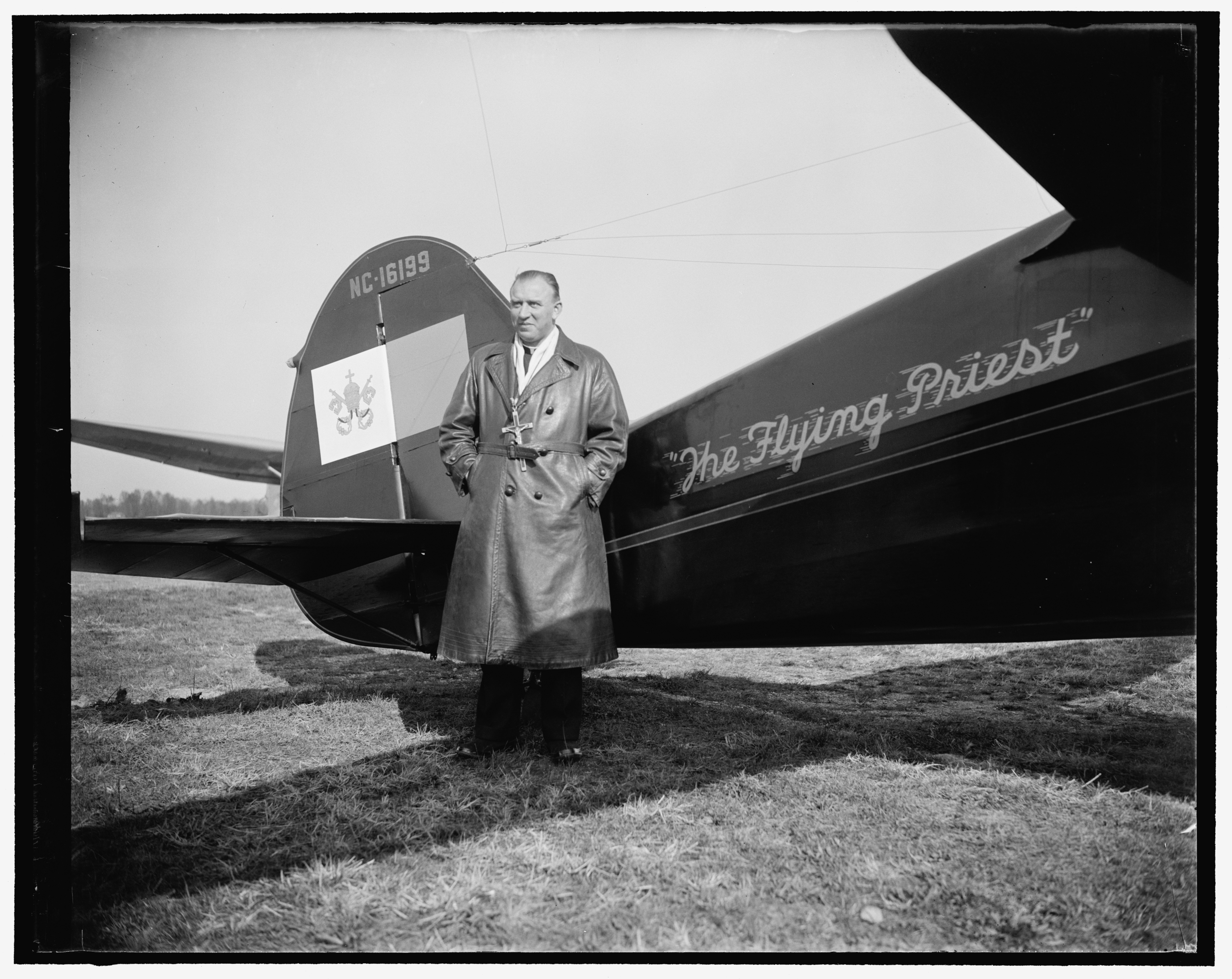
Paul Schulte, with aeroplane, in 1940

Paul Schulte OMI (1896 – 1975), was a German priest and missionary, known as the "Flying Priest", who founded MIVA ("Missionary International Vehicular Association") to provide automobiles, boats and airplanes for the service of missions throughout the world.

== Biography ==
Schulte's training for the priesthood was interrupted by the outbreak of World War I. He was conscripted and served in the Prussian 4th Guard Grenadier Regiment. After 2 1/2 years he was wounded. On his recovery he joined the Air Force to be trained as a pilot, and served in Palestine. Following the war he returned to his studies at the scholasticate in Hünfeld, and was ordained an Oblate Priest of the Missionary Oblates of Mary Immaculate in 1922. As a first obedience he was sent to South Africa as a missionary.

In 1925 his childhood friend and fellow soldier Father Otto Fuhrmann died in South-West Africa of pneumonia complicated by malaria. It had taken him five days to reach the hospital of the Protestant Finnish mission where he died. This led Fr. Schulte to found MIVA, the "Missionalium Vehiculorum Association", known in German as the "Missions-Verkehrs-Arbeitsgemeinschaft", and the "Missionary International Vehicular Association" in English, to provide training and modern vehicles for missionaries, especially in Africa, Asia and Latin America, with the motto Obviam Christo terra marique et in aera ("Toward Christ by land and sea and in the air"). Despite some opposition from his superiors he finally received the blessing of the Archbishop of Cologne. In 1929 Schulte made his first journey to the United States to raise funds. Finally the Pope himself gave his unqualified approval.

On May 8, 1936, Father Schulte flew to the US on the airship Hindenburg and with papal permission celebrated the world's first aerial Mass in memory of his brother Lieutenant Franz Schulte who had died of influenza in 1919 while a POW in Raikeswood POW camp, Skipton, West Riding, Yorkshire, England. While over Keighley he dropped a parcel containing a bunch of carnations, a small silver and jet crucifix, some postage stamps, a picture postcard and some Hindenburg notepaper. It was found by two Scouts, who placed the carnations on Franz Schulte's grave. The following day, another mass followed, specifically for the crew. By that time MIVA had bought a dozen aircraft, and more than 150 automobiles and motorboats, used by mission stations in Albania, Latvia, Africa, Madagascar, Korea, New Guinea, Brazil and the Solomon Islands.

Schulte was then assigned to a parish in Northern Canada. There, in August 1938, Schulte mounted a 2,200 mile medical evacuation on behalf of Father Julien Cochard from Arctic Bay, the most northerly Catholic mission in the world, to Chesterfield Inlet. In his Stinson Reliant floatplane Schulte flew through storm force winds and thick fog in order to rescue Cochard, and received a special blessing from Pope Pius XI for his services.

Schulte was transferred to St. Henry's Seminary in Belleville, Illinois during World War II where he helped found the National Shrine of Our Lady of the Snows. He continued his work with MIVA until his death in Swakopmund, Namibia, in 1975. He is buried beside his boyhood friend, Father Otto Fuhrmann.

In 2007 MIVA celebrated its 80th anniversary. It has branches all over Europe, the United States and Korea, and still raises money to provide everything from aircraft to horses.

== Publications ==
- The Flying Missionary, 1936
- The Flying Priest over the Arctic; a story of everlasting ice and of everlasting love, 1940
- The Flying Priest in Africa

== Films ==
- The Flying Cross - ca. 1937 A realistic exposition of the hardships endured by Catholic missionaries in the frozen wastes of the Arctic.
