= Harold G. Dick =

American mechanical engineer

Harold Gustav "Hal" Dick (January 19, 1907 – September 3, 1997) was an American mechanical engineer employed by Goodyear, who flew on almost all of the Hindenburg flights. He was called to the UK for a meeting before the last flight of the Hindenburg and was not aboard during the disaster. Dick earned his balloon and dirigible pilot licenses in 1930, from Orville Wright.

Harold Dick was born in Lawrence, Massachusetts, and died in Wichita, Kansas, at the age of 90.

== Works ==
- Dick, Harold G.; Robinson, Douglas H. (1985). The Golden Age of the Great Passenger Airships: Graf Zeppelin and Hindenburg. Washington, DC: Smithsonian Institution Press. ISBN 0-87474-364-8.
