= John Provan =

English footballer

Personal information
- Place of birth: England
- Position: Centre forward

Senior career*
Years	Team	Apps	(Gls)
1895–1896	Burnley	4	(0)
- * Club domestic league appearances and goals

John Provan was an English professional footballer who played as a centre forward. He played four times in the Football League for Burnley.
