= Vlaardingervaart =

Canal in South Holland, Netherlands

The Vlaardingervaart or Vlaardingse Vaart is a canal in the municipality of Midden-Delfland in the Dutch province of South Holland, between the Gaag in Schipluiden and Vlaardingen, where through the Oude Haven the water is connected to the Nieuwe Maas.

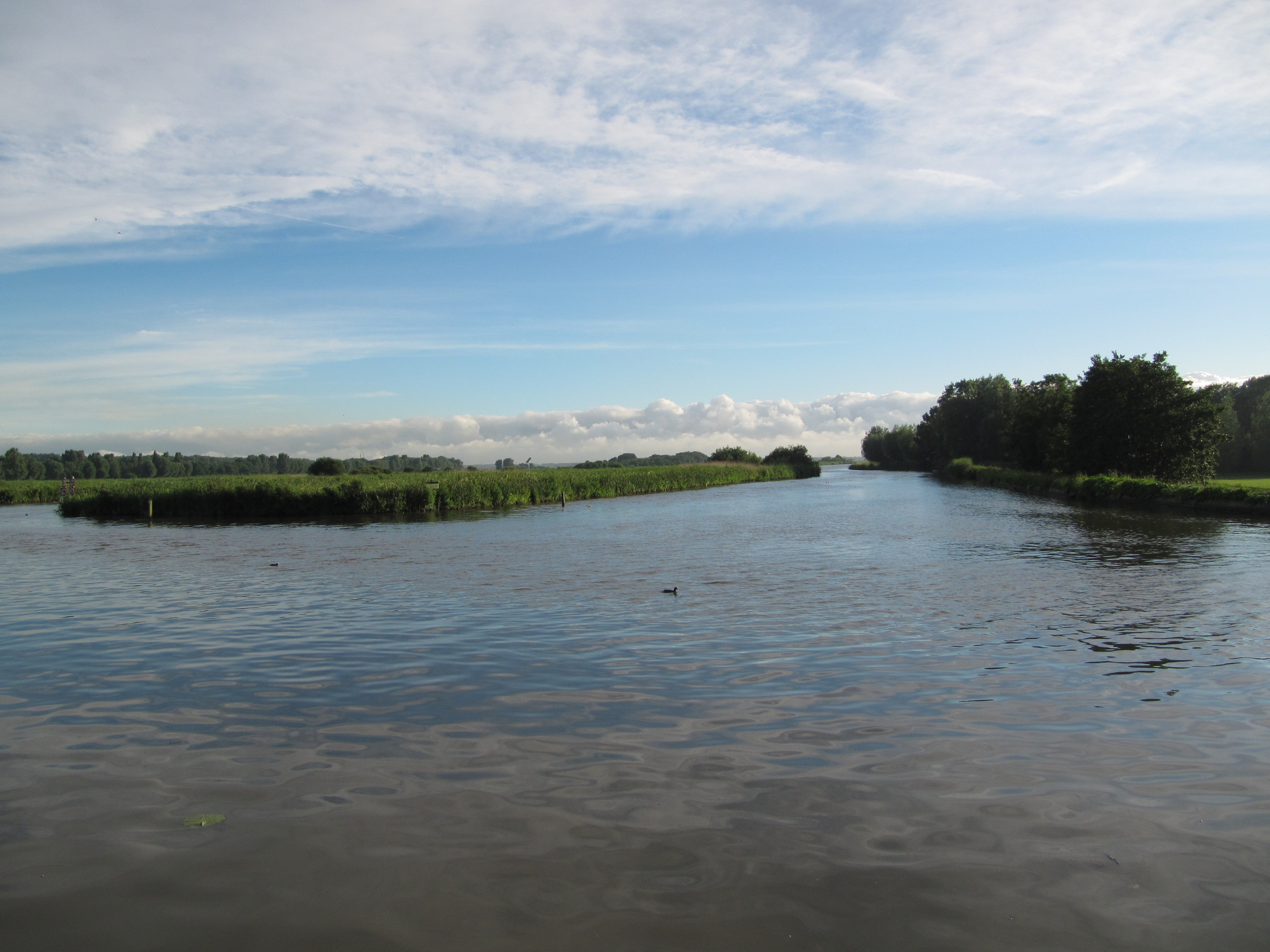
Noordvliet

The Vlaardingervaart is an old drainage canal (from before 1250) and also an old inland shipping route, created by connecting parts of different creeks through dug canals. The Vlaardingervaart already appears on early maps and is mentioned in late medieval documents. Later it became a canal for horse-towed boats, connecting Vlaardingen with Schipluiden, Den Hoorn and Delft. In present time, it is navigable for pleasure craft. On the east side of the canal are the Duifpolder and Broekpolder, on the west side is the Zouteveense Polder, formerly the municipality of Zouteveen, now a neighbourhood of the municipality Midden-Delfland formed in 2004, through the merger of the former municipalities Maasland and Schipluiden, with its local administration in Schipluiden at the north end of the canal.

In the municipality of Vlaardingen the Vlaardingse Vaart Bridge connects its northern town part, Vlaardingen-Holy, with the Broekpolder recreational area.

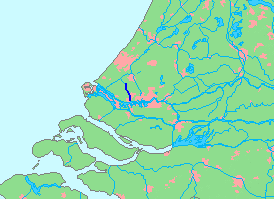
Vlaardingervaart

The length of the Vlaardingervaart is approximately 8 km (5.0 mi). In the middle of the route there is a connection with the Noordvliet from Maassluis. In Schipluiden, the Gaag and Lierwatering merge to form the Vlaardingervaart. Just downstream from this merger of waterways is a bram Bridge, from 1912, from the former tramway connection Westlandsche Stoomtramweg-Maatschappij (1880-1943).

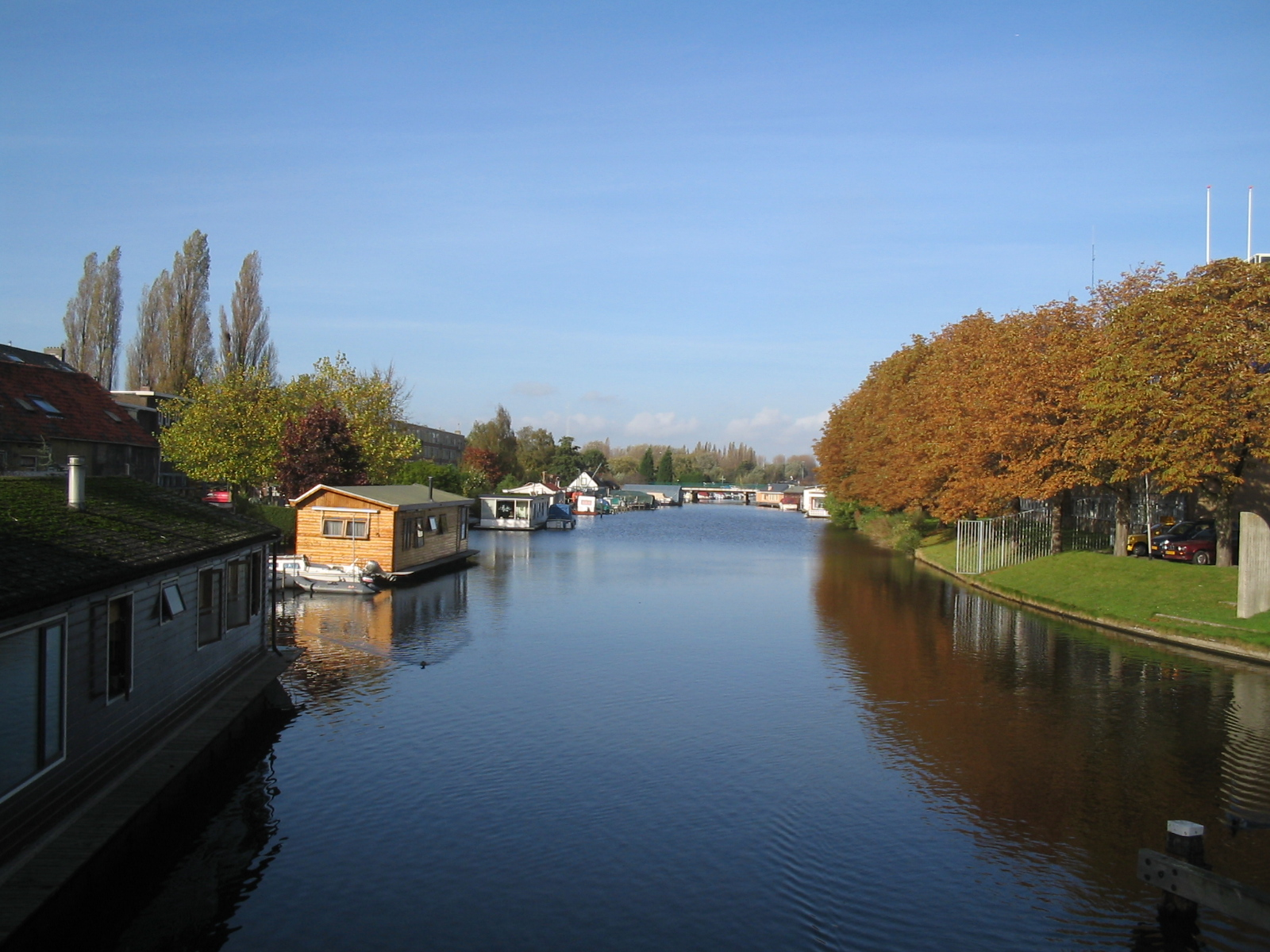
Vlaardingervaart at its most southern end, near the Delftseveerweg, former "Strontenburg" neighbourhood in Vlaardingen

On 2 June 2019, a statue of the Dutch painter Johan Jongkind, made by Dutch sculptor Rob Houdijk, was revealed in the Duifpolder between Maassluis and Vlaardingen, alongside the Vlaardingertrekvaart canal, on the occasion of the 200th anniversary of Jongkind's birth. At this spot, Jongkind must have made preparatory sketches of the Rechthuis van Zouteveen for one of his later etchings ‘Les deux barques à voile’ in 1862.
