= Westlandsche Stoomtramweg-Maatschappij =

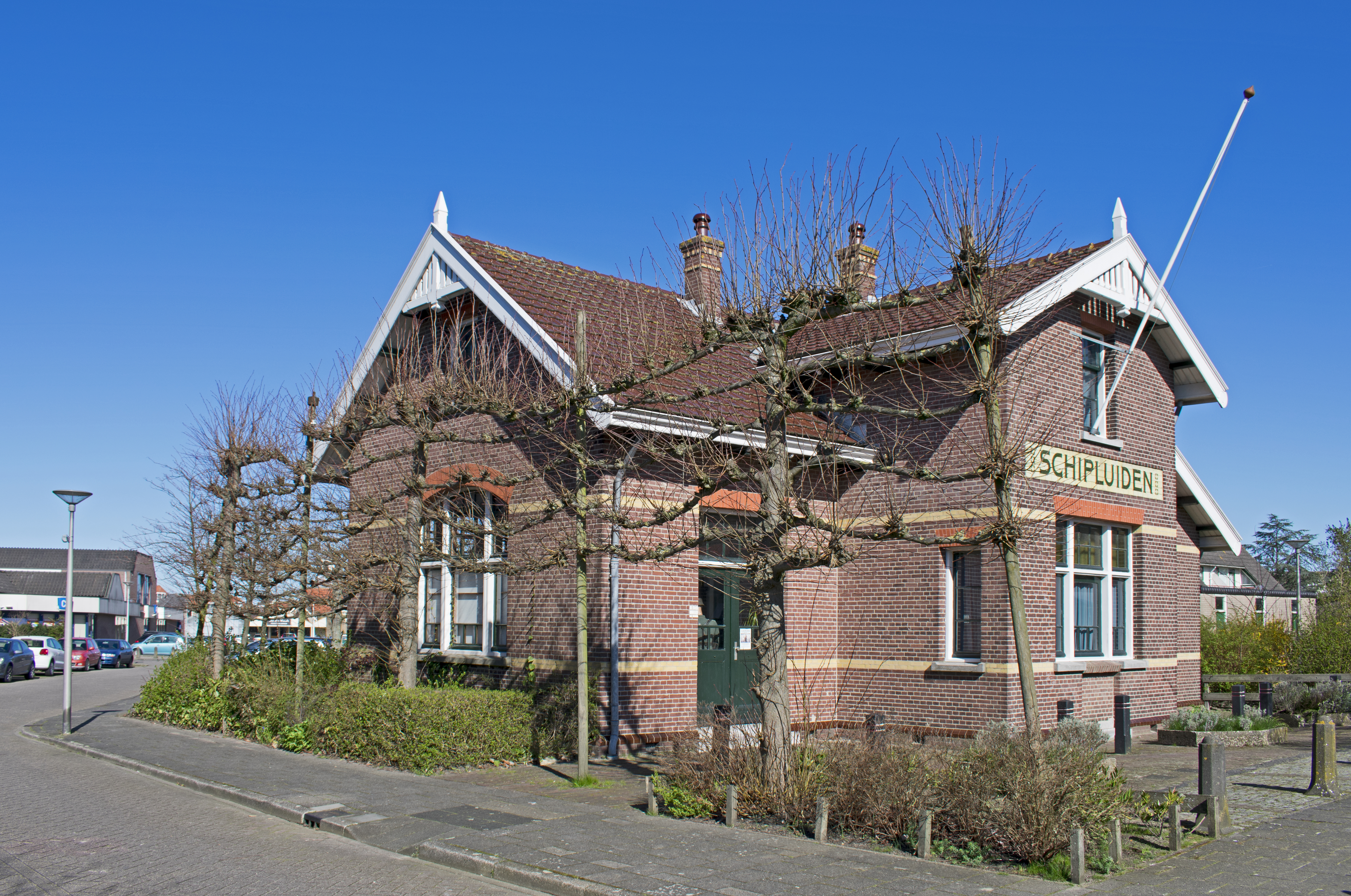
Station Schipluiden

The N.V. Westlandsche Stoomtramweg Maatschappij (W.S.M.) was a tramway company that transported people and goods through the Westland area in the Dutch province of South Holland. The company was founded on 30 July 1881 in Amsterdam and was established in Loosduinen from 14 December 1891 (since 1 July 1923 in the municipality of The Hague).

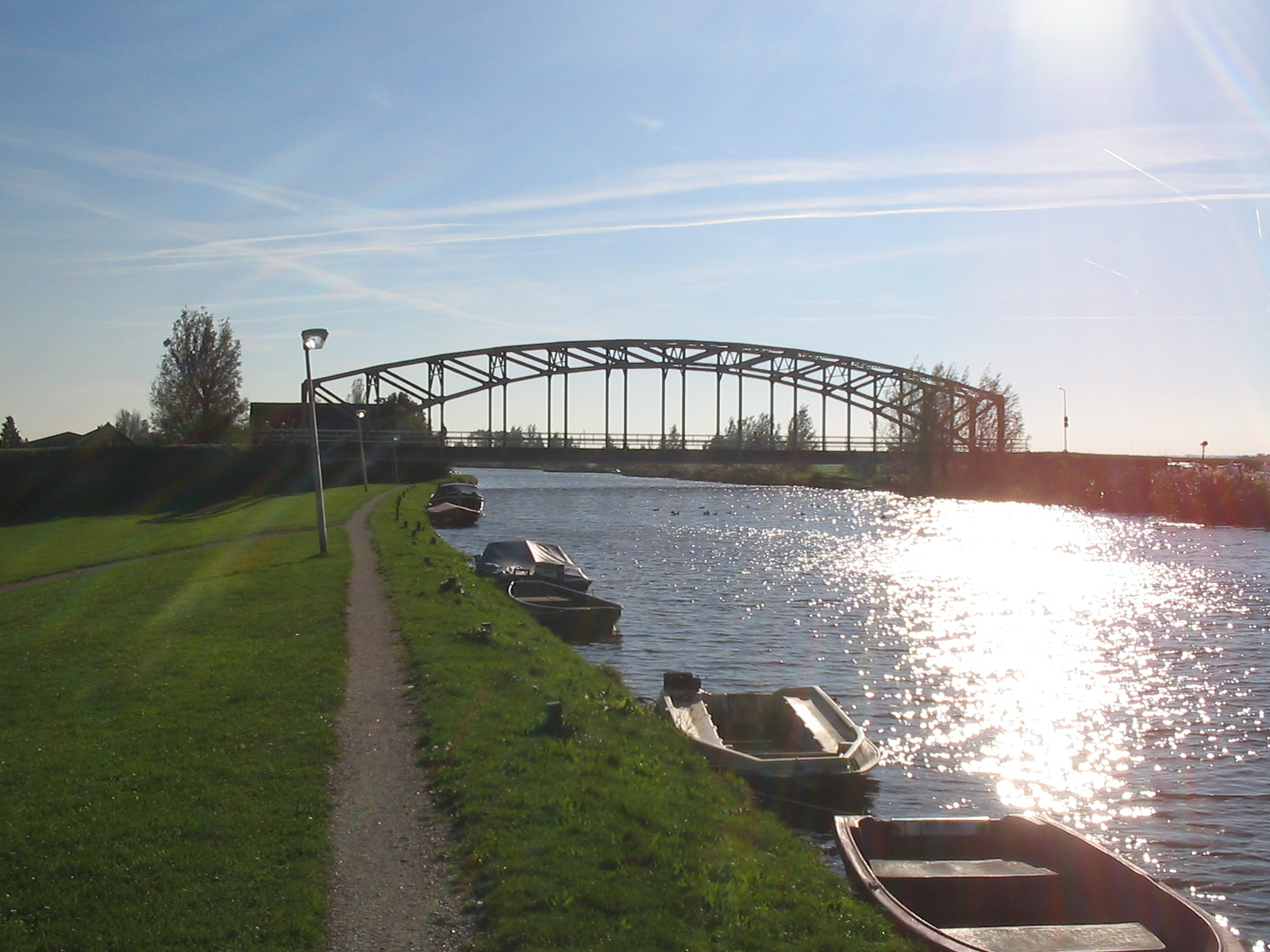
Tram bridge in Schipluiden crossing the Vlaardingervaart

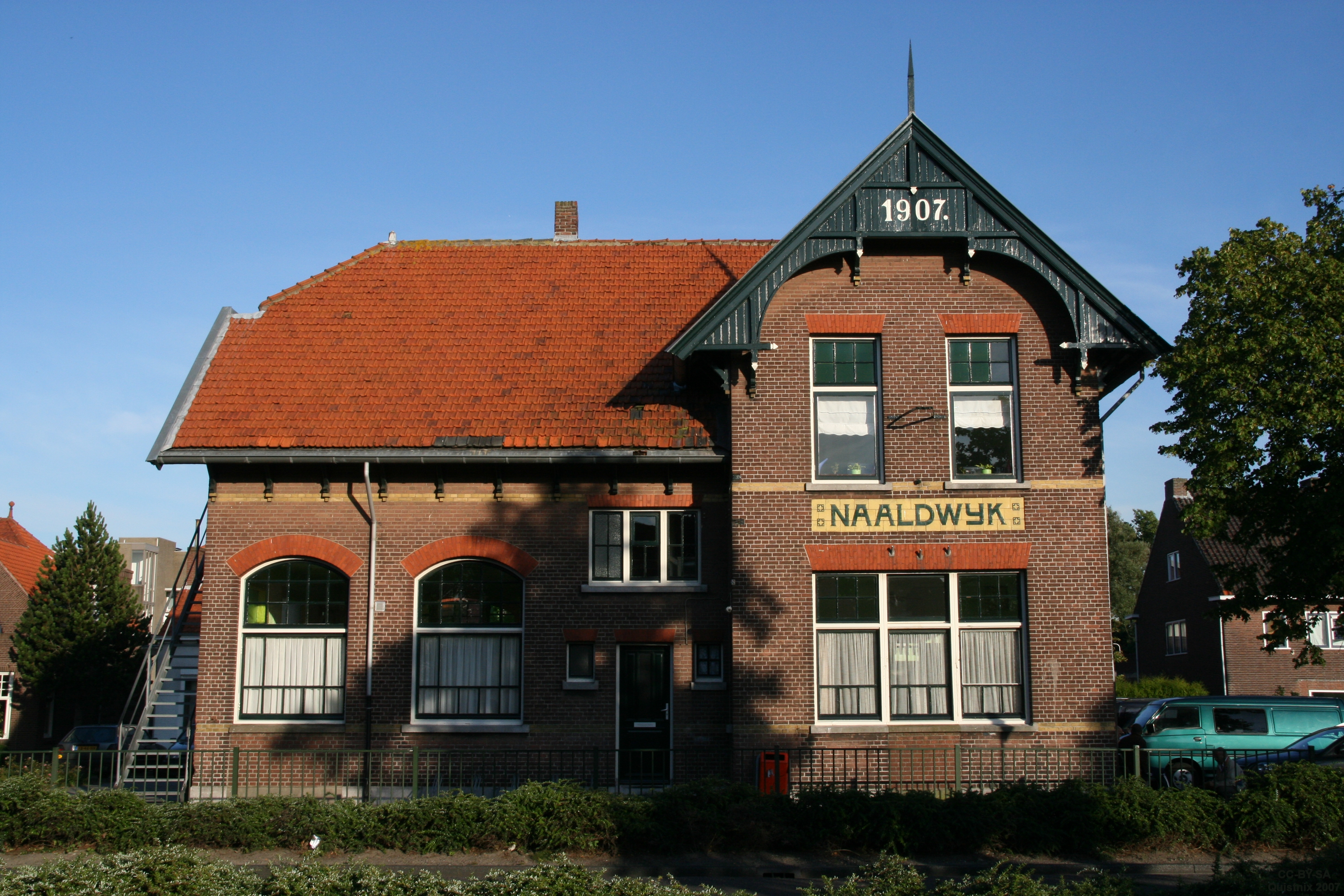
Former station in Naaldwijk in the heart of the Westland area

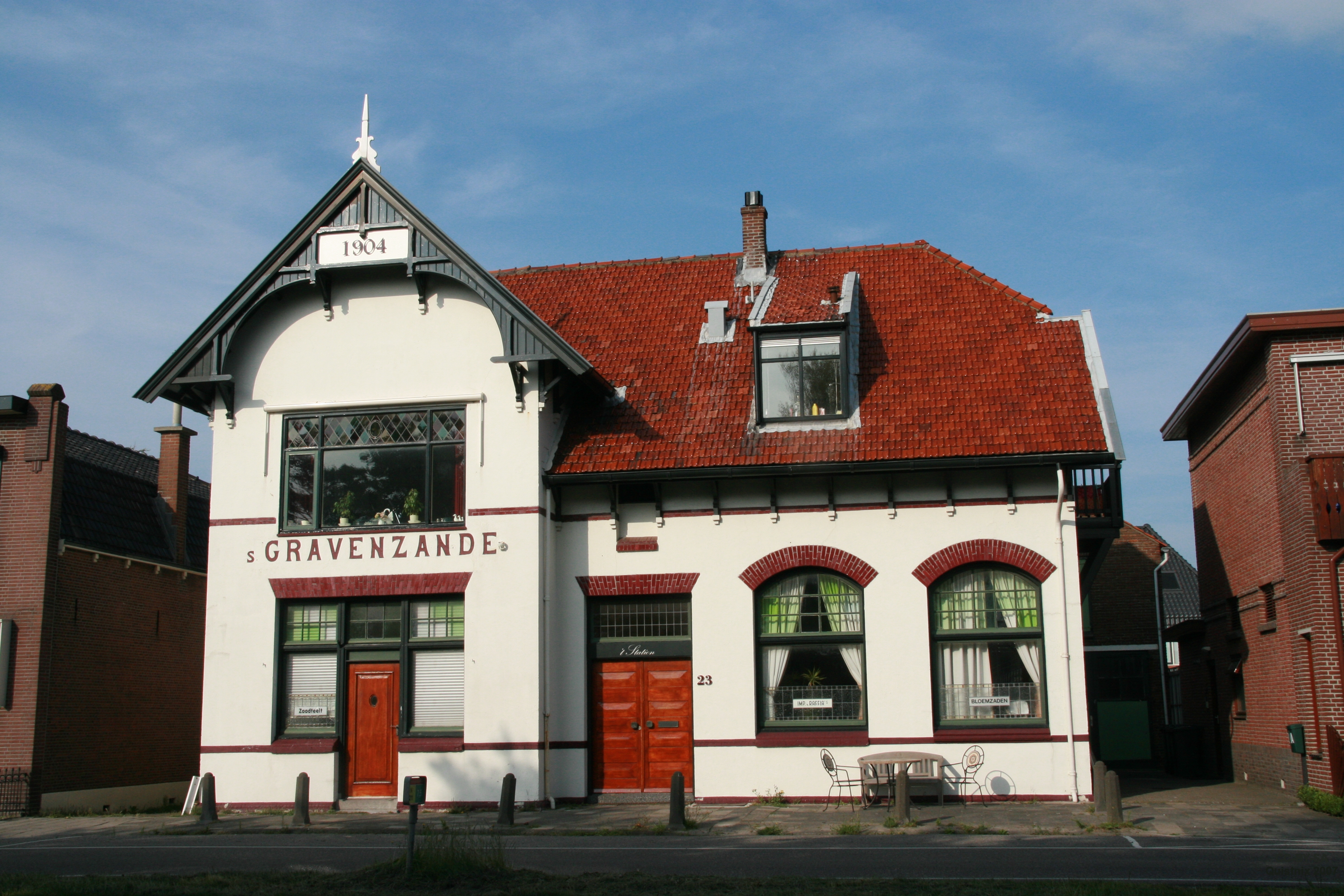
Former station in 's-Gravenzande

== Early history before 1920 ==
Until 1885 the lines of the WSM were operated by the Hollandsche IJzeren Spoorweg-Maatschappij and then by the WSM itself.

In 1886, the WSM purchased land at 's-Gravenzande at the end of the tram line to build waiting rooms for first and second class passengers, a goods office, and an official residence. The building opened in November of that year. At the time, the journey from The Hague to 's-Gravenzande took one hour and ten minutes, and cost 30 to 40 cents.

From 1923 the WSM also operated bus services and grew, since 1941 as a wholly owned subsidiary of the Dutch Railways, into the only regional transport operator in the Westland area. On October 1, 1965, the company name was changed to NV Westlandse Streekvervoer Maatschappij while retaining the initials WSM. The company became part of the transport company in Boskoop on 1 January 1969 and became NV United Streekransport Westnederland, which existed until 1994.

The line network finally had a total length of 49.6 km. It was opened in phases over a 35-year period with the following milestones:

The first route between The Hague Lijnbaan and Loosduinen was opened in 1882 and extended in 1883 via Poeldijk to Naaldwijk. In the same year the Poeldijk - Monster - 's-Gravenzande side branch came into use In 1888 a service came from Loosduinen to Kijkduin with only summer exploitation (only in 1923-24 it also rode in winter). In 1905 the line from 's-Gravenzande was extended to Hook of Holland. In 1907 the tram network was further expanded from Naaldwijk via Westerlee and De Lier to Maaslandse Dam. Five years later, the tram line reached Maassluis station via Maasland. Also in 1912 the connection from Maaslandse Dam via Schipluiden and Den Hoorn to Delft station was established. In 1917 an extra connecting arc was built at Maaslandse Dam, so that people could drive directly to and from all three directions. The choice of normal track proved to be justified, because the horticultural products did not have to be transferred and could be transported further by rail from the connections to the rail network in Delft and Maassluis. In Hook of Holland the goods were transferred on the ferry to Harwich in England. Moreover, the tracks of the WSM ran directly from most auctions in the Westland, for which transported a lot of cargo.

== Later history after 1920 ==
In the 1920s the tram for passenger transport started to lose competition with all kinds of newly established bus services. In 1923 the company decided to set up its own bus service. Passenger transport by tram then declined rapidly. The emphasis in the rail lines was on transporting goods, especially horticultural products and coal for heating the greenhouses.

In October 1932 the entire passenger transport by tram was terminated by the WSM. Only one year during the Second World War (1942–43), the WSM still transported passengers by rail. At the end of the 1940s, the operation of the railways of the WSM was taken over by the Dutch Railways NS, now the parent company of the WSM. There were diesel locomotives, first from the series NS 160 and later from the NS 450 series. In 1965 the goods service was completely taken over by the NS.

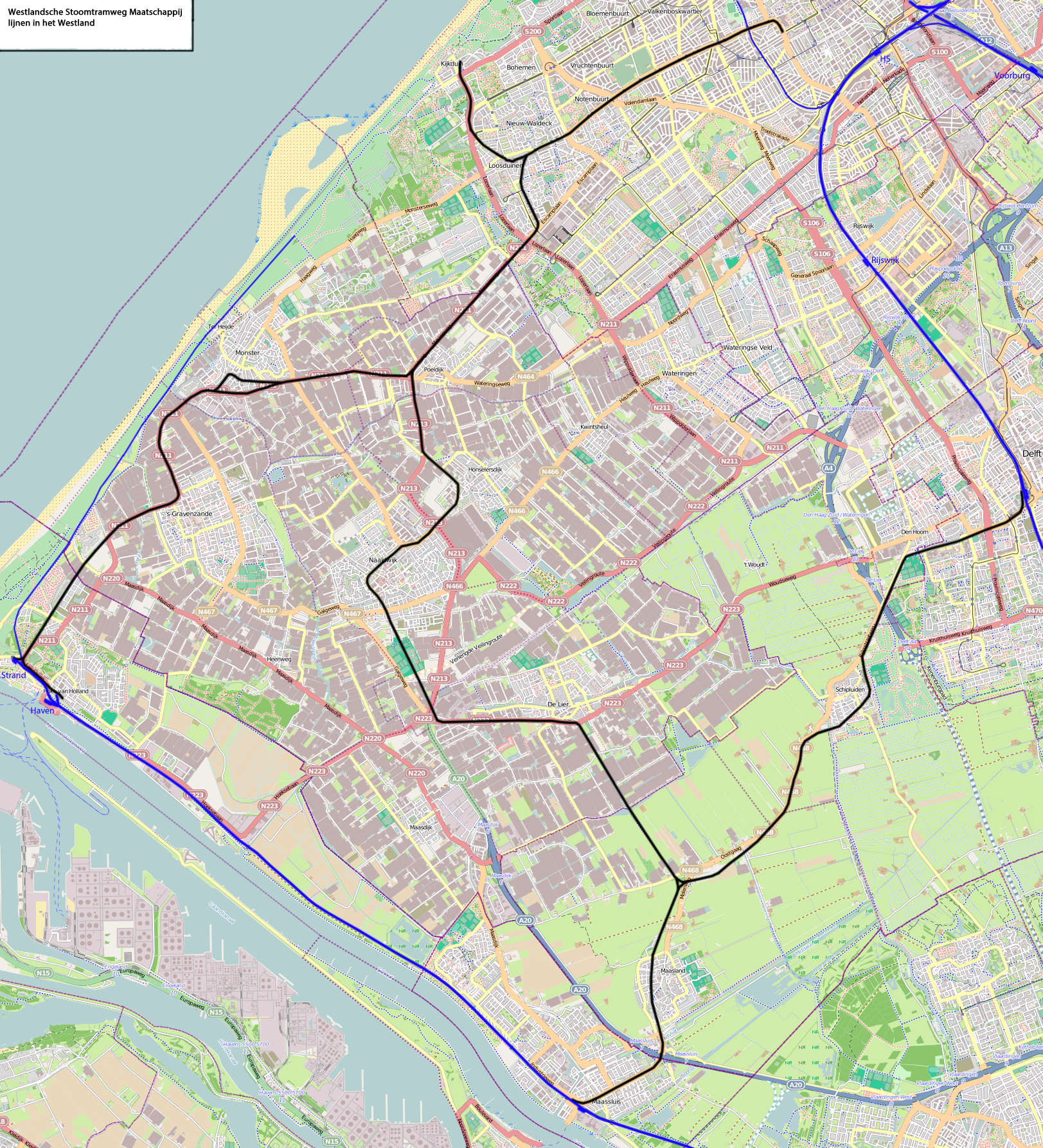
WSM lines on Openstreetmap

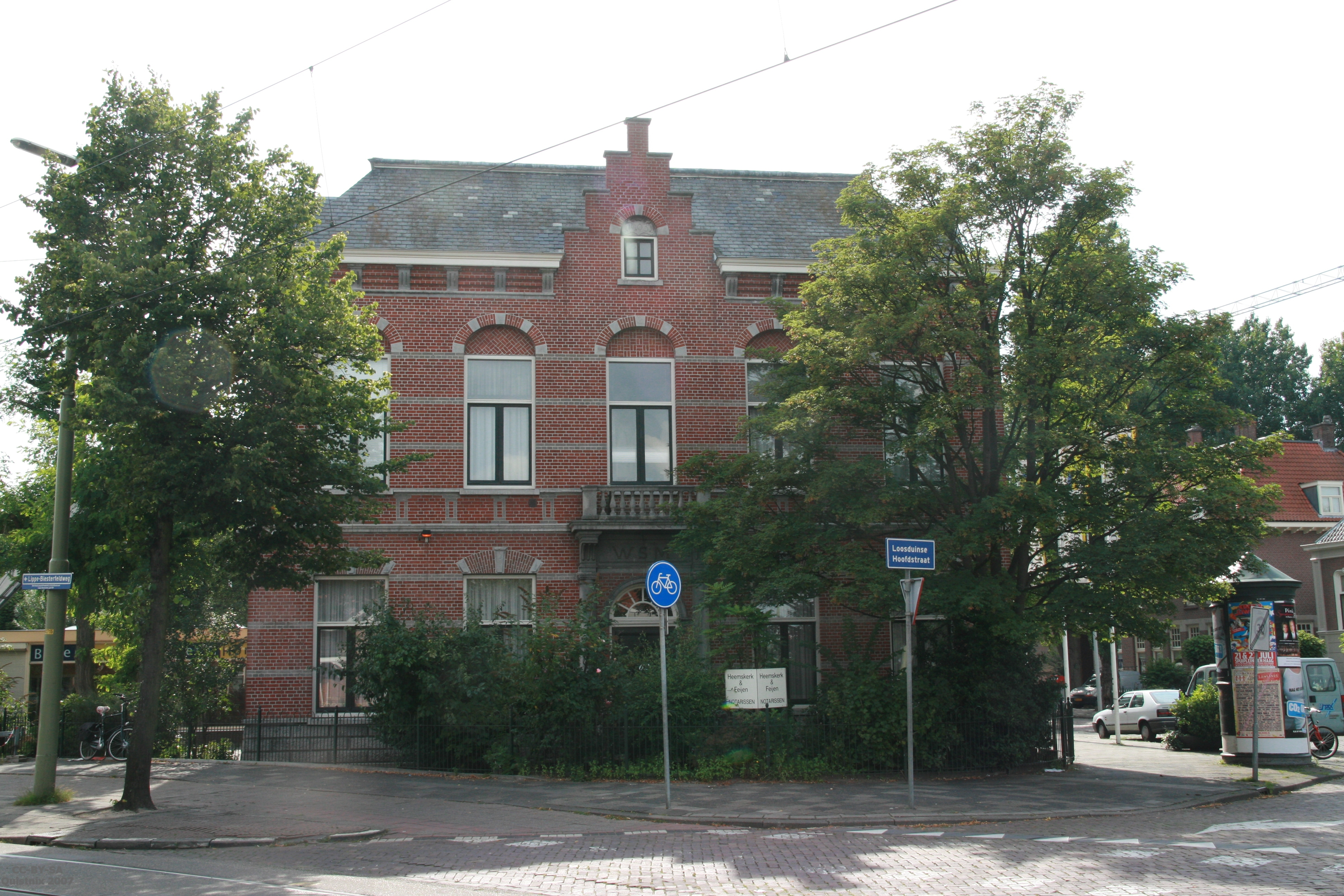
Former WSM main office in Loosduinen

In December 1967, for tourists "nostalgic" journeys were made with two steam tram locomotives (18 and 30) from the Tramweg Foundation from Delft to Loosduinen and back. The last route between Den Hoorn and Delft was definitively closed in February 1970.

The own bus services operated by the WSM since 1923 proved to be a success. In 1928, WSM buses started to provide local transport at an HTM rate to Loosduinen, which was annexed in 1923 by the municipality of The Hague. After October 1932 only buses were used for passenger transport. In 1941 the WSM took over the regular services with permits and part of the bus staff from the watering bus company VIOS, which continued as an independent coach company. The WSM also became a wholly owned subsidiary in 1941.
