= De Kapel =

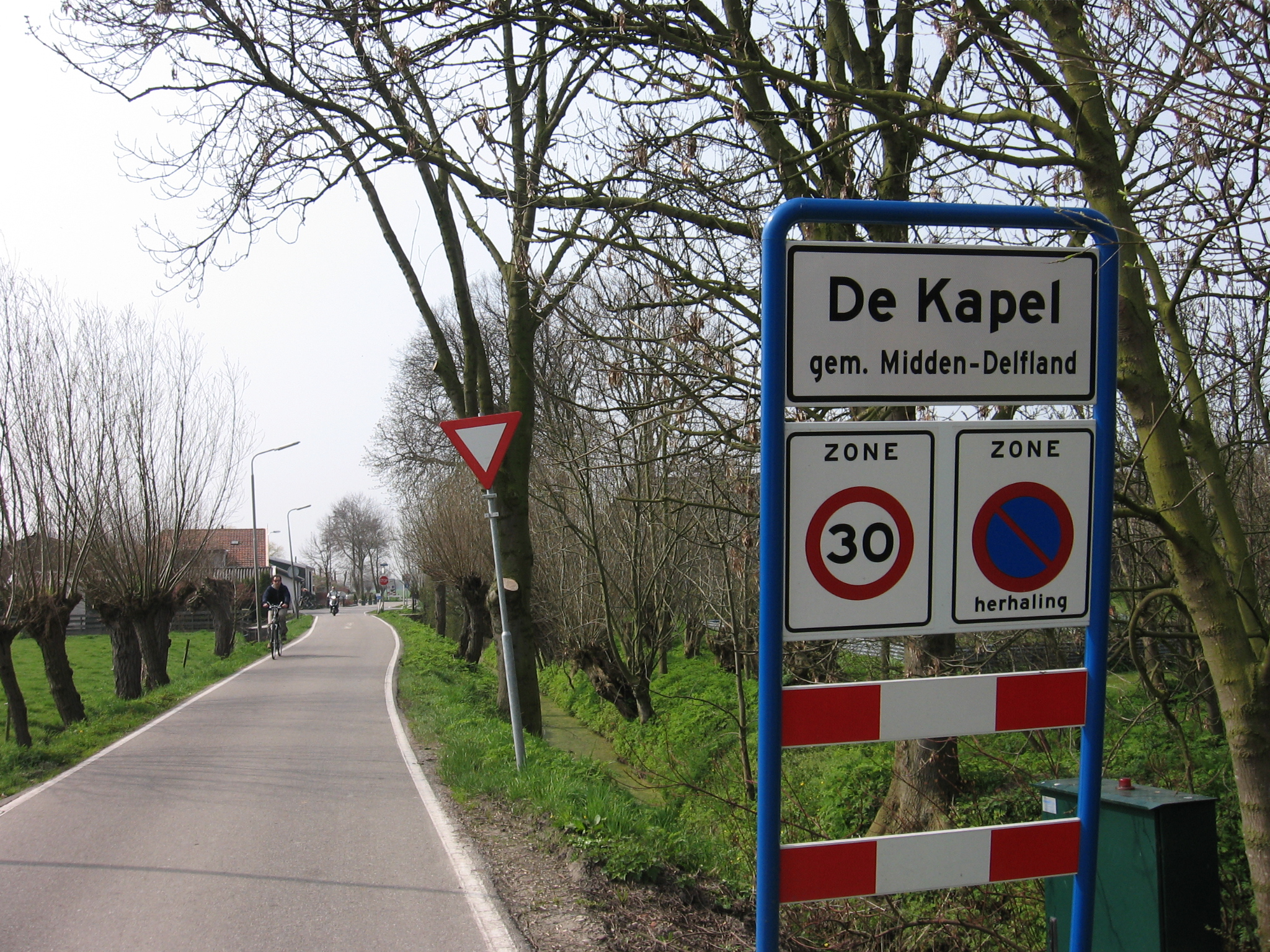

De Kapel (English: The Chapel) is a neighbourhood in the municipality of Midden-Delfland, in the province of South Holland in The Netherlands. It lies in the south of this municipality between Negenhuizen and the town of Vlaardingen. The entire area around the crossroads is also referred to as Zouteveen to the former municipality in the Zouteveense and Holiërhoekse polder, which was dissolved in 1855 and went up in Vlaardinger Ambacht, a former separate municipality annexed by Vlaardingen in 1941.

Around the crossroads of the road between Vlaardingen and Midden-Delfland's core Schipluiden and the Oostveenseweg and Willemoordseweg is the hamlet Aan den Kapel, named after the former Roman Catholic chapel that stood at this junction, until its demolition in 1719.
