= Zouteveen =

De Kapel (Zouteveen)
- Buurtschap
- Coordinates: 51°57′20″N 4°19′37″E
- Country: Netherlands
- Province: South Holland
- Municipality: Midden-Delfland

Population (2007)
  - Total: 210

Zouteveen is a neighbourhood in the municipality Midden-Delfland in the province South Holland in the Netherlands. It is located between Vlaardingen and Delft, about 3 km south of the town of Schipluiden. There are two hamlets in this area: Negenhuizen and De Kapel.

== History ==
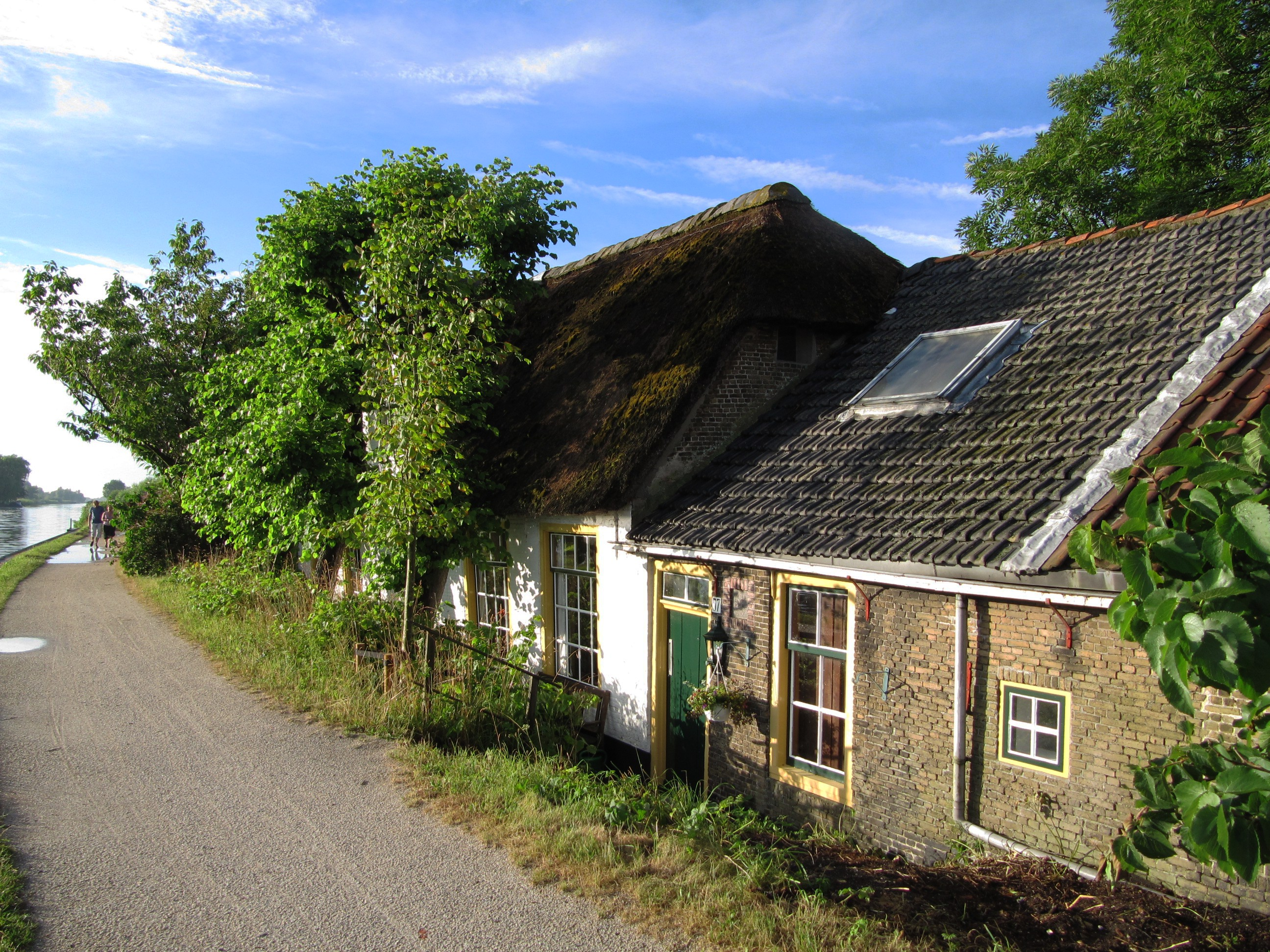
Vlaardingse Schouw

From 1282 until the end of the 18th century, Zouteveen was a heerlijkheid. It was governed from the Vlaardingse Schouw, an inn which still exists; it is now a national monument. In 1482, a chapel was built at a crossroads in the middle of the area. This chapel became the centre of the hamlet De Kapel. The chapel was demolished In 1719.

In 1812, the local jurisdictions in the Netherlands were reorganised, and initially Zouteveen became a part of the municipality of Vlaardingen. However, it became a separate municipality in 1817. The municipality of Zouteveen consisted of two parts. The largest part was located in the Zouteveensche Polder, between the Noordmolensloot in the North and the Zweth in the south. A small disconnected area about 4 km south was also part of the municipality. This part contained the Roman Catholic church of Zouteveen. The cemetery Emmaus in Vlaardingen is located here now.

In 1855, the municipality Zouteveen was disbanded and the area became part of the municipality Vlaardinger-Ambacht.

Coat of arms of Zouteveen.

The coat of arms of Zouteveen consists of a quartered combination of the manorial arms of Mathenesse and Hodenpijl. Its flag shows one quarter only, referring to Mathenesse.
