= Vlaardingse Vaart Bridge =

Twisted bridge in Vlaardingen, Netherlands

Coordinates: 51°55′22″N 4°20′24″E

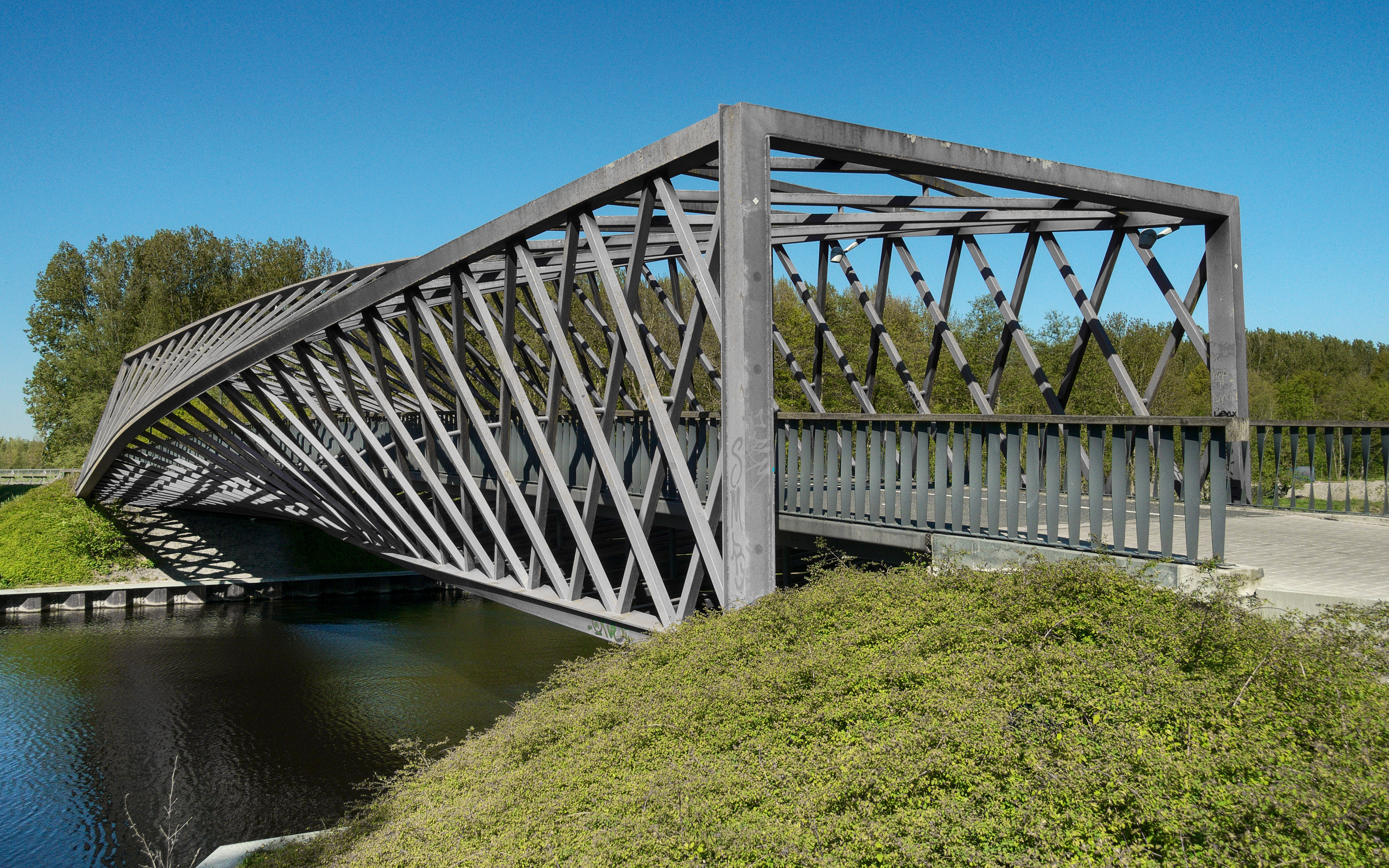

The Vlaardingse Vaart Bridge (also called The Twist) is a helical truss bridge for pedestrian and bicycle traffic over the Vlaardingervaart canal in Vlaardingen, Netherlands.

== Location ==
Vlaardingen is a city in the Netherlands in the western outskirts of Rotterdam, on the north bank of the Maas (Meuse), and the Vlaardingse Vaart Bridge is located in the outskirts of Vlaardingen. It links two Vlaardingen suburbs, Holy-Zuid on the east side of the bridge and Broekpolder on the west side. The bridge has a span of 45 meters across the Vlaardingse Vaart, a canal that runs north from Vlaardingen to Schipluiden.

== Design ==
The bridge's truss is made of 400 steel tubes, welded together and originally painted red; the color has since rapidly faded. The truss's rectangular cross-section twists through a 90 degree angle along the span of the bridge, so that it is nearly horizontal at both ends of the bridge but diamond-shaped in the bridge's center. This design creates an illusion from some points of view that the bridge has collapsed, but it also serves a functional purpose, damping vibrations from traffic on the bridge.

== History ==
The bridge was designed by Dutch firm West 8 beginning in 2005, with structural engineering consultation from another firm, ABT. It was prefabricated and then lifted into place in early 2009, and officially opened in April 2009. It was one of three finalists in the "best public space" category for the Dutch Design Awards in 2009.
