= Zweth =

Coordinates: 51°58′N 4°24′E

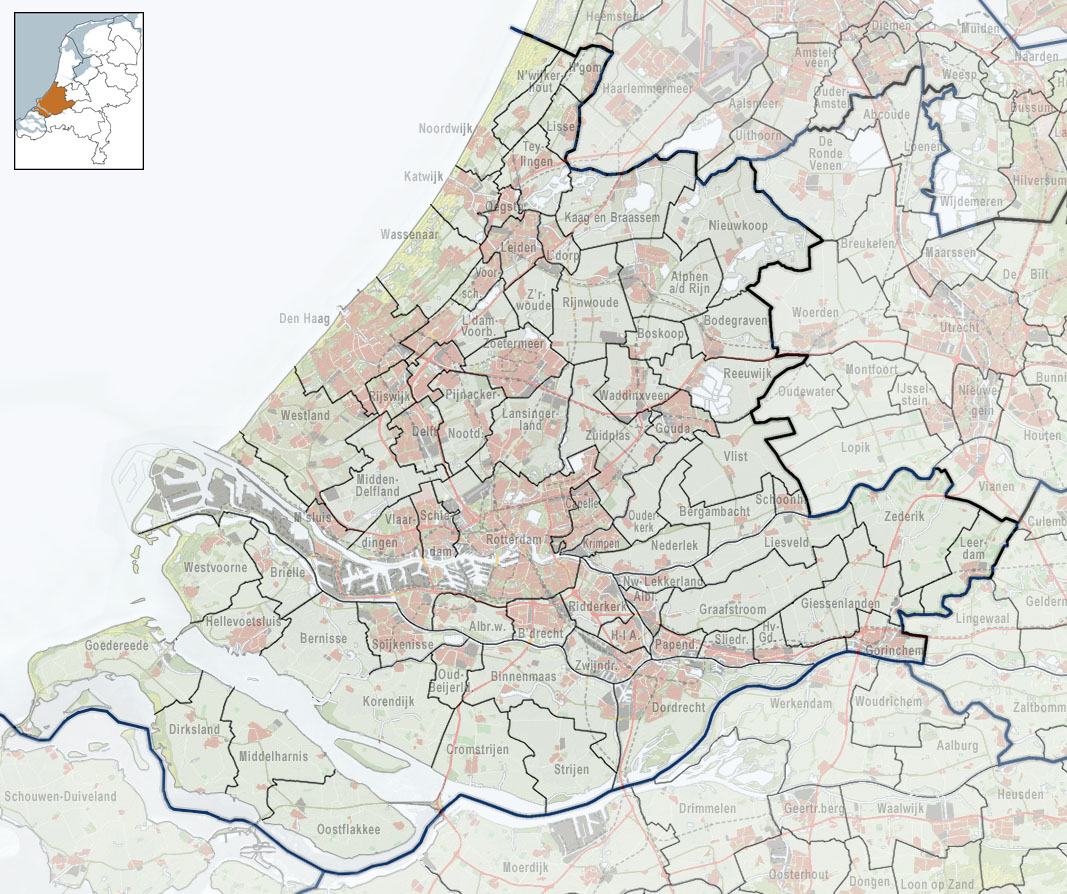
- Interactive map of Zweth
- Country: Netherlands
- Province: South Holland
- Municipality: Midden-Delfland
- Time zone: UTC+1 (CET)

Zweth or De Zweth is a hamlet in the western Netherlands. It is located about halfway between Delft and Rotterdam, where the small river Berkelsche Zweth joins the Schie river, around a bridge across the Berkelsche Zweth.

The hamlet has always been divided between the historical areas of Delfland (north) and Schieland (south). The part north of the bridge is located in the historical municipality of Ackersdijk en Vrouwenregt, currently part of Midden-Delfland, while the southern part is located in the historical municipality of Overschie, since 1941 part of Rotterdam. The two municipalities use two different spellings of the name: the official name for the northern part is "De Zweth", while the southern part is called just "Zweth".

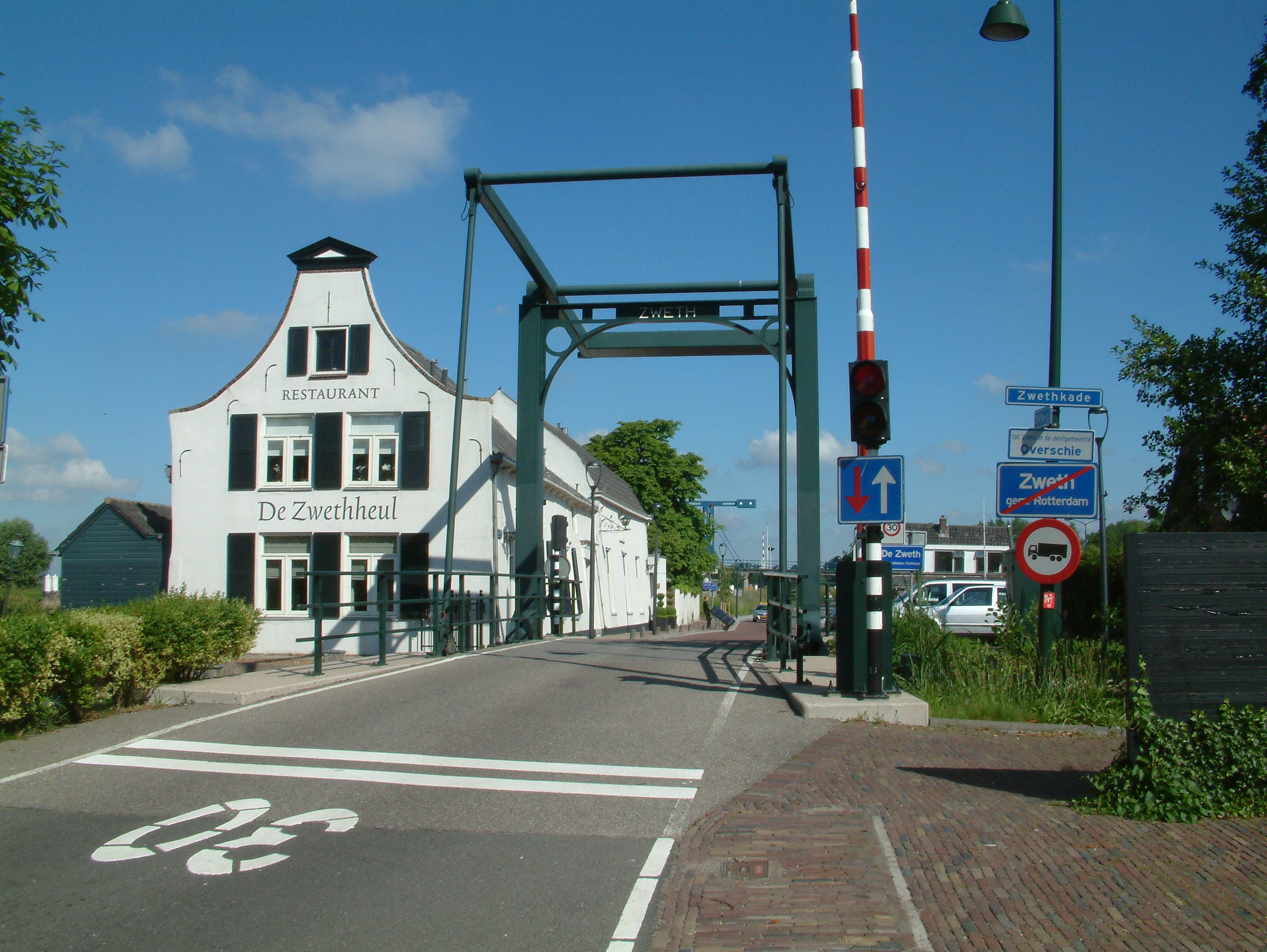
De Zwethheul, at the bridge. Note the two different spellings of the hamlet's name on the official signs.

The restaurant De Zwethheul, a restaurant with two Michelin stars, is located there.
