= Priva BV =

Dutch tech company

Priva B.V.
- Company type: Privately Owned
- Industry: Building Automation, Greenhouse automation
- Founded: De Lier, Netherlands (1959)
- Headquarters: De Lier, Netherlands
- Key people: Jan Prins, Cor Valk, oprichter Meiny Prins, CEO
- Number of employees: 450 (2008)
- Website: http://www.priva.com

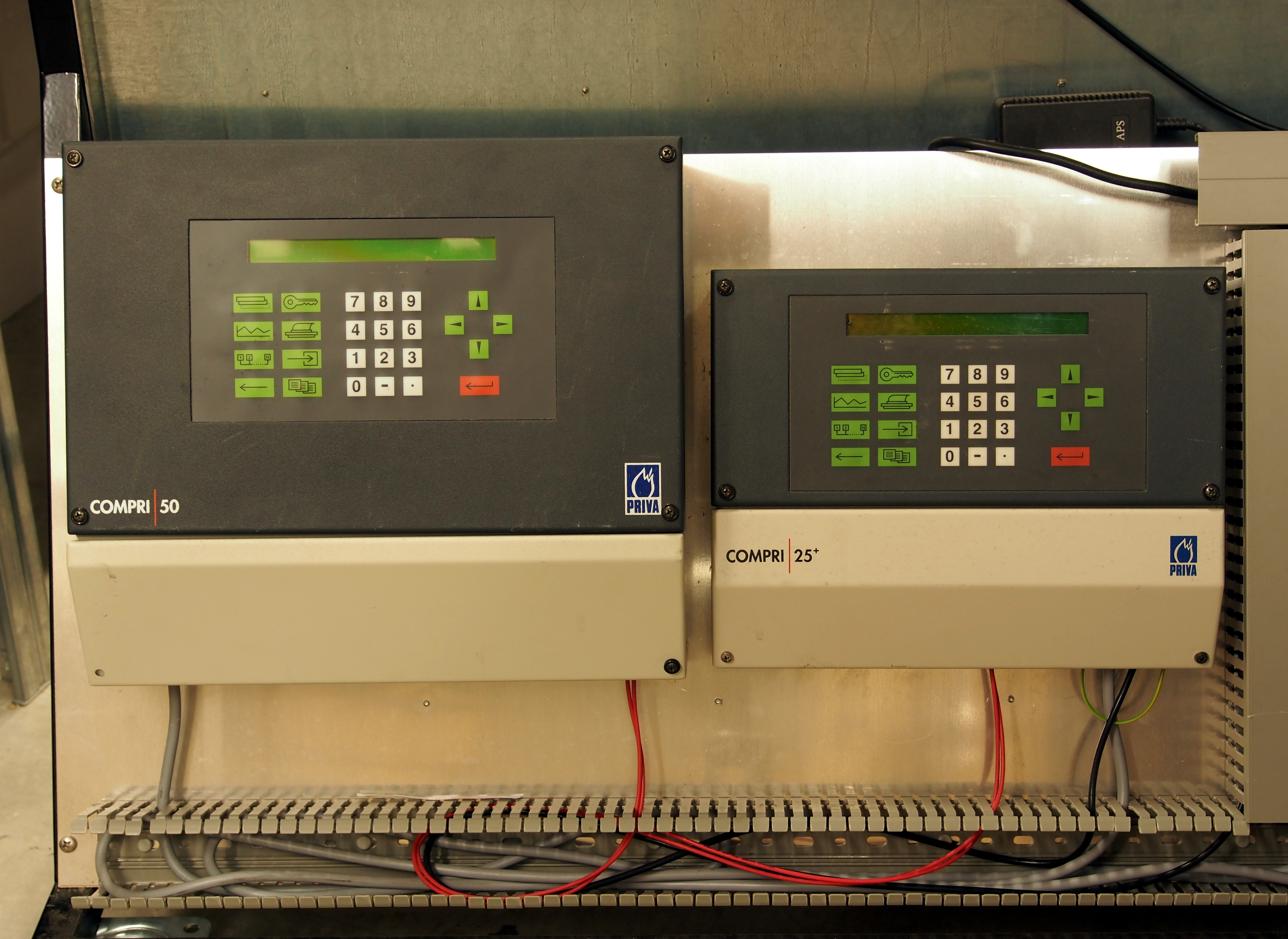
Priva Compri 50 and Compri 25

Priva is a Dutch privately owned high-tech company in the climate control field, specializing in smart building automation, greenhouse technology & indoor farming. It sells services, equipment and software for climate and process control in horticulture and for buildings, being the world leader in the field in horticulture. The company is one of the leading technology and service providers for sustainable urban deltas: circular economies based on green tech and Smart Buildings.

Priva is headquartered in De Lier and has an international presence with 18 offices in other parts of the world. The company employs over 600 people worldwide, of which some 450 in the Netherlands.
