= Rijk Zwaan =

Dutch horticulture company

Rijk Zwaan Zaadteelt en Zaadhandel B.V.
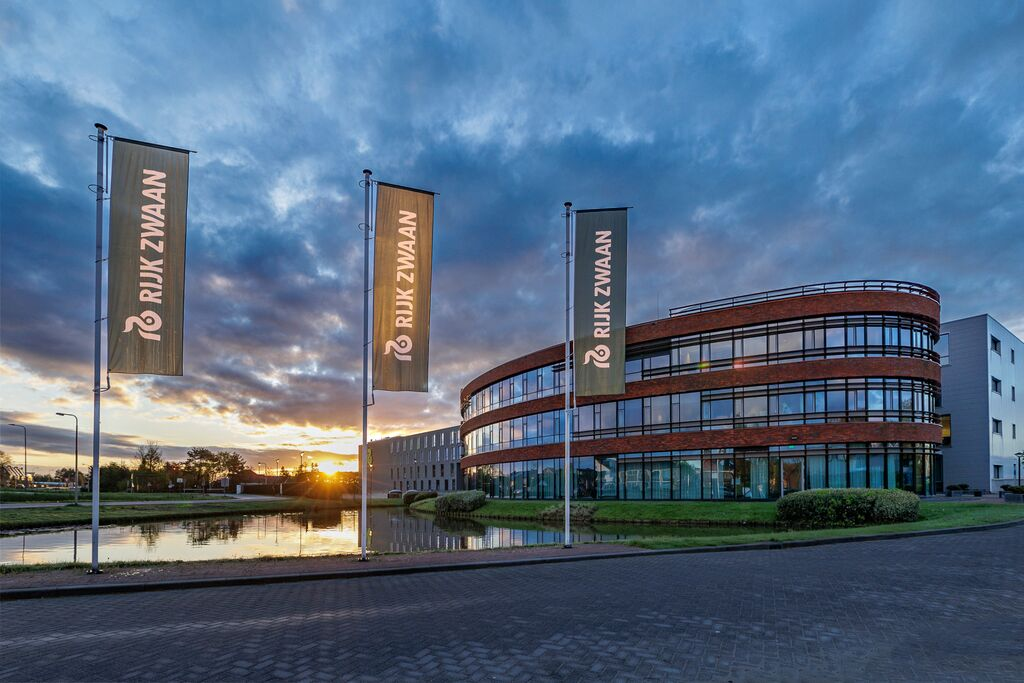
- Industry: Horticulture
- Founded: Rotterdam, Netherlands, 1924
- Founder: Rijkent Zwaan
- Headquarters: De Lier, Netherlands
- Products: Vegetable and fruit seeds
- Owner: 3 families (90%), 1.500 employees (10%)
- Number of employees: around 4,200
- Subsidiaries: over 30, worldwide
- Website: Rijk Zwaan

Rijk Zwaan Zaadteelt en Zaadhandel B.V. is a Dutch vegetable and fruit breeding company headquartered in De Lier in the province of South Holland. With a market share of 9%, Rijk Zwaan is amongst the top 10 of vegetable breeding companies worldwide. The family-owned company breeds over 30 different types of vegetables and fruits, including lettuce, tomato, cucumber, bell pepper and cabbage. In 2024, Rijk Zwaan celebrated its centenary and was awarded the designation 'Royal'.

== History ==
=== Foundation and growth ===
The founder of the company, Mr Rijk Zwaan, came from a family of seed growers and seed traders living in the Dutch town of Enkhuizen, which evolved into a centre for the seed production industry in the late nineteenth century. In 1924 Zwaan opened a shop selling seeds on the street called Zwaanshals in Rotterdam. In order to select plants himself and hence gain more control over the seed quality, he arranged for his own seed production and breeding facilities to be built in Bergschenhoek in 1932. In the period following the Second World War, there was explosive growth in the horticulture sector. Westland, Zwaan's key sales area in the west of the Netherlands, became an important region for the production of vegetables in greenhouses. The company grew rapidly in the second half of the 20th century and the headquarters were moved to De Lier in Westland in 1970. In 1964 the first foreign subsidiary was set up, in Germany. From 1980 onwards, the international market became increasingly important to the company, and the number of locations outside the Netherlands grew to more than 30.

=== Management buyout ===
In 1986 the Zwaan family decided to sell their shares in the company to BP Nutrition because of a lack of successor within the family. BP Nutrition invested in Rijk Zwaan for the first two years, but the multinational then changed its strategy and put the organisation up for sale in 1989. The board of directors, employees and even customers vigorously opposed sale of the business to parties that wanted to dismantle or merge the breeding company. They wanted the company to remain intact and independent. With financial support from employees and the Cebeco-Handelsraad agricultural and horticultural cooperative, the board of directors succeeded in buying the company from BP Nutrition. In 2001, the management acquired a 90% ownership stake. The remaining shares were made available to employees through participation certificates.

Since the 1990s, the company's progress has been characterised by internationalisation and new technology. In 1989 the organisation became a shareholder in biotechnology company KeyGene. In 2004 Rijk Zwaan set up a second research facility in the Dutch region of West-Brabant.

== Products ==
Rijk Zwaan breeds vegetables and fruit. Its assortment mainly consists of leafy vegetables, fruit vegetables, root crops and brassicas. In 2023, Rijk Zwaan started breeding raspberries, strawberries and blackberries. In total, the company offers more than 2,000 varieties. The traits selected for include resistance to diseases and pests, resilience to challenging growing conditions such as drought, taste and texture, consistency, production value, and health and nutritional value. Growing conditions and markets for vegetables vary greatly worldwide. For this reason, varieties are developed that are specifically suited to local growing and market conditions. Rijk Zwaan does not develop varieties that fall under regulations for genetically modified organisms (GMOs).

Seeds that are produced elsewhere are cleaned and tested in the Netherlands for purity, varietal identity, genetic purity, seed-borne diseases and germination capacity. Some seeds are given additional treatments, such as pelleting to make them easier to sow, or coating to protect against seedling diseases. The company produces and sells the seeds and provides customers with knowledge and expertise. To determine whether crops are suitable for local conditions, varieties are tested in practice with growers around the world. In advising growers, the company works together with governments, non-governmental organisations and other (local) partners. The company also exchanges information with businesses throughout the vegetable supply chain, such as retail chains, food companies and fresh-cut processors.
