= Ackersdijk en Vrouwenregt =

Coordinates: 51°58′N 4°24′E

Ackersdijk en Vrouwenregt is a former municipality in the Dutch province of South Holland, located about halfway between Delft and Schiedam. It existed from 1817 to 1855, when it was joined to the municipality of Vrijenban. The area is now part of the municipalities of Midden-Delfland, Delft, and Pijnacker-Nootdorp.

The municipality had about 150 inhabitants.
