= De Zwethheul =

Coordinates: 51°57′45.74″N 4°23′37.58″E

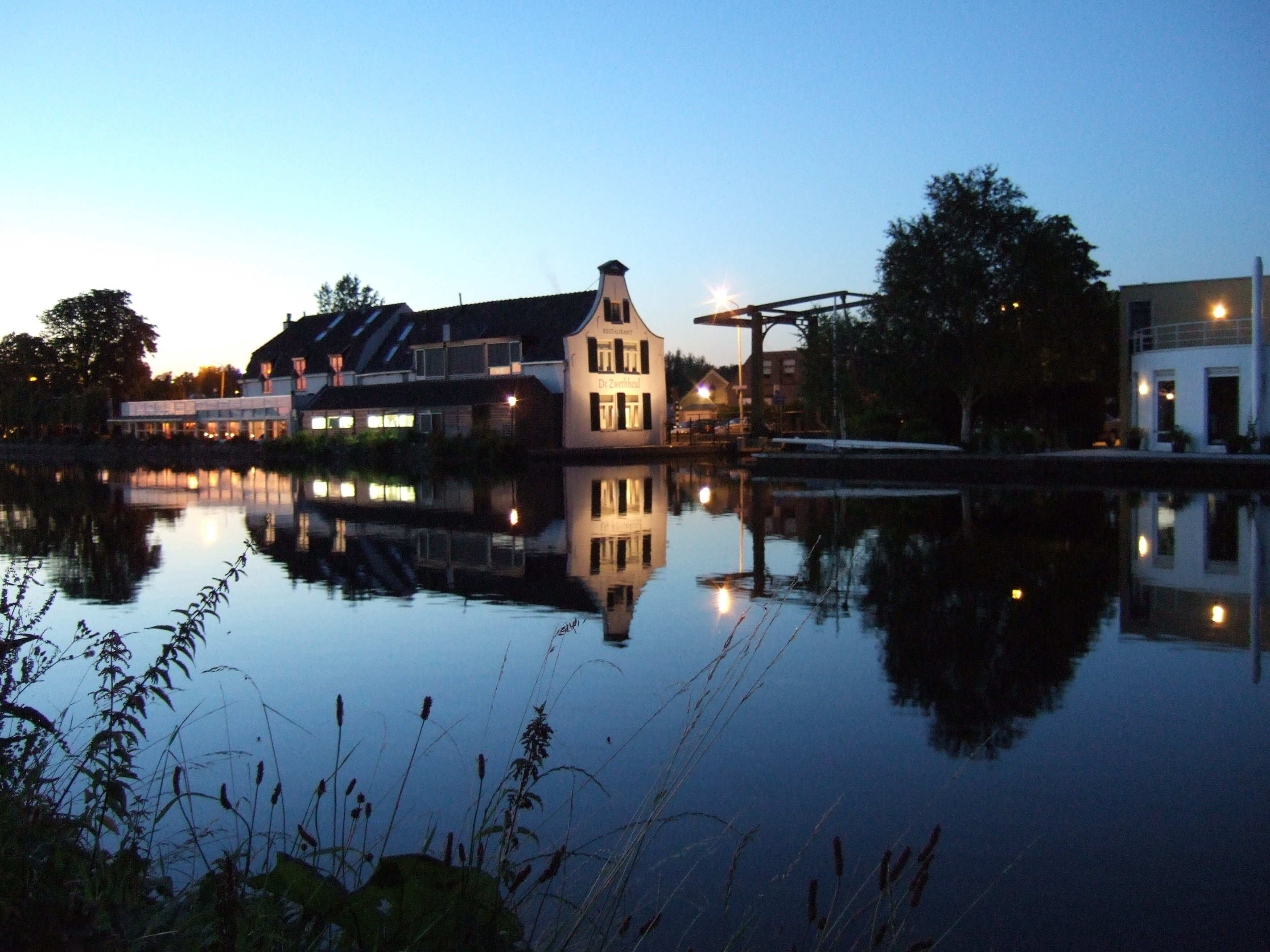
- Interactive map of De Zwethheul

Restaurant information
- Closed: January 8, 2015
- Head chef: Mario Ridder
- Food type: French
- Rating: Michelin Guide
- Location: Rotterdamseweg 480, Zweth, Schipluiden, Netherlands
- Seating capacity: 80
- Website: www.zwethheul.nl/home/uk/uk

De Zwethheul is a defunct restaurant located in Zweth, Netherlands. It was a fine dining restaurant that was awarded one Michelin star in the period 1990-2004 and two Michelin stars in the period 2005–2014. De restaurant closed on 8 January 2015 and was replaced by restaurant "Aan de Zweth".

Last head chef was Mario Ridder, who took over in 2006 from Erik van Loo. Cees Wildschut earned the first ever star for the restaurant.

== See also ==
- List of Michelin starred restaurants in the Netherlands
