= Hodenpijl =

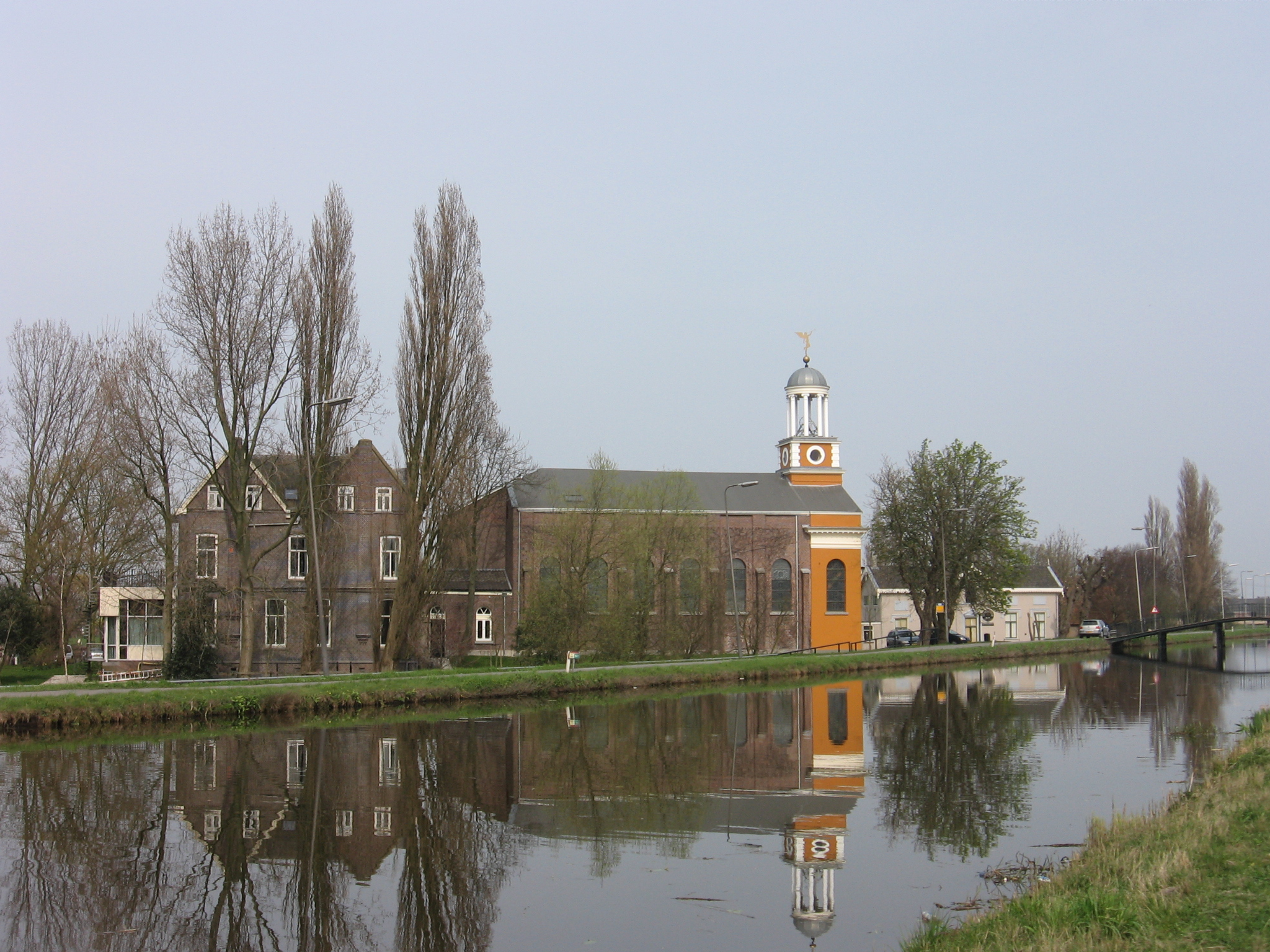
- Hodenpijl and river Gaag

- Coat of arms

- Location within Netherlands
- Coordinates: 51°59′13″N 4°19′17″E
- Country: Netherlands
- Province: South Holland
- Municipality: Midden-Delfland

Population (2005)
  - Total: 130

Hodenpijl is a hamlet in the Dutch province of South Holland. It is located 3 km southwest of the centre of Delft, in the municipality of Midden-Delfland.

Hodenpijl was a separate municipality between 1817 and 1855, when it merged with Schipluiden.
