= Oostbuurt =

- Hamlet
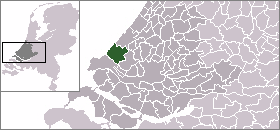

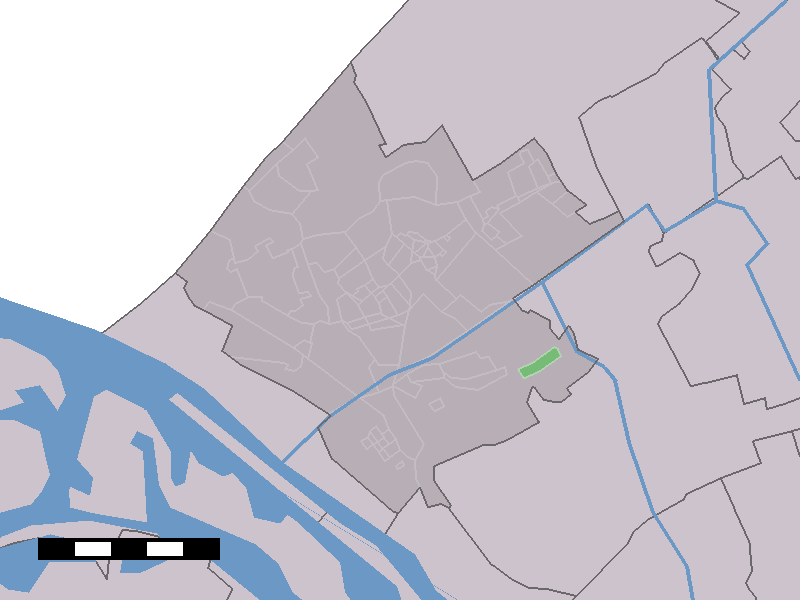
- Oostbuurt in the municipality of Westland.
- Coordinates: 51°58′01″N 4°16′23″E
- Country: Netherlands
- Province: South Holland
- Municipality: Midden-Delfland

Population (2007)
  - Total: 140
- Time zone: UTC+1 (CET)
  - Summer (DST): UTC+2 (CEST)

Oostbuurt is a hamlet in the Dutch province of South Holland. It is a part of the municipality of Westland, and lies about 6 km north of Maassluis.

The statistical area "Oostbuurt", which also can include the surrounding countryside, has a population of around 150.
