= Sint Maartensregt =

Coordinates: 51.975192°N 4.31679°E

Sint Maartensregt is a former municipality in the Dutch province of South Holland. It consisted of two former manors: "Sint Maartensregt" and "Dorp-Ambacht".

Sint Maartensregt was a separate municipality between 1817 and 1855, when it became part of Schipluiden.
