= Blaker, Netherlands =

Hamlet in the Netherlands

Baakwoning
- Hamlet
- Interactive map of Baakwoning
- Coordinates: 51°58′58″N 4°16′12″E
- Country: Netherlands
- Province: South Holland
- Municipality: Westland

Blaker is a hamlet in the Dutch province of South Holland. It is located in the municipality of Westland (formerly De Lier), about 2 km northeast of the village of De Lier.

The hamlet consists of a single road, stretching between the Leê canal and the Noord Lierweg road.

The area in which the hamlet is located, the "Oude Lierpolder", used to be called "Blaker" as well.
