= Nieuwe Tuinen =

- Hamlet
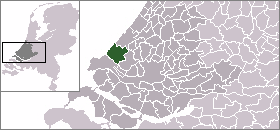

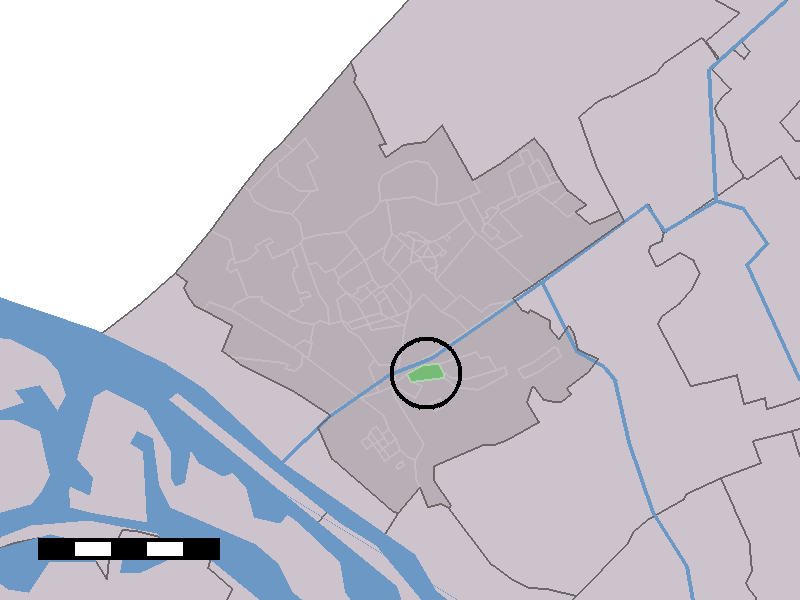
- Nieuwe Tuinen in the municipality of Westland.
- Coordinates: 51°58′43″N 4°13′09″E
- Country: Netherlands
- Province: South Holland
- Municipality: Westland

Population (1 January 2005)
  - Total: 140
- Time zone: UTC+1 (CET)
  - Summer (DST): UTC+2 (CEST)

Nieuwe Tuinen is a hamlet in the Dutch province of South Holland. It is a part of the municipality of Westland, and lies about 5 km north of Maassluis.

== Demographics ==
The statistical area "Nieuwe Tuinen", which also can include the surrounding countryside, has a population of around 140.
