= De Lier =

- Flag Coat of arms

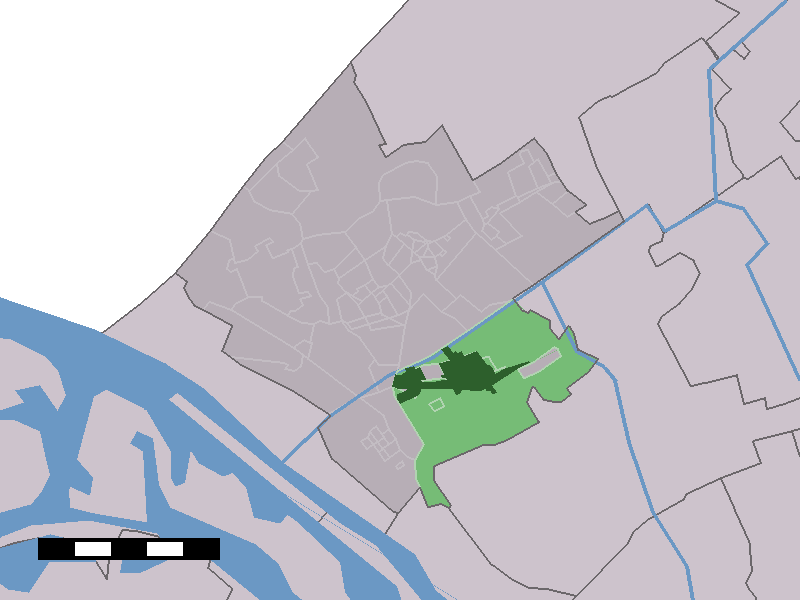
- The village centre (dark green) and the statistical district (light green) of De Lier in the municipality of Westland.

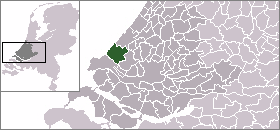
- Coordinates: 51°58′25″N 4°15′00″E
- Country: Netherlands
- Province: South Holland
- Municipality: Westland

Area
  - Total: 8.92 km^{2} (3.44 sq mi)

Population
  - Total: 11.925
- Postal code: 2678
- Major roads: N223
- Website: http://www.gemeentewestland.nl

De Lier (Dutch pronunciation: [də ˈliːr]) is a village in the Dutch province of South Holland. It is a part of the municipality of Westland.

== Geography ==
De Lier lies about 5 km north of Maassluis, and is about 6 feet (1.8 m) below sea level. The village got its name from the name of an old river called Lee (De Lier).

== History ==
De Lier used to be a separate municipality. On 26 March 1963, it was granted its own coat of arms, and on 14 April 1965, it adopted the flag it has today. On 1 January 2004, it merged with Naaldwijk, 's-Gravenzande, Monster, and Wateringen to form the municipality of Westland. The former municipality covered an area of 8.93 square kilometres.

== Population ==
In 2001, De Lier had 9415 inhabitants. In 2003, De Lier had 11,400 inhabitants. The built-up area of the village was 2.2 km², and contained 3494 residences. The statistical area "De Lier", which can also include the peripheral parts of the village as well as the surrounding countryside, has a population of around 11,470.

== Nearby quarters ==
- Nieuwe Tuinen 1.6 nautical miles (3.0 km) west
- Blaker 1-nautical-mile (1.9 km) north
- Lierhand 1.2 nautical miles (2.2 km) north
- Oostbuurt 1.2 nautical miles (2.2 km) north
- Gaag 1-nautical-mile (1.9 km) south
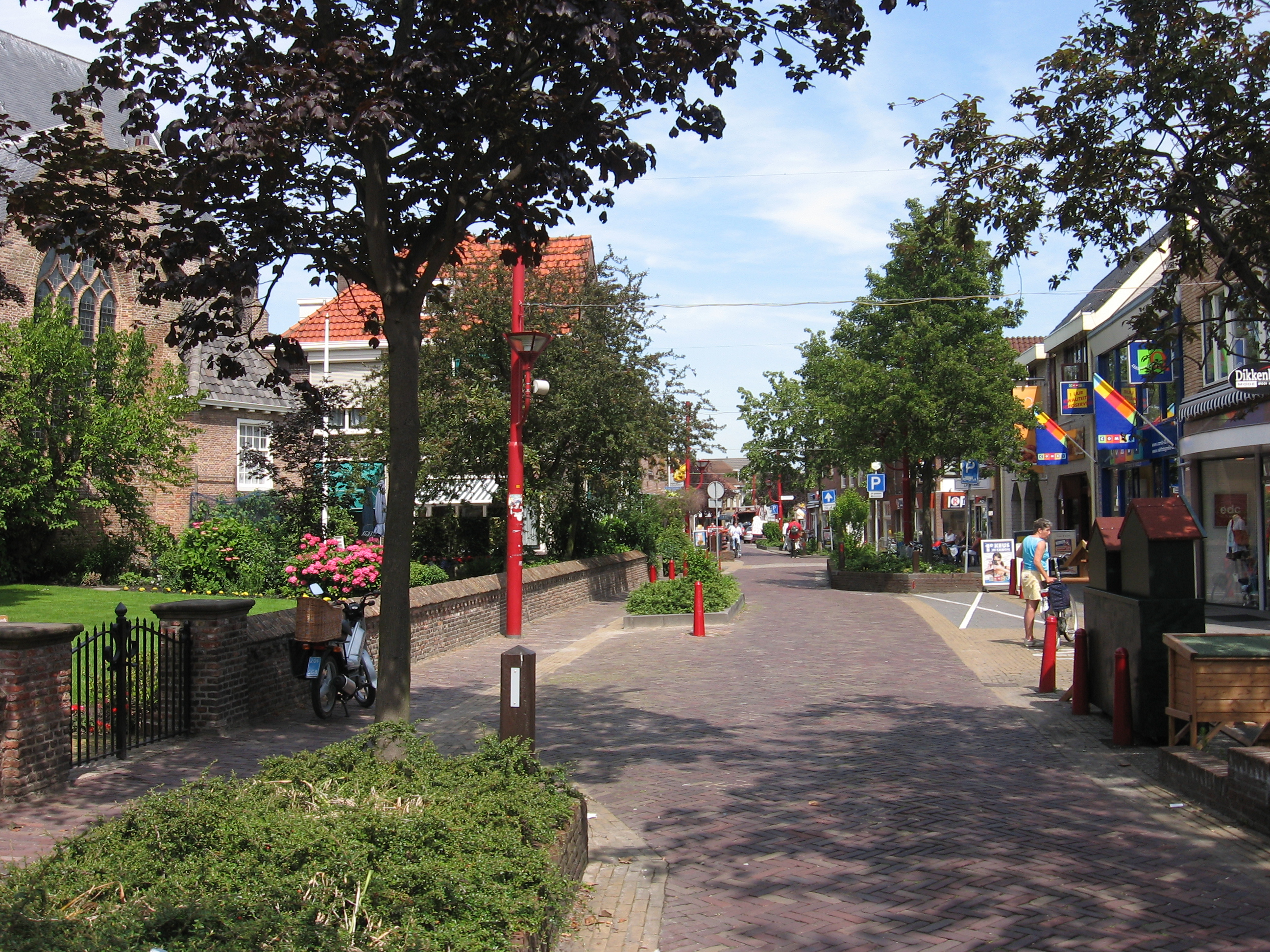
Main street of De Lier.

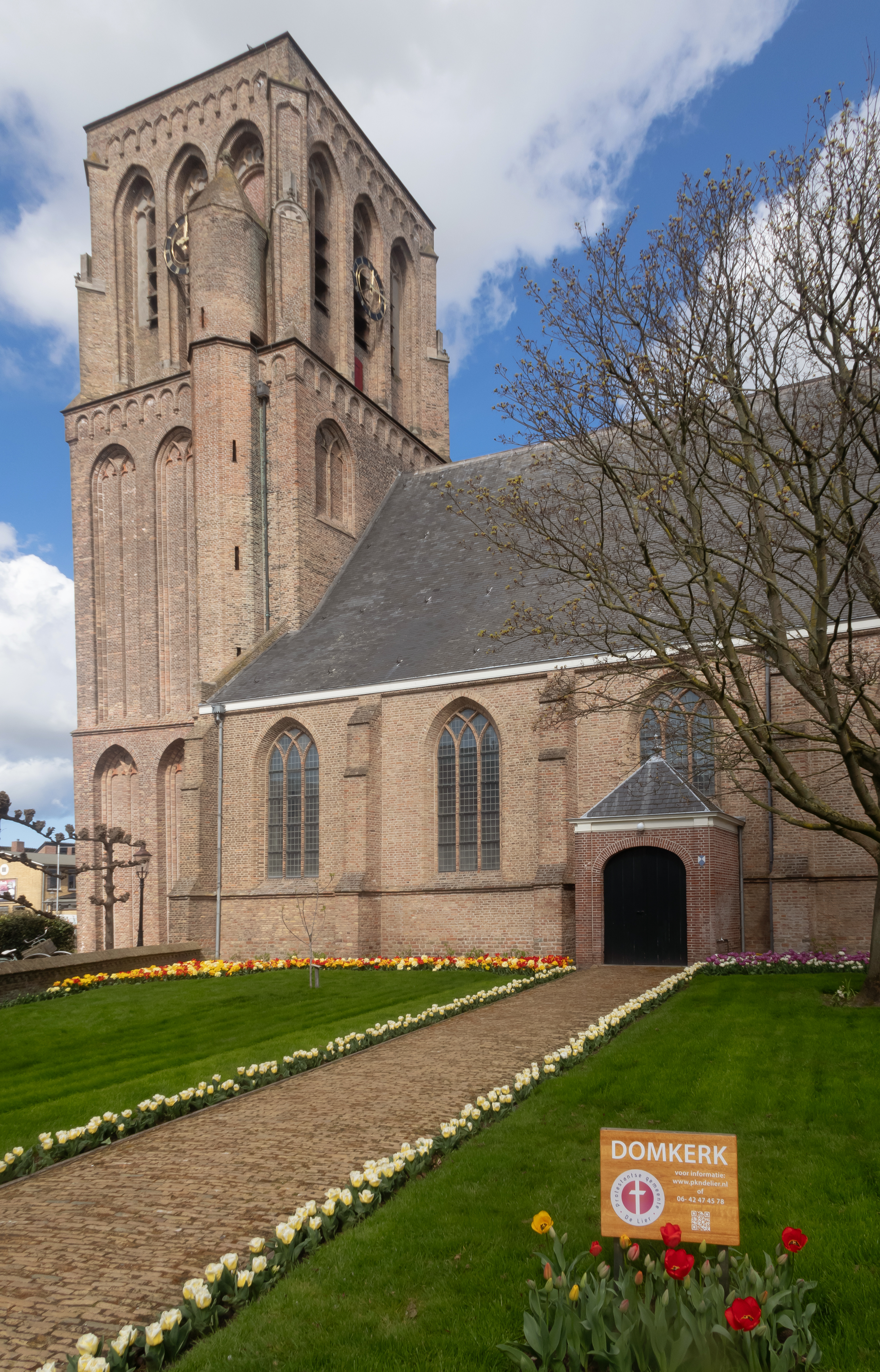
The Lierse Dom
