= Den Hoorn, South Holland =

Den Hoorn
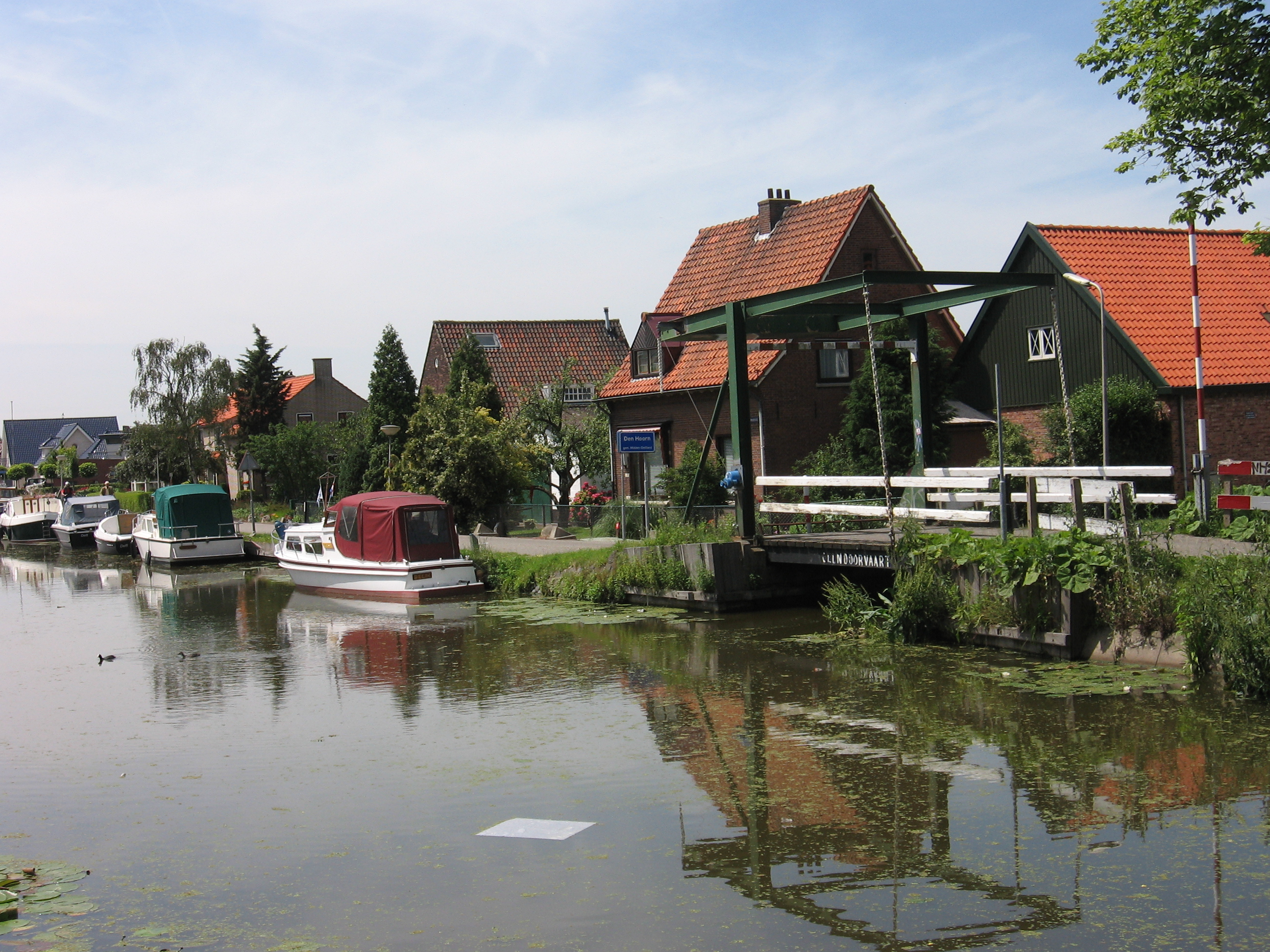
- Hoornsekade
- Interactive map of Den Hoorn
- Coordinates: 52°0′5″N 4°19′54″E
- Country: Netherlands
- Province: South Holland
- Municipality: Midden-Delfland

Population (1 January 2017)
  - Total: 8,041

Den Hoorn is a village in the southwest of the Netherlands, near the city Delft. On 1 January 2017, population counted 8041 people.

There are three primary schools in Den Hoorn. Every August they have the Varend Corso (translated: Floating Corso).

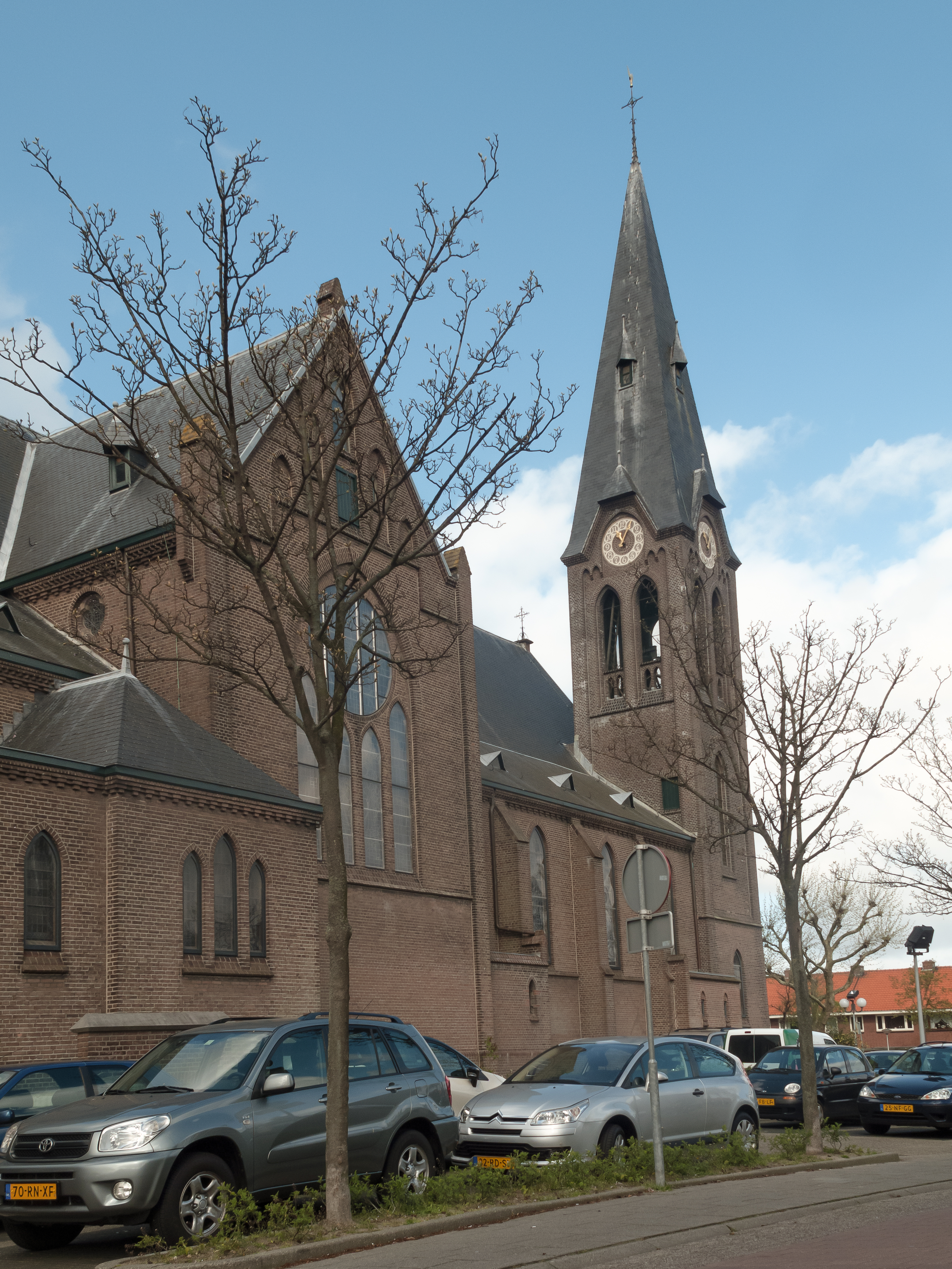
Den Hoorn, church: de Sint Antonius-en Corneliuskerk
