= Midden-Delfland =

- Municipality
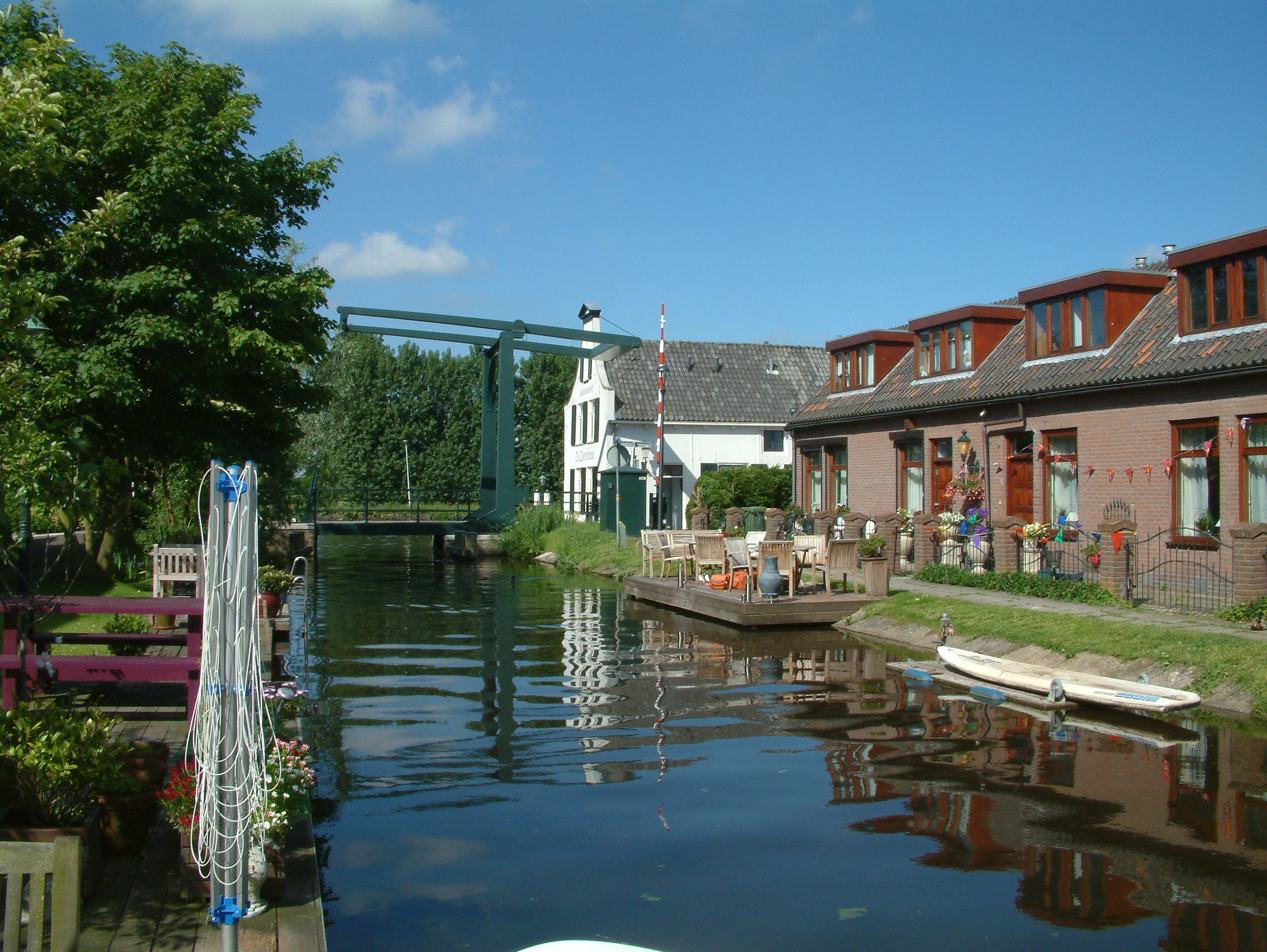
- Canal through Zweth

- Flag Coat of arms

- Location in South Holland
- Coordinates: 51°59′N 4°19′E
- Country: Netherlands
- Province: South Holland
- Established: 1 January 2004

Government
  - Body: Municipal council
  - Mayor: Arnoud Rodenburg (CDA)

Area
  - Total: 49.38 km^{2} (19.07 sq mi)
  - Land: 47.19 km^{2} (18.22 sq mi)
  - Water: 2.19 km^{2} (0.85 sq mi)
- Elevation: −2 m (−6.6 ft)

Population (January 2021)
  - Total: 19,414
  - Density: 411/km^{2} (1,060/sq mi)
- Time zone: UTC+1 (CET)
  - Summer (DST): UTC+2 (CEST)
- Postcode: 2635–2636, 3155
- Area code: 010, 015
- Website: www.middendelfland.nl

Midden-Delfland (Dutch: [ˌmɪdə(n)ˈdɛl(ə)flɑnt]) is a municipality (gemeente) in the Westland region in the province of South Holland in the Netherlands. It had a population of 19,414 in 2021, and covers an area of 49.38 km^{2} (19.07 sq mi) of which 2.19 km^{2} (0.85 sq mi) is water.

It was formed on 1 January 2004 through the merger of the former municipalities:

- Maasland (population: 6,844), covered an area of 24.42 km^{2} (9.43 sq mi) of which 0.6 km^{2} (0.23 sq mi) water.
- Schipluiden (population: 11,173), covered an area of 30.00 km^{2} (11.58 sq mi) of which 0.39 km^{2} (0.15 sq mi) water.

== Population centres ==
The municipality comprises the population centres:

- Hodenpijl
- Den Hoorn
- Gaag
- Maasland
- Negenhuizen
- Schipluiden
- 't Woudt
- Zouteveen
- Zweth

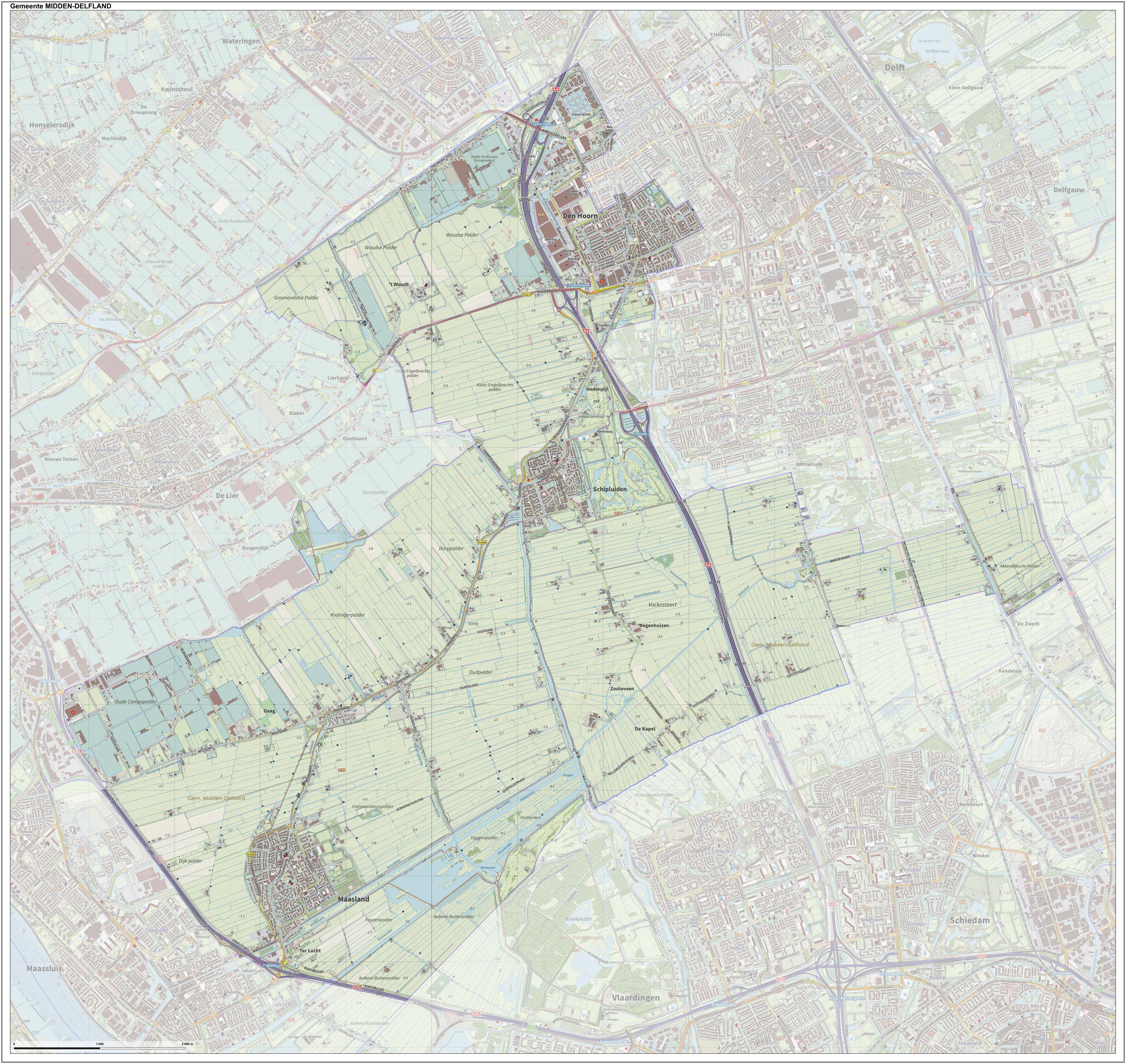
Topographic map of the municipality of Midden-Delfland, June 2015

== Geography ==
The green area that comprises the municipality of Midden-Delfland was named Midden-Delfland before 2004, and it referred to the green area surrounded by cities (such as The Hague and Rotterdam) and the horticulture area of Westland. The supporters of a continuous green area were lucky that the municipality of Midden-Delfland became a reality: the cities of Delft, Vlaardingen and Schiedam wanted to build new houses here, and the Westland gardeners also wanted to expand. Now, Midden-Delfland is designated as a recreation area for people from the surrounding cities.

== Notable people ==
- Jan Vermeer van Utrecht (1630 in Schipluiden – ca. 1696) a Dutch Golden Age painter
- Marja van Bijsterveldt (born 1961) a Dutch politician, Mayor of Delft since 2016
- IJsbrand Chardon (born 1961) a Dutch equestrian and winner at the World Equestrian Games
- Ronald Vuijk (born 1965) a Dutch politician, alderman of Midden-Delfland 2011/2012
- Gerben Moerman (born 1976 in Schipluiden) a Dutch sociologist and academic

== Gallery ==
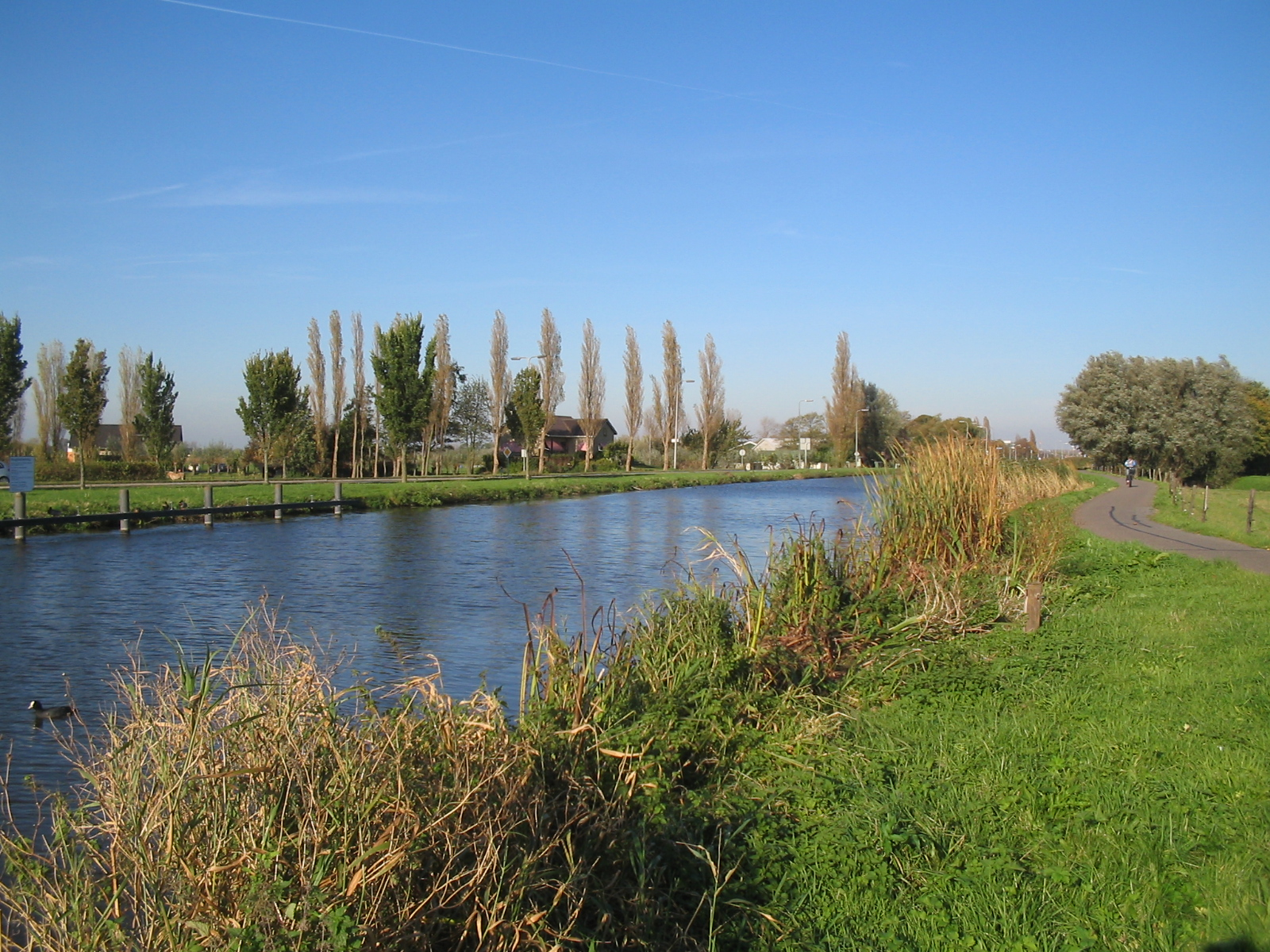
Schipluiden - Gaag

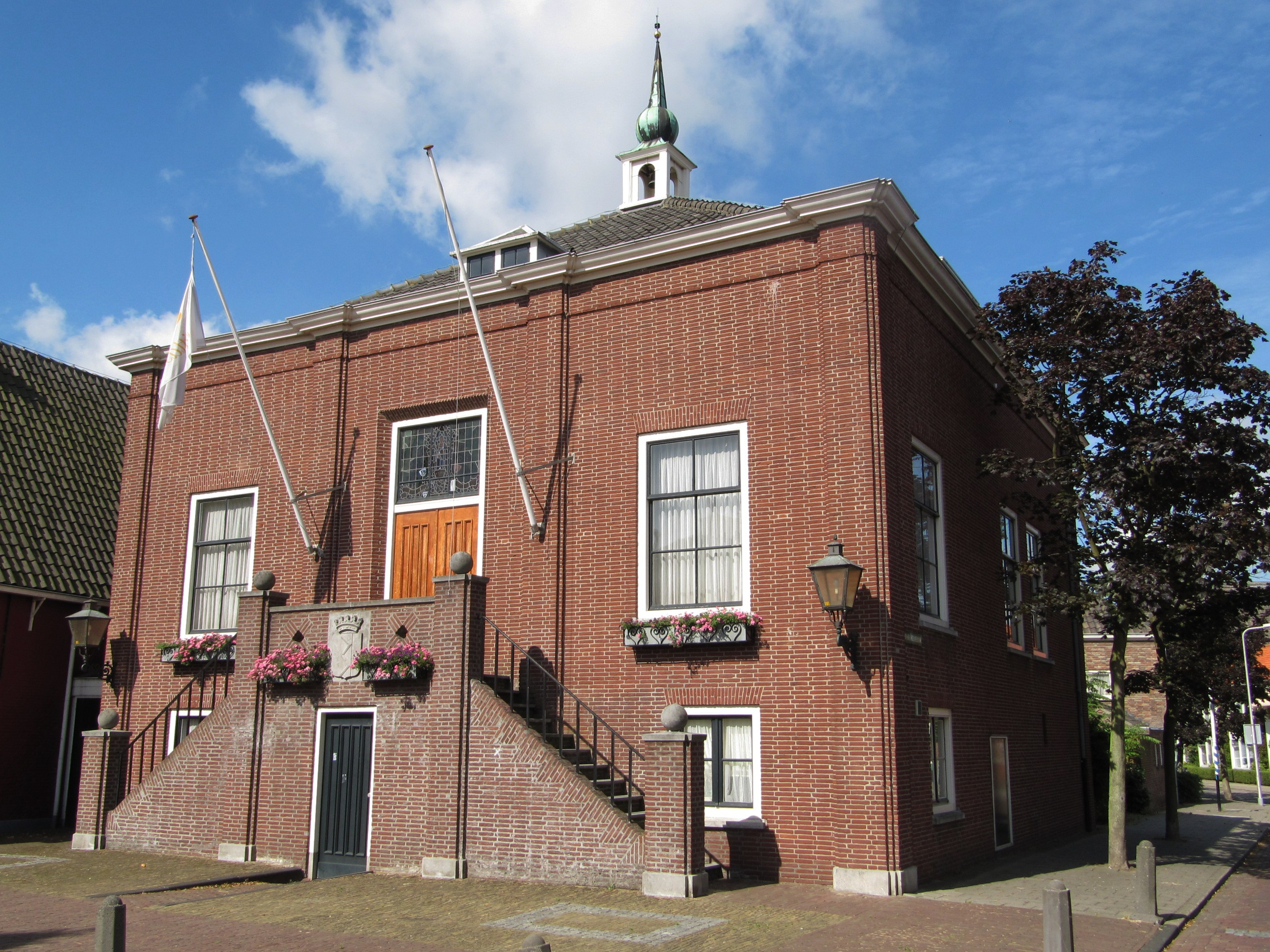
Maasland - Former city hall

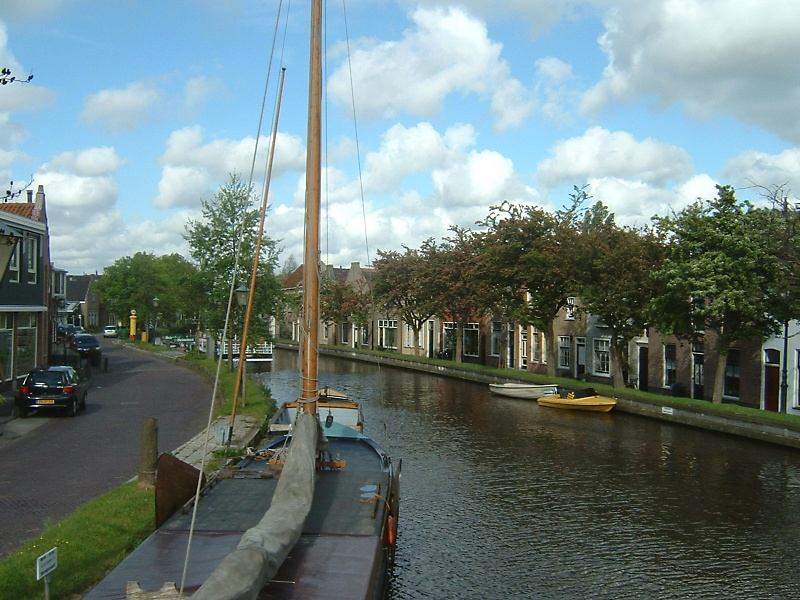
Schipluiden

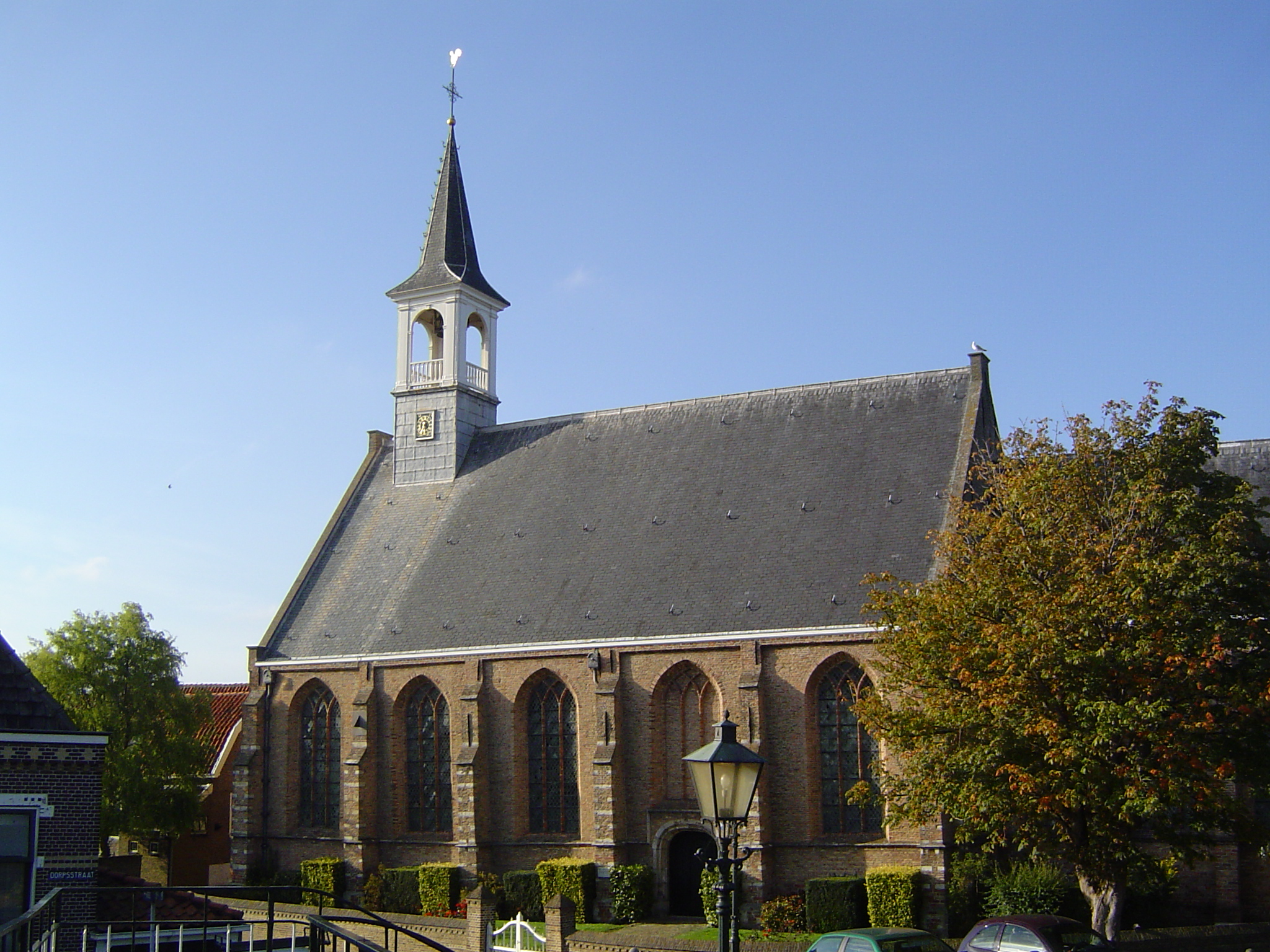
Hervormde Kerk Schipluiden

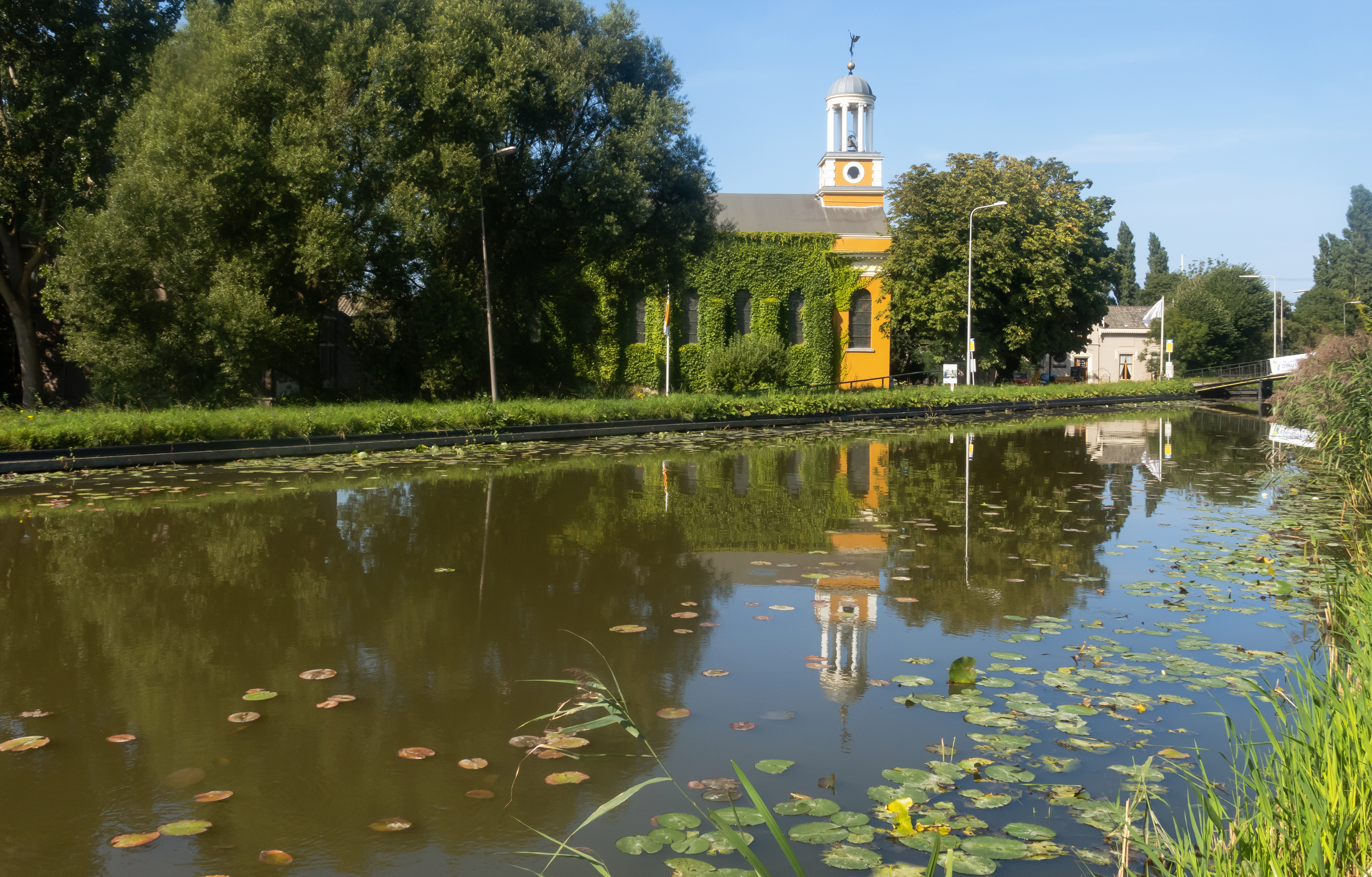
Hodenpijl, former church

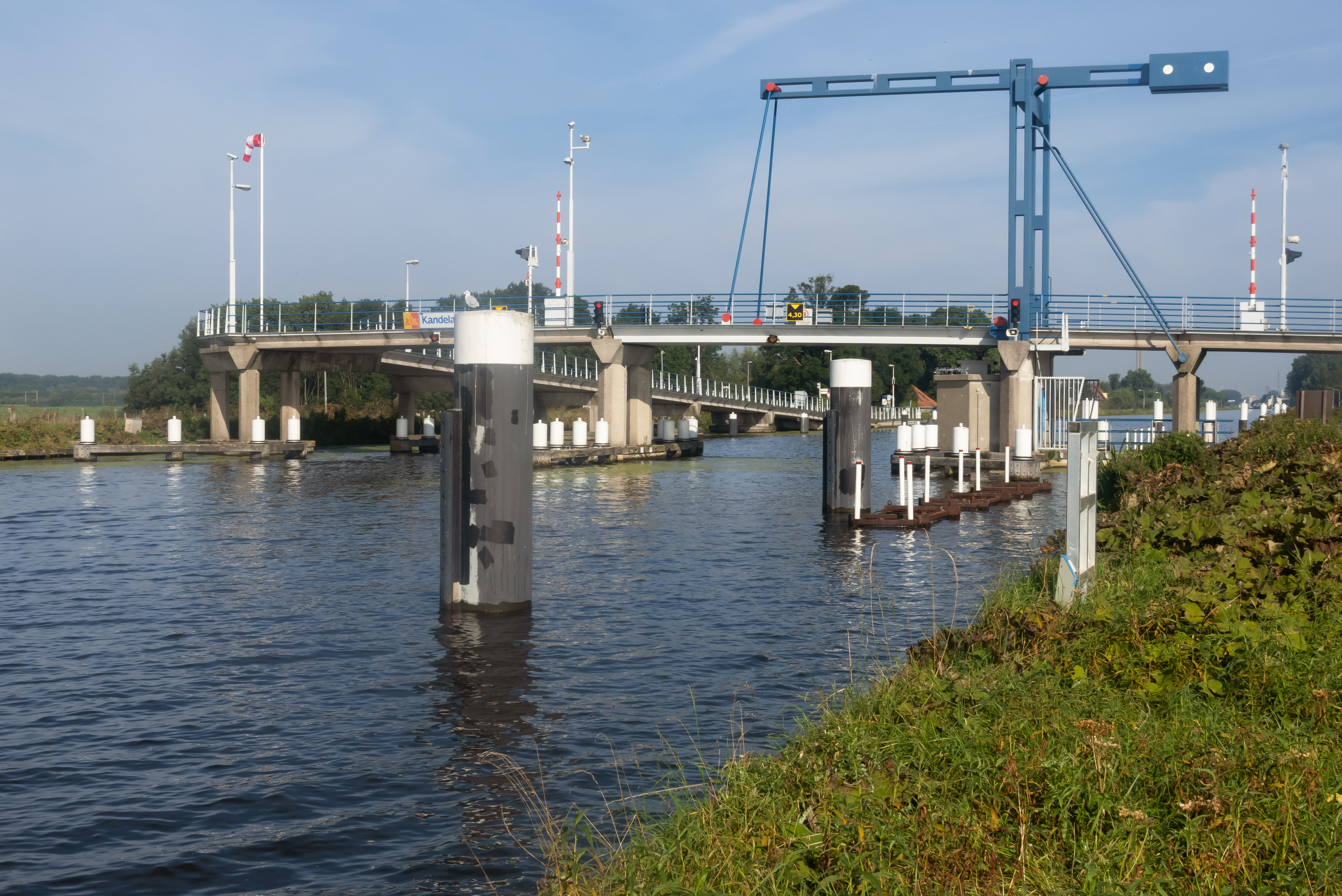
De Zweth, bridge: Kandelaarsbrug
