= Schipluiden =

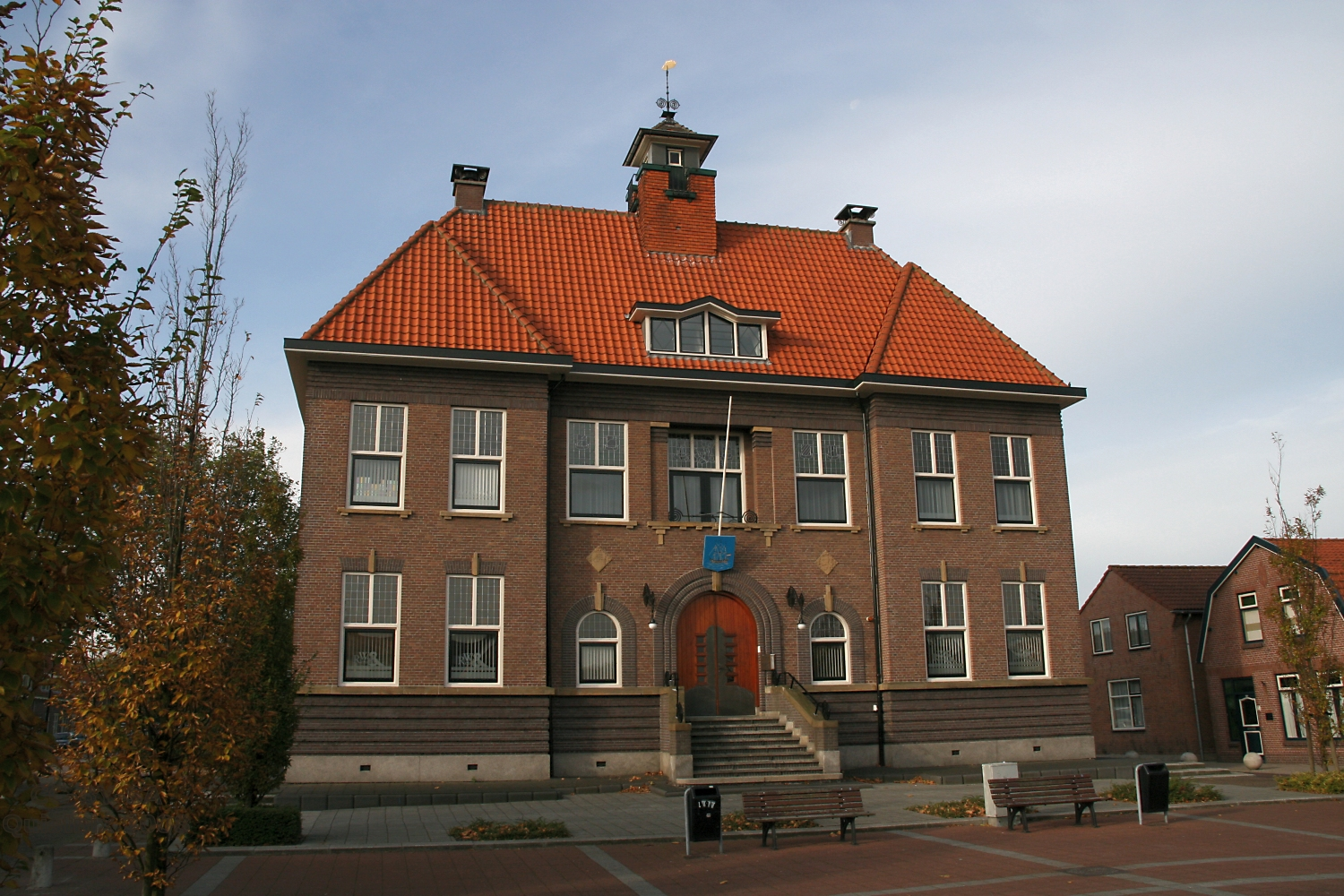
- Former city hall of Schipluiden

- Location of Schipluiden in the municipality of Midden-Delfland
- Coordinates: 51°58′35″N 4°18′53″E
- Country: Netherlands
- Province: South Holland
- Municipality: Midden-Delfland

Population (2009)
  - Total: 4.536

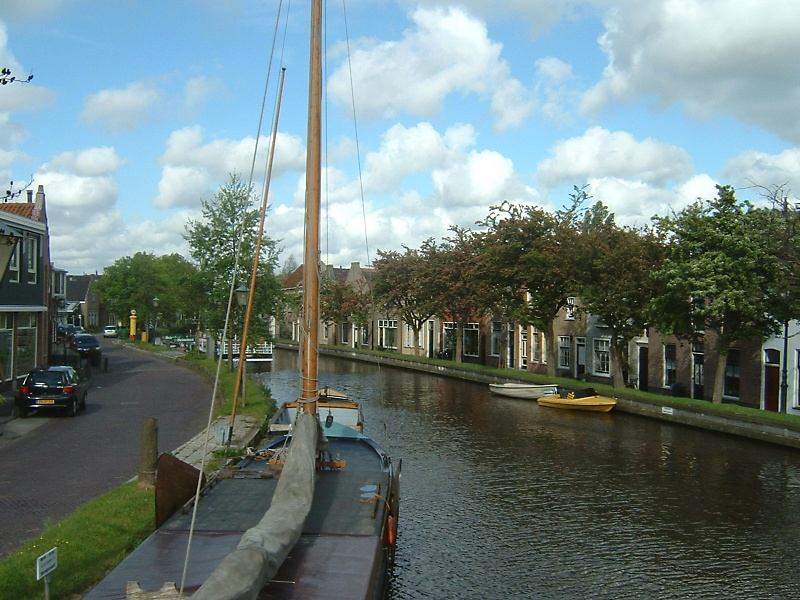
Schipluiden

Schipluiden is a village in the western Netherlands, in the province of South Holland. It is the seat of the council of the municipality of Midden-Delfland.

The village was founded relatively late in the 15th century and evolved around the Keenenburg castle, which no longer exists. The current Dutch Reformed church in the village centre belonged to the Catholic Teutonic Knights before 1572, when the Calvinists took over control of the church. The village inhabitants worked in the food trade from the agrarian area Westland to the cities of Vlaardingen and Delft. Most of the population became Roman Catholic in the 17th century. For sermons, they had to go to the Roman Catholic Church, some kilometres out of the village.

In 1855, the municipality of Sint Maartensregt was merged into Schipluiden.

A new Roman Catholic church was built in the 1960s. Schipluiden remained a small agrarian village until the 1950s. Its population began to grow significantly in the second half of the twentieth century as many middle-class people from the cities came to live in the village, but the village has maintained its village culture.

Schipluiden was a separate municipality until 2004, when it became part of Midden-Delfland.

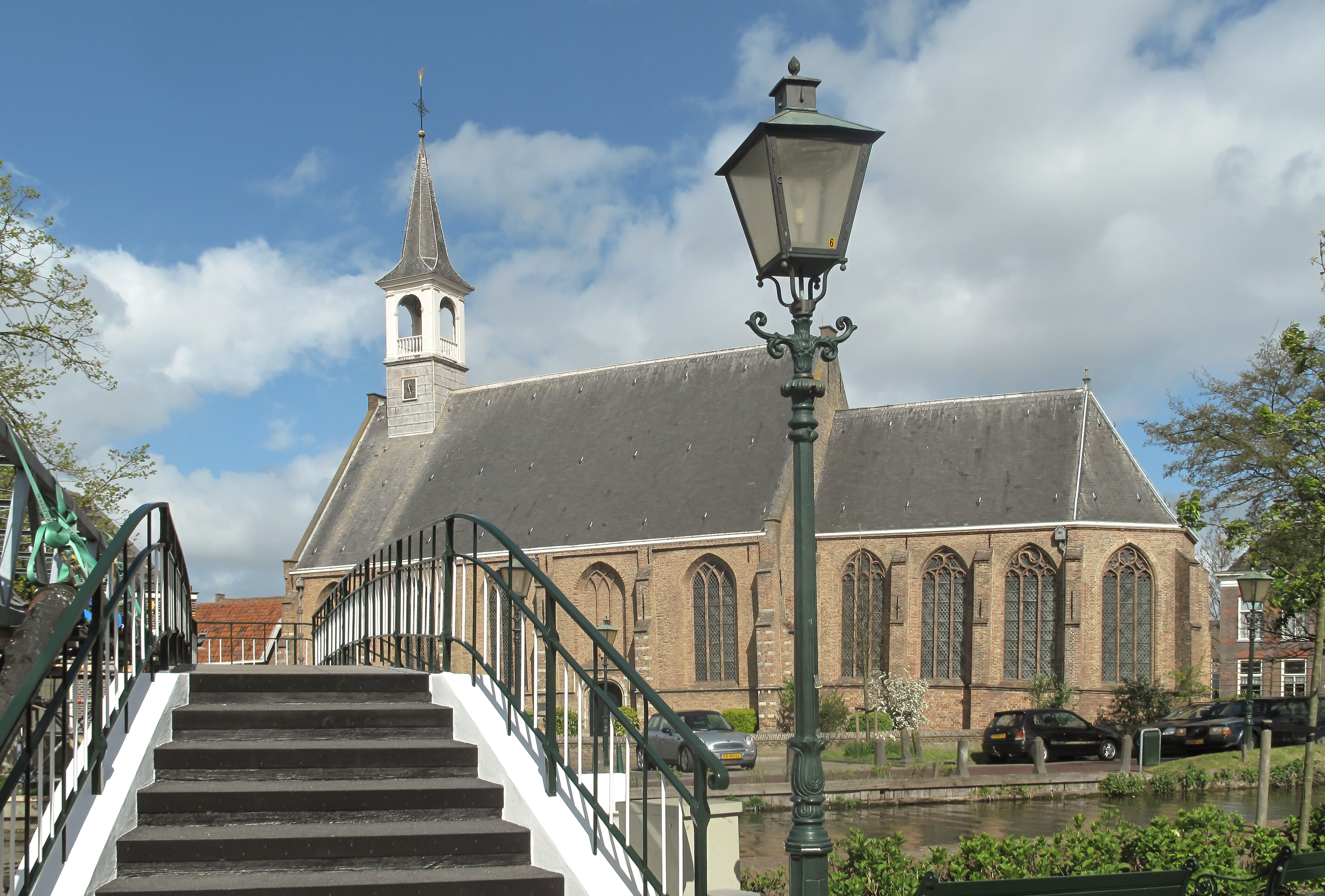
Reformed church

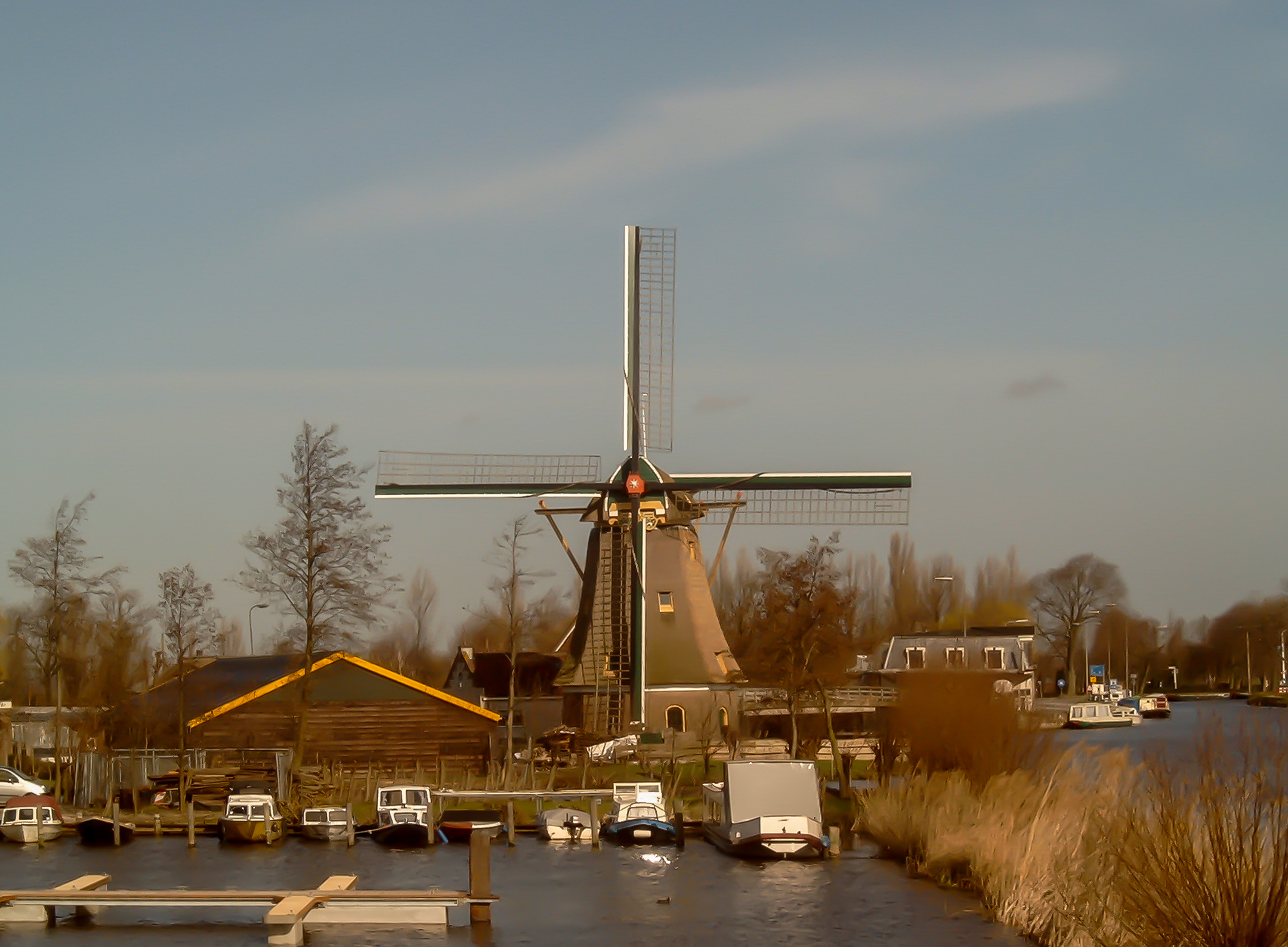
Windmill: de Korpershoek

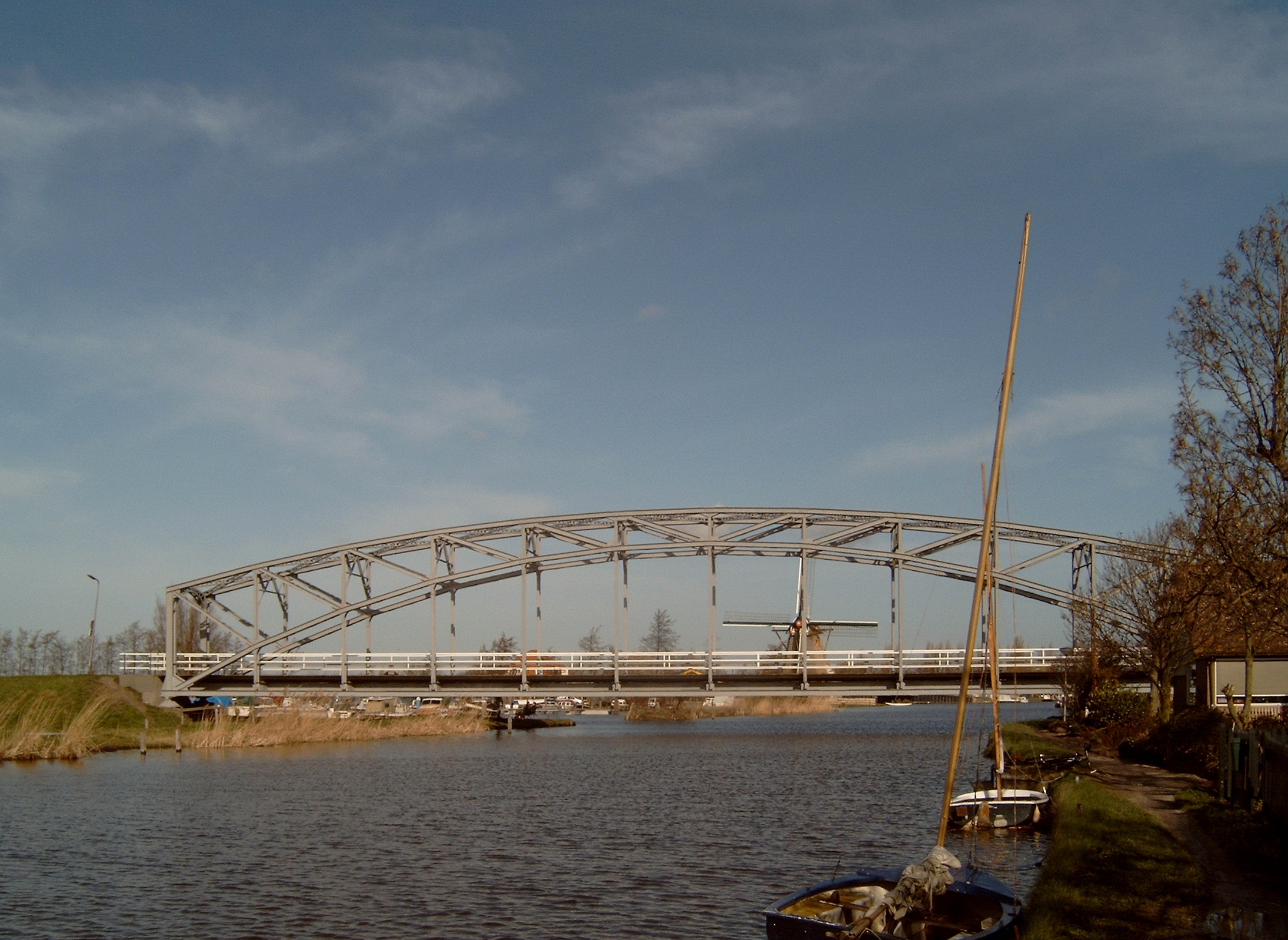
Bridge across the Vlaardingervaart
