= Naaldwijk =

Town in South Holland, Netherlands

- Town
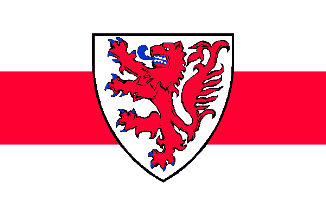
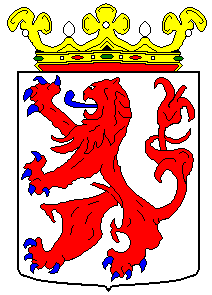
- Flag Coat of arms

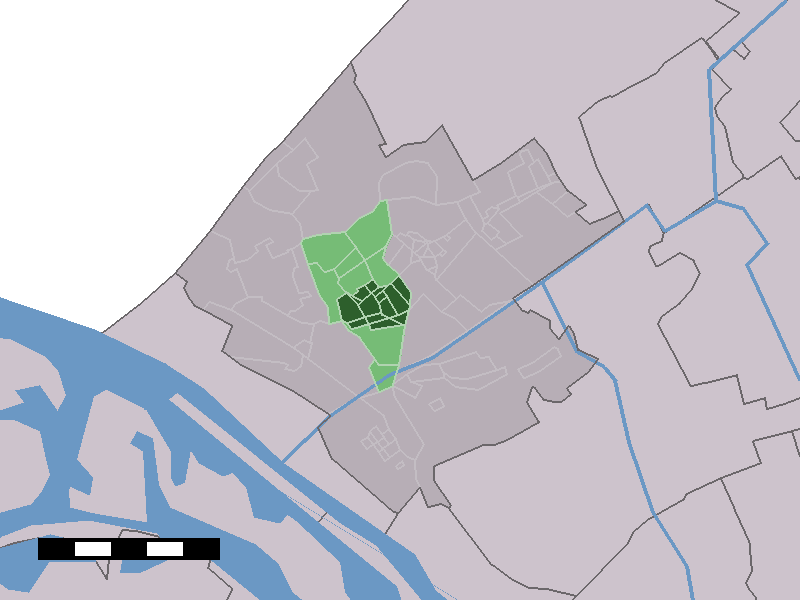
- The village (dark green) and the statistical district (light green) of Naaldwijk in the municipality of Westland.

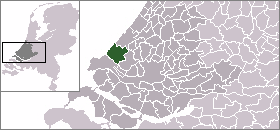
- Coordinates: 51°59′35″N 4°12′18″E
- Country: Netherlands
- Province: South Holland
- Municipality: Westland

Population (January 2011)
  - Total: 18,858
- Postal code: 2670-2673
- Dialing code: 0174
- Major roads: N213

Naaldwijk (Dutch pronunciation: [ˈnaːltʋɛik]) is a town in the Dutch province of South Holland. It is a part of the municipality of Westland, and lies about 10 km (6 miles) southwest of The Hague.

Naaldwijk lies in the heart of Westland. The largest economic sector is greenhouse horticulture. The largest flower auction site in the world, operated by FloraHolland, can be found in the nearby village of Honselersdijk.

Naaldwijk was previously a municipality in its own right, covering an area of 25.33 km^{2} (9¾ sq. mi.) (of which 0.23 km^{2}; 57 acres water). It included the towns Honselersdijk and Maasdijk.

On 1 January 2004 the municipality of Naaldwijk was merged with the neighbouring municipalities De Lier, 's-Gravenzande, Monster, and Wateringen to create the municipality of Westland. Naaldwijk is now the administrative capital of Westland.

The village of "Naaldwijk" has a population of around 15,440. The statistical area "Naaldwijk", which also can include the surrounding countryside, has a population of around 17,370.

== Areas and neighbourhoods ==
- Galgenblok
- Opstal
- Woerdblok (Waterwijk, Zandstrand, Zandheuvel, Waterrijk)
- Pijletuinen
- Kruisbroek
- Geestcomplex
- Hoogeland
- Floriëndaal

== Image gallery ==
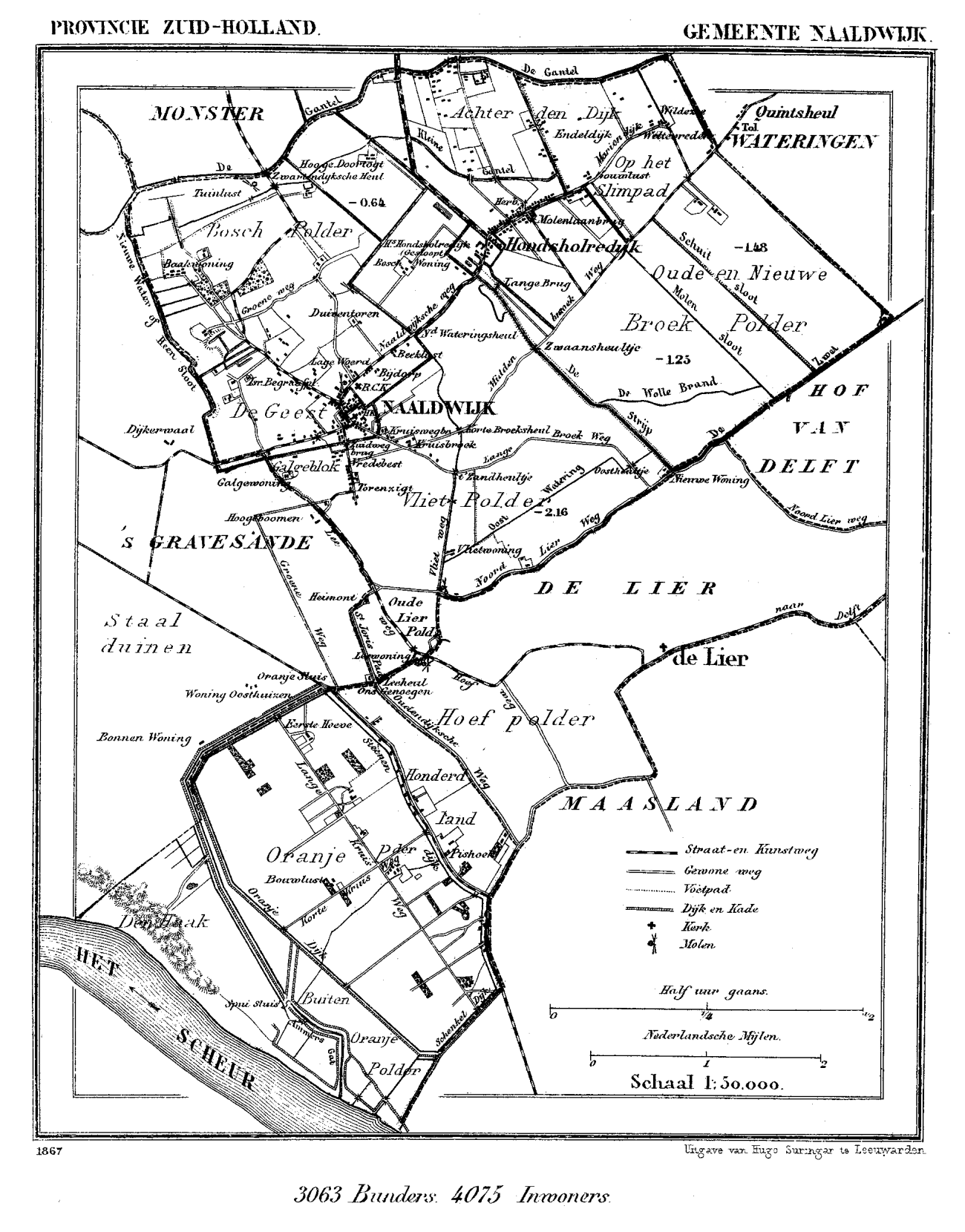
Naaldwijk in 1867

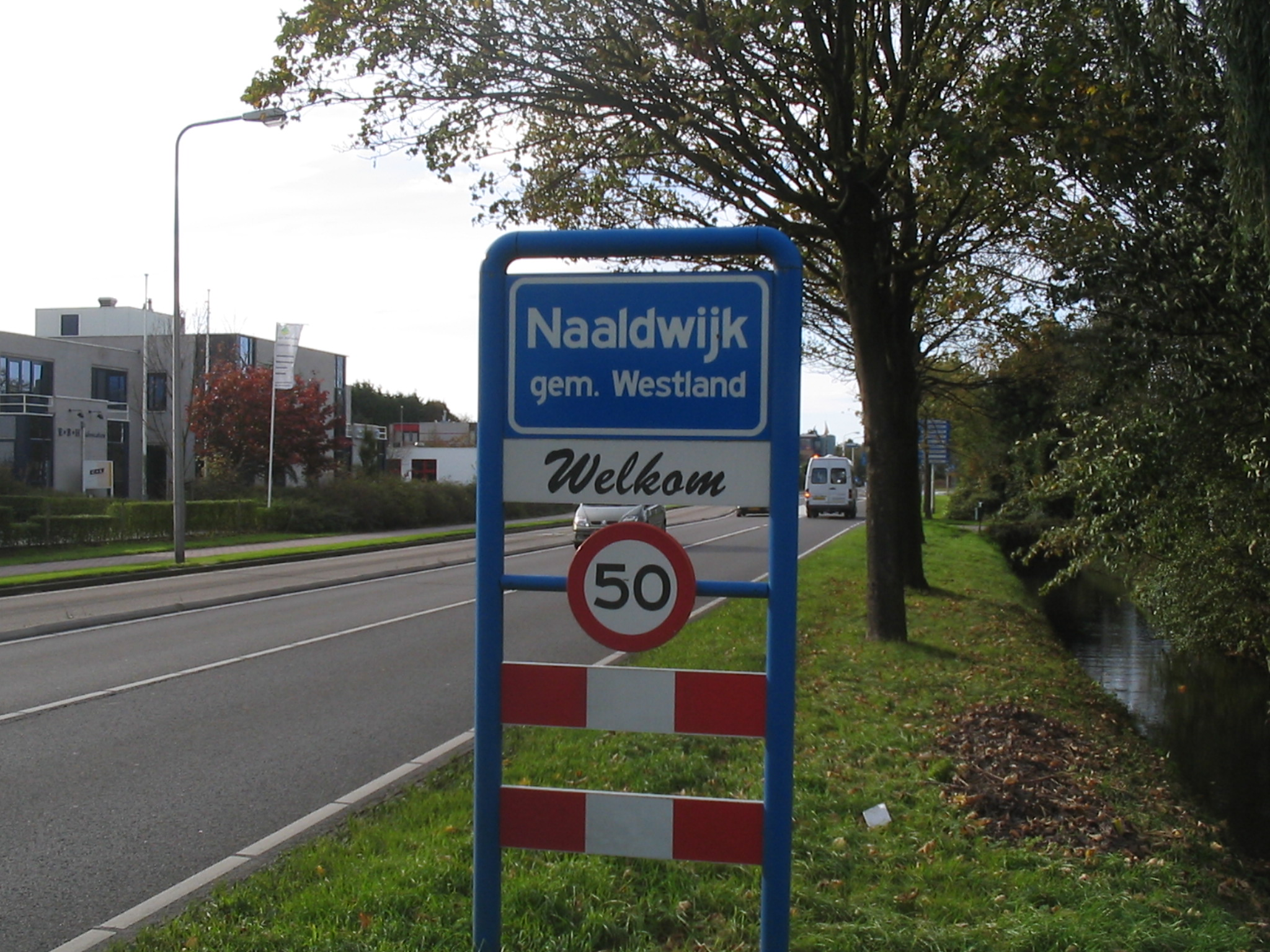
Welcome sign

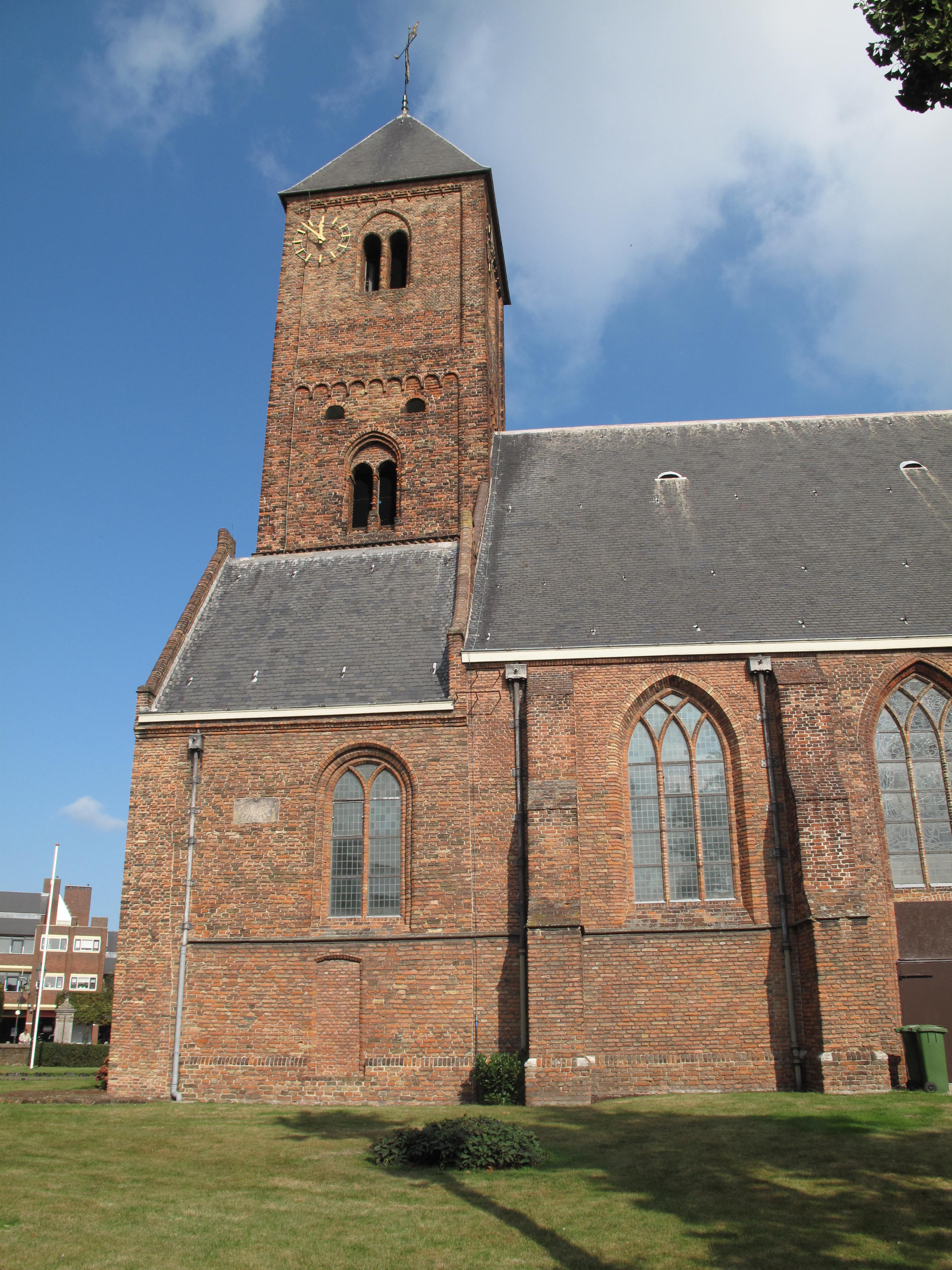
De Oude Kerk

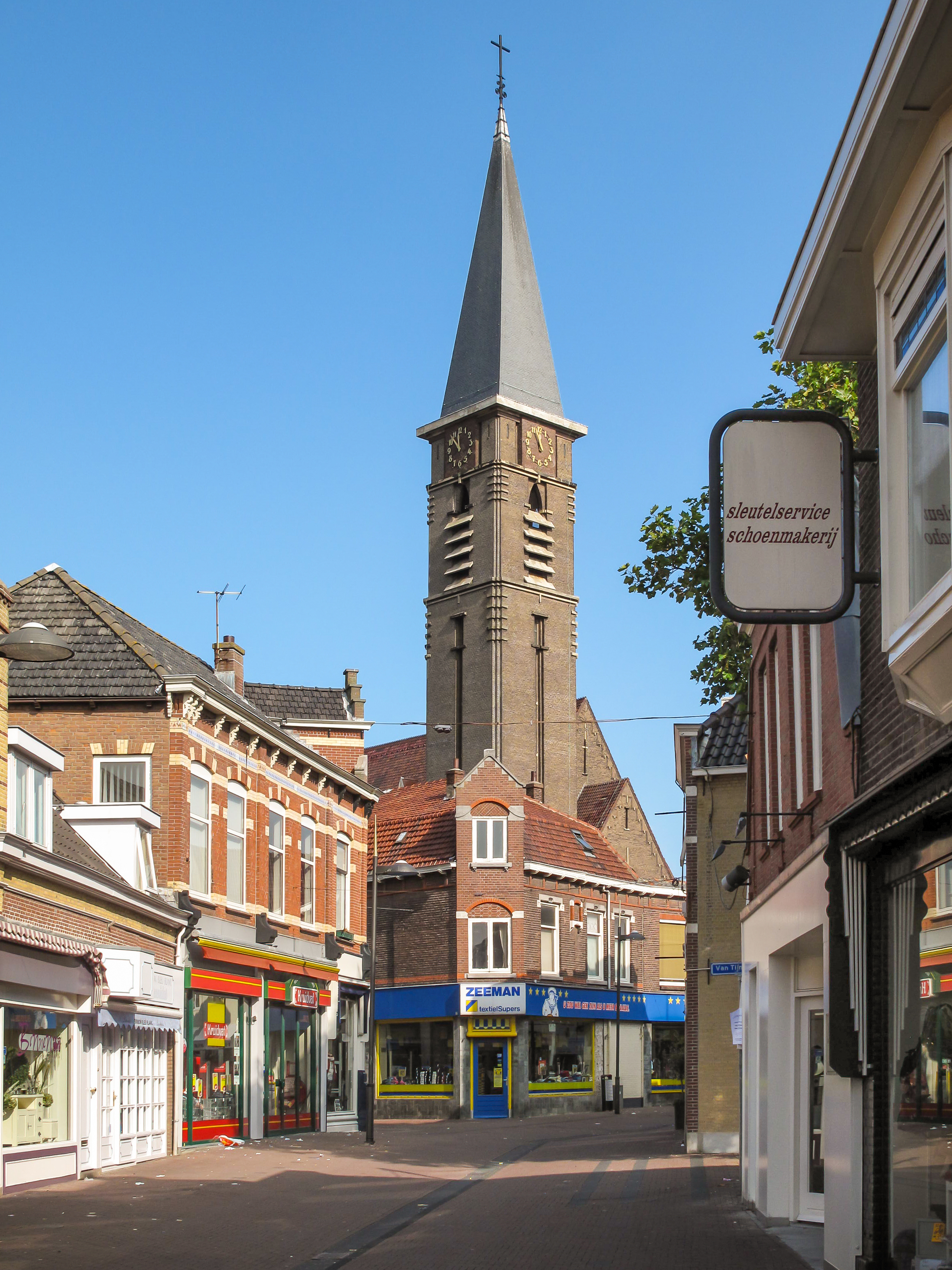
Sint Adrianus church

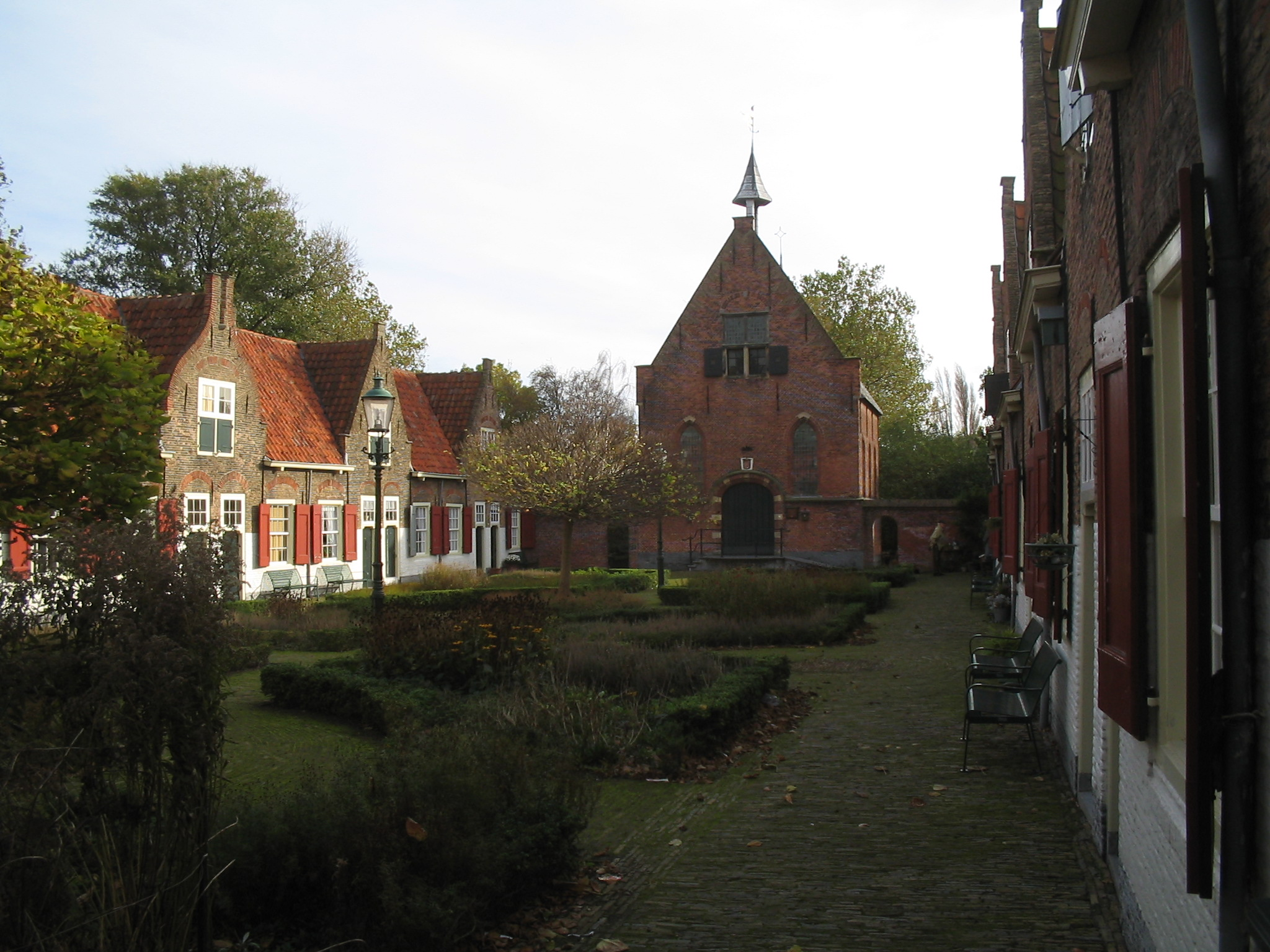
Heilige geesthof

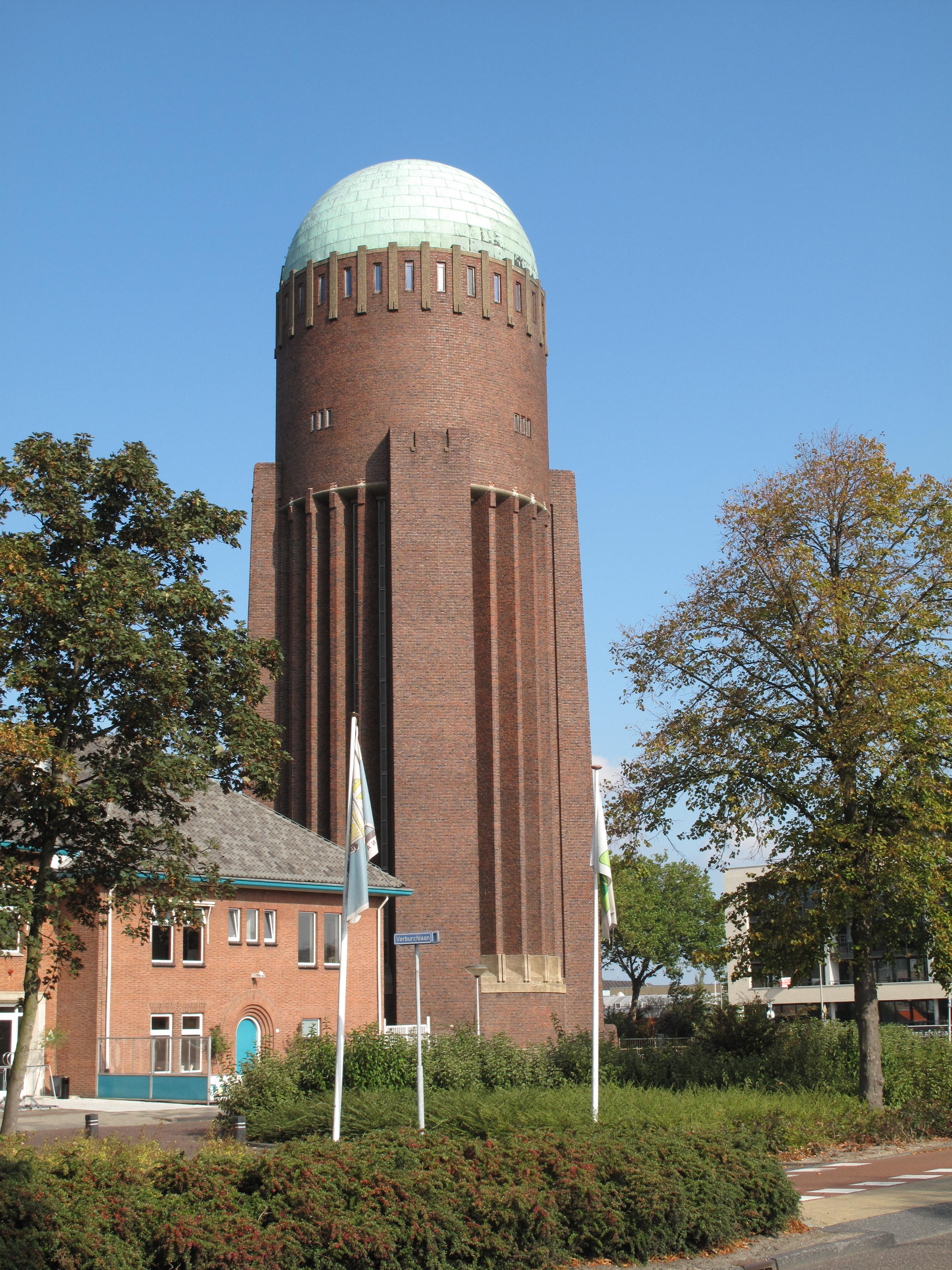
Watertower

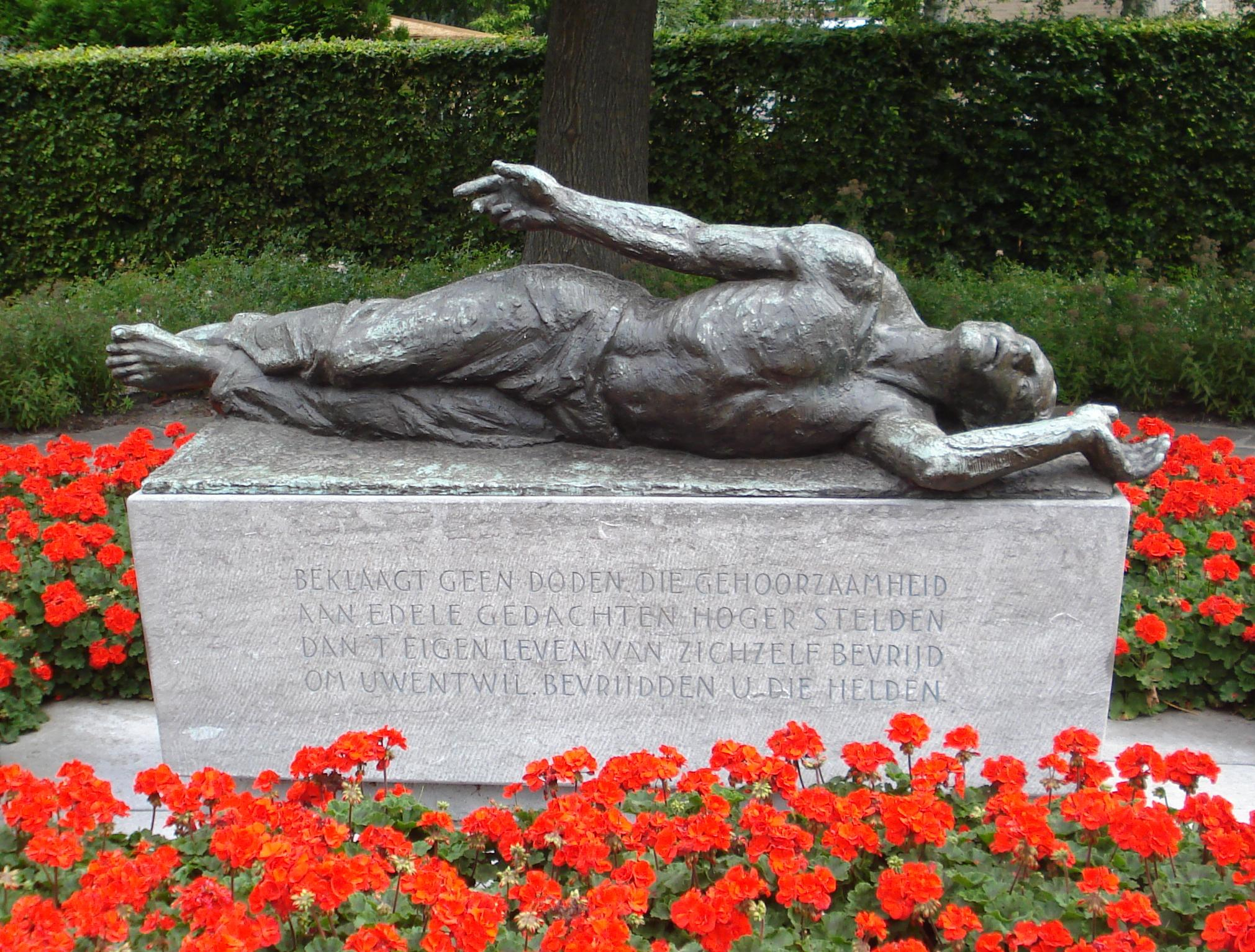
Monument voor de Gevallenen by Mari Andriessen
