= Monster, South Holland =

Monster
- Village
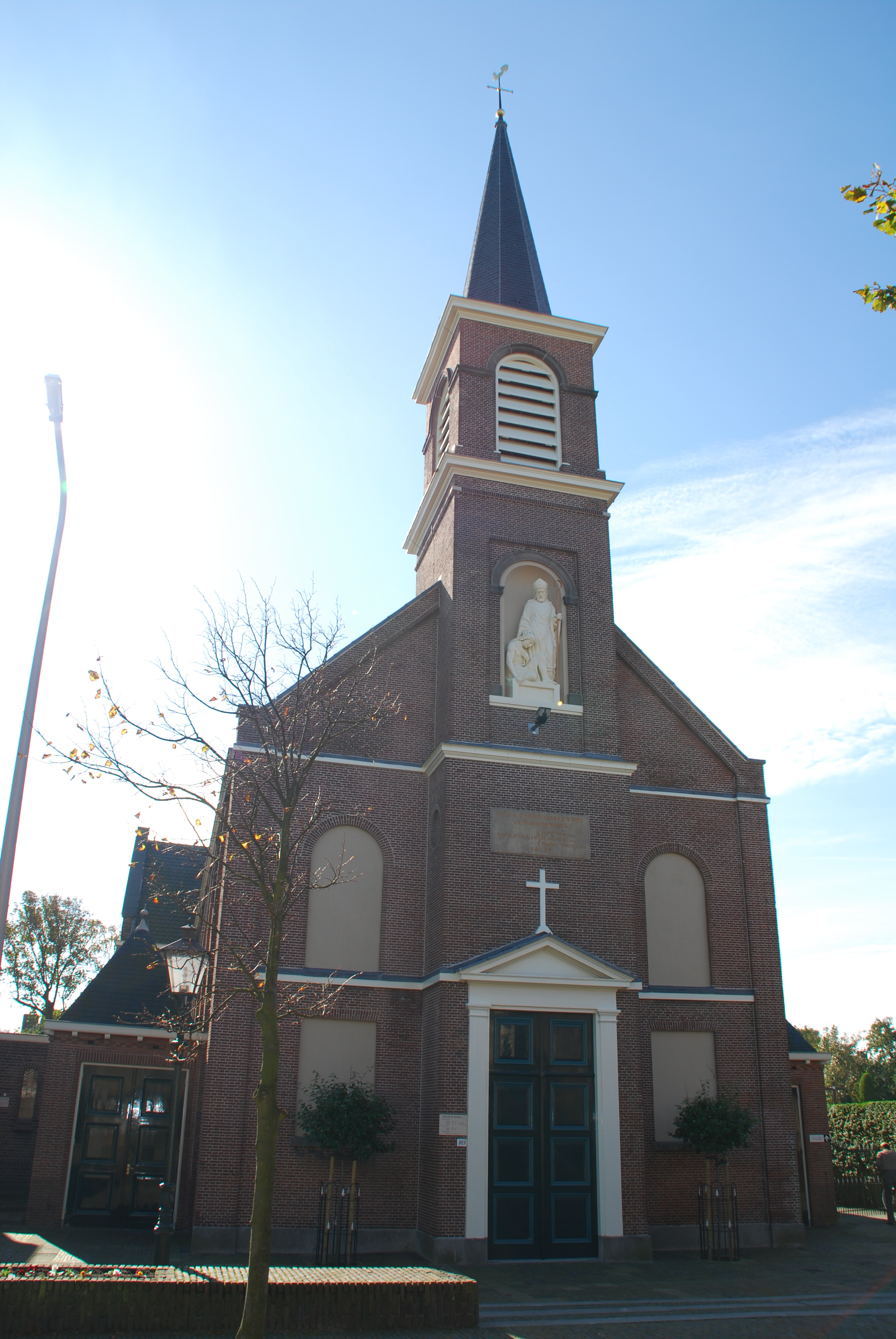
- Saint Machutus church (Monster)

- Flag Coat of arms

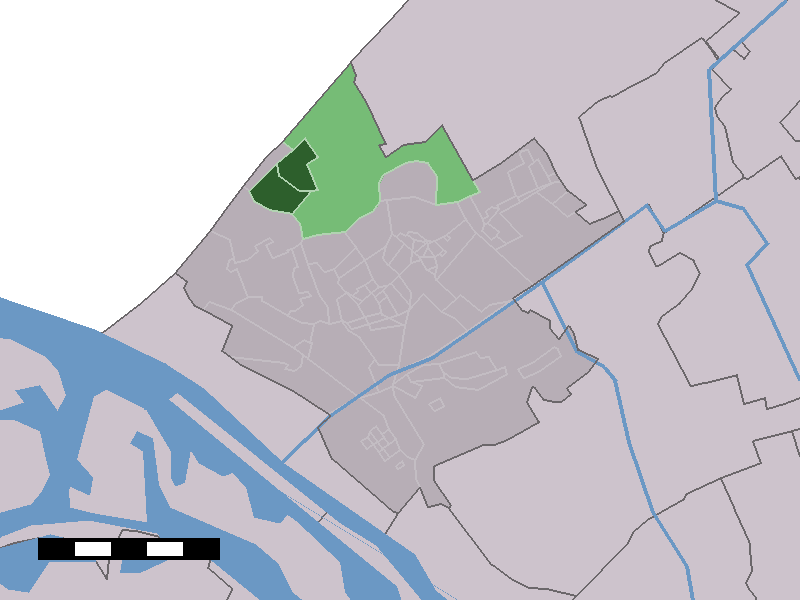
- Coordinates: 52°01′30″N 4°10′20″E
- Country: Netherlands
- Province: South Holland
- Municipality: Westland

Population
  - Total: 13,782
- Major roads: N211

Monster is a large village in the Dutch province of South Holland. It is a part of the municipality of Westland, and lies about 10 km (6.2 mi) south-west of The Hague.

The village of Monster has a population of around 11,580. The statistical area Monster, which also can include the surrounding countryside, has a population of around 14,540.

Until 2004 it was a separate municipality and covered an area of 20.15 km^{2} (7.78 sq mi) (of which 5.70 km^{2} (2.20 sq mi) is water).

The former municipality of Monster also included the villages Poeldijk and Ter Heijde. Monster and Ter Heijde are located near the North Sea coast and have popular beaches.

== History ==
In the 13th century a great deal of the Westland, Loosduinen and The Hague were administered by Monster. When The Hague came to be constructed, a split was made in Haag-ambacht and Half-Loosduinen. The latter village was separated from Monster in 1812. Remains of the former glory can still be seen between The Hague and Monster at such estates as Ockenburgh, Bloemendaal, Solleveld and Langeveld.

There is a great deal of uncertainty over the origin of the name "Monster". It is probably derived from the Latin monasterium, meaning monastery. The name was also used for the ground that belonged to a monastery. Another explanation was that Monster was derived from the old-Dutch word monster, which meant amongst others "big church" (from Latin: monstrum), which is supported by the fact that Monster had in those days one of the largest churches in the area.

Monster was previously a destination for pilgrimage, because Machutus parish possessed some relics of its patron Machutus, who is also known as Machuut. People came to be healed of the "falling sickness", which was possibly epilepsy.

== Economy ==
Monsters' economy is built around greenhouse horticulture and beach-tourism.

== Notable people ==
- John I, Lord of Polanen (c. 1285–1342), Lord of Polanen, De Lek and Breda
- Arnold Vinnius (1588–1657), jurist
- Gerard Schouw (born 1965), politician
- Arantxa Rus (born 1990), tennis player
- Yvette Broch (b.1990), handball player
- Kay Huisman (born 1997), short track speed skater

== Image gallery ==
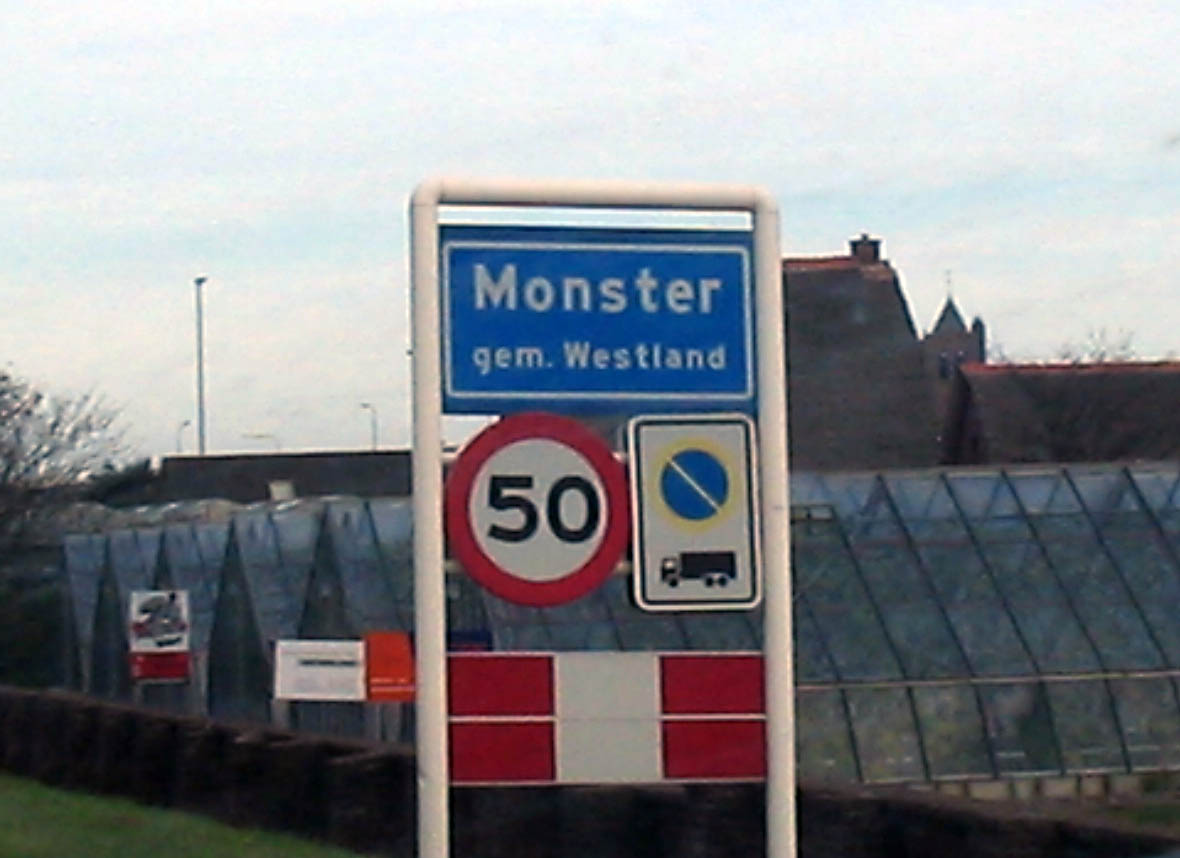
Monster

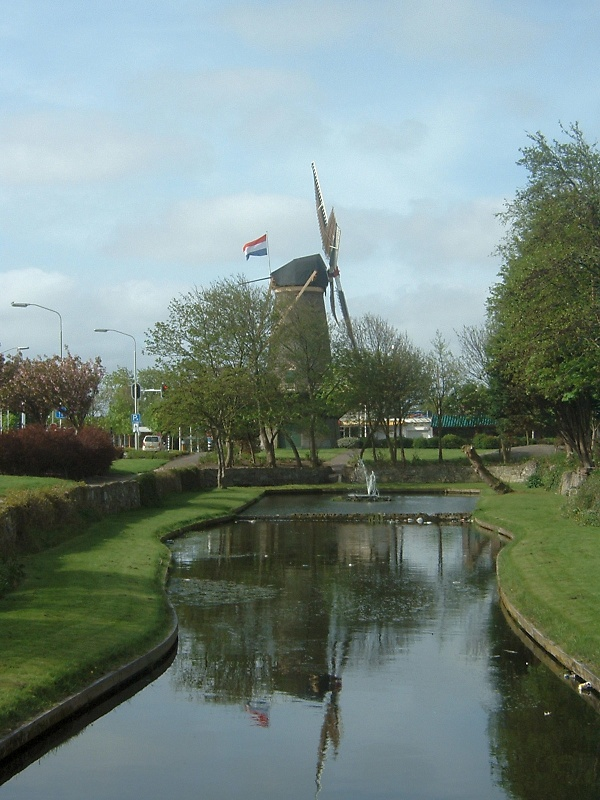
Windmill "The four winds"

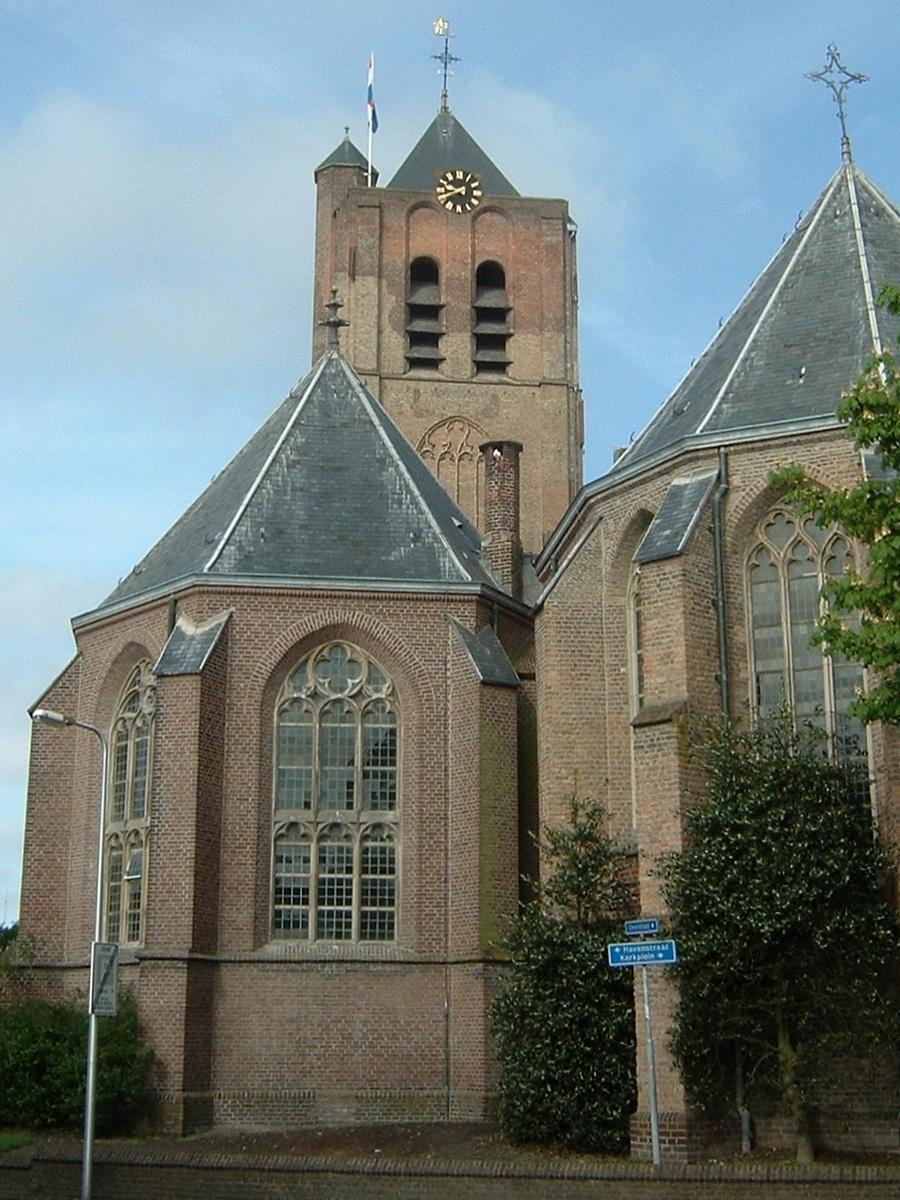
Church of Monster

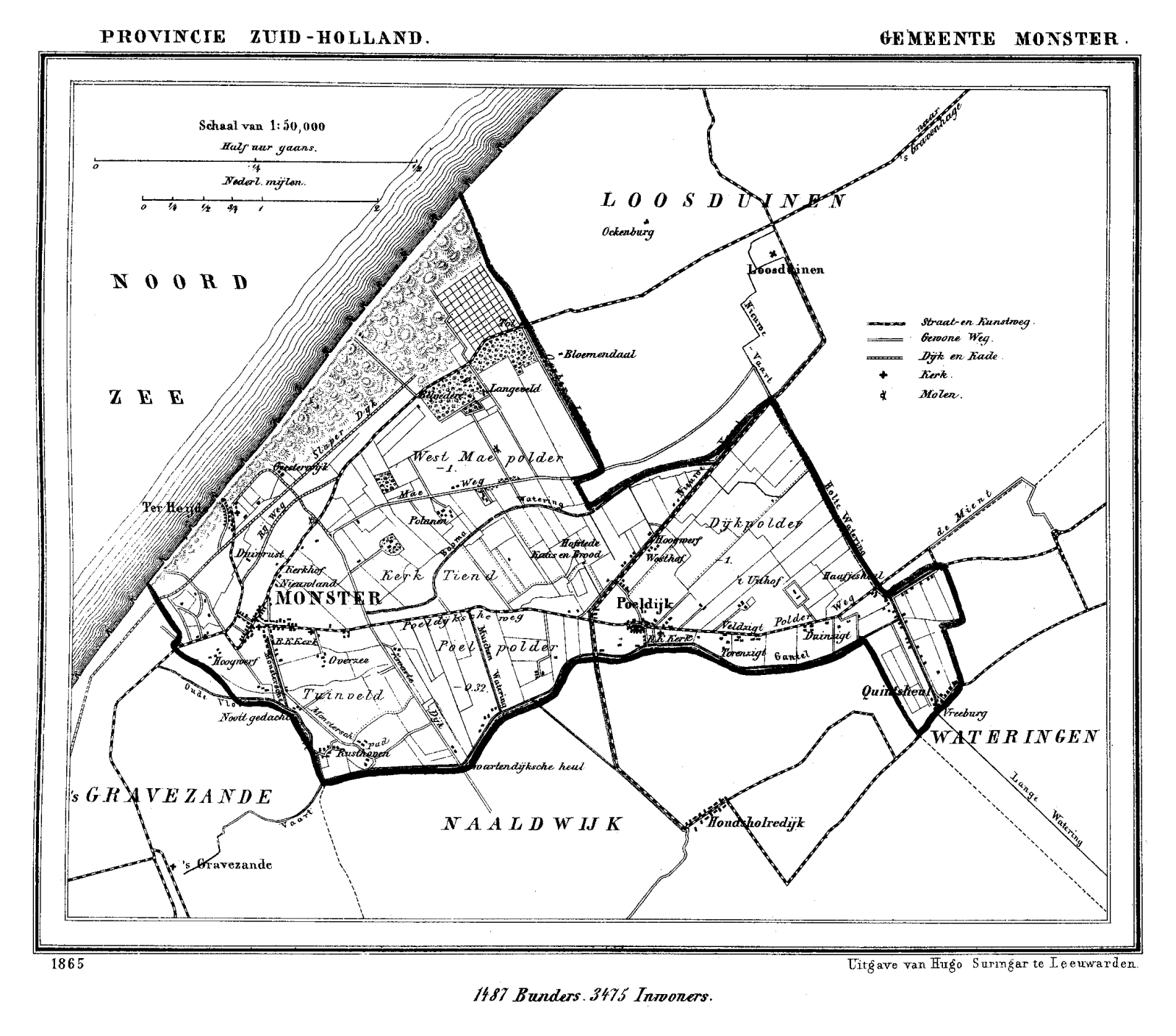
Monster in 1865
