= Westland (municipality), Netherlands =

Westland
- Municipality
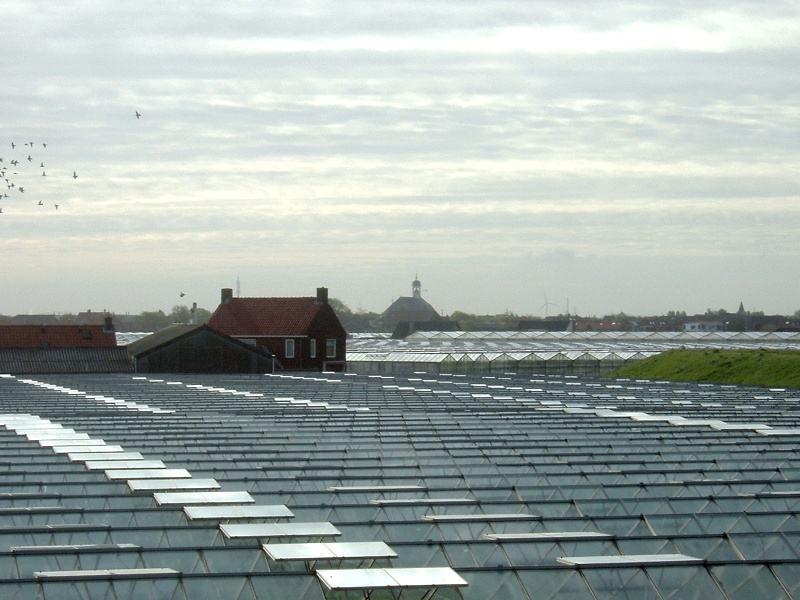
- Greenhouses near 's-Gravenzande

- Flag Coat of arms

- Location in South Holland
- Coordinates: 52°0′N 4°13′E
- Country: Netherlands
- Province: South Holland
- Established: 1 January 2004

Government
  - Body: Municipal council
  - Mayor: Bouke Arends (PvdA)

Area
  - Total: 90.74 km^{2} (35.03 sq mi)
  - Land: 81.27 km^{2} (31.38 sq mi)
  - Water: 9.47 km^{2} (3.66 sq mi)
- Elevation: 1 m (3.3 ft)

Population (January 2021)
  - Total: 111,382
  - Density: 1,371/km^{2} (3,550/sq mi)
- Demonym: Westlander
- Time zone: UTC+1 (CET)
  - Summer (DST): UTC+2 (CEST)
- Postcode: 2290–2295, 2670–2694
- Area code: 0174
- Website: www.gemeentewestland.nl

Westland (Dutch pronunciation: [ˈʋɛstlɑnt]) is a municipality in the western Netherlands, in the province of South Holland. It covers an area of 90.74 km^{2} (35.03 sq mi) of which 9.47 km^{2} (3.66 sq mi) is covered by water and had a population of 111,382 in 2021.

Towns and other settlements: De Lier, 's-Gravenzande, Monster, Naaldwijk, Wateringen, Heenweg, Honselersdijk, Kwintsheul, Maasdijk, Poeldijk, and Ter Heijde.

== History ==
Westland was created on 1 January 2004 by a merger of the municipalities De Lier, 's-Gravenzande, Monster, Naaldwijk and Wateringen. These are also the names of five of the settlements. The others are Heenweg, Honselersdijk, Kwintsheul, Maasdijk, Poeldijk, and Ter Heijde. Westland itself is not the name of a settlement or town, but rather of the region. The City Hall is located in the middle of Westland, in Naaldwijk, the second largest settlement in Westland.

The town of Honselersdijk also possesses the largest Flower Auction, FloraHolland, which also has a location in Rijnsburg. This is a very important sector of the Westland economy. Flowers produced in Westland are sold all over the world.

Coastal towns are Ter Heijde (near Monster), Monster itself and 's-Gravenzande. These towns are popular with Germans and people from the Eastern Netherlands. It is not unknown for every holiday campsite to be fully booked with tourists because of their relative proximity to the more popular Scheveningen.

== Wider area ==
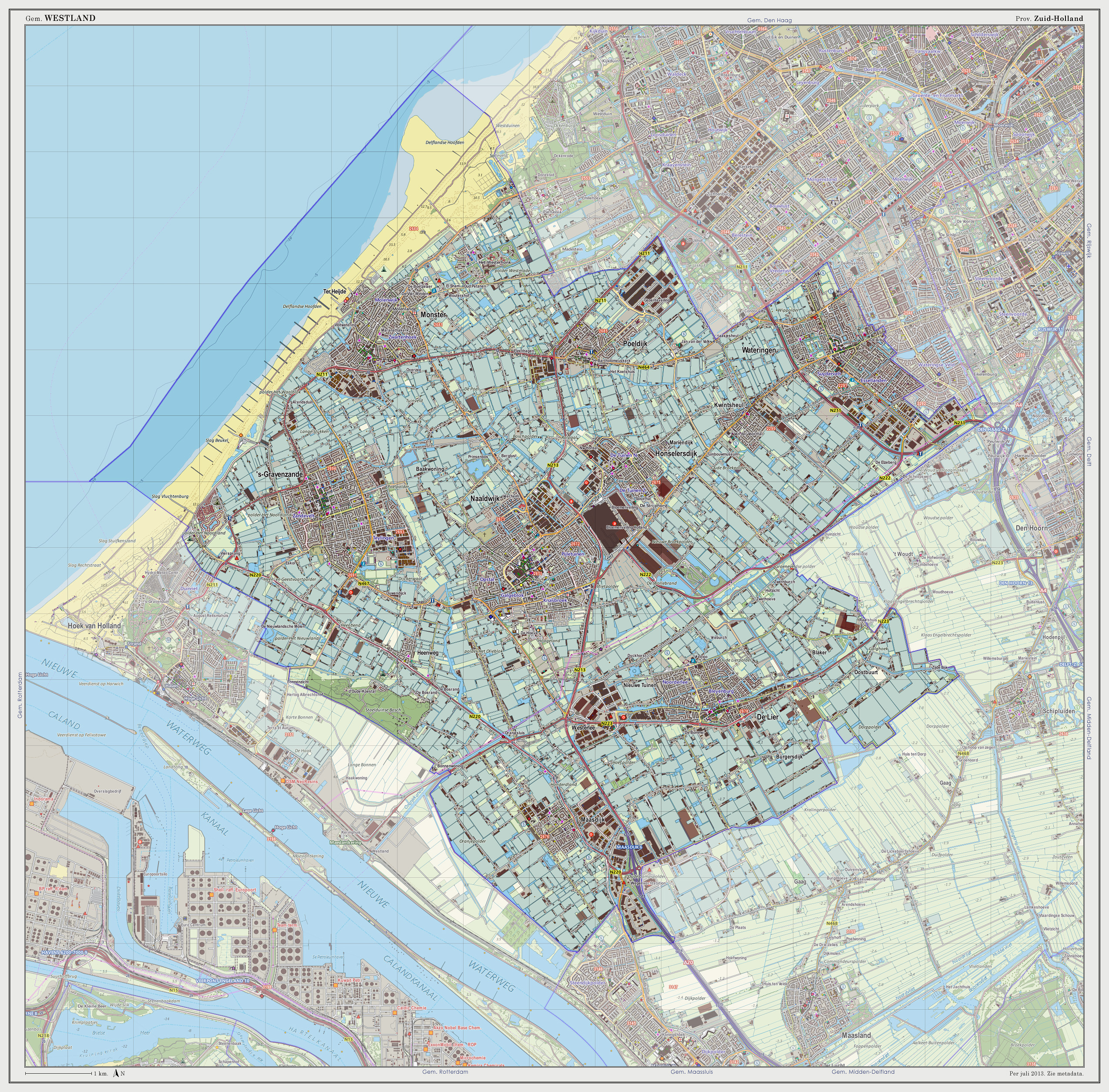
Topographic map of Westland, July 2013

Westland is part of the Haaglanden conurbation.

In a wider sense, Westland is also the name of the region south-west of the line The Hague - Delft - Rotterdam, approximately consisting of the municipalities Westland and Midden-Delfland, as well as Hook of Holland (municipality of Rotterdam).

Westland is most known for its horticulture in greenhouses, growing flowers and vegetables.

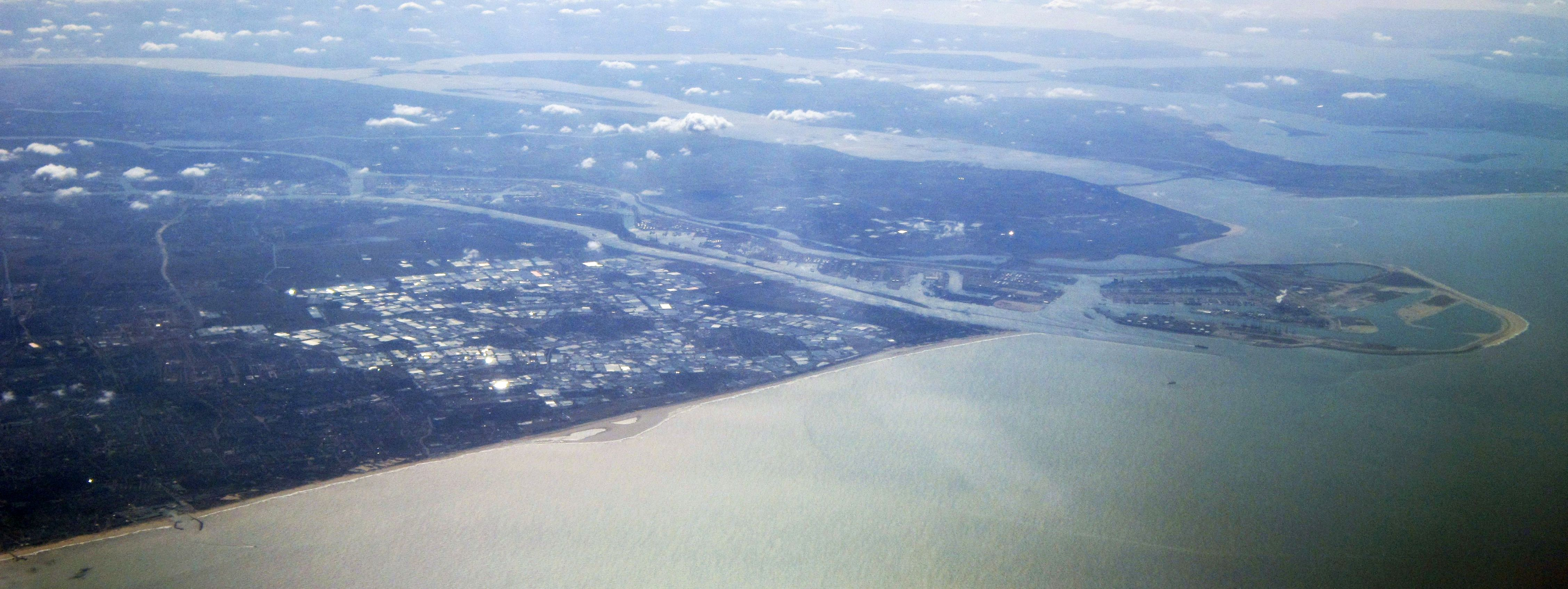
Aerial view of Westland (in the image center); behind it: Hook of Holland (the sharp-shaped promontory), Europoort (in between the two rivers), and Maasvlakte (protruding into the sea)

== Education ==
Westand has ten schools for primary education, located in Naaldwijk, De Lier, 's Gravenzande and Monster. Secondary schools in Westland collaborate in Samenwerkingsverband Voortgezet Onderwijs Westland (Collaborative relation for Secondary Education in Westland), which also includes schools from surrounding municipalities. Westland has one school for post-secondary education, MBO Westland, a school for middle-level applied education.

=== Secondary schools ===
==== Interdenominational Schools Westland (ISW) - Lucas Educational Foundation ====
- Hoogeland (Naaldwijk)
- Praktijkcollege Westland (Naaldwijk)
- Vakcollege Westland (Naaldwijk)
- Irenestraat (Poeldijk)
- Sweelincklaan ('s Gravenzande)
- Gasthuislaan ('s Gravenzande)

==== Lentiz Foundation ====
- Floracollege (Naaldwijk)
- Daltoncollege (Naaldwijk)
- Novilab (Naaldwijk)

==== Foundation Herman Boeren for Special Education ====
- Herman Broerencollege (Naaldwijk and Monster)

== Tourism ==
Westland receives approximately 1.7 million tourists per year, of which 41% go to the beaches of Ter Heide, Monster, and 's-Gravenzande; it provides about 2,000 jobs.

== Notable people ==
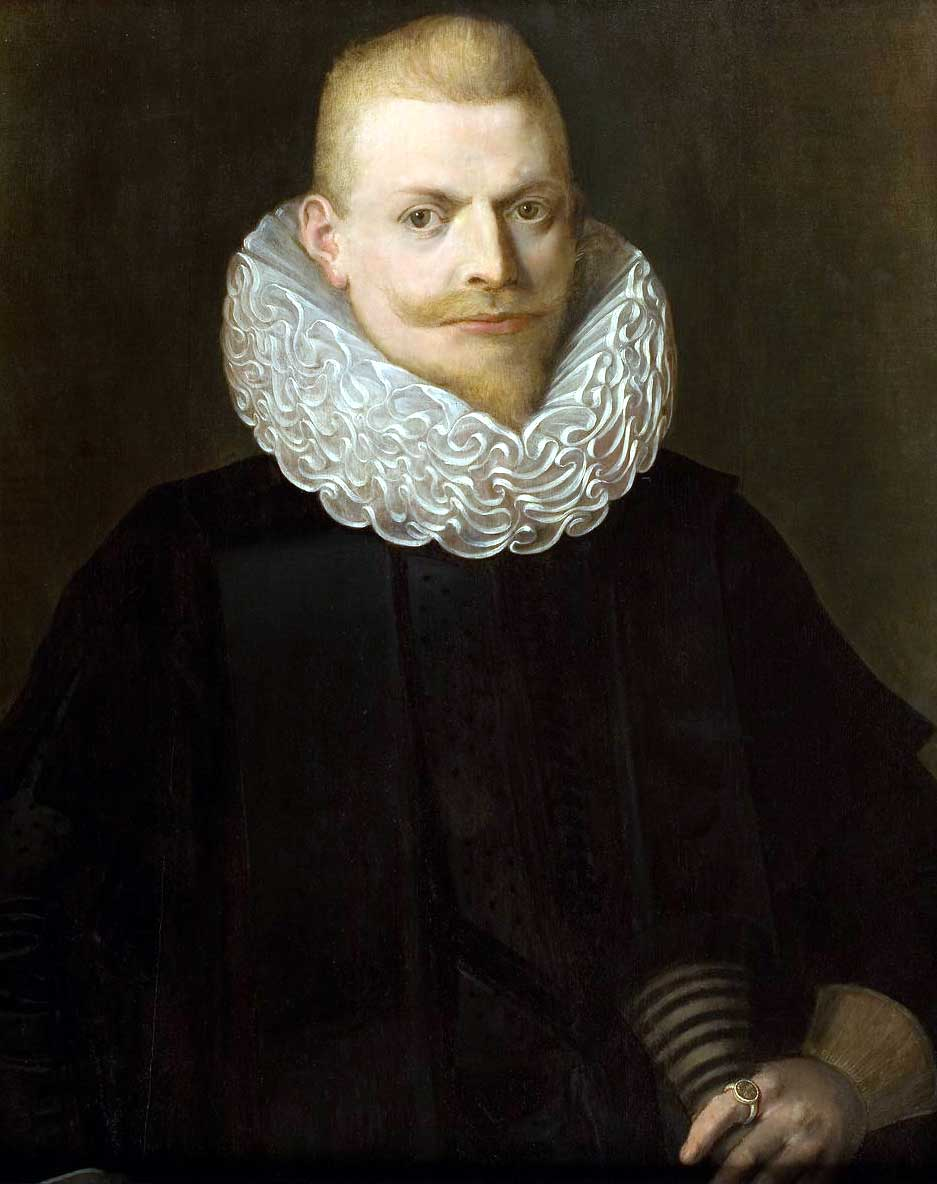
Franco Petri Burgersdijk, ca.1620

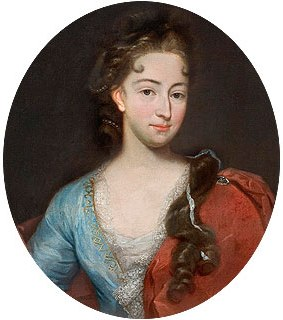
Maria van Aerden-Ponderus, ca.1700

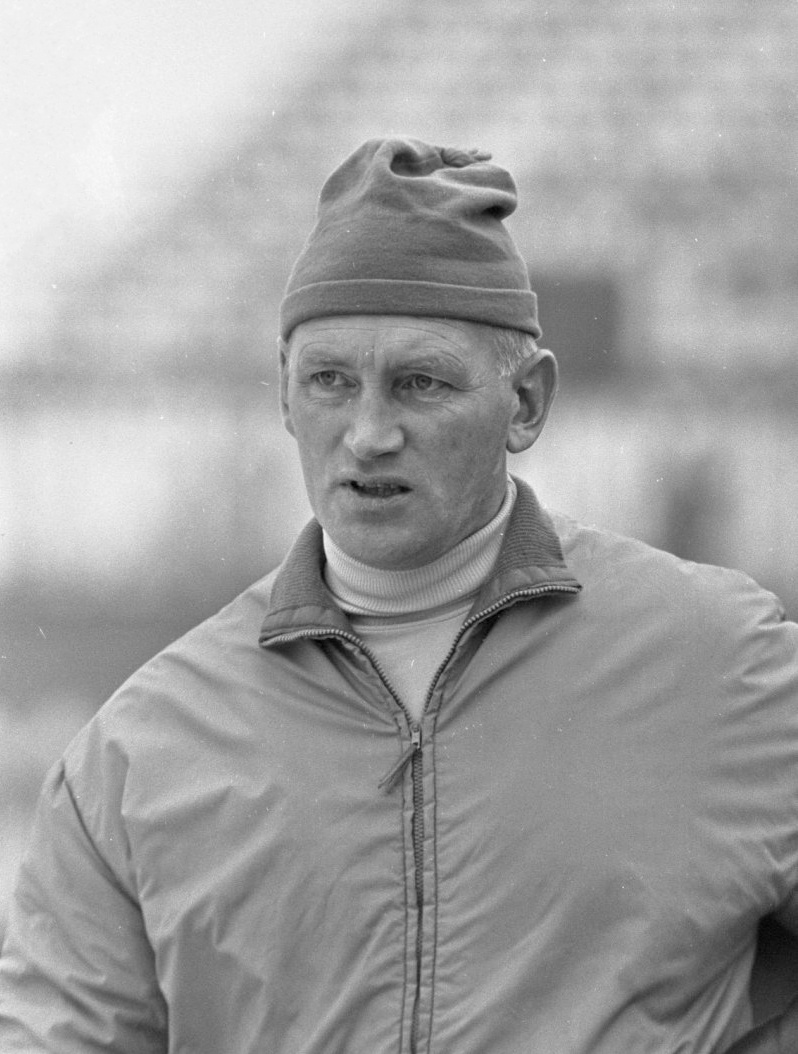
Kees Broekman, 1968

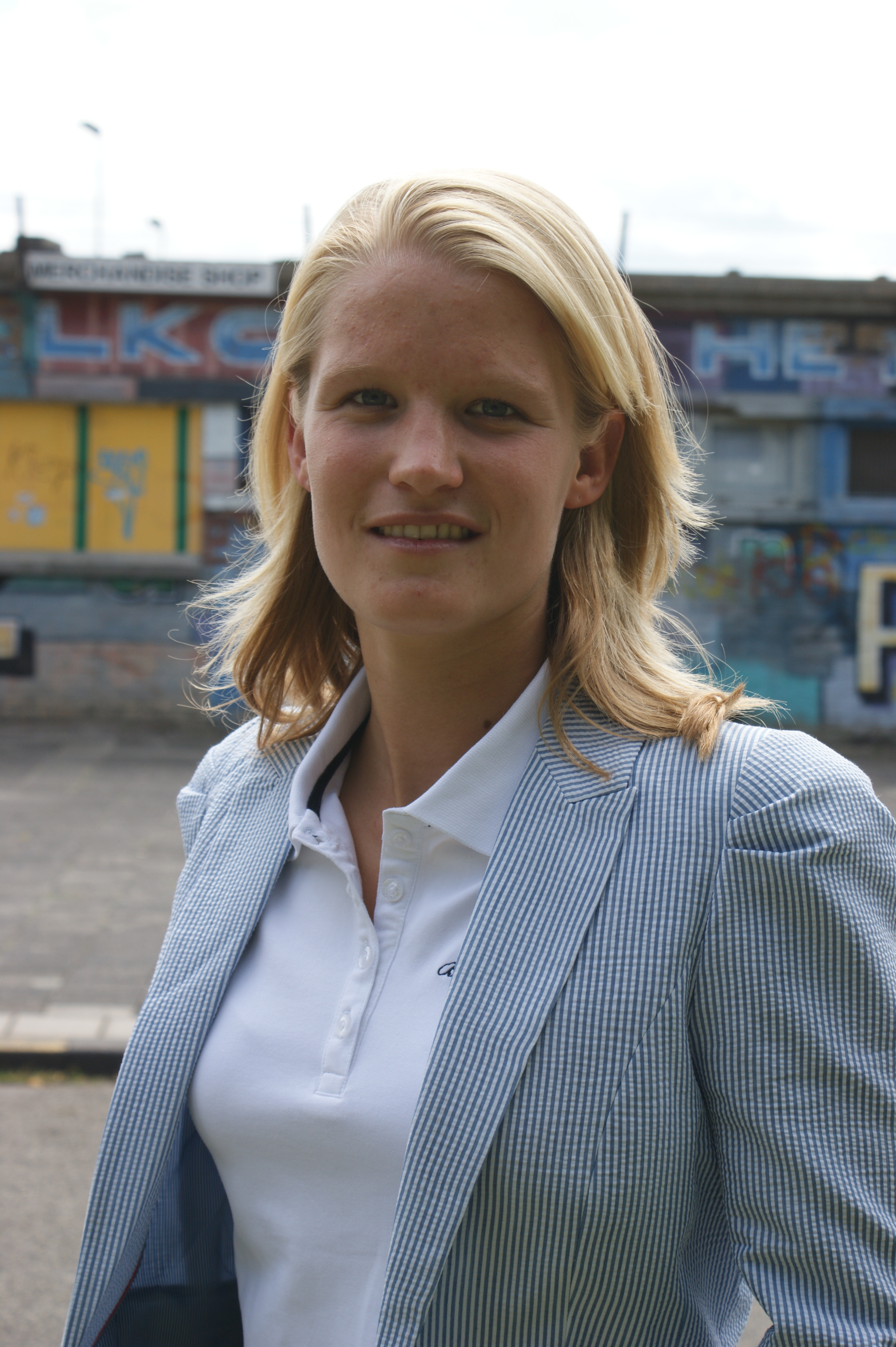
Mandy van den Berg, 2011

- Martinus Dorpius (1485 in Naaldwijk – 1525) a humanist, friend and correspondent of Erasmus
- Arnold Vinnius (1588 in Monster – 1657) a leading jurist
- Franco Burgersdijk (1590 in De Lier – 1635) a Dutch logician
- Maria Ponderus (1672 in Monster – 1764), an art collector and hofje founder
- Gerrit van Poelje (1884 in Maasdijk – 1976) a Dutch civil servant, lawyer and Public Administration scholar
- Peter Van de Wetering (1931 in Naaldwijk – 2014) an American horticulturist and nurseryman
- Huub Kortekaas (born 1935 in 's-Gravenzande) a Dutch sculptor
- Sander Jan Klerk a Dutch Actor.
- Rein Welschen (1941–2013) Dutch politician, acting Mayor of Westland in 2014
- Hans Strikwerda (born 1952 in Naaldwijk) a Dutch organizational theorist and academic
- Marc Lankhorst (born 1968 in Naaldwijk) a Dutch computer scientist, researcher and consultant, works on enterprise architecture and ArchiMate
- Anneliese Van Der Pol (born 1984 in Naaldwijk) a Dutch-American actress and singer

=== Sport ===
- Cornelis van Dalen (1885 in Monster – 1953) a Dutch sports shooter, competed at the 1920 Summer Olympics
- Hans Houtzager (1910 in Honselersdijk – 1993) a Dutch hammer thrower, competed at the 1936 and 1948 Summer Olympics
- Wim van der Voort (1923 in 's-Gravenzande – 2016) a Dutch speed skater, silver medalist at the 1952 Summer Olympics
- Kees Broekman (1927 in De Lier – 1992) a Dutch former speed skater, silver medalist at the 1952 Summer Olympics
- Leo van Vliet (born 1955 in Honselersdijk) a former professional racing cyclist
- Jutta Leerdam a Dutch Speedskater
- Gerrit Solleveld (born 1961 in De Lier) a former Dutch professional road bicycle racer
- Menno Boelsma (born 1961 in Monster) a retired speed skater, competed at the 1988 Winter Olympics
- Patrick van der Meer (born 1971 in Wateringen) a Dutch dressage rider, competed at the 2012 Summer Olympics
- Marinus Dijkhuizen (born 1972 in 's-Gravenzande) a Dutch football manager, coach and former player with 365 club caps
- Oscar Moens (born 1973 in 's-Gravenzande) a former Dutch footballer with 401 club caps
- Guus Vogels (born 1975 in Naaldwijk) a Dutch field hockey goalkeeper, gold medallist at the 1966 and 2000 Summer Olympics
- Stefan Aartsen (born 1975 in 's-Gravenzande) a former butterfly swimmer, competed at the 1996 and 2000 Summer Olympics
- Ricardo van der Ende (born 1979 in Poeldijk) a Dutch racing driver
- Johan Voskamp (born 1984 in De Lier) a Dutch footballer with over 280 club caps
- Mandy Mulder (born 1987 in Poeldijk) a sailor, competed at the 2008 Summer Olympics
- Thiemo de Bakker (born 1988 in 's-Gravenzande) a Dutch tennis player
- Mandy van den Berg (born 1990 in Naaldwijk) a Dutch football defender
- Arantxa Rus (born 1990) a Dutch tennis player, lives in Monster
- Kiki Bertens (born 1991 in Wateringen) a Dutch tennis player
- Lara van Ruijven (born 1992 in Naaldwijk - 2020) a Dutch short track speed skater
