= Huub en Adelheid Kortekaas =

Duo of artists

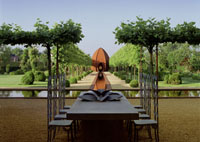
De Tempelhof

Huub Kortekaas and Adelheid Kortekaas present themselves as artists duo since 1999, although they actually have worked together since their marriage in 1969.

== Huub Kortekaas ==
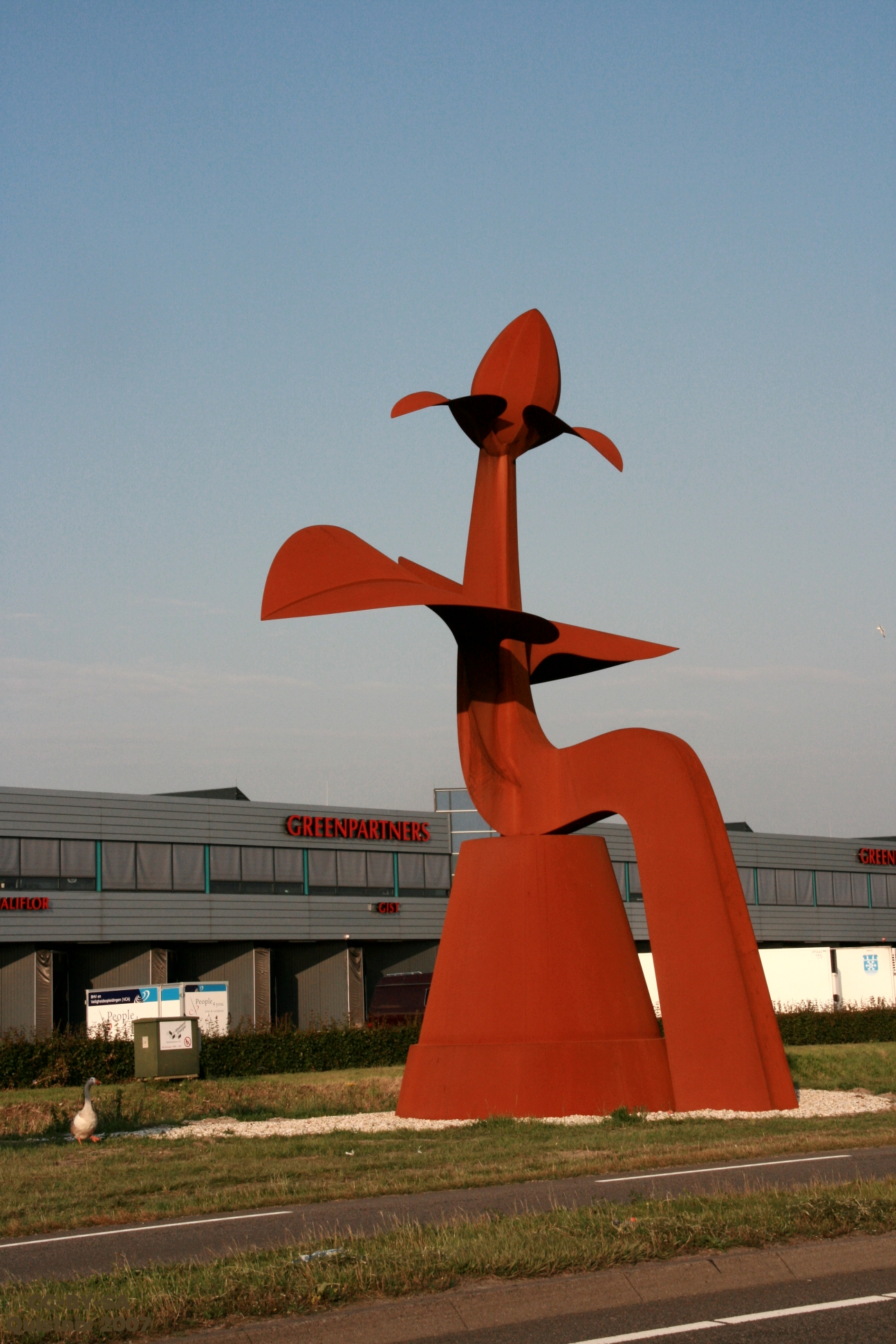
"Sitting Angel on reversed flower pot"

Huub Kortekaas, a Dutch sculptor, was born 17 July 1935 in 's-Gravenzande, the son of a gardener. He initially chose the profession of teacher, but made at the age of 25 his first sculpture, a large statue of Erasmus for the university at Nijmegen. At 30 he chose definitely to be an artist. As an artist he is self-taught. Between 1960 and 1964 he worked in the Old Tower in Winssen and in 1965 he moved to Castle Doddendaal in Ewijk.

== Adelheid Kortekaas ==
Adelheid van Swelm, a Dutch sculptor, born in 1947 in Nijmegen, and studied garden architecture with a passion for architecture. As an artist she is self-taught.

== Life and work ==
They married in 1969 but met in 1965. From then on they both worked creatively closely together and from since 1999 as a duo. In 1965 their Heart was created and in 1970 their first joint artproject The Circle of Angels arose, a colorful environment of large polyester statues. Since 1974 their work has the theme of 'The Plant' as a metaphor for man.

Starting in 1995 they built The Tempelhof, a culmination of their life and work and since 2018 honoured as Dutch Cultural Heritage. The Anima Mundi initiated project in 1984 and is in development for further realization. An already realised large project of them is The Unifying Spiritual Field of the World (1991). Since 2002 they have worked together on The Spiritual Garden as an imagination of the five world religions + the garden of universal spirituality, by which they find inspiration in the symbolism of numbers.

They are known for large projects but also for many monumental statues in the Netherlands and in other countries, that often are realised in corten steel. Their works are found mainly in the Netherlands but also in Belgium, Switzerland, Germany, France, England, Dubai and Palestine. The philosophy behind their work is in 2012 expressed in the Manifest Utopia: Life as Work of Art. In 2015 The World my Garden. In 2018 Manifest Quantum Art 2018.
