= Maasdijk, Westland =

Maasdijk
- Village
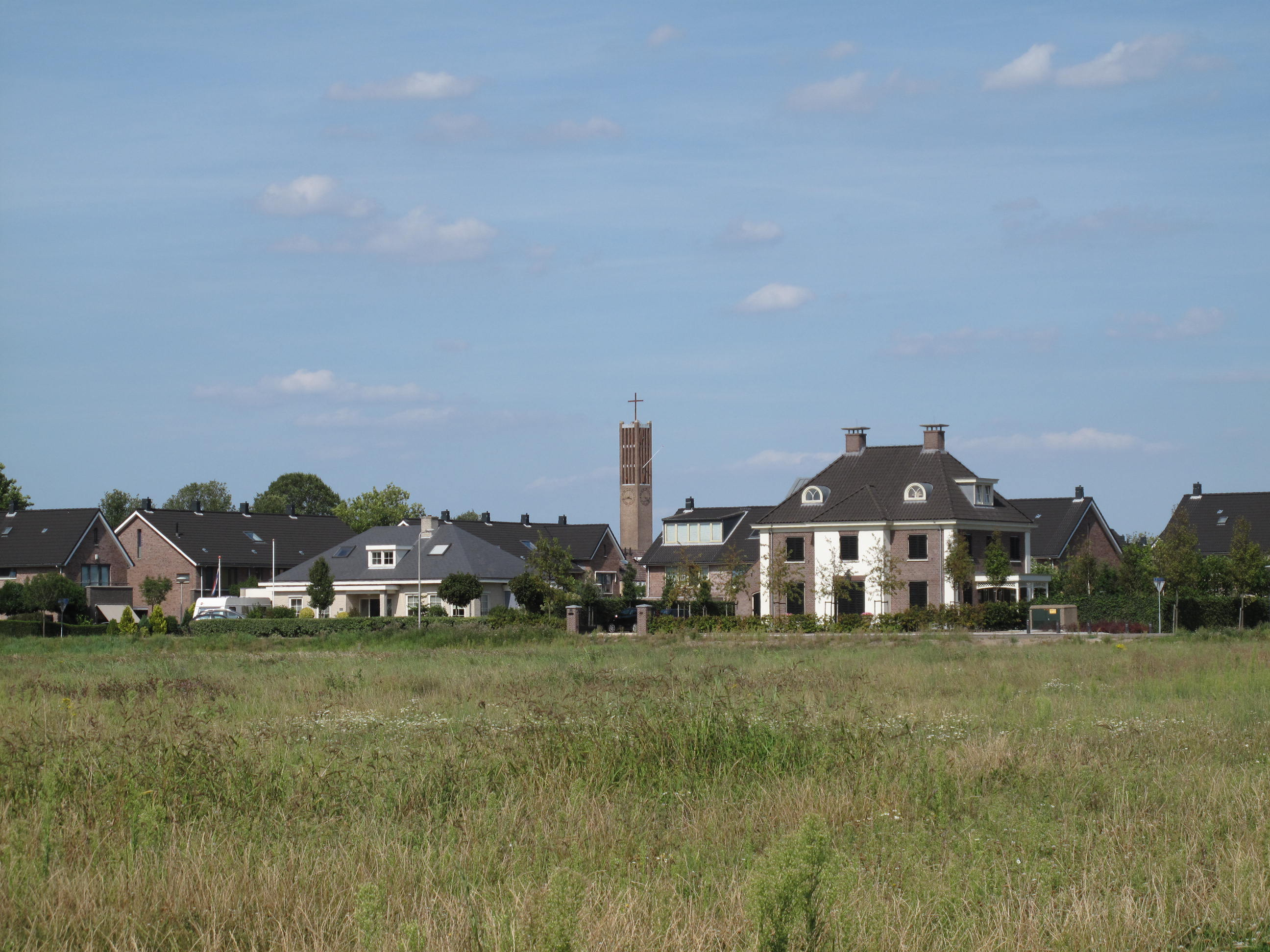
- Maasdijk, view to the village

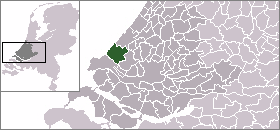

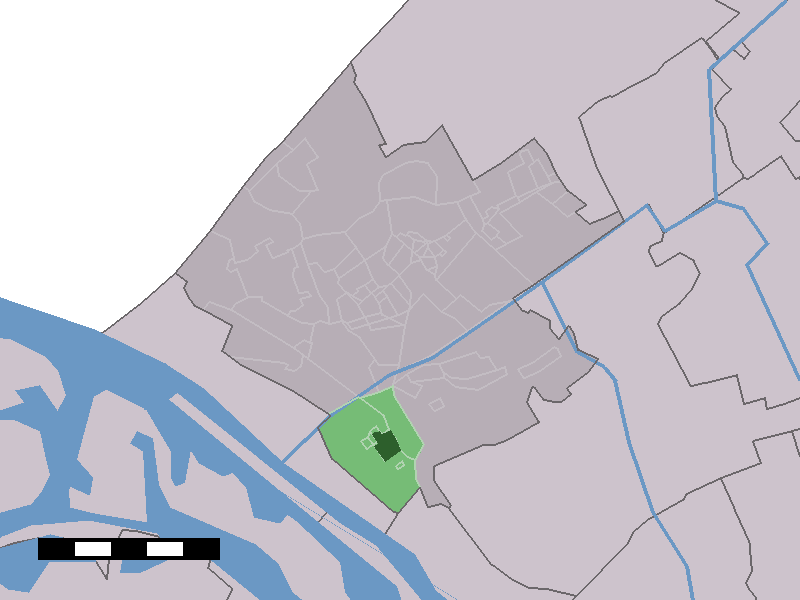
- The village centre (dark green) and the statistical district (light green) of Maasdijk in the municipality of Westland.
- Coordinates: 51°58′N 4°13′E
- Country: Netherlands
- Province: South Holland
- Municipality: Westland
- Time zone: UTC+1 (CET)
  - Summer (DST): UTC+2 (CEST)

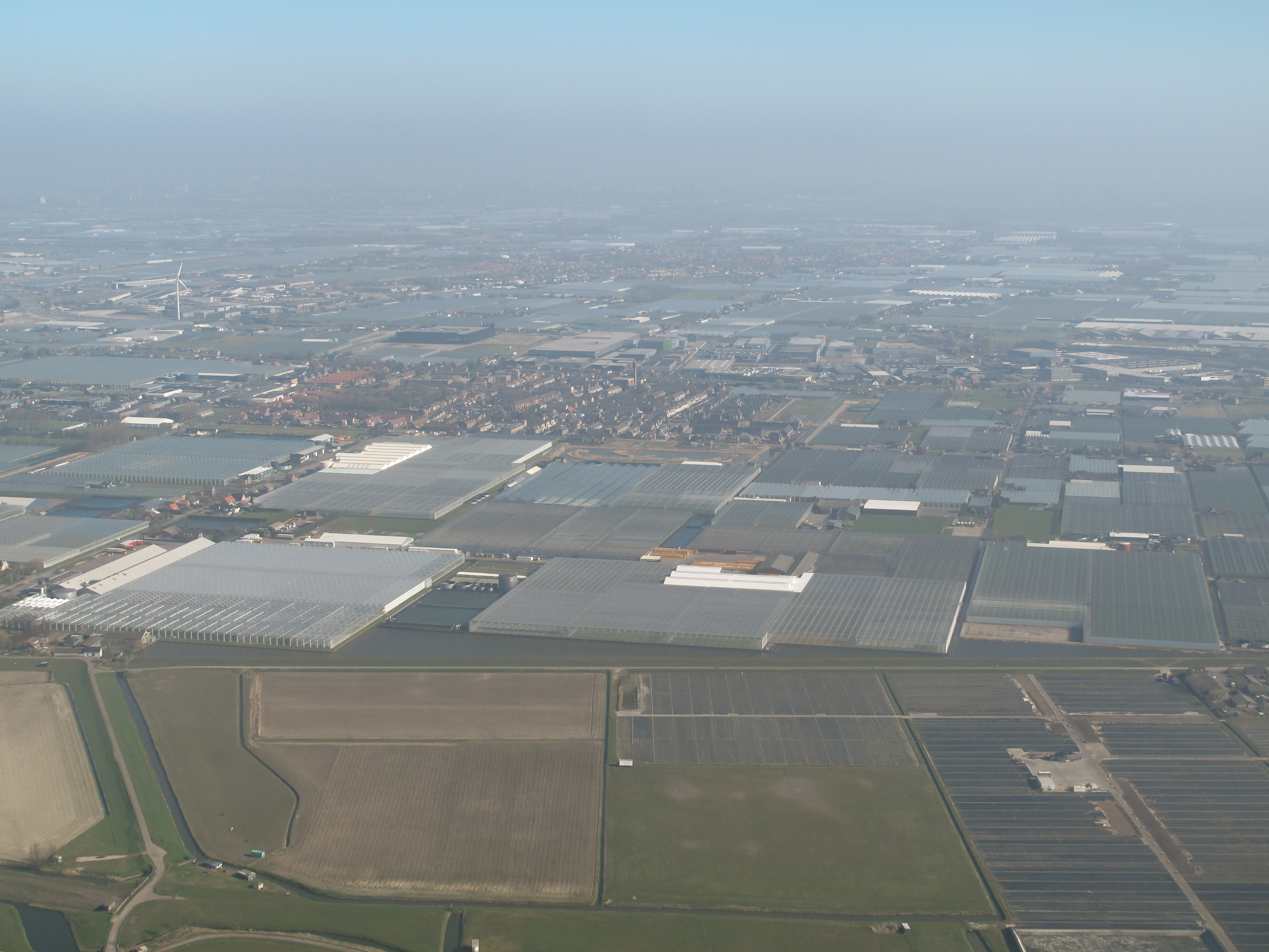
View to Maasdijk from the sky

Maasdijk is a village in the Dutch province of South Holland. It is a part of the municipality of Westland, and lies about 5 km northwest of Maassluis.

In 2008, the village of Maasdijk has 7000 inhabitants. The built-up area of the village is 1.5 km^{2}, and contains 4000 of the 7000 residences. The statistical area "Maasdijk", which also can include the peripheral parts of the village, as well as the surrounding countryside, has a population of around 4060.
