= Wateringen =

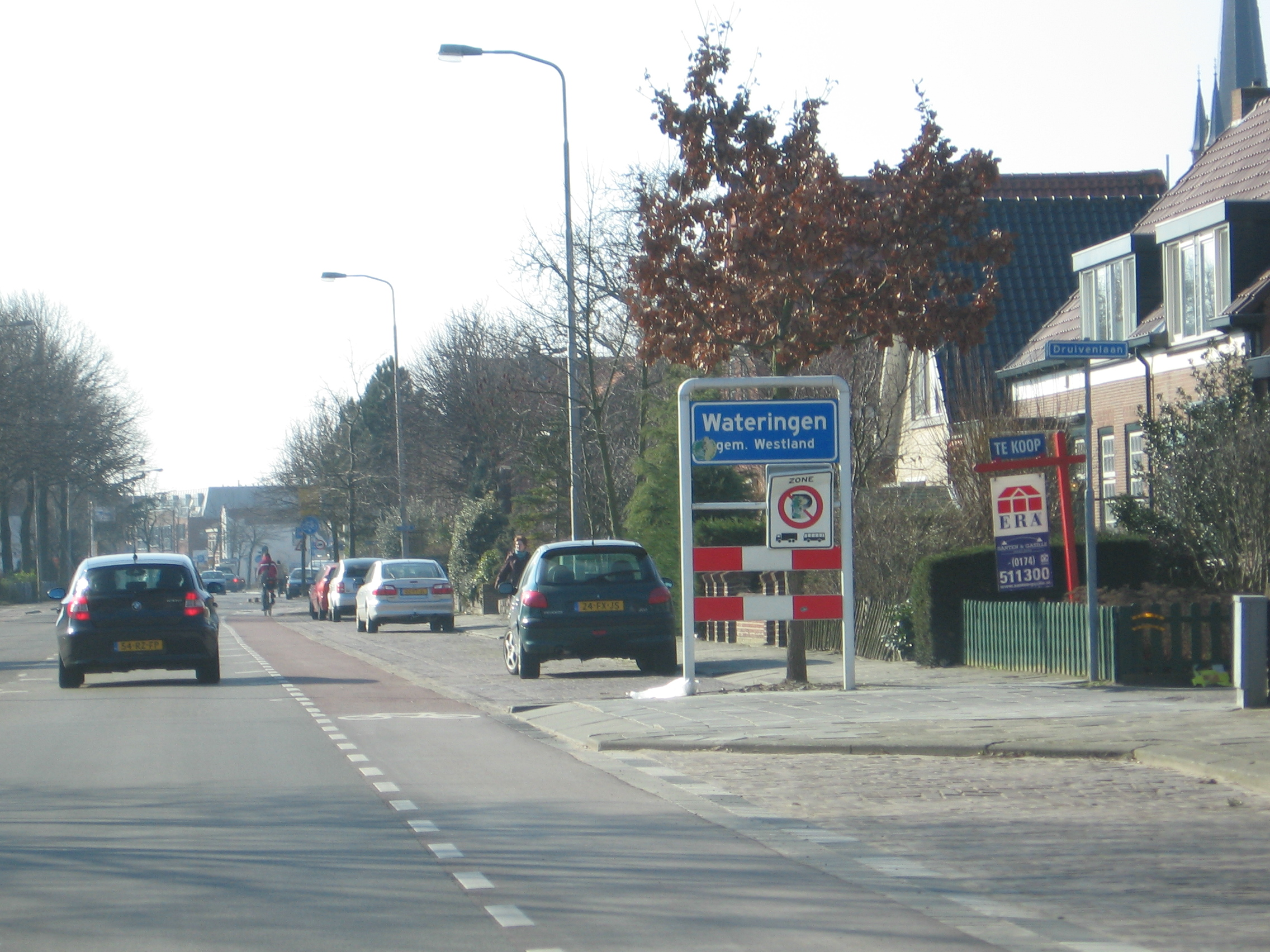

- Flag Coat of arms

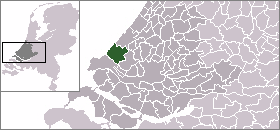

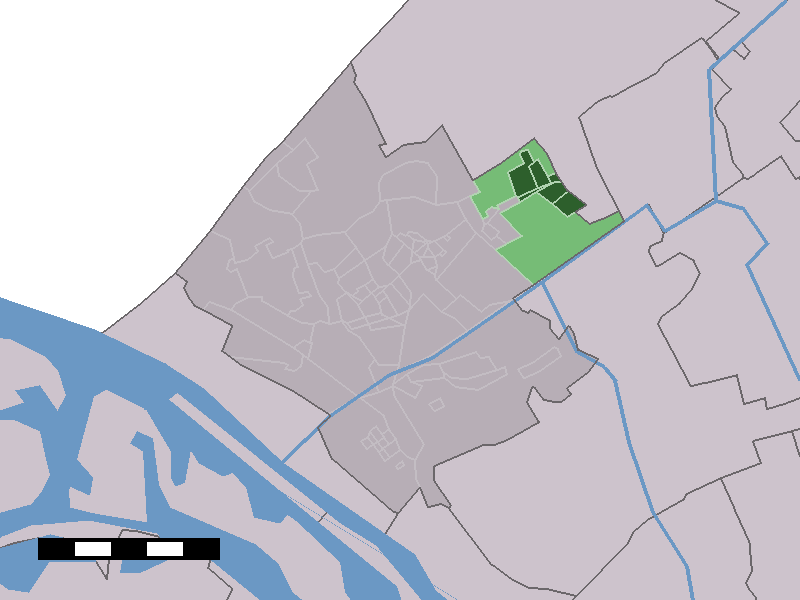
- The village (dark green) and the statistical district (light green) of Wateringen in the municipality of Westland.
- Coordinates: 52°1′N 4°16′E
- Country: Netherlands
- Province: South Holland
- Municipality: Westland

Area
  - Total: 8.9 km^{2} (3.4 sq mi)

Wateringen is a village in the Dutch province of South Holland. It is a part of the municipality of Westland, and lies about 5 km southwest of The Hague city centre.

Until 2004 it was a separate municipality and covered an area of 8.93 km^{2}.

The former municipality of Wateringen also included the village Kwintsheul.

The village of Wateringen has a population of around 10,860. The statistical area Wateringen, which also can include the surrounding countryside, has a population of around 13,880.

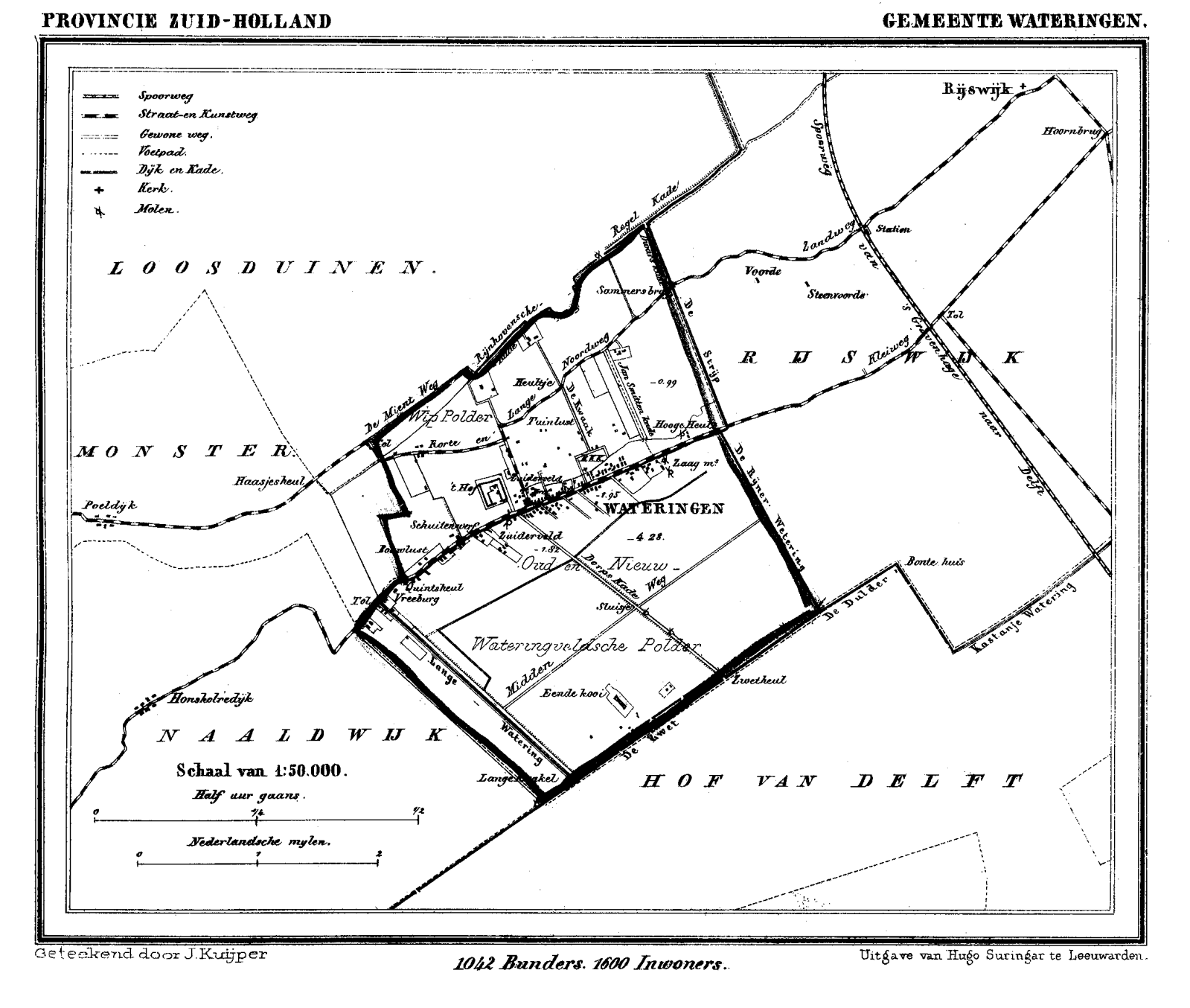
Wateringen in 1865.

== Gallery ==
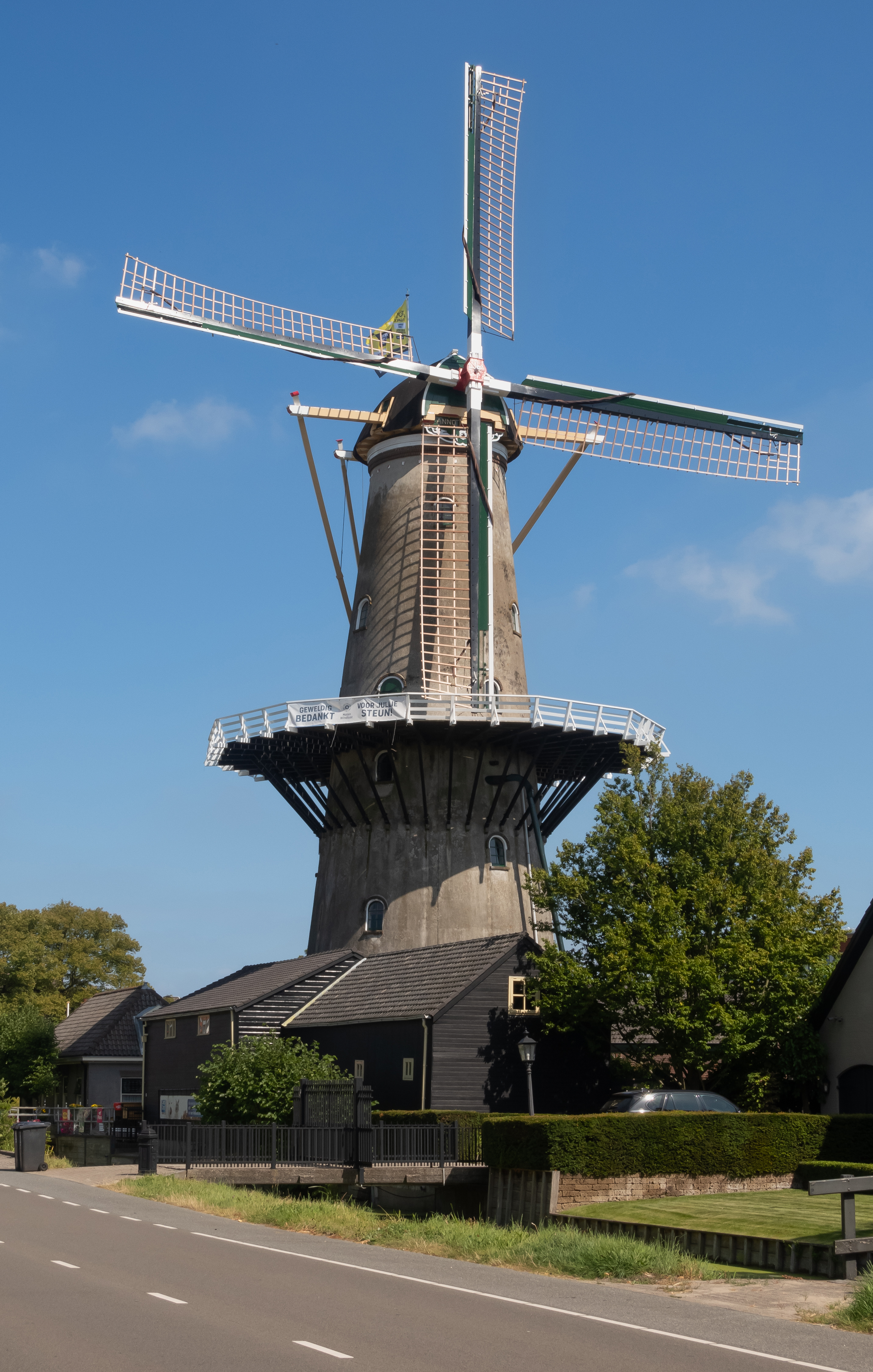
windmill: molen de Windlust

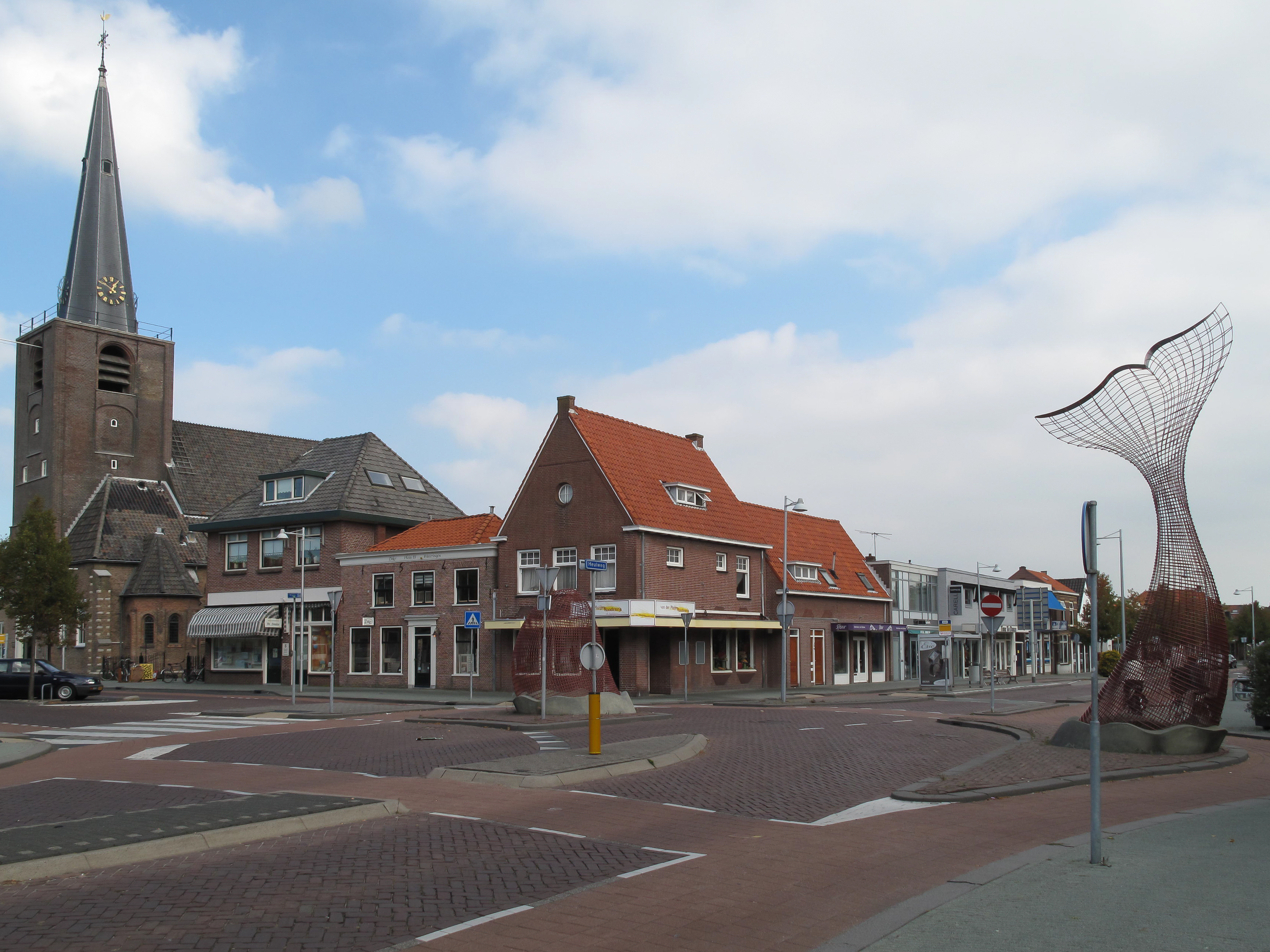
church in the street

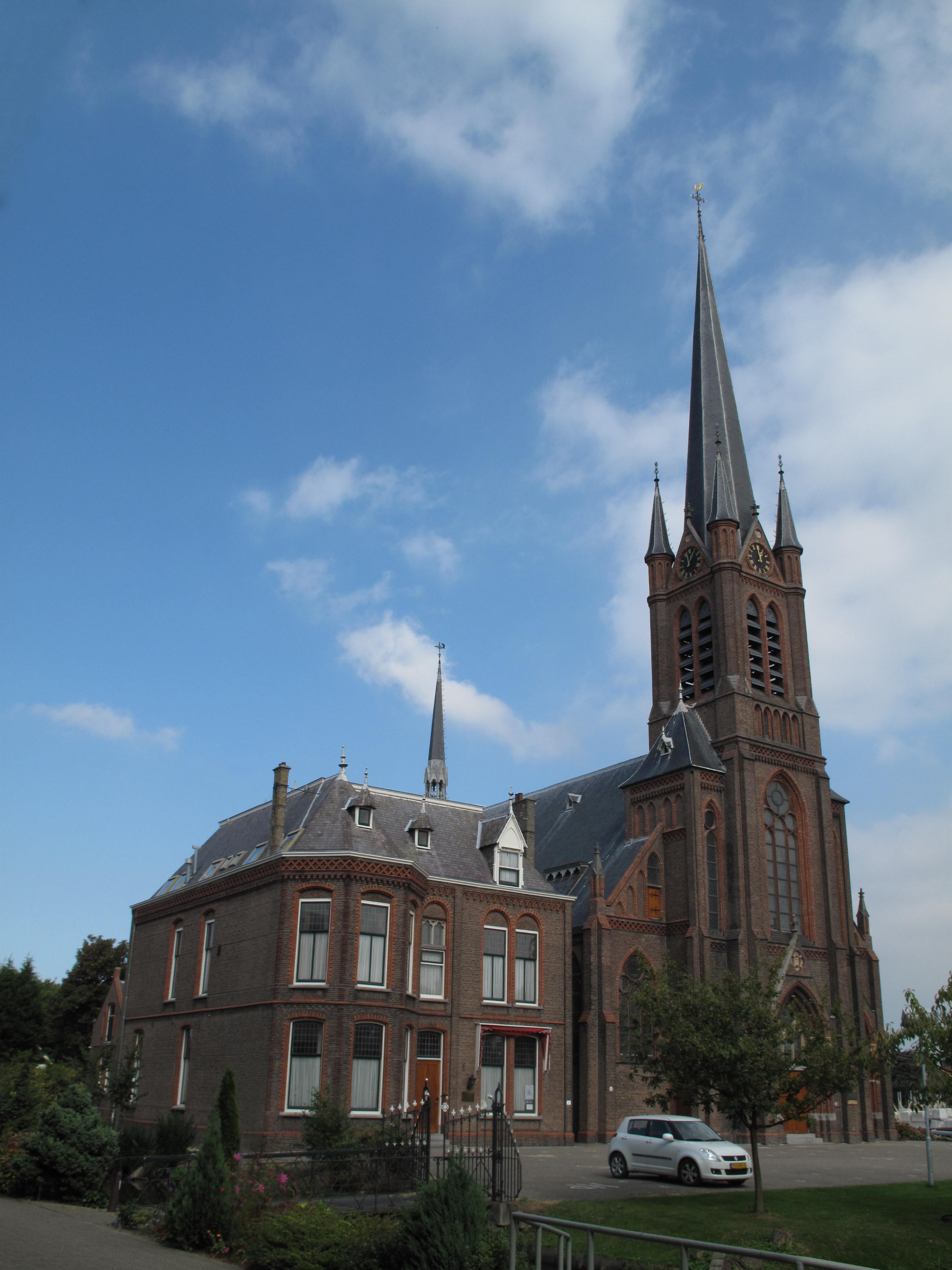
church: Sint Jan de Doperkerk
