= Heenweg =

- Village
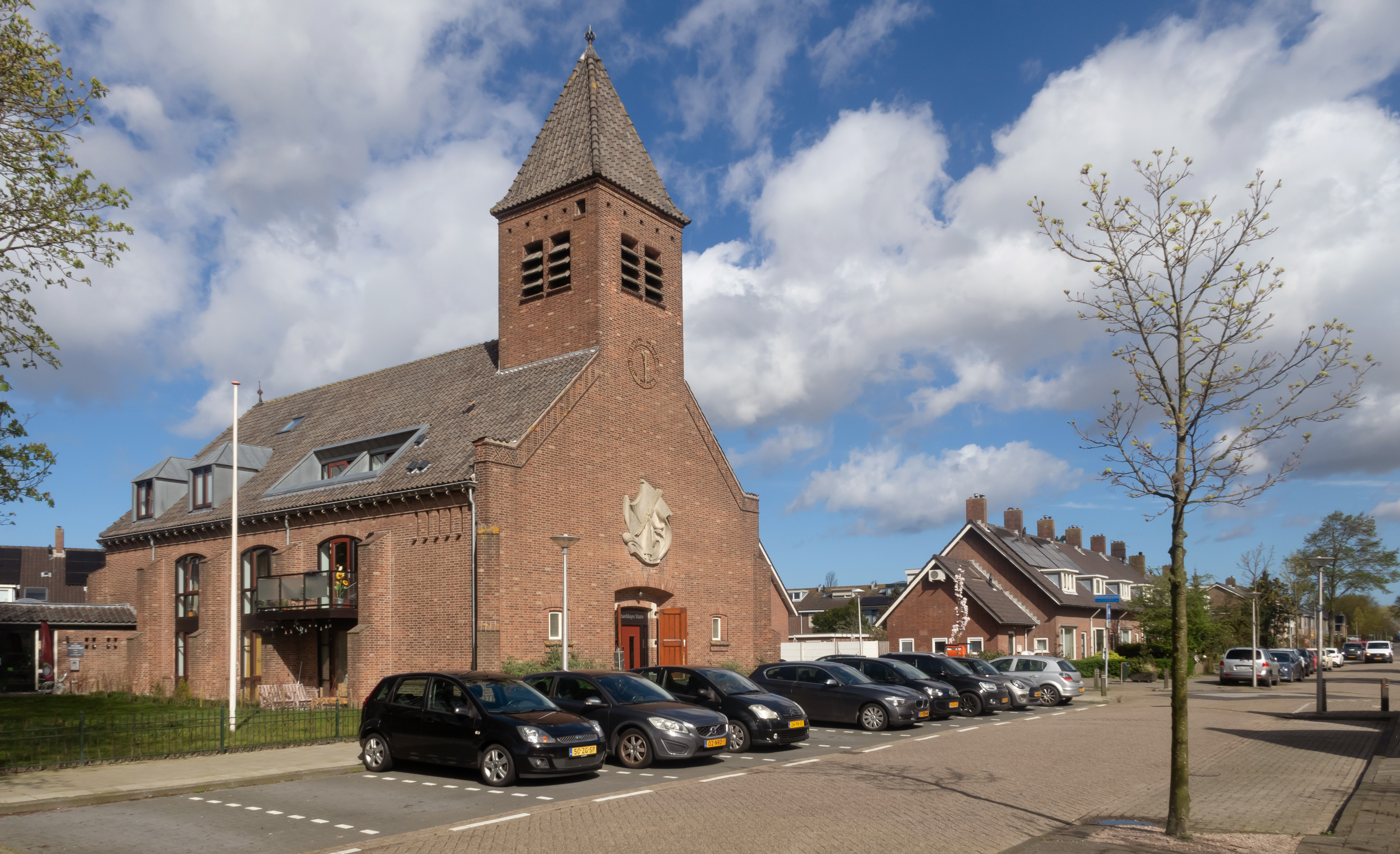
- Heenweg, former church (Nieuwe Kerk)

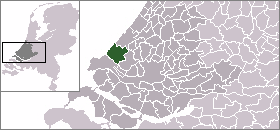

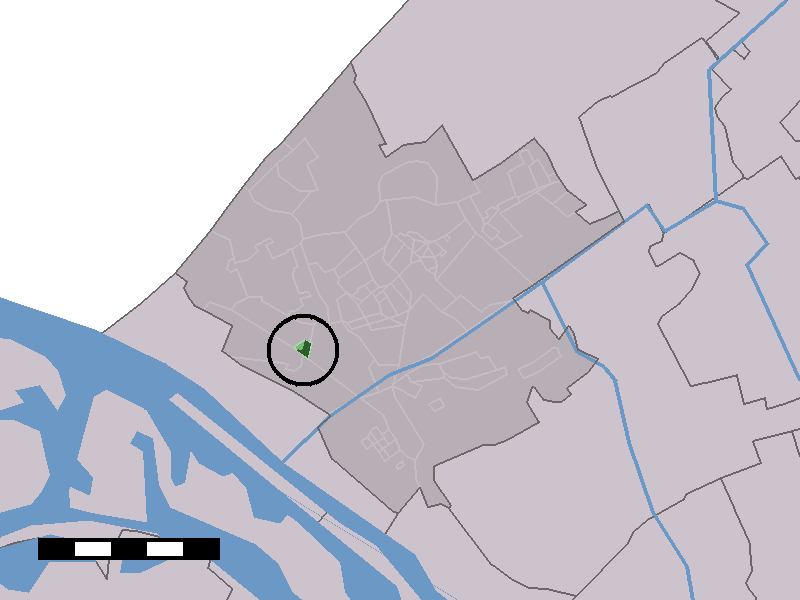
- The centre (dark green) and the statistical district (light green) of Heenweg in the municipality of Westland.
- Coordinates: 51°59′N 4°11′E
- Country: Netherlands
- Province: South Holland
- Municipality: Westland

Population
  - Total: 641
- Time zone: UTC+1 (CET)
  - Summer (DST): UTC+2 (CEST)

Heenweg is a village in the province of South Holland, Western Netherlands. It is a part of the municipality of Westland, and lies approximately 7 km (4.3 mi) northwest of Maassluis.

In 2001, the village of Heenweg had 601 inhabitants, with 228 residences covering 0.076 km². The statistical area Heenweg, which encompasses the surrounding countryside, has a population of approximately 690.
