= Ter Heijde =

- Village
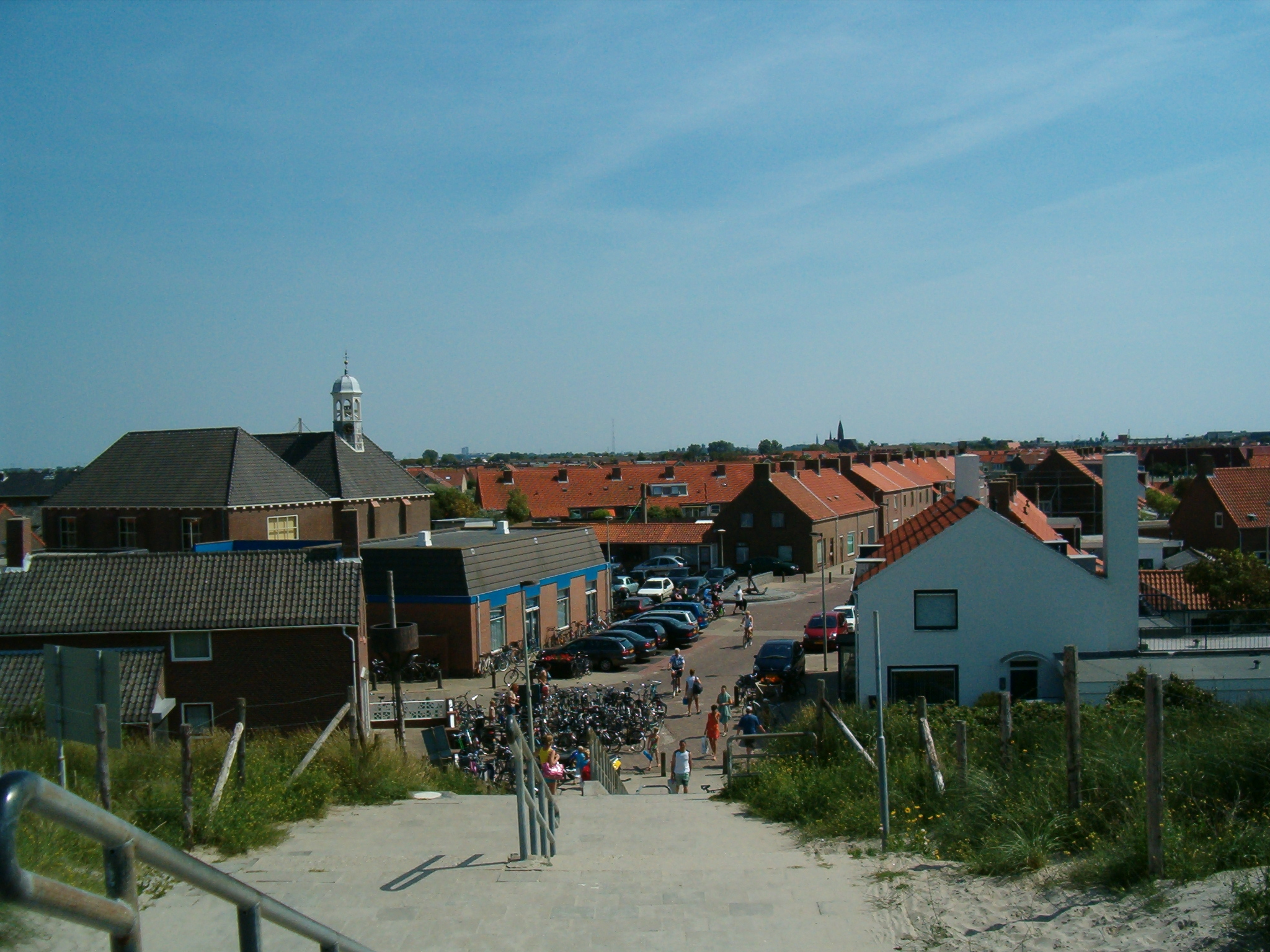
- View of Ter Heijde from the coastal dunes

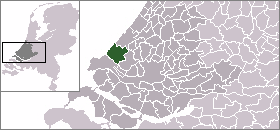

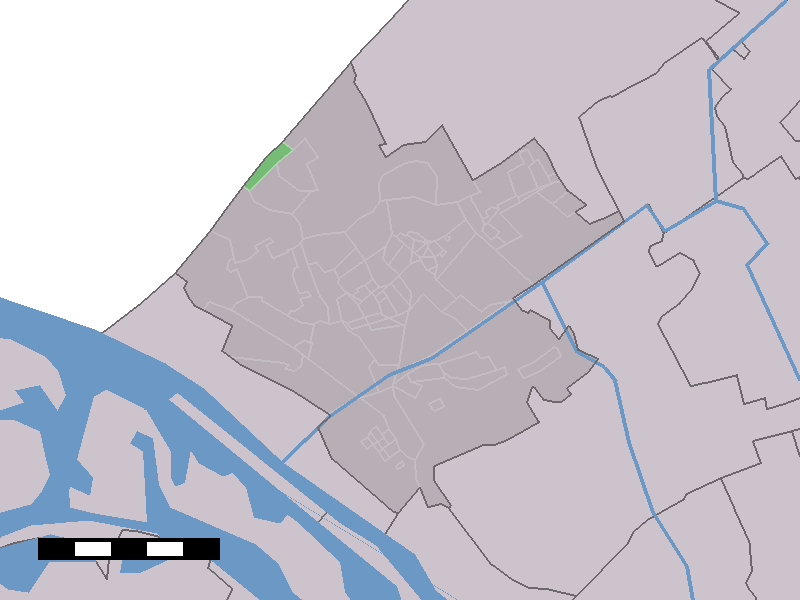
- Ter Heijde in the municipality of Westland.
- Coordinates: 52°1′47″N 4°10′3″E
- Country: Netherlands
- Province: South Holland
- Municipality: Westland

Area
  - Total: 0.46 km^{2} (0.18 sq mi)

Population (2008)
  - Total: 610
  - Density: 1,300/km^{2} (3,400/sq mi)
- Time zone: UTC+1 (CET)
  - Summer (DST): UTC+2 (CEST)

Ter Heijde is a village in the Dutch province of South Holland. It is a part of the municipality of Westland, and lies about 6 km southwest of The Hague.

The area "Ter Heijde", which also includes the surrounding countryside, has a population of around 690, mostly elderly people. Ter Heijde is a popular beach-resort. It has a lifeboat station of the KNRM, the Dutch equivalent of the Royal National Lifeboat Institution.

Ter Heijde is known for the Battle of Ter Heijde (also known as The Battle of Scheveningen). This was the final battle, in 1653, of the First Anglo-Dutch War, which saw the death of Admiral Maarten Tromp. In remembrance of the battle there is a monument in the village. In 2003, 350 years after the battle, the Tromp-festival was held.

In 1677 Prince William of Orange and his recently married wife Mary (the future King William III and Queen Mary II of England) were forced to land at Ter Heijde, Rotterdam being ice bound.

== Economy ==
The economy of Ter Heijde is mostly shaped around the beach tourism relying on small-scale tourism.

== Gallery ==
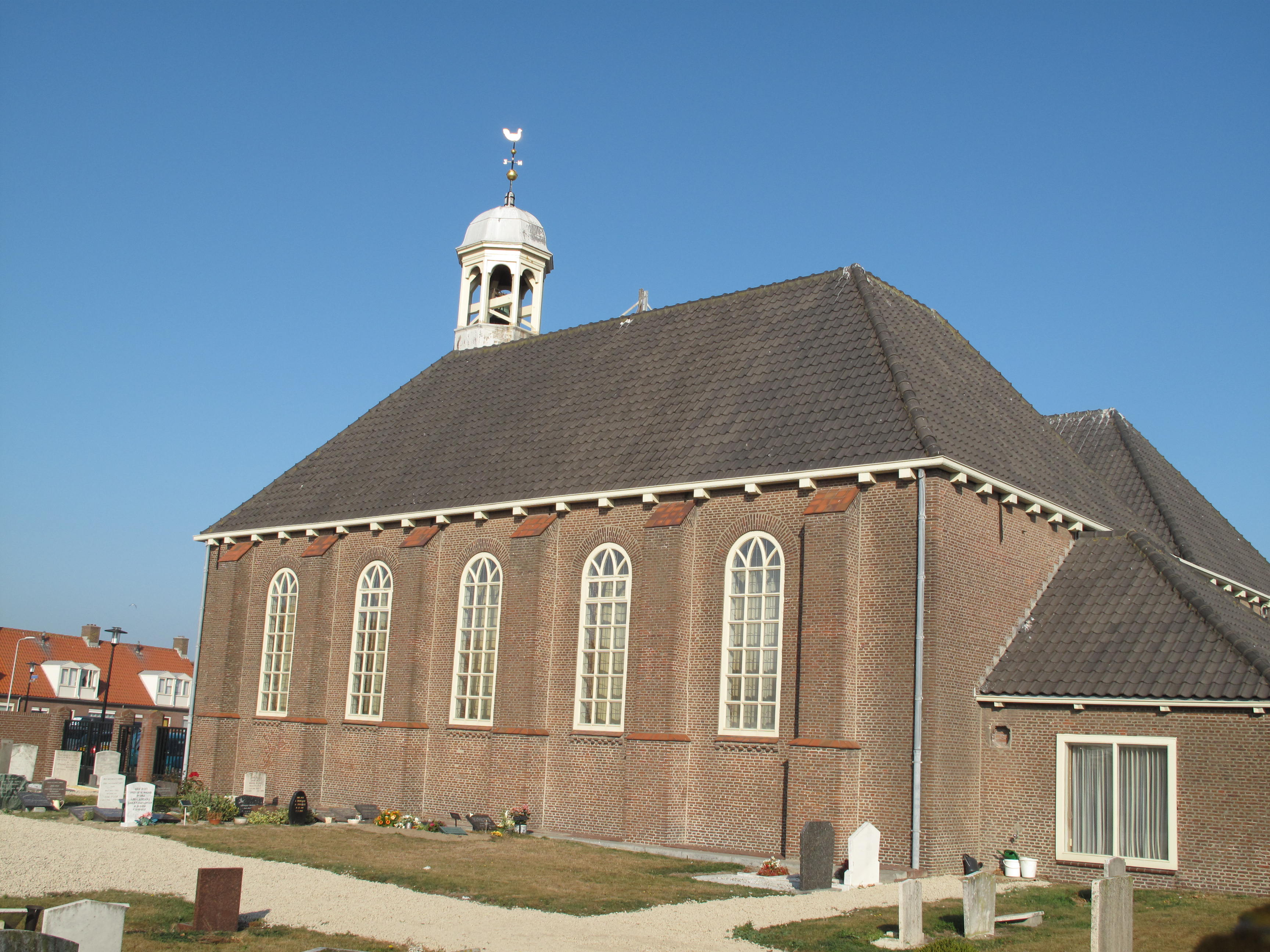
Church

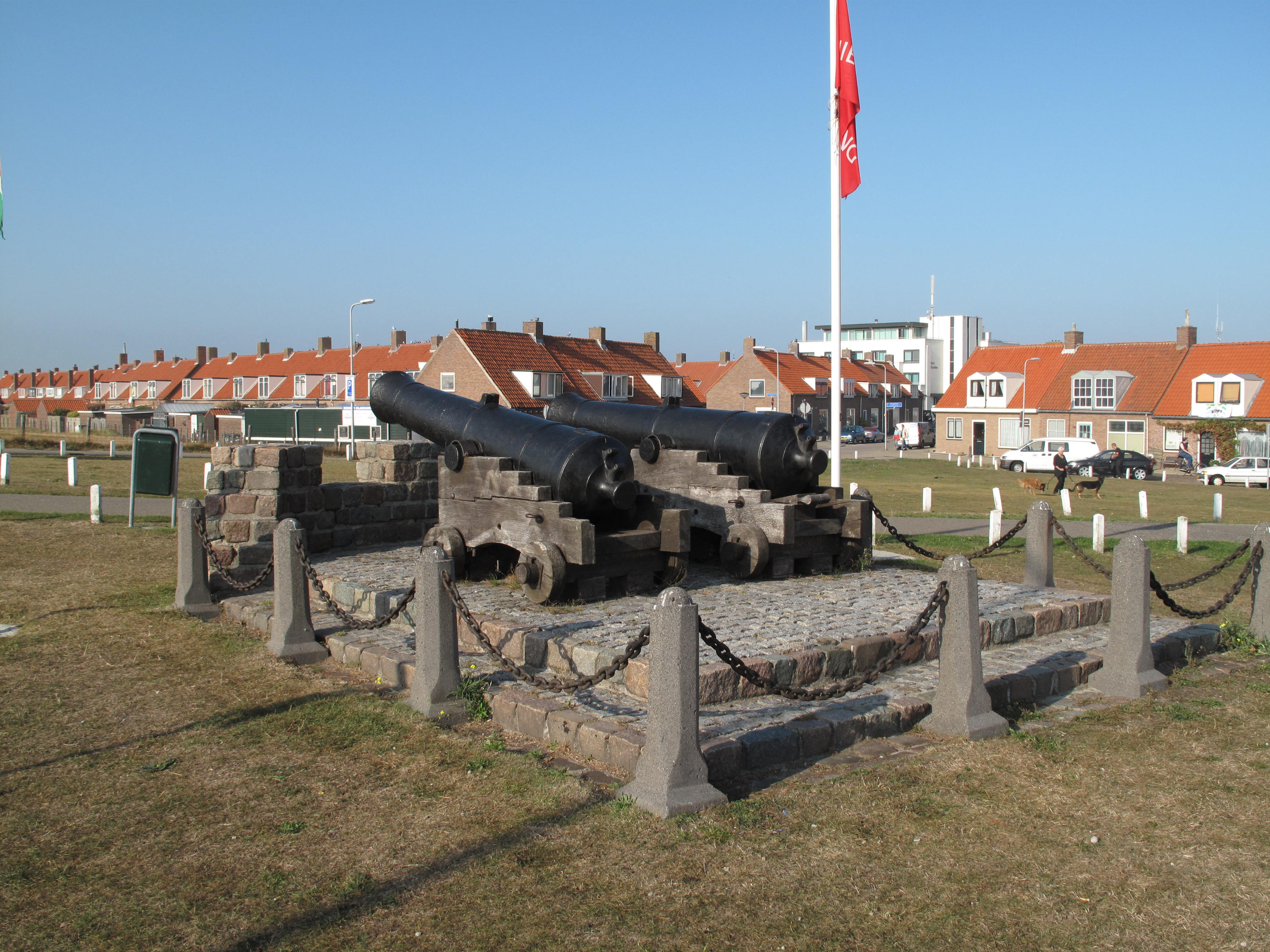
War monument: 1st Anglo-Dutch War
