= Poeldijk =

== Basics ==
Poeldijk
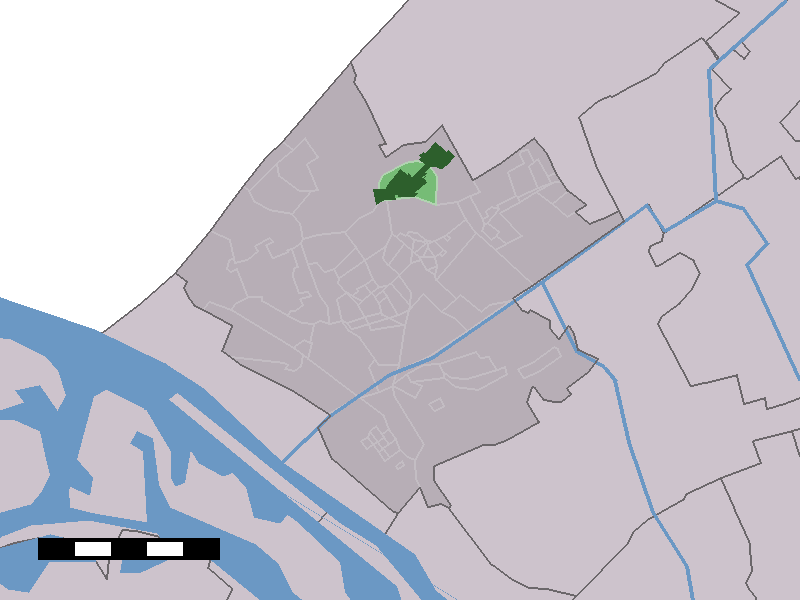
- The town centre (dark green) and the statistical district (light green) of Poeldijk in the municipality of Westland.

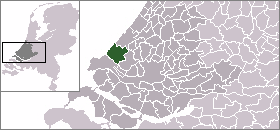
- Coordinates: 52°1′30″N 4°13′19″E
- Country: Netherlands
- Province: South Holland
- Municipality: Westland

Area
  - Total: 1.52 km^{2} (0.59 sq mi)

Population (2008)
  - Total: 7,080

Poeldijk (52°1′N 4°13′E) is a village in the Dutch province of South Holland. It is a part of the municipality of Westland, and lies about 8 km southwest of The Hague.

In 2001, the village of Poeldijk had 5335 inhabitants. The built-up area of the village was 1.1 km^{2}, and contained 3400 residences. The statistical area "Poeldijk", which also can include the peripheral parts of the village, as well as the surrounding countryside, has a population of around 7080.

== Economy ==
The economy of Poeldijk is driven by greenhouse horticulture, with large-scale vegetable and flower production suplying both national and international markets.

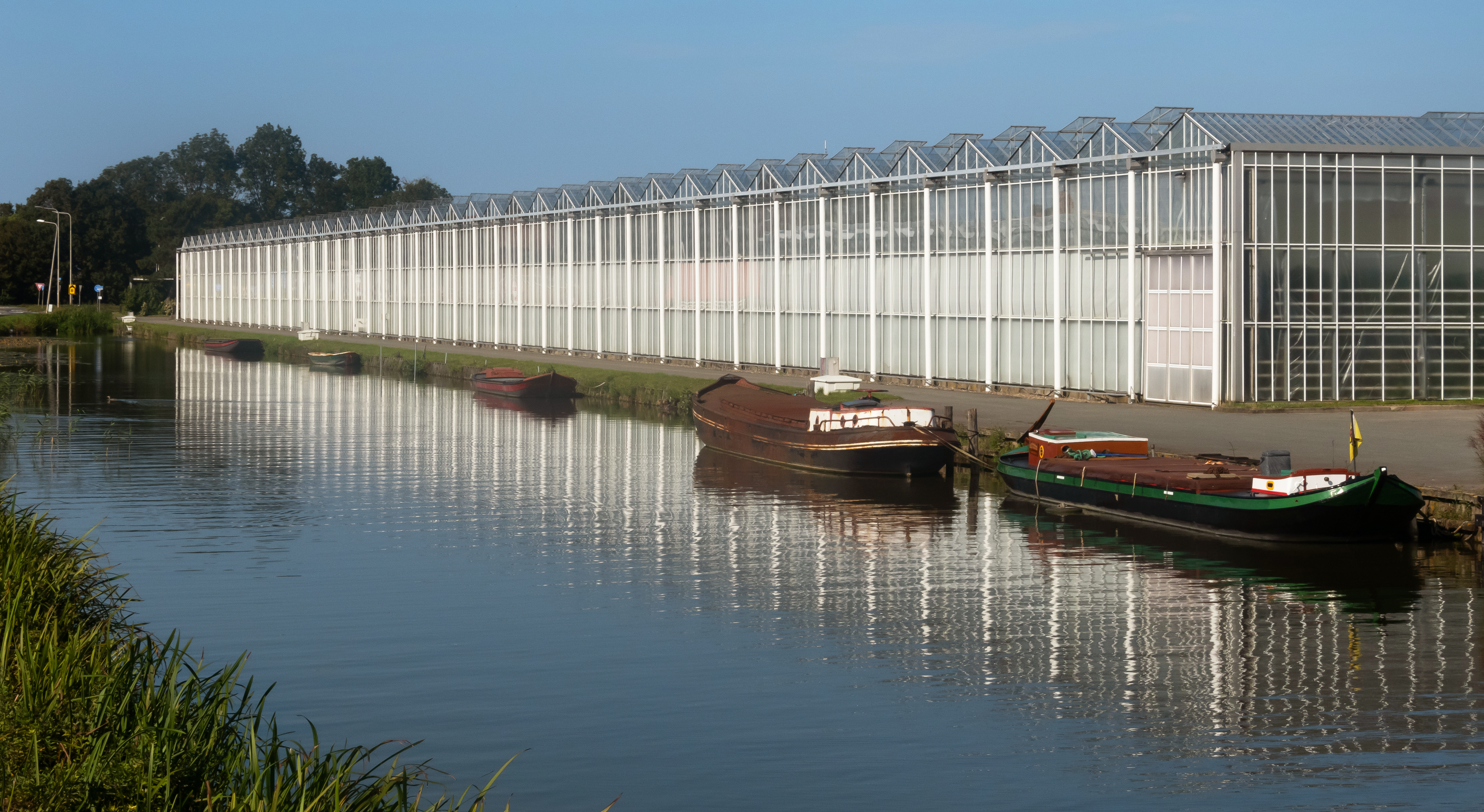
Greenhouses at the Wateringseweg
