= 's-Gravenzande =

- Town
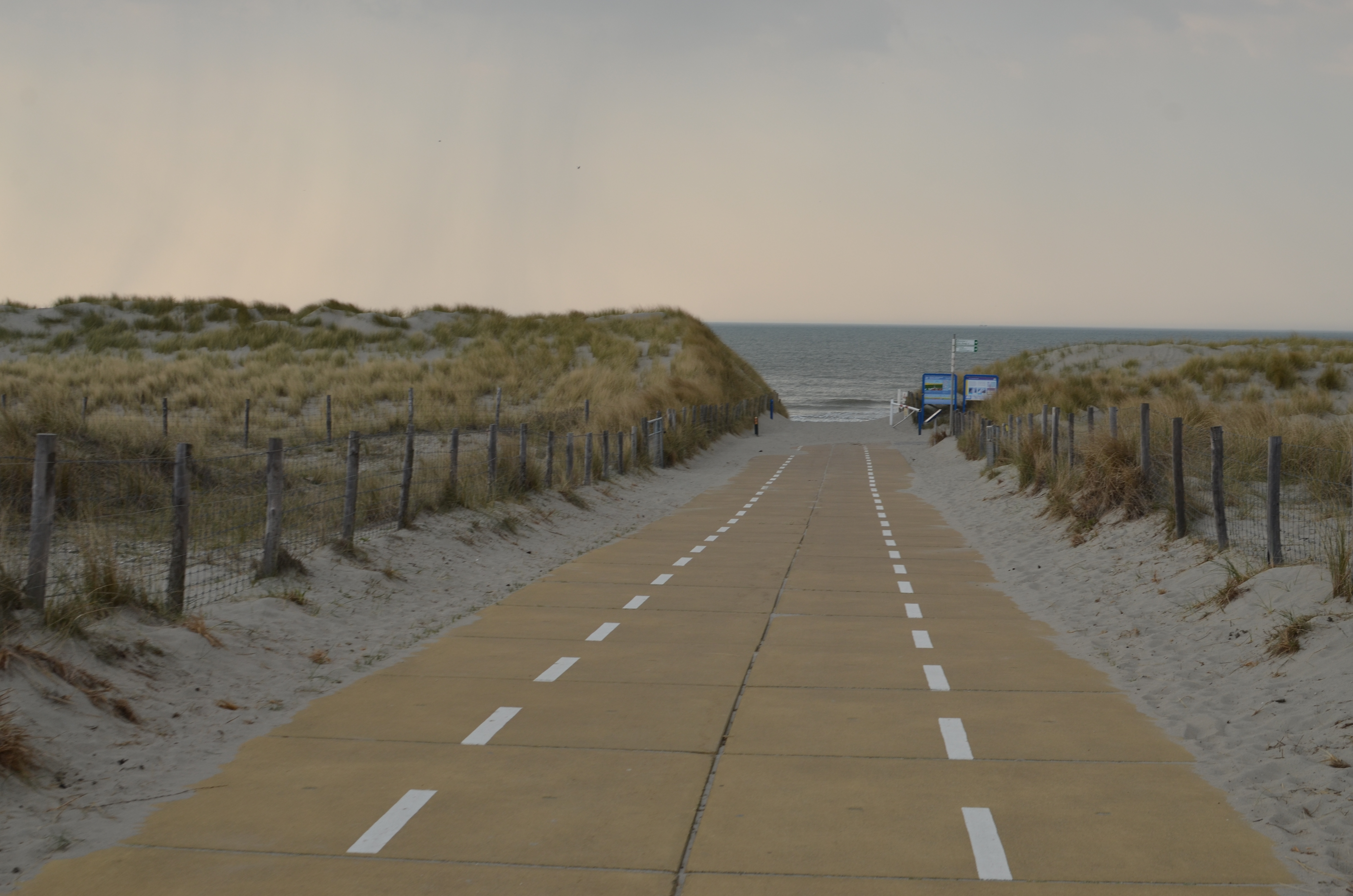
- The beach at Arendsduin

- Flag Coat of arms

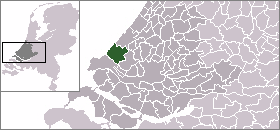

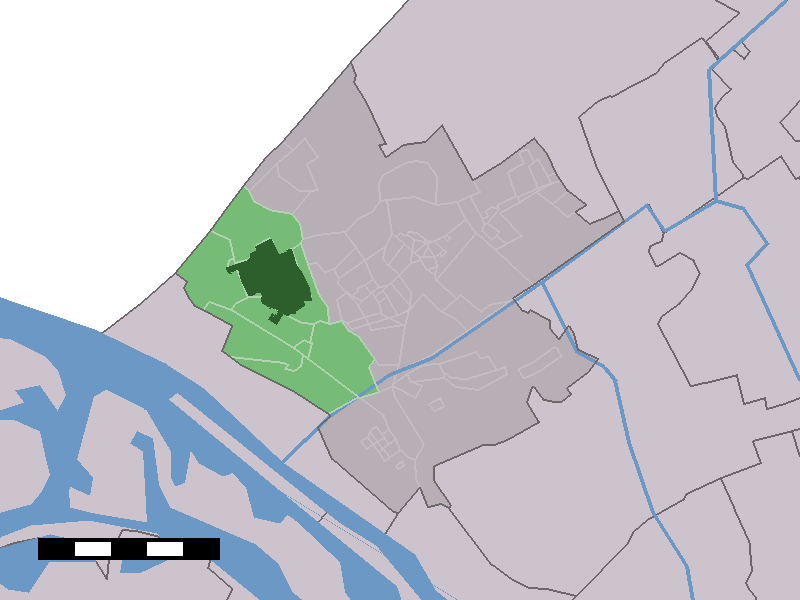
- The town centre (dark green) and the statistical district (light green) of 's-Gravenzande in the municipality of Westland.
- Coordinates: city(19190) 52°0′N 4°10′E
- Country: Netherlands
- Province: South Holland
- Municipality: Westland

Population (2023-01-01)
  - Total: 23,470
- Postal code: 2692-2694
- Area code: 0174

's‑Gravenzande is a town in the province of South Holland, in the Netherlands. It is a part of the municipality of Westland, and lies about 12 kilometres (7.5 mi) southwest of The Hague. Until 2004, it was a separate municipality and covered an area of 20.77 km^{2} (8.02 sq mi) of which 3.38 km^{2} (1.31 sq mi) is water.

The town of 's‑Gravenzande had 15,241 inhabitants in 2011. The built-up area of the town was 2.7 km^{2} (1.0 sq mi), and contained 5,879 residences.

As of 1 January 2023, 's‑Gravenzande is the largest town in Westland with 23.470 inhabitants.

The former municipality of 's‑Gravenzande also included the township of Heenweg.

== History ==
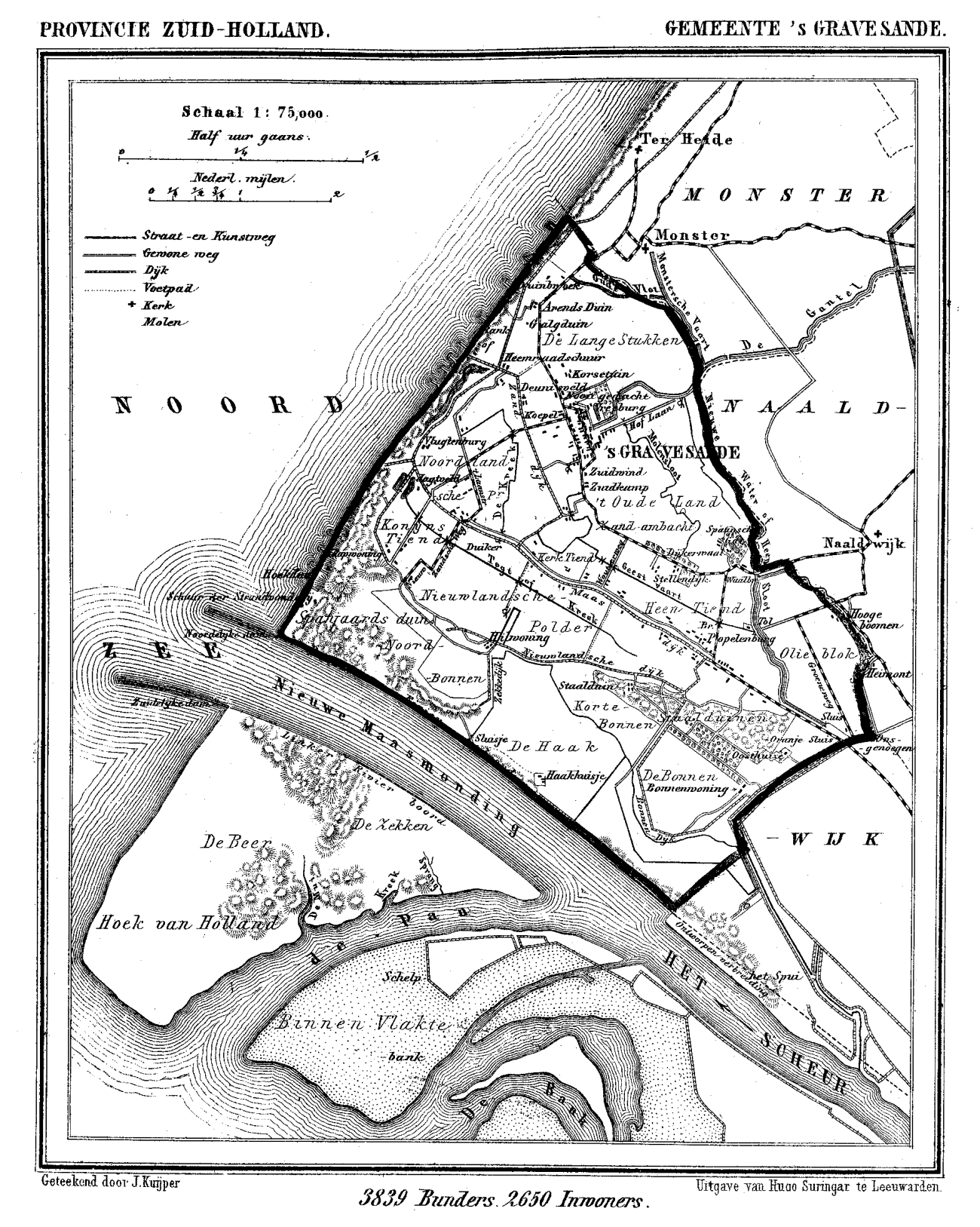
's-Gravenzande in 1868

's-Gravenzande is the only place in the Westland with a history as a town ("stad"). 's-Gravenzande was granted town rights ("stadsrechten") in 1246 by Count William II of Holland who, just like his father Count Floris IV, regularly resided at his estate near the town. It is therefore the only town in Westland.

Machteld van Brabant, daughter of Duke Henry I and wife of Floris IV, was responsible for building the town's church, and gave it a Madonna statue to which miraculous powers were attributed. 's-Gravenzande subsequently became a pilgrimage site.

The neighborhood of Gravesend, Brooklyn, New York in the United States is said by some to have been named for 's-Gravenzande. A 1656 Dutch map of Nova Belgica (New Netherland) confirms this, as it shows several Dutch names of towns like Vlissingen (Flushing), Breukelen (Brooklyn), Amersfoort (Flatlands), Heemstee (Hempstead) and Gravesant ('s-Gravenzande).
