= Les Patrons Cuisiniers =

Dutch association of quality restaurants

Les Patrons Cuisiniers is a culinary association of quality restaurants in the Netherlands.

The partnership was established on 14 October 1991. It came into existence due to the founders being unhappy with the direction of older culinary partnerships. They also wanted more attention for the “White Brigade” (kitchen crew) instead of ownership. Membership is open for head chefs with proven culinary quality. Hence all members have Michelin stars awarded to them.

Chairperson of “Les Patron Cuiseniers” is former chef Cees Helder, who had been rewarded ‘’’three’’’ Michelin stars while cooking at restaurant Parkheuvel.

== Founding Members ==
- Maartje Boudeling (former head chef Inter Scaldes)
- Paul Fagel
- Constant Fonk (De Oude Rosmolen)
- John Halvemaan
- Cees Helder (Parkheuvel)
- Toine Hermsen
- John Kern (Hooge Heerlijkheid, Middelharnis)
- Emmanuel Mertens (L'Auberge)
- Henk Savelberg

== Present members ==
Restaurant	Place	Head chef
Bij Jef	Den Hoorn	Jef Schuur
Lucas Rive	Hoorn	Lucas Rive
De Lindenhof	Giethoorn	Martin Kruithof
De Groene Lantaarn	Staphorst	Jarno Eggen
't Lansink	Hengelo	Lars van Galen
De Swarte Ruijter	Holten	Erik de Mönnink
La Provence	Driebergen-Rijsenburg	André van Alten
De Nederlanden	Vreeland	Wilco Berends
212	Amsterdam	Richard van Oostenbrugge & Thomas Groot
Daalder	Amsterdam	Dennis Huwaë
Mos Amsterdam	Amsterdam	Egon van Hoof
Olivijn	Haarlem	Menno Post
Calla's	The Hague	Ronald van Roon Marcel van der Kleijn
Parkheuvel	Rotterdam	Erik van Loo
Perceel	Capelle aan den IJssel	Jos Grootscholten
Meliefste	Wolphaartsdijk	Thijs Meliefste
De Kromme Watergang	Hoofdplaat	Edwin Vinke
Restaurant Wiesen	Eindhoven	Yuri Wiesen
De Lindehof	Nuenen	Soenil Bahadoer
Brienen aan de Maas	Well	René Brienen
Valuas	Venlo	Eric Swaghoven
Savelberg	Bangkok	Henk Savelberg
