= List of Dutch chefs =

A list of Dutch chefs. Chefs who have held or hold Michelin starred restaurants are marked with a star.

- Jerry Bastiaan
- Ron Blaauw
- Jonnie Boer
- Joop Braakhekke
- Gert-Jan Cieremans
- François Geurds /
- Cees Helder
- Sergio Herman
- Ida Kleijnen
- Erik van Loo
- Mario Uva
- Mario Ridder
- Michel van Riswijk
- Jeroen Robberegt
- Jankees Roggeveen
- Henk Savelberg
- Angélique Schmeinck
- Sidney Schutte
- Cas Spijkers
- Rudolph van Veen
- Paul van Waarden
- Hans van Wolde
