= Paul van Waarden (chef) =

Dutch head chef (born 1966)

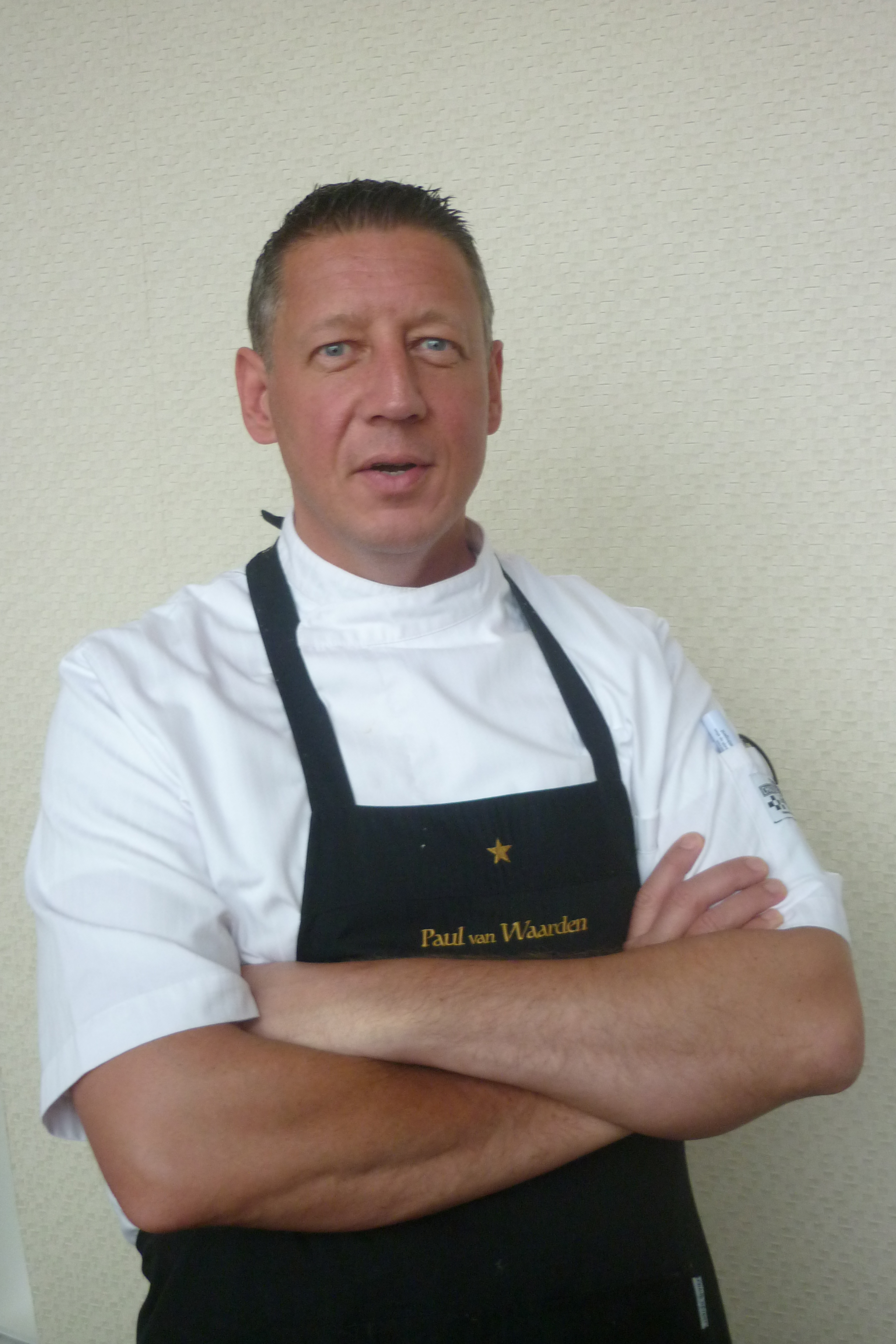
- Born: 20 February 1966 (age 60); Haarlem
- Occupation: Chef
- Employer: self-employed
- Known for: Michelin starred Paul van Waarden

Paul van Waarden is a Dutch head chef, known for his cooking in the Michelin-starred restaurant Paul van Waarden.

Van Waarden was born in Haarlem, but raised in Lisse, Huizen and Goes. In Goes he went to the Vocational school where he studied "Consumptieve technieken" (culinary skills). After his study he worked and trained at Oudt Leyden, Parkheuvel (one year under Cees Helder) and Vreugd en Rust (18 months under Henk Savelberg). After that, he became head chef at Seinpost.

== Restaurants ==
In 1998, Van Waarden opened his restaurant De keuken van Waarden in Wassenaar. This restaurant was later moved to Rijswijk and changed its name to Paul van Waarden. The loss of the Michelin star for 2013 was a real shock for the restaurant and they requested a discussion with Michelin. The restaurant closed down unexpectedly on 21 March 2013, to avoid formal bankruptcy.

In 2009, Van Waarden, together with his business partner René Michielsen, opened Restaurant At Sea in Scheveningen. In 2013, one week after the demise of Paul van Waarden the restaurant went bankrupt. The restaurant was quickly saved by new owners Rob Leusink and Paul Corten, already a business partner of Van Waarden, and was fully back in business at 12 April 2013. Michielsen and Van Waarden are still involved in the restaurant.

In 2012, Van Waarden in cooperation with Henk Au and John Chau and with business partner Paul Corten, opened De Keuken Van Waarden Azië in Rijswijk.

== Awards ==
- One Michelin star: 2002-2012

== Books ==
- 2007: Nieuw Nederlands Kookboek (Dutch)
- 2008: Modern Dutch Cuisine (English)
