= Paul van Waarden =

Paul van Waarden may refer to:

- Paul van Waarden (chef) (born 1966), Dutch chef
- Paul van Waarden (restaurant), former Dutch Michelin starred restaurant, owned by the eponymous chef
