= Kasteel Heemstede =

Coordinates: 52°1′58.8″N 5°7′30.36″E

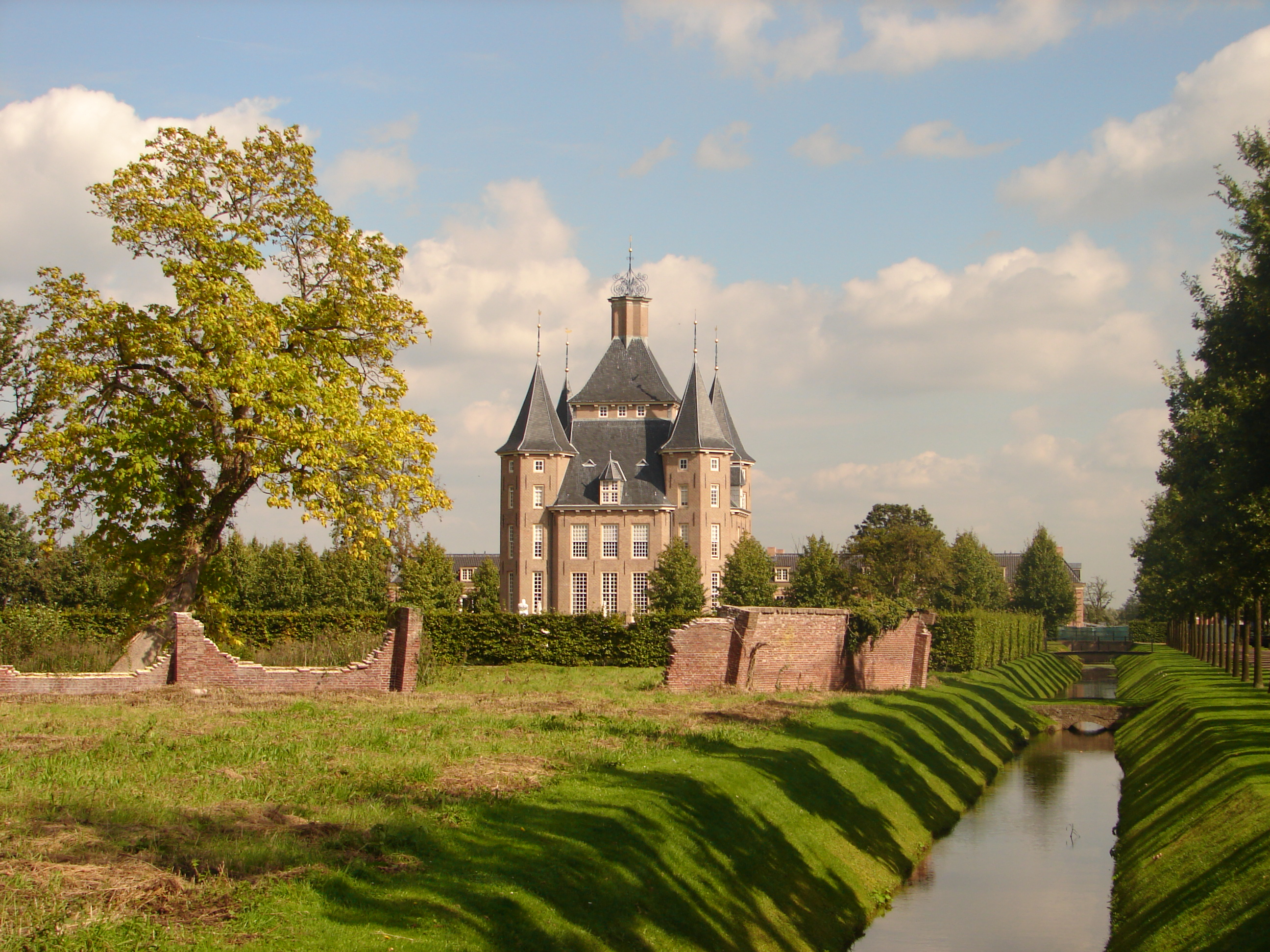
- Interactive map of Kasteel Heemstede

Restaurant information
- Established: 2002
- Head chef: André van Doorn
- Food type: French
- Rating: Michelin Guide
- Location: Heemsteedseweg 20, Houten, 3992 LS, Netherlands
- Seating capacity: 50
- Website: Official website

Kasteel Heemstede is a restaurant in Houten, Netherlands. It is a fine dining restaurant that was awarded one Michelin star for the periods 2003-2008 and 2011–present. The restaurant is located in the souterrain of the eponymous castle, although it was in fact an buitenplaats.

GaultMillau awarded the restaurant 16 out of 20 points.

Owner and head chef of Kasteel Heemstede is André van Doorn, who opened the restaurant in 2002.

Restaurant Kasteel Heemstede is a member of the Les Patrons Cuisiniers.

== History ==
The original building was built around 1645. After a chequered past, it burned down in 1987. New owners came and went, as no one could finance the rebuilding. Finally it was sold to building company WCN, later Phanos (company). They started the renovation of the building that was completed in 2002.

== See also ==
- List of Michelin starred restaurants in the Netherlands
