= Villa Rozenrust =

Coordinates: 52°5′31.04″N 4°24′32.3″E

- Interactive map of Villa Rozenrust

Restaurant information
- Established: 1968
- Owner: Family Raimondi
- Food type: Italian
- Location: Veursestraatweg 104, Leidschendam, 2265 CG, Netherlands
- Website: Official website

Villa Rozenrust is a restaurant in Leidschendam, Netherlands. It is a fine dining restaurant that was awarded one Michelin star in 1976 and retained that rating until 1989. In 1993 it was again awarded a Michelin star and retained that rating until 1999.

One of the head chefs that worked here, was Cees Helder, later to become the first Dutch head chef to be rewarded three Michelin stars. Other head chefs were Huub Biro, Roberto de Luca, Christian van der Linden, Danny van Wessel and Luca Malagnino.

In the second star period, head chef was Marcel van Lier, who took over from Lambert Stuifbergen in 1994.

The restaurant was founded by Giovanni Matarazzi. He sold the restaurant in 1998. After that, several owners came in and went again in quick succession, until in 2007 the Raimondi family took over and ownership stabilized.

In 2006 the restaurant changed course, shed of the Dutch-Italian-styled kitchen and went over to a pure Italian styled kitchen. At present, the restaurant carries the name Raimondi's Villa Rozenrust.

== See also ==
- List of Michelin starred restaurants in the Netherlands
