= De Groene Lantaarn =

Coordinates: 52°41′47.86″N 6°26′1.03″E

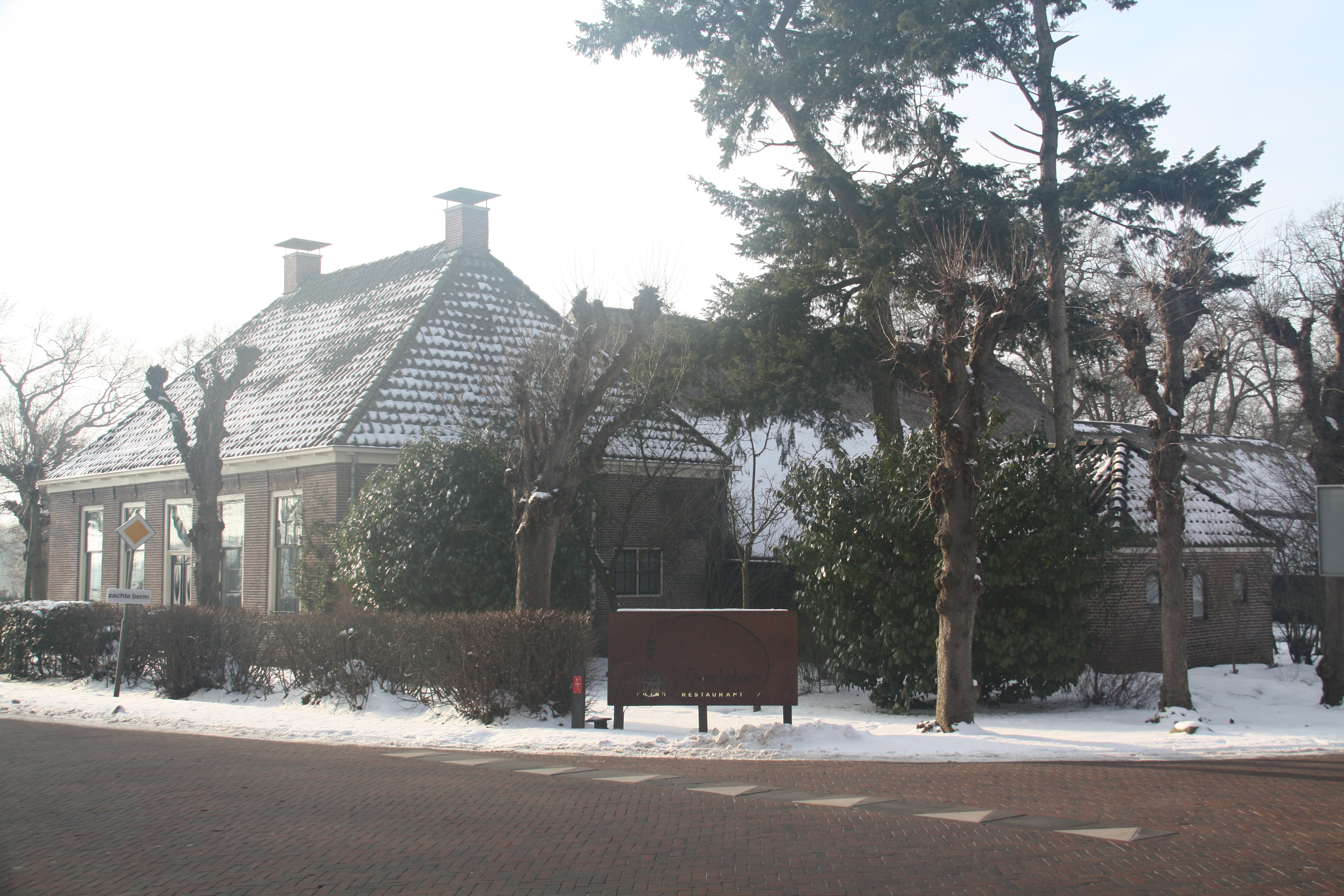
- Interactive map of De Groene Lantaarn

Restaurant information
- Established: 2009
- Closed: 2026
- Head chef: Jarno Eggen
- Food type: French
- Rating: Michelin Guide
- Location: Hoogeveenseweg 17, Zuidwolde, 7921 PC, Netherlands
- Seating capacity: 50
- Website: Official website

De Groene Lantaarn was a restaurant located in Zuidwolde in the Netherlands. It was a fine dining restaurant that was awarded its first Michelin star in 2011 and held this until 2015. It received its second Michelin star in 2016.

The Head chef of the kitchen is Jarno Eggen. The restaurant is a member of Les Patrons Cuisiniers.

The restaurant is housed in an old Saxonian farmhouse—where the oldest parts of the farmhouse was dated to exist since the end of the 1700s.

Around 1986–1987, there was already a restaurant De Groene Lantaarn located in the building, run by Mr. J.J. Vierstra. In 2000, it showed up as restaurant In de Groene Lantaarn with Mr. Jan Jager as the owner. In May 2009, Jager sold the restaurant to Jarno Eggen and Cindy Donker. They both had worked at two-starred restaurant De Lindenhof in Giethoorn, Eggens as chef, Donker as maitre.

The restaurant closed in May 2026.

== See also ==
- List of Michelin-starred restaurants in the Netherlands
