= Inter Scaldes =

Coordinates: 51°27′25.07″N 4°1′17.34″E

- Interactive map of Inter Scaldes

Restaurant information
- Established: 1968
- Head chef: Jannis Brevet
- Food type: French
- Rating: Michelin Guide
- Location: Zandweg 2, Kruiningen, 4416 NA, Netherlands
- Seating capacity: 55
- Website: website

Inter Scaldes is a restaurant located in Kruiningen in the Netherlands. It is a fine dining restaurant that is awarded one Michelin stars from 1977 to 1983, two stars from 1984 to 2017 and three stars as of 2018 GaultMillau awarded them 19.50 points (out of 20).

Restaurant Inter Scaldes earned its second star in 1984 under the leadership of head chef Maartje Boudeling. In 2001 the present head chef Jannis Brevet (ex-Helianthushof) took over. In 2018 Inter Scaldes earned its third star, under chef Jannis Brevet

Inter Scaldes (Latin for "Between the Scheldt") is a member of Les Patrons Cuisiniers and Tradition Qualité.

== Building ==
The restaurant is located just outside Kruiningen. The house was built in 1927 by a veterinarian, who lived there until 1953. After that, it was in use as barracks for the Royal Marechaussee. In 1968, after the purchase by Maartje en Kees Boudeling, it became a restaurant. The building is surrounded by an English garden.

The restaurant burned down on 10 September 2003. It reopened in May 2004.

== See also ==
- List of Michelin starred restaurants in the Netherlands
- List of Michelin starred restaurants
