= Savelberg =

Coordinates: 52°4′10.72″N 4°22′10.45″E

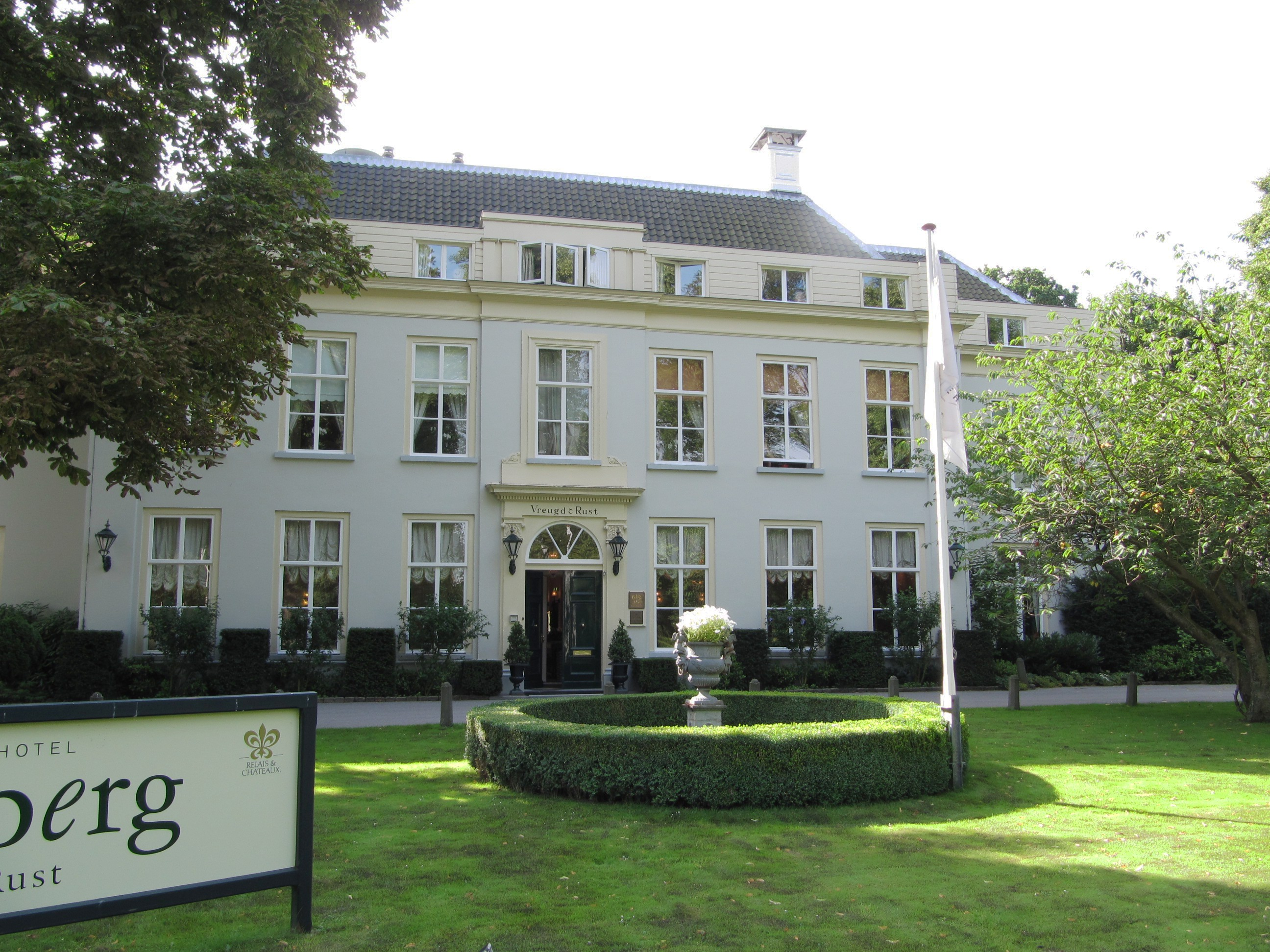
- Interactive map of Savelberg

Restaurant information
- Established: 1997
- Closed: 2014
- Head chef: Henk Savelberg
- Food type: French
- Rating: Michelin Guide
- Location: Oosteinde 14, Voorburg, 2271 EH, Netherlands
- Seating capacity: 70
- Website: Official website

Restaurant Savelberg was a restaurant in Voorburg, Netherlands. It was a fine dining restaurant that was awarded one Michelin star in 1997 and retained that rating until 2014. The restaurant closed on 27 September 2014 (this was announced in July 2014).

In 2013, GaultMillau awarded the restaurant 16.0 out of 20 points.

Savelberg was one of the founders of Les Patrons Cuisiniers.

Owner and head chef was Henk Savelberg. He had part-owned the predecessor Vreugd en Rust until he was bought out when the company collapsed. In 1995 he bought the mansion where Vreugd en Rust was located and closed the restaurant. After a two-year renovation he reopened the mansion as hotel-restaurant Savelberg.

== See also ==
- List of Michelin starred restaurants in the Netherlands
