= Bij Jef =

Coordinates: 53°1′29″N 4°44′59.57″E

- Interactive map of Bij Jef

Restaurant information
- Established: before 2001
- Head chef: Jef Schuur
- Food type: French, international
- Rating: Michelin Guide
- Location: Herenstraat 34, Den Hoorn, Texel, 1797 AJ, Netherlands
- Seating capacity: 45
- Website: Official website

Bij Jef (formerly: Culinaire Verwennerij Bij Jef) is a restaurant in Den Hoorn, Netherlands. It is a fine dining restaurant that was awarded one Michelin star for the period 2009–present.

GaultMillau awarded the restaurant 16 out of 20 points.

Head chef of Bij Jef is Jef Schuur. The restaurant is a member of Les Patrons Cuisiniers since 2012.

== See also ==
- List of Michelin starred restaurants in the Netherlands
