= Le Chevalier =

Le Chevalier can refer to:

- Le Chevalier (restaurant), Michelin starred restaurant in Delft, Netherlands
- Le Chevalier D'Eon, a 24-episode anime television series
