= De Kromme Watergang =

Coordinates: 51°22′38.16″N 3°36′10.68″E

- Interactive map of De Kromme Watergang

Restaurant information
- Established: 1993
- Head chef: Edwin Vinke
- Food type: Local, French
- Rating: Michelin Guide
- Location: Slijkplaat 6, Slijkplaat, Hoofdplaat, 4513 KK, Netherlands
- Seating capacity: 50
- Website: Official website

De Kromme Watergang is a restaurant located in Slijkplaat, Hoofdplaat in the Netherlands. It is a fine dining restaurant that was awarded one Michelin star in the period 2005–2011. Much to their surprise, they were rewarded two Michelin stars in 2012. GaultMillau awarded the restaurant 18.5 out of 20 points in its guide for 2013.

De Kromme Watergang is a member of Les Patrons Cuisiniers.

== See also ==
- List of Michelin starred restaurants in the Netherlands
