= Le Chevalier (restaurant) =

Coordinates: 52°0′38.52″N 4°21′23.15″E

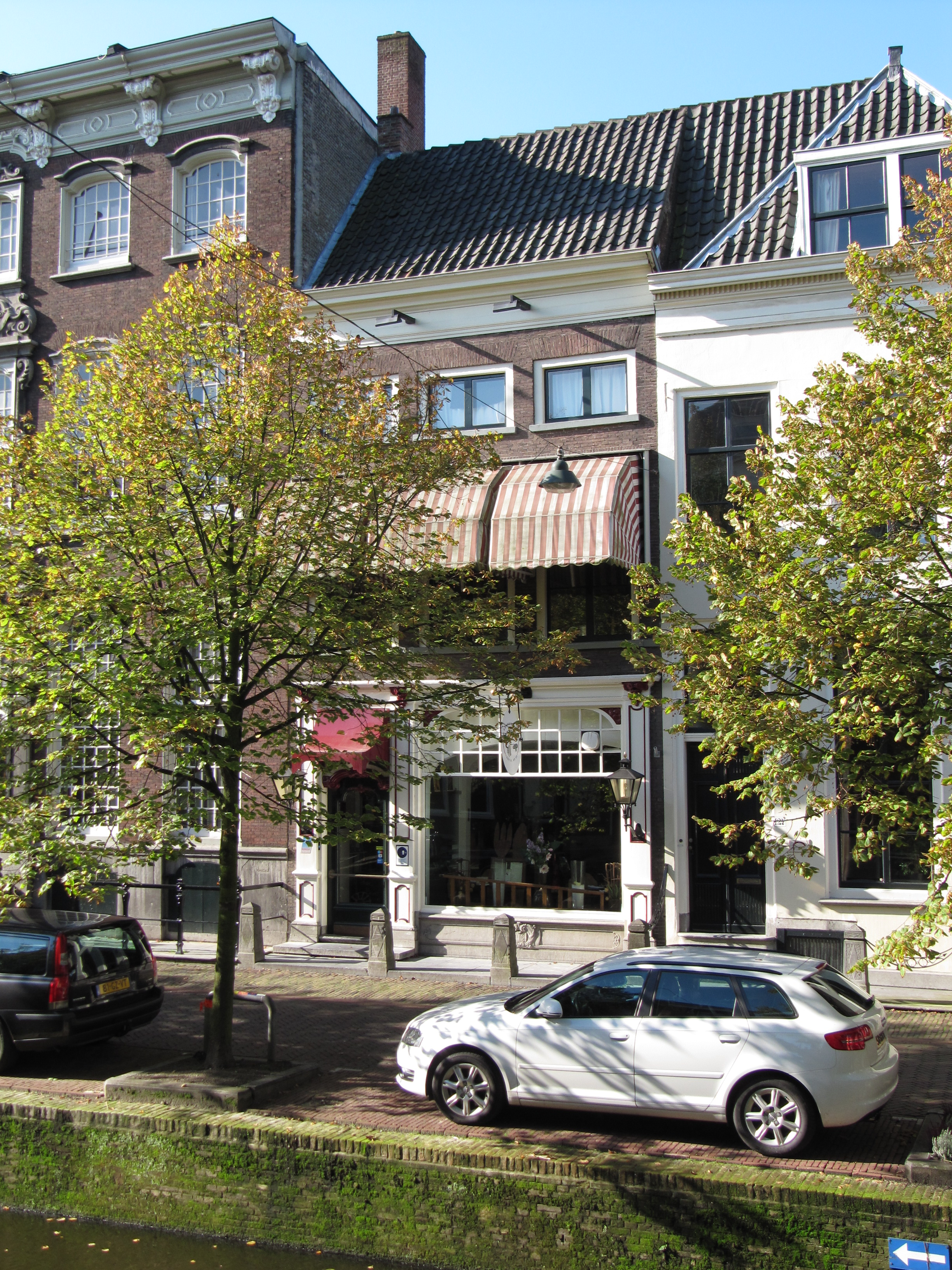
- The building in 2010
- Interactive map of Le Chevalier

Restaurant information
- Rating: Michelin Guide
- Location: Oude Delft 125, Delft, 2611 BE, Netherlands

Le Chevalier is a defunct restaurant in Delft, Netherlands. It was a fine dining restaurant that was awarded one Michelin star in the periods 1980–1989.

Cees Helder, was head chef from 1980 to 1984.

== See also ==
- List of Michelin starred restaurants in the Netherlands
