= Brienen aan de Maas =

Restaurant in the Netherlands

Coordinates: 51°32′53.69″N 6°5′27.75″E

- Interactive map of Brienen aan de Maas

Restaurant information
- Established: 2005
- Head chef: René Brienen
- Food type: French
- Rating: Michelin Guide
- Location: Grotestraat 11, Well, 5855 AK, Netherlands
- Seating capacity: 60
- Website: Official website

Brienen aan de Maas is a restaurant in Well in the Netherlands. It is a fine dining restaurant that is awarded one Michelin star in the period 2007–present.

GaultMillau awarded the restaurant 16 out of 20 points.

Owner and head chef of Brienen aan de Maas is René Brienen. He opened this restaurant in 2005, about a year after his earlier Michelin starred restaurant Onder de Boompjes went bankrupt.

The restaurant is a former ferryman's café, named Café 't Veerhuis, converted to a fine dining restaurant.

== See also ==
- List of Michelin starred restaurants in the Netherlands
