= De Graaf van het Hoogveen =

Coordinates: 52°14′51.57″N 4°26′8.65″E

- Interactive map of De Graaf van het Hoogveen

Restaurant information
- Established: December 1976
- Food type: French
- Rating: Michelin Guide
- Location: Quarles van Uffordstraat 103, Noordwijk aan Zee, 2202 NE, Netherlands
- Seating capacity: 8 tables

De Graaf van het Hoogveen was a restaurant located in Badhotel Zeerust in Noordwijk aan Zee, Netherlands. It was a fine dining restaurant that was awarded one Michelin star in 1982 and retained that rating until 1988.

De Graaf van het Hoogveen was a small restaurant with just eight tables. The restaurant was famous for its wine list with 650 wines and its wine cellar of 15,000 bottles of high quality wines. It received several national and international awards for it.

== Head chefs ==
- 1978-1980: Adriaan de Jong
- 1981-1983: Henk Savelberg
- 1983: Paul van der Meij
- 1984-1986: Ricardo van Ede
- 1987-1990: Nico Lijding

== History ==
Badhotel Zeerust started in 1934 as a small guesthouse in a double villa. In 1962, Joop Droogh took over from his father Lambert Droogh. He started an expansion and improvement program, adding many facilities and rooms to the former guesthouse. Joop Droogh married his former receptionist Ine Goossens in 1969. In 1977, he added a restaurant to the hotel and Ine started a career as maitre and sommelier. In 1978, the hotel consisted of 32 luxury rooms, conference rooms, swimming pool, sauna and solarium.

The restaurant lost its star in 1989, due to divorce and subsequently Ine Goossens leaving the restaurant.

== Awards ==
- Michelin star: 1982–1988
- Elsevier Bouquet Finest Wine List: 1980
- Giscours-concours Finest Wine List of the Netherlands: 1981
- The Wine Spectator Grand Award: 1987

== See also ==
- List of Michelin starred restaurants in the Netherlands
