= Seinpost =

Coordinates: 52°6′32.77″N 4°16′31.93″E

- Interactive map of Seinpost

Restaurant information
- Head chef: Gert-Jan Cieremans
- Food type: French, Fish
- Rating: Michelin Guide
- Location: Zeekant 60, Scheveningen, 2586 AD, Netherlands
- Seating capacity: 70
- Website: Official website

Seinpost is a restaurant located in Scheveningen, Netherlands. It is a fine dining restaurant that was awarded one Michelin star in the periods 1985-1989 and 2006–present. It held a Bib Gourmand at least in the period 2001–2003.

GaultMillau awarded the restaurant 17.0 out of 20 points.

The Head chef of Seinpost is Gert-Jan Cieremans. Cieremans had previously worked in the Michelin-starred Parkheuvel under Cees Helder, before becoming head chef at Seinpost in 1996. The head chef in the first Michelin period was Henk Savelberg.

A company named "Tartuffe Holding", comprising Henk Savelberg and a group of friends, set up Restaurant Seinpost in 1983. In 1989, they started Vreugd en Rust and Savelberg moved. As a consequence of Savelberg leaving, Seinpost lost its star.

In 1986, politician Ed Nijpels was an honorary commissioner of the company that ran Seinpost. When he became minister, he had to give up all other positions he held, including this one. Unfortunately, Seinpost forgot to inform the Chamber of Commerce that Nijpels had given up his position, so a weekly magazine tried to create a row over it. The matter was soon defused.

== Head chefs ==
- 1996–present: Gert-Jan Cieremans
- 1990-1996: Joop Zwiep
- 1983-1989: Henk Savelberg

== See also ==
- List of French restaurants
- List of Michelin starred restaurants in the Netherlands
