= Maartje Boudeling =

Dutch chef

- Born: Maartje Hoogstrate; 29 January 1939 (age 87); Yerseke
- Occupation: Chef
- Employer: retired
- Known for: Michelin starred Inter Scaldes
- Spouse: Kees Boudeling

Maartje Boudeling (Yerseke, 29 January 1939) is a retired head chef, known for her cooking in the Michelin starred restaurant Inter Scaldes in Kruiningen, Netherlands.

Boudeling went to school at the MULO in Yerseke, before studying in Rotterdam to become a hairdresser. After finishing that course, together with her sister, she opened Beauté, a hairdresser's shop. This shop went very well, but she left after marrying Kees Boudeling in 1962.

After her marriage, she started working in the family restaurant from her husband, located on the Rijksweg in Kruiningen. Building on what she had learned from her mother, she took over the kitchen. Quickly the couple realised that Maartje needed more training to realize their dream of creating a fine dining restaurant. So she started to learn French and moved over to France for training, working in several restaurants, from the Alsace to Brittany. Back home again, they started pursuing their dreams. Soon enough Boudelings cooking brought in so many customers that the restaurant became too small. By chance, a large villa in use by the Royal Marechaussee came up for sale and they too that opportunity. In 1968, they opened Inter Scaldes in the villa, where Boudelings cooking flourished. Believing in freshness of the ingredients, she refused to import ingredients to offer exclusive dishes. Instead, she orders all her fish and seafood and most of the vegetables local, sometimes ordering several times a day to maintain the freshness.

In 1978, Boudeling was awarded her first yearly Michelin star, exactly ten years after opening Inter Scaldes. In 1984, she was awarded two Michelin stars.

In 1992, Boudeling joined Les Patrons Cuisiniers (LPC) as patron-cuisinier. Earlier, in 1980, the restaurant had joined Alliance Gastronomique Néerlandaise but they moved away during the split that created the LPC.

Kees and Maartje Boudeling sold the restaurant in 2001 to Claudia and Jannis Brevet, formerly owners of Helianthushof in Uden.

Boudeling is the creator and namesake of the culinary competition for the De Zilveren Oester/Maartje Boudeling Trofee (Eng.: The Silver Oyster/Maartje Boudeling Trophy), awarded since 2006.

In 2007, Boudeling ended ninth in the List "Most inspiring chef of the past thirty years", compiled by the food guide Lekker.

== Awards ==
- 1 Michelin star: 1978-1983
- 2 Michelin stars: 1984-2001
- Nederlandse Gastronomieprijs NCK Uncle Ben's Ring: 1999
- ‘Ladychef of the year’: 2000
- Lady Chef of the Century
- Escoffier Price Alliance Gastronomique Néerlandaise: 2002

== Bibliography ==
- 1998: Koken tussen de Scheldes. Recipes Maartje Boudeling, text Fon Zwart. 90-6020-526-X
- 1998: Zilt en Zoet. Zeeuwse zaligheden uit de keuken van Inter Scaldes. Recipes Maartje Boudeling, text Jan Lagrouw, photos Kees Hageman. 90-6255-847-X
