= Vreugd en Rust =

Coordinates: 52°4′10.72″N 4°22′10.45″E

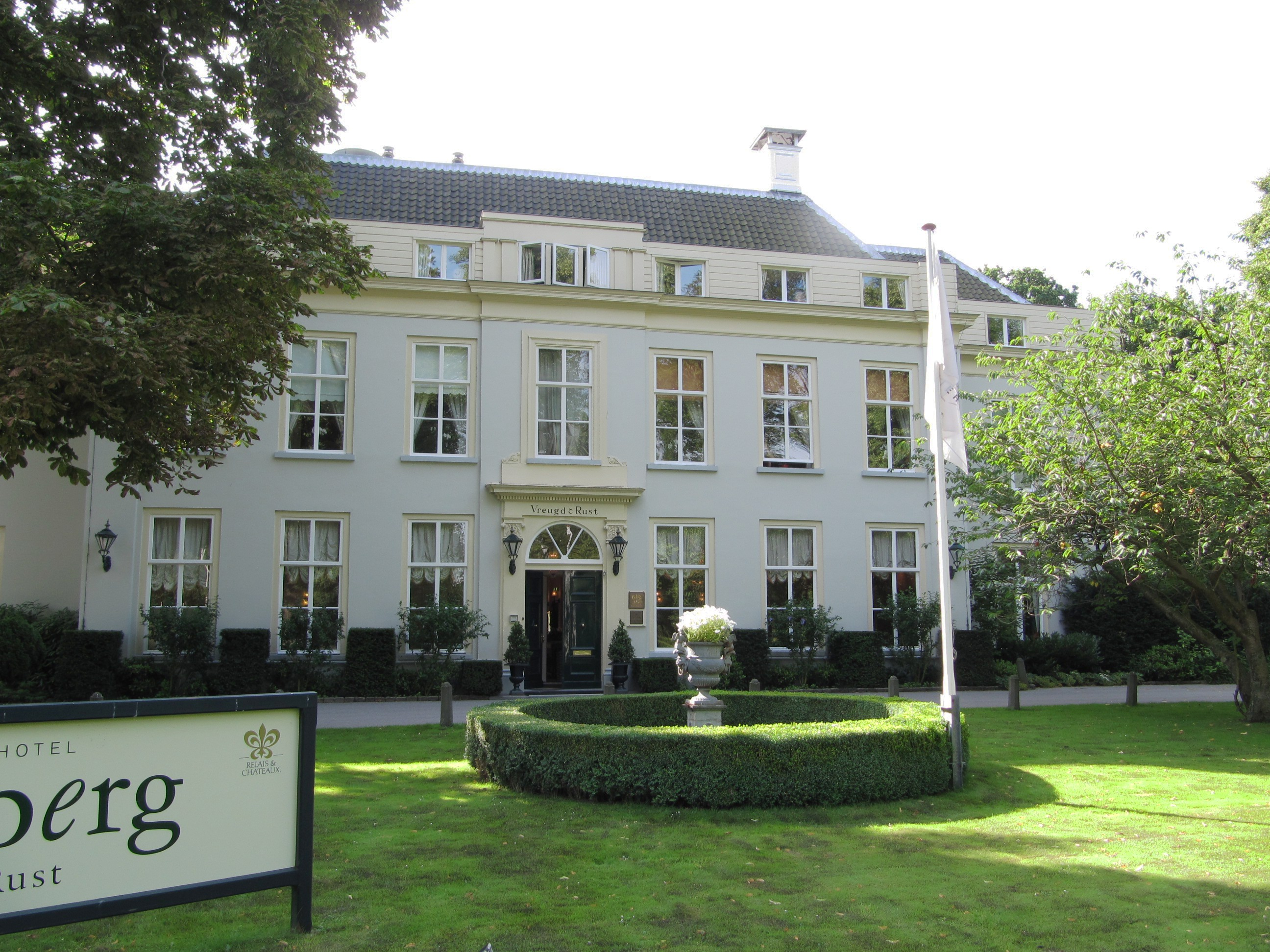
- Interactive map of Vreugd en Rust

Restaurant information
- Closed: 1995
- Head chef: Henk Savelberg
- Food type: French
- Rating: Michelin Guide
- Location: Oosteinde 14, Voorburg, 2271 EH, Netherlands

Restaurant Vreugd en Rust is a defunct restaurant in Voorburg, Netherlands. It was a fine dining restaurant that was awarded one Michelin star in 1990 and retained that rating until 1993.

Part-owner and head chef Henk Savelberg. Together with some admirers he had set up a company that first exploited restaurant Seinpost and later Vreugd en Rust. In 1993 the company collapsed and Savelberg was bought out. The new head chef was Gert Jan Hageman.

New owner Henk Savelberg closed the restaurant in 1995 and renovated the mansion. In 1997 he reopened it as restaurant-hotel Savelberg.

The building is located beside the park Vreugd en Rust in Leidschendam-Voorburg.

== See also ==
- List of Michelin starred restaurants in the Netherlands
