= Slijkplaat =

- Hamlet
- Location in the province of Zeeland in the Netherlands Slijkplaat (Netherlands)
- Coordinates: 51°22′38″N 3°36′7″E
- Country: Netherlands
- Province: Zeeland
- Municipality: Sluis

Area
  - Total: 6.93 km^{2} (2.68 sq mi)

Population
  - Total: 70
  - Density: 10/km^{2} (26/sq mi)
- Time zone: UTC+1 (CET)
  - Summer (DST): UTC+2 (CEST)
- Postal code: 4515
- Dialing code: 0117

Slijkplaat (English: Mud plate) is a hamlet in the Dutch province of Zeeland. It is located in the municipality of Sluis. The hamlet exists of two streets (one name) and 28 houses.

Restaurant De Kromme Watergang (two Michelin stars) is located in the village.

A Catholic church was built in 1953 or 1959, but closed in 2013. The church has been converted into a residential house.
