= Valuas (restaurant) =

Restaurant in Venio, Netherlands

Coordinates: 51°22′45.4″N 6°10′1″E

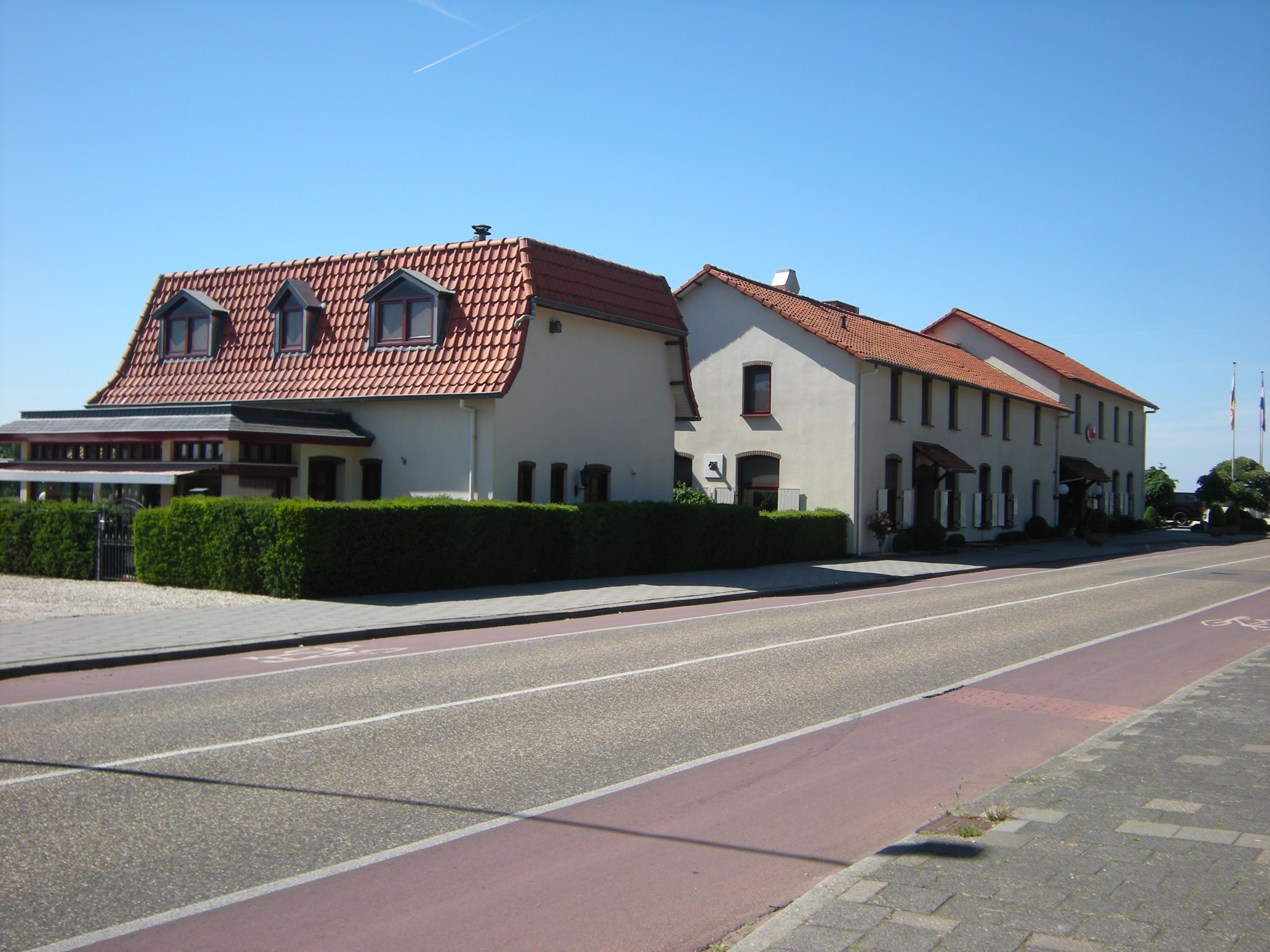
- Interactive map of Valuas

Restaurant information
- Head chef: Eric Swaghoven
- Food type: French, International
- Rating: Michelin Guide
- Location: Sint Urbanusweg 11, Venlo, 5914 CA, Netherlands
- Seating capacity: 75
- Website: Official website

Valuas is a restaurant in Venlo, Netherlands. It is a fine dining restaurant that was awarded one Michelin star for the period 2006–present.

GaultMillau awarded the restaurant 16 out of 20 points.

Head chef and half-owner of Valuas is Eric Swaghoven. His brother Marcel Swaghoven owns the other half and acts as Maître d' and sommelier

The brothers Swaghoven were raised in a hospitality family. Their father was once running Hotel Wilhelmina and later operated the bistro Valuas. Due to illness the brothers were effectively running the bistro since the mid nineteen-nineties. They own the place since 1998.

Valuas is a member of Les Patrons Cuisiniers.

== Awards ==
- 2013: Lodewijk van der Grinten Ondernemersprijs

== See also ==
- List of Michelin starred restaurants in the Netherlands
