= De Lindehof =

Coordinates: 51°28′38.74″N 5°33′8″E

- Interactive map of De Lindehof

Restaurant information
- Head chef: Soenil Bahadoer
- Food type: French
- Rating: Michelin Guide
- Location: Beekstraat 1, Nuenen, 5671 CS, Netherlands
- Seating capacity: 45
- Website: Official website

Restaurant De Lindehof is a restaurant located in Nuenen, in the Netherlands. It is a fine dining restaurant that was awarded one Michelin star in the periods 1992–1995, 2004–2014, and was awarded a second star since 2015.

Gault Millau awarded the restaurant 17 out of 20 points.

Owner and head chef of De Lindehof is Soenil Bahadoer. He bought the restaurant in 1995. Gerard Holtslag sold it after the departure of Gerard Wollerich, who was awarded the Michelin star in 1992.

De Lindehof is a member of Les Patrons Cuisiniers.

In 2012, the restaurant joined in at the "No Waste"-trend. To prevent having to throw away food due to their summer closure, it organized a "Kliekjes Avond" (Scrap Night). All guests could only order off of a surprise menu, what gave the kitchen the opportunity to vary the dishes when the supplies were running out.

== See also ==
- List of Michelin starred restaurants in the Netherlands
