= Calla's =

Coordinates: 52°5′11.89″N 4°18′47.05″E

- Interactive map of Calla's

Restaurant information
- Established: 1998
- Head chef: Ronald van Roon
- Food type: French
- Rating: Michelin Guide
- Location: Laan van Roos en Doorn 51a, The Hague, 2514 BC, Netherlands
- Seating capacity: 36
- Website: Official website

Calla's is a restaurant in The Hague, Netherlands. It is a fine dining restaurant that is awarded one Michelin star in 2002 and retained that rating until present.

In 2013, GaultMillau awarded the restaurant 16 out of 20 points.

Owner and head chef of Calla's is Ronald van Roon. The restaurant is a member of Les Patrons Cuisiniers.

== See also ==
- List of Michelin starred restaurants in the Netherlands
