= De Lindenhof =

Coordinates: 52°44′47.3″N 6°4′47.2″E

- Interactive map of De Lindenhof

Restaurant information
- Head chef: Martin Kruithof
- Food type: French, Regional
- Rating: Michelin Guide
- Location: Beulakerweg 77, Giethoorn, Netherlands
- Seating capacity: 60
- Website: Official website

De Lindenhof is a restaurant located in Giethoorn, Netherlands. It is a fine dining restaurant that was awarded one Michelin star in the period 1996-2004 and two Michelin stars in the period 2005–present. GaultMillau awarded the restaurant 18.0 out of 20 points.

De Lindenhof is a member of Les Patrons Cuisiniers.

== See also ==
- List of Michelin starred restaurants in the Netherlands
