= Onder de Boompjes =

Coordinates: 51°10′52.08″N 5°59′14.74″E

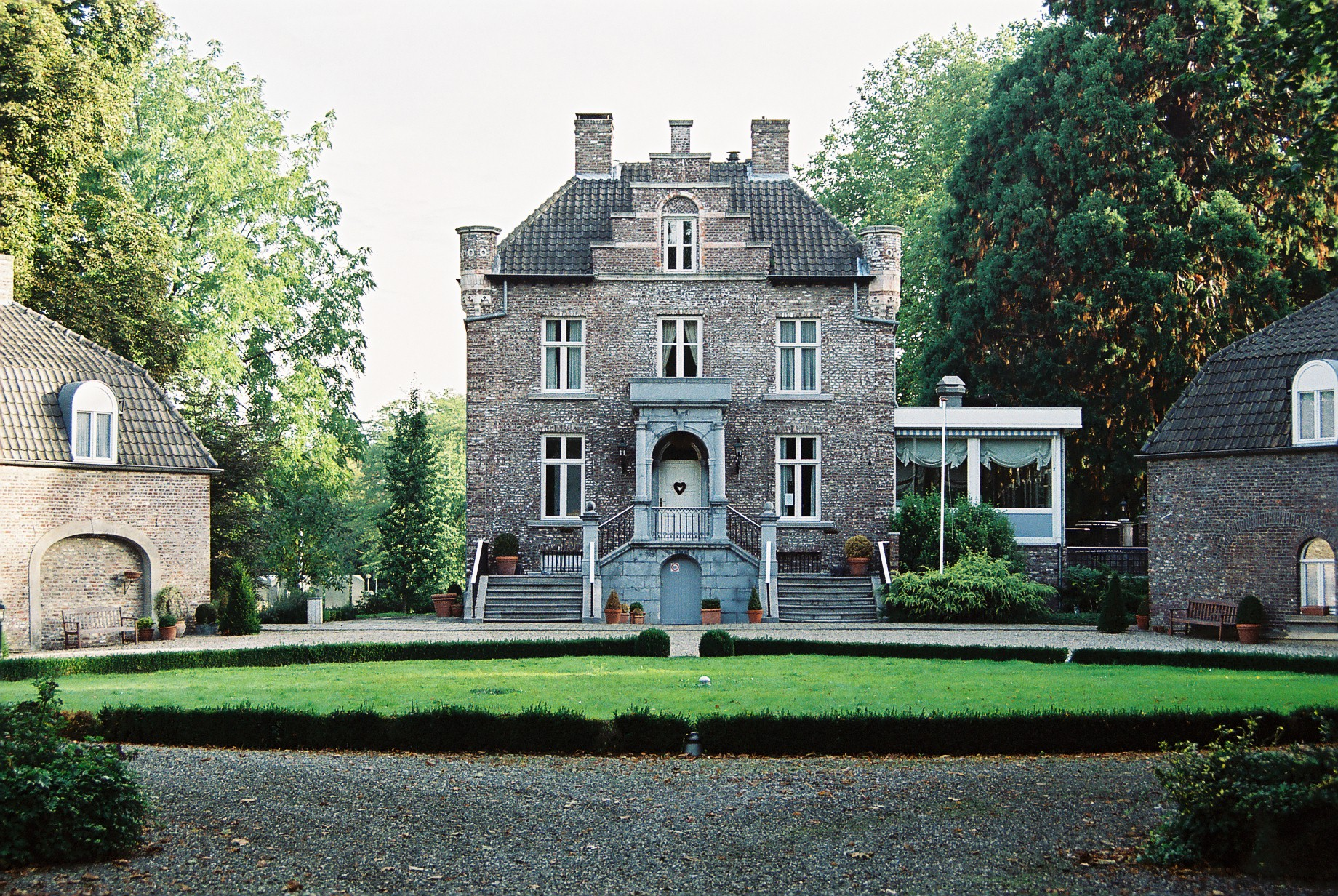
- Interactive map of Onder de Boompjes

Restaurant information
- Established: 1990
- Closed: 2004
- Head chef: René Brienen
- Food type: French
- Rating: Michelin Guide
- Location: Maastrichterweg 25, Roermond, 6041 NZ, Netherlands

Onder de Boompjes was a restaurant located in Hattem Castle in Roermond, in the Netherlands. It was a fine dining restaurant that was awarded one Michelin star in 1999 and retained that rating until 2004.

Owner and head chef of Onder de Boompjes was René Brienen.

The restaurant was originally located on Irenestraat 1 in Overloon but moved in April 2002 to Hattem Castle in Roermond.

The restaurant closed down in 2004, due to bankruptcy.

== See also ==
- List of Michelin starred restaurants in the Netherlands
