= Paul van Waarden (restaurant) =

Coordinates: 52°3′22.74″N 4°20′3.96″E

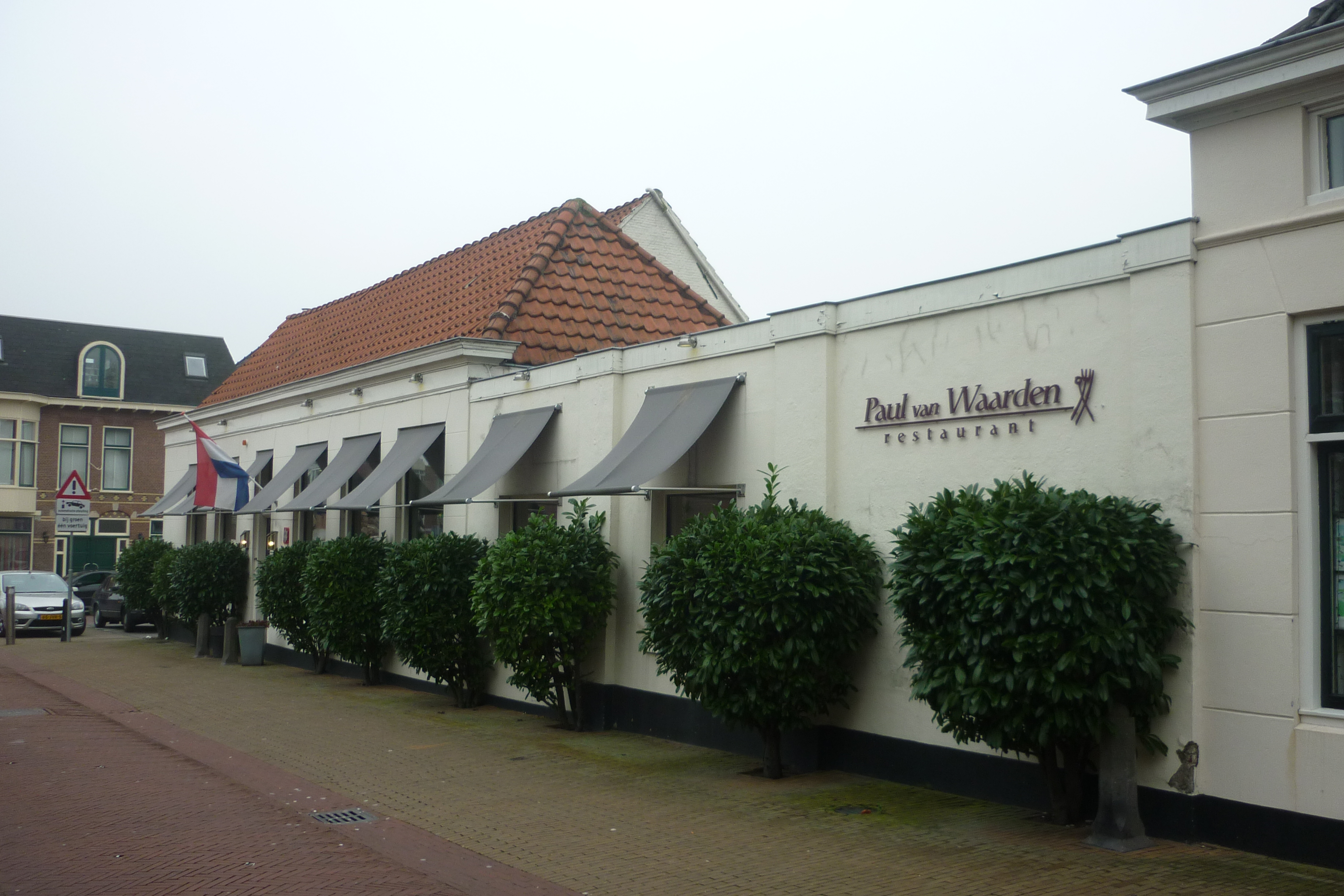
- Interactive map of Paul van Waarden

Restaurant information
- Established: 1998
- Closed: 21 March 2013
- Head chef: Paul van Waarden
- Food type: French
- Rating: Michelin Guide
- Location: Tollensstraat 10, Rijswijk, 2282 BM, Netherlands
- Website: Official website

Paul van Waarden is a defunct restaurant in Rijswijk, Netherlands. It is a fine dining restaurant that was awarded one Michelin star in 2002 and retained that rating until 2012. The loss of the Michelin star for 2013 was a real shock for the restaurant and they requested a discussion with Michelin. The restaurant closed due to a bankruptcy.

For 2013, GaultMillau awarded the restaurant 13 out of 20 points.

Head chef of Paul van Waarden was Paul van Waarden.

Originally, the restaurant was located in Wassenaar and traded under the name De keuken van Waarden. In 2001, the restaurant moved to Rijswijk and changed its name.

== See also ==
- List of Michelin starred restaurants in the Netherlands
