= Perceel =

Michelin starred restaurant in Capelle aan den IJssel

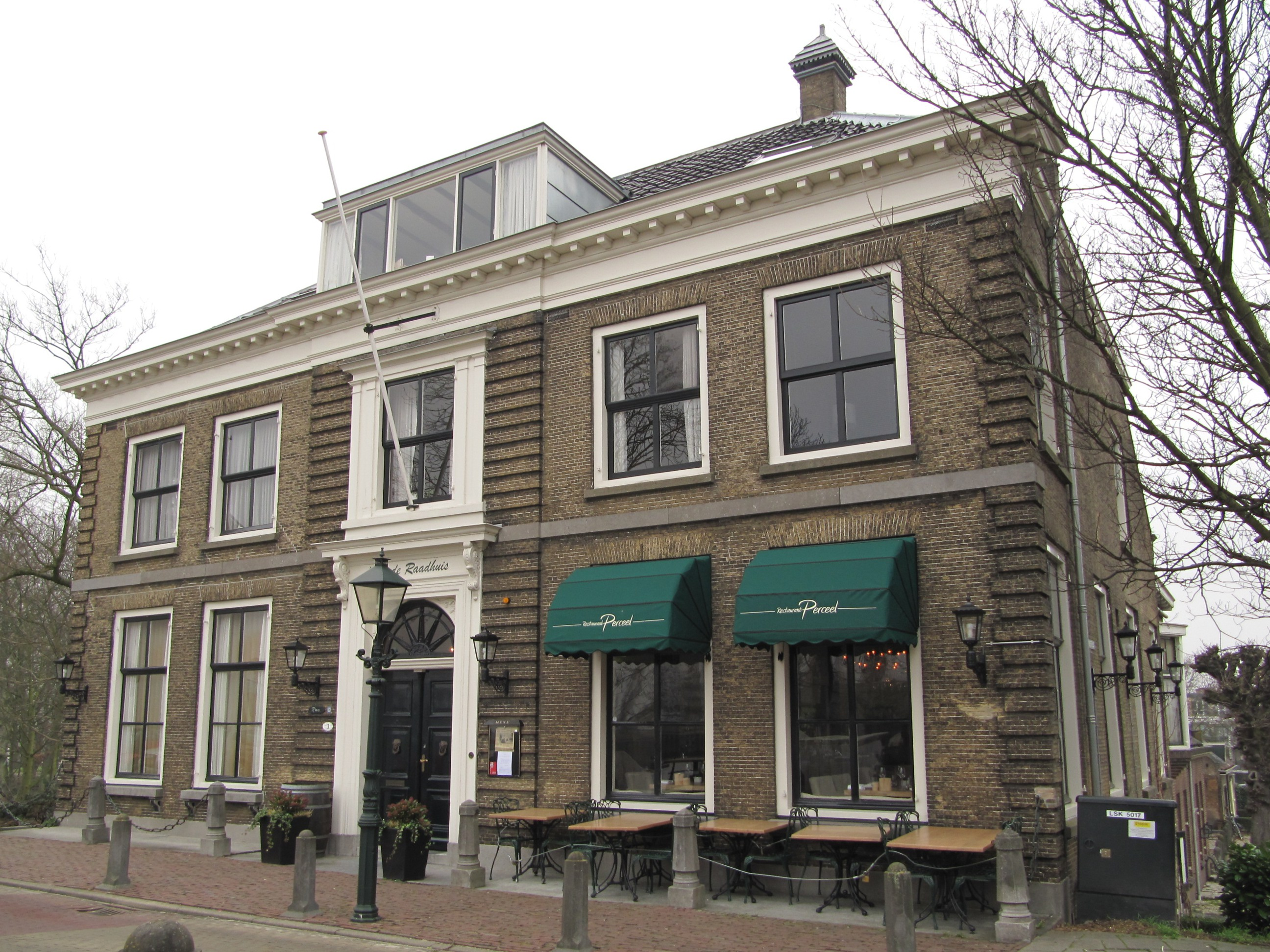
- Interactive map of Perceel

Restaurant information
- Established: 24 July 2010
- Head chef: Jos Grootscholten
- Food type: French
- Rating: Michelin Guide
- Location: Dorpsstraat 3, Capelle aan den IJssel, 2902 BC, Netherlands
- Website: Official website

Perceel is a restaurant in Capelle aan den IJssel, Netherlands. It is a restaurant with French cuisine that is awarded one Michelin star in 2012.

== Location ==
The restaurant is located in Capelle aan den IJssel, east of Rotterdam. The building is a Rijksmonument from the second quarter of the 19th century that was known as 't Oude Raadhuis and Oude Regthuys. The restaurant overlooks the Hollandse IJssel river.

== See also ==
- List of Michelin starred restaurants in the Netherlands
