= De Oude Rosmolen =

Coordinates: 52°38′30.48″N 5°3′22.13″E

Oude Rosmolen
- Interactive map of Oude Rosmolen

Restaurant information
- Established: 1955
- Head chef: Constant Fonk
- Rating: Michelin Guide
- Location: Duinsteeg 1, Hoorn, Netherlands
- Other information: Closed down

De Oude Rosmolen is a defunct restaurant located in Hoorn in the Netherlands. It was a fine dining restaurant that was awarded one Michelin stars in the period 1986-1989 and two Michelin stars is the period 1990–2000.

The head chef was Constant Fonk.

The restaurant was located in a 17th-century building that once contained a bakery with its own mill. The mill was driven by a horse, which gave the building its name "Rosmolen" (translation from Dutch: "Horse mill").

== See also ==
- List of Michelin starred restaurants in the Netherlands
