= Henk Savelberg =

Dutch head chef (born 1953)

Henk Savelberg (Mechelen, 11 July 1953) is a Dutch head chef. Up until now, he is the only head chef from the Netherlands awarded a Michelin star in five different restaurants.

Savelberg comes from a mining family of five children. At a young age he lost his mother, so he was mainly raised by his father and sister. He went to the hotel school in Sittard. He trained, amongst others, in Kasteel Wittem (Wittem) and hotel Terminus (Heerlen).

When he was 17, he enlisted in the Netherlands Marine Corps. During an exercise in Norway he got frozen toes and as a consequence he had to leave the service.

== Kitchen career ==
After leaving the Marines at age 20, he started working in the hospitality industry. His first employers were Bon Ton in Scheveningen, Nostaligia and La Grande Bouffe in The Hague, where he discovered the Nouvelle Cuisine. He then went to France for work experience at Gérard Pangaud in Paris, Jan Pierre Bioux in Lyon and Le Chateau de Luca Lonnais in Brittany.

=== Star 1: De Graaf van het Hoogeveen ===
Back in the Netherlands, he started working at restaurant De Graaf van het Hoogveen. Here he was awarded his first Michelin star, in 1982. The restaurant had a Michelin star in the period 1982-1988.

=== Star 2: Seinpost ===
In 1983, Savelberg left De Graaf van het Hoogveen and moved over to restaurant Seinpost in Scheveningen.

A company named "Tartuffe Holding", comprising Henk Savelberg and a group of friends, set up Restaurant Seinpost in 1983. In 1989, they started Vreugd en Rust and Savelberg moved. As a consequence of Savelberg leaving, Seinpost lost its star.

=== Star 3: Vreugd en Rust ===
After extensive renovations, Savelberg (and "Tartuffe Holding") opened restaurant-hotel Vreugd en Rust in 1989. He was not only head chef, but also part owner (23%) of the restaurant. In 1993, after a conflict with the other shareholders about the role of his wife Ingrid, he sold his share and left the restaurant.

In 1990, Savelberg was awarded a Michelin star here. He retained the star until he left in 1993.

=== Intermezzo at the Golfclub ===
Due to protests from neighbours, the opening of a new restaurant in the villa Zorgvliet in The Hague was severely delayed. To keep busy and to train in his staff, Savelberg started working at Auberge De Vliethoeve, the restaurant of a local golfclub in Rijswijk. In 1995, he gave up on Zorgvliet and moved back to Vreugd en Rust.

=== Star 4: Vreugd & Rust - Savelberg ===
In 1995, Savelberg returned to Vreugd en Rust, now as owner of the restaurant. In 1997, he also bought the building and estate. Michelin awarded him a Michelin star from 1998 to present.

=== Star 5: Savelberg at Yenakart soi 2, Bangkok ===
In 2017 one star was awarded in the first ever to be published Michelin guide for Bangkok.

== Les Patrons Cuiseniers ==
Henk Savelberg was one of the founders of Les Patrons Cuisiniers in 1991. He did this with other well known chefs: Maartje Boudeling, Paul Fagel, Constant Fonk, John Halvemaan, Cees Helder, Toine Hermsen, John Kern and Emmanuel Mertens. Aims of the new organization were enhancing of the culinary level, more attention to the kitchen staff and the strengthening of friendship ties.

== Awards ==
- Order of Orange-Nassau: Knighted in 2003.
- Michelin star: 1982-1984 (Graaf van het Hoogveen), 1985-1989 (Seinpost), 1990-1993 (Vreugd en Rust), 1998-2012 (Savelberg)
- Wine Spectator Grand Award: 1995, 1996, 1997, 1998

== Personal ==
Henk Savelberg was married with Ingrid. Later, he married Diana.

In 2007, Savelberg underwent heart surgery to correct a birth defect. It took him years to recover from that, and even more time to accept that he had to take a step back.

== See also ==
- List of Michelin-starred restaurants in the Netherlands

== Bibliography ==
- 2012: Jongeren koken met Henk Savelberg; Henk Savelberg and Brijder Jeugd
- 2006: Savelberg : restaurant-hotel; Kees Hageman, Jan Lagrouw, Henk Savelberg, Kim MacLean; Inmerc
- 2003: Aspergeschalen 1850-1940 : Collectie Juffermans, Utrecht; Jan Juffermans, with recipes of Henk Savelberg and others; Catalog for the exhibition at the Kunsthal Rotterdam in 2003; V+K
- 1999: Savelberg 2000; Henk Savelberg, John Smarius, et al.
- 1989/1991: De kookkunst van Henk Savelberg : de vier seizoenen van Vreugd en Rust; Henk Savelberg, Rien van der Helm, Hanke Smit-de Berg, et al.; Van Dishoeck
- 1985-1986: Lekker koken, zo doe je dat, 't hele jaar door; Hans Belterman and Henk Savelberg; 4 volumes; Van Dishoeck
