= Helianthushof =

Coordinates: 51°39′2.34″N 5°38′4.66″E

- Interactive map of Helianthushof

Restaurant information
- Head chef: Jannis Brevet
- Food type: French
- Rating: Michelin Guide
- Location: Boekelsedijk 17, Uden, 5404 NK, Netherlands

Helianthushof was a restaurant in Uden, in the Netherlands. It was a fine dining restaurant that was awarded one Michelin star in 1998 and retained that rating until 2001.

Owner and head chef of Helianthushof was Jannis Brevet.

The restaurant lost its star in 2002, due to Brevet selling the restaurant in 2001 to take over Inter Scaldes in Kruiningen.

== See also ==
- List of Michelin starred restaurants in the Netherlands
