= Hoofdplaat =

- Village
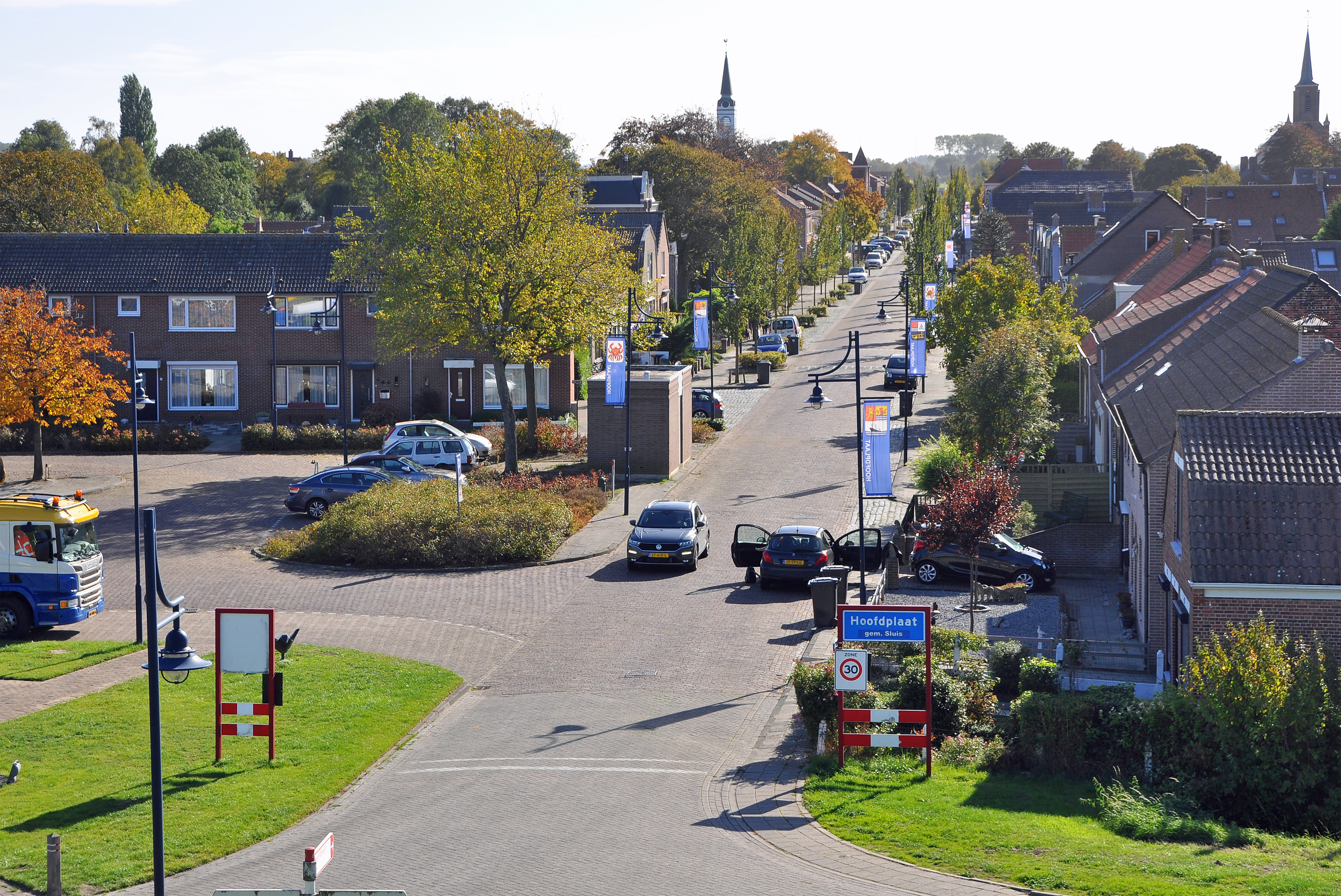
- Hoofdplaat main street

- Coat of arms

- Location in the province of Zeeland in the Netherlands Hoofdplaat (Netherlands)
- Coordinates: 51°22′10″N 3°39′43″E
- Country: Netherlands
- Province: Zeeland
- Municipality: Sluis

Area
  - Total: 13.27 km^{2} (5.12 sq mi)
- Elevation: 1.8 m (5.9 ft)

Population (2021)
  - Total: 630
  - Density: 47/km^{2} (120/sq mi)
- Time zone: UTC+1 (CET)
  - Summer (DST): UTC+2 (CEST)
- Postal code: 4513
- Dialing code: 0117

Hoofdplaat is a village in the Dutch province of Zeeland. It is located on the Westerschelde, about 7 km east of Breskens, in the municipality of Sluis.

== History ==
The village was first mentioned in 1665 as Hooge Plaet, and is named after a sand bank near the village. The area had been inhabited before. The village of Gaternesse was known to exist around 1000. The village was flooded in 1408, and in 1664, the ruins of the church were still visible.

Hoofdplaat is a road intersection village which developed after the Hoofdplaatpolder was poldered between 1775 and 1778. A harbour was built in 1808, but was filled up in 1969 as part of the Delta Works.

The Dutch Reformed church is modest square church with ridge turret which was built between 1783 and 1785. It was damaged during World War II, and restored between 1947 and 1949. The Catholic St Eligius Church was built in 1861 as a replacement of a 1795 church. It was damaged by war both in 1940 and 1944. The church was restored in 1989, but decommissioned in 2012. In 2019, it was converted to an apartment building. The former town hall was built in 1913 with Jugendstil influences and has a little built-in tower.

Hoofdplaat was home to 1,031 people in 1840. On 10 October 1944, Hoofdplaats was liberated by Canadian troops as the first village in West Zeelandic Flanders to be liberated. Hoofdplaat was a separate municipality until 1970. In 2003, it became part of the municipality of Sluis.

== Gallery ==
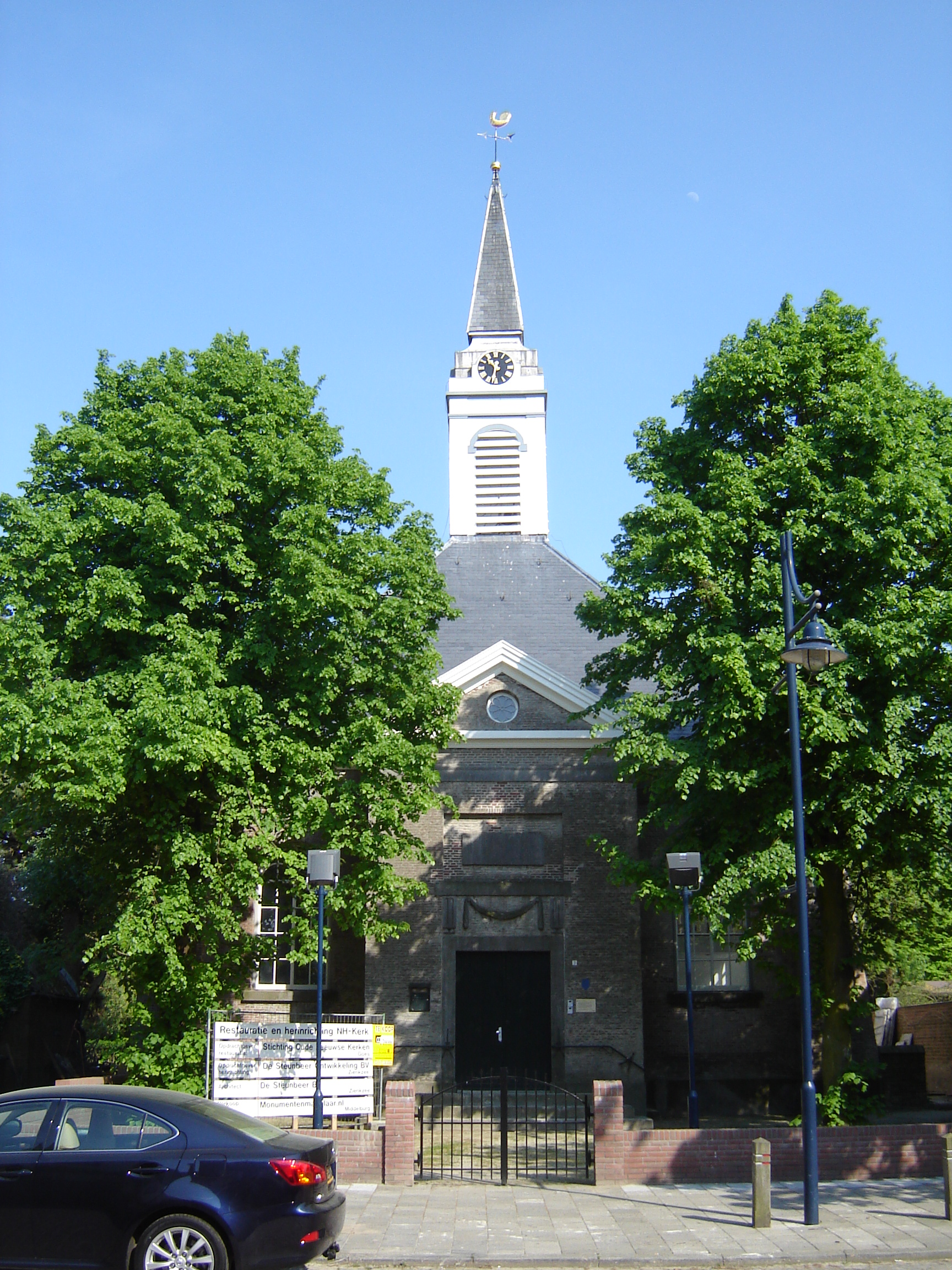
Dutch Reformed church

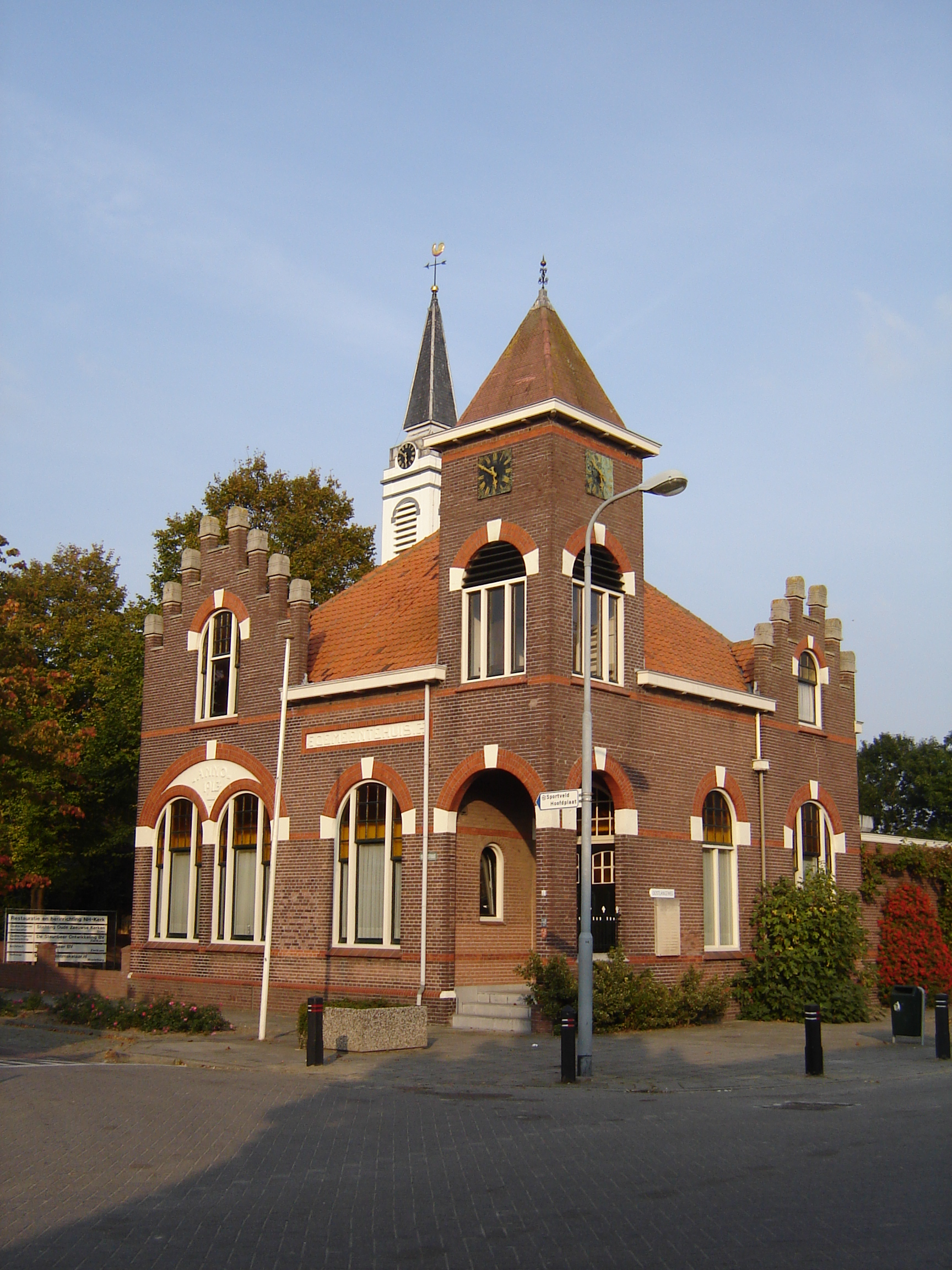
Former town hall

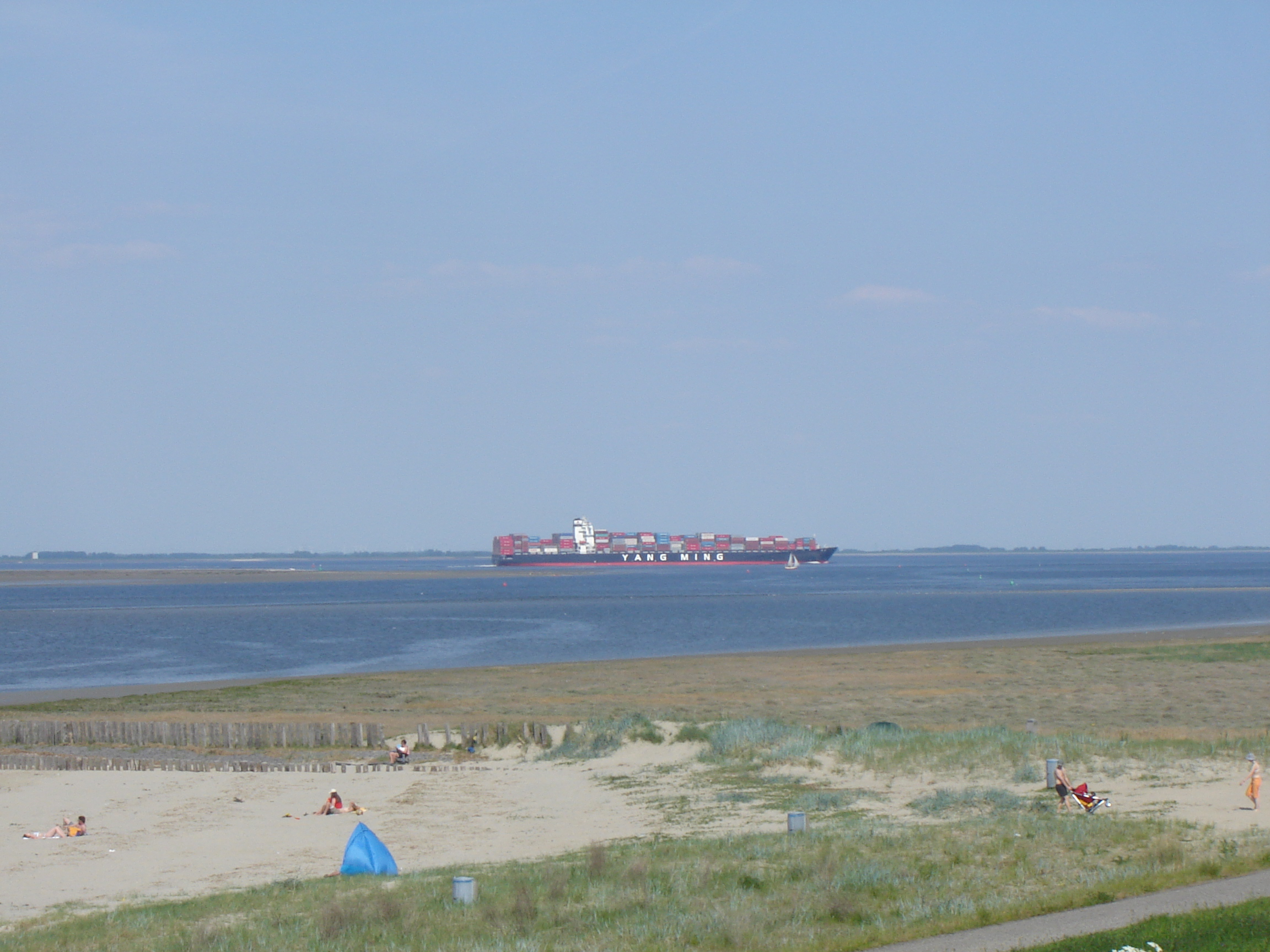
Beach near the Westerschelde

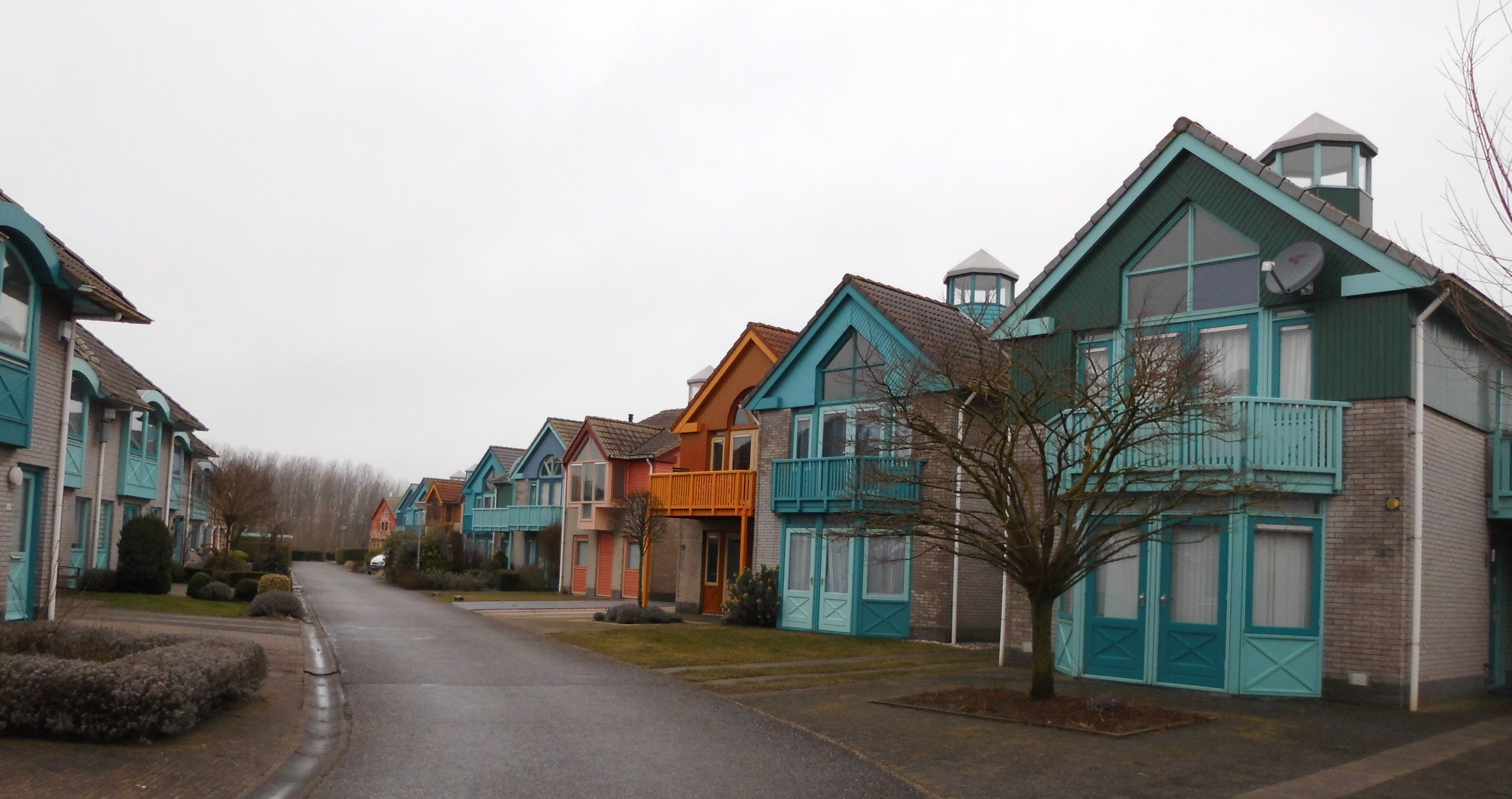
Street in Hoofdplaat
