= Den Hoorn, North Holland =

Den Hoorn
- Village
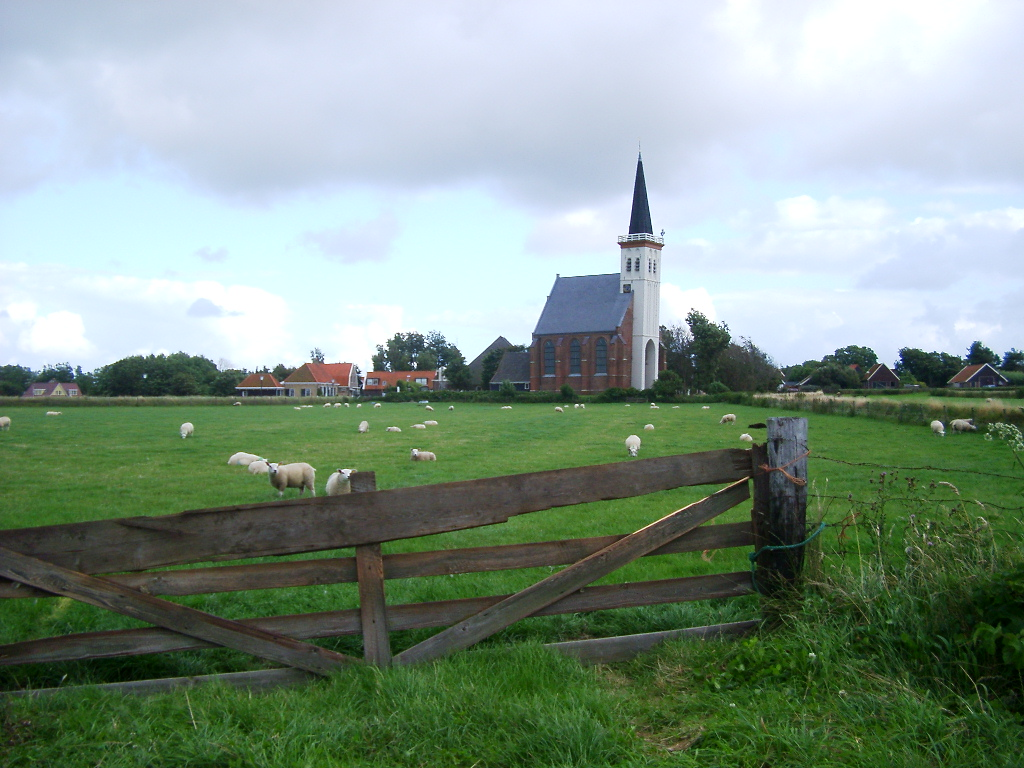
- The church of Den Hoorn

- Location in the Netherlands Location in the province of North Holland in the Netherlands
- Coordinates: 53°1′27.81″N 4°45′4.59″E
- Country: Netherlands
- Province: North Holland
- Municipality: Texel

Area
  - Total: 0.79 km^{2} (0.31 sq mi)
- Elevation: 1.8 m (5.9 ft)

Population (2025)
  - Total: 415
  - Density: 530/km^{2} (1,400/sq mi)
- Time zone: UTC+1 (CET)
  - Summer (DST): UTC+2 (CEST)
- Postal code: 1797
- Dialing code: 0222

Den Hoorn is a village in the Dutch province of North Holland. It is a part of the municipality of Texel, and lies about 9 km north of Den Helder.

== History ==
A prominent feature outside the modern core of the village is the white (Dutch reformed) church, built in the fifteenth century to replace a wooden chapel demolished in 1409. The new church was ready in 1425 and 25 years later received a tower which would later also serve as a beacon. The three signal beacons for shipping were replaced only in 2008 by a modern tri-colour signalling device featuring oscillating green light on one side, an oscillating red light on the other side and a white light in the middle.

Parts of the church were rebuilt in the seventeenth century. The church bells date from the fifteenth century, but during the Second World War, with the country under occupation, the order was received to remove the bells and convey them, along with the bells from more than 200 other Dutch clock towers, to Germany. The bells were duly demounted from the tower and shipped along the coast towards Germany. However, near Urk the ship sank and after the war the bells from Den Hoorn were salvaged and returned to the tower.

The location of the church outside the built up part of the village is striking. In the past Den Hoorn was much larger and the church was surrounded by buildings, but major reductions in shipping transport led to many houses in the village being abandoned and subsequently destroyed, leaving the church looking isolated.

Since 1962 boats to Texel have docked at 't Horntje, very close to Den Hoorn which is near the southern tip of the island. Den Hoorn is also home to two national institutes. These are the Royal Dutch Institute for Maritime Research (Nederlands Instituut voor Zeeonderzoek / NIOZ) and a short distance away Alterra, previously and more instructively known as the Institute for Woodland and Rural Environment Research (het Instituut voor Bos- en Natuuronderzoek / IBAN)

== Gallery ==
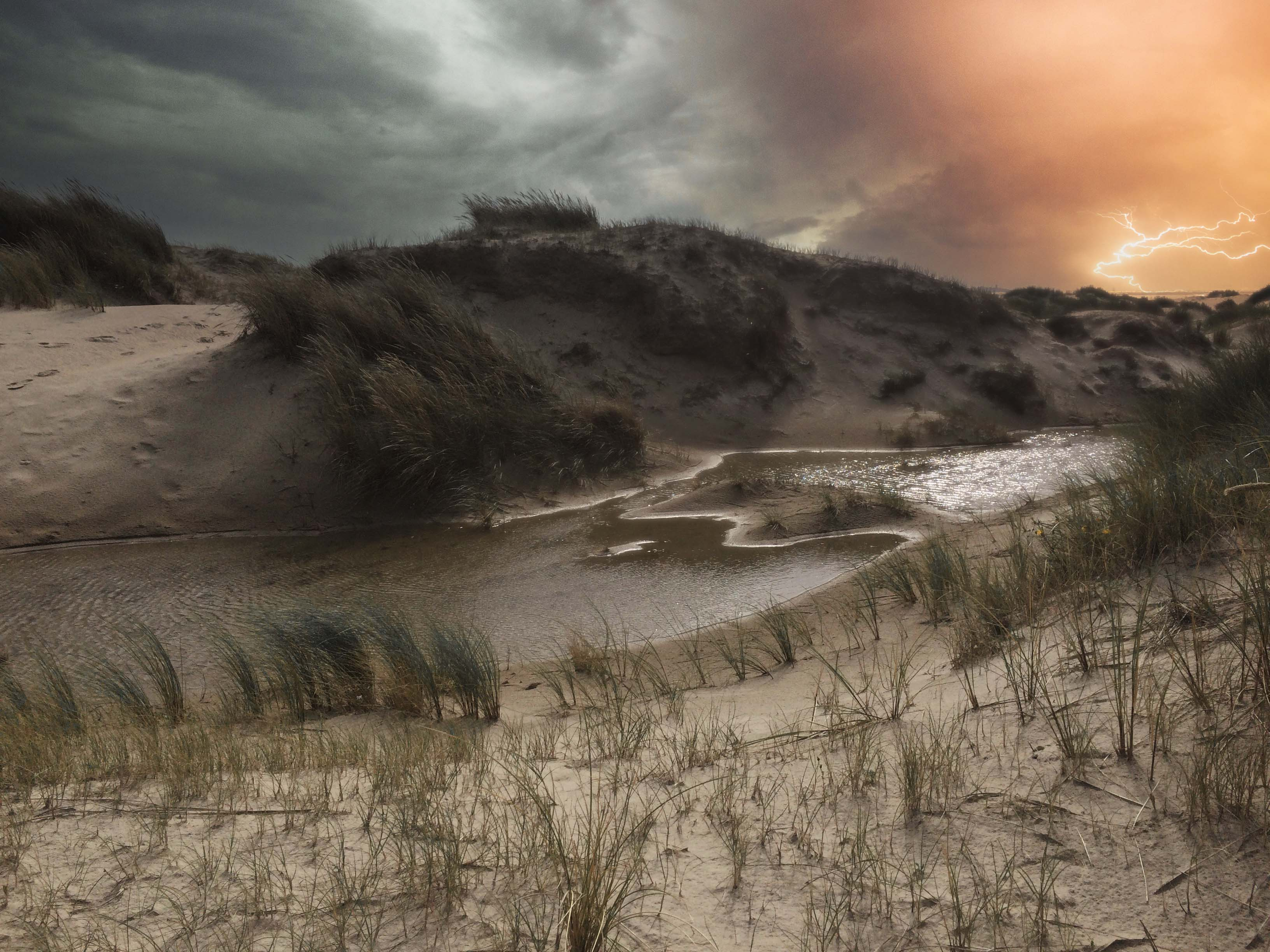
Den Hoorn, Dunes of Texel National Park

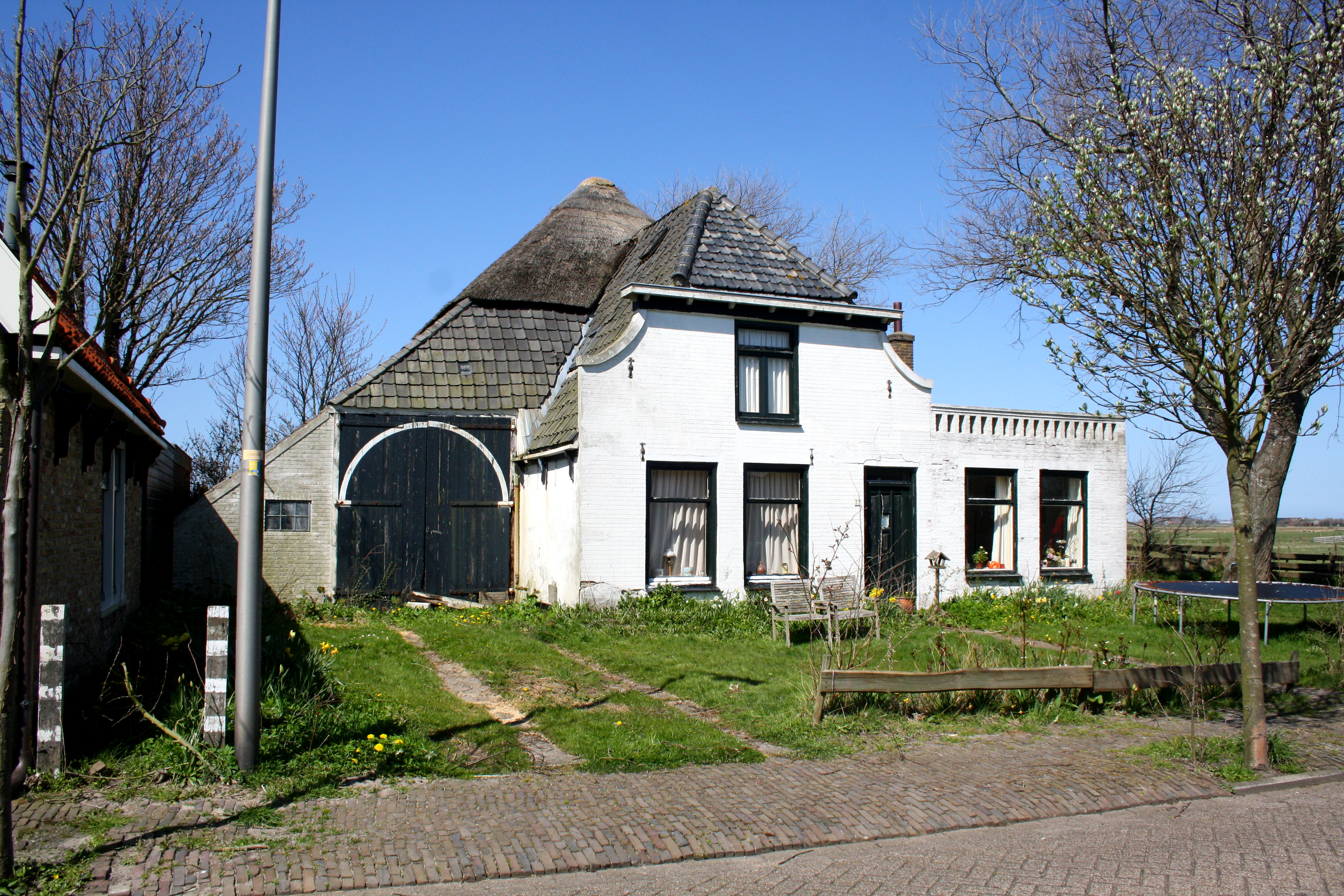
Farm in Den Hoorn

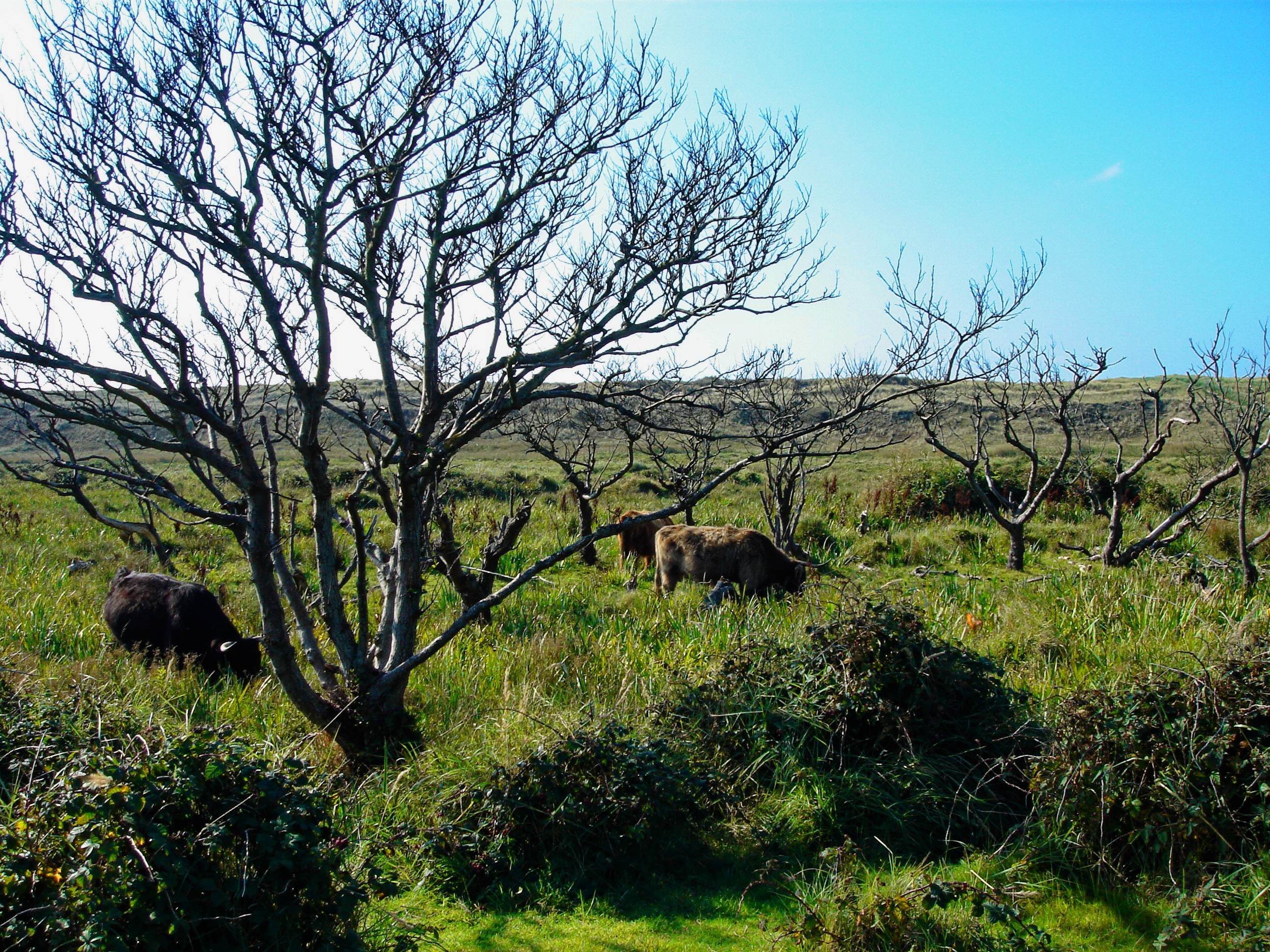
Countryside

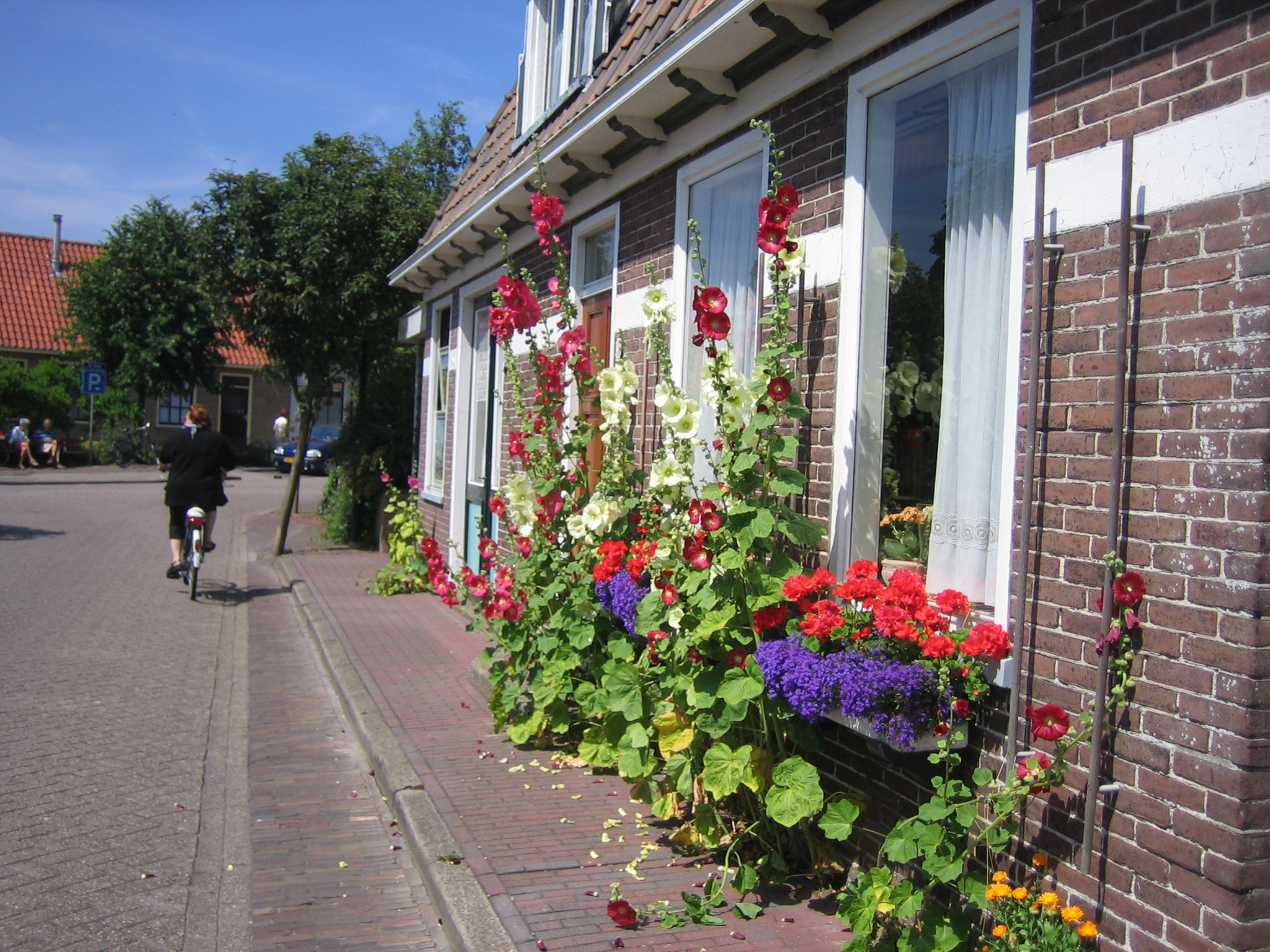
Street view
