= Parkheuvel =

Coordinates: 51°54′13.69″N 4°28′17.92″E

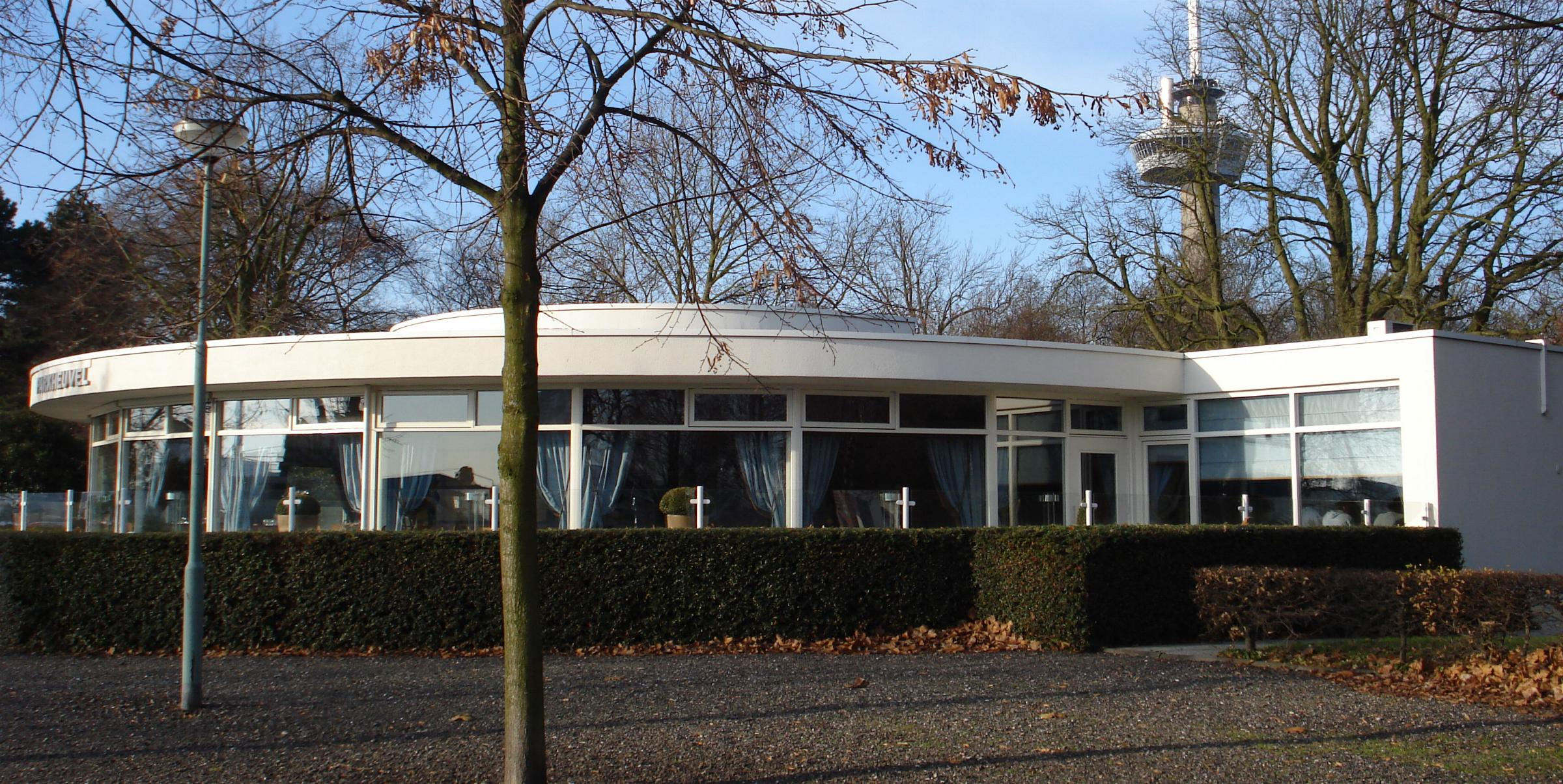
- Restaurant Parkheuvel
- Interactive map of Parkheuvel

Restaurant information
- Established: 1986
- Food type: French
- Rating: Michelin Guide
- Location: Rotterdam, Netherlands
- Seating capacity: 70
- Website: http://www.parkheuvel.nl

Parkheuvel is a restaurant in Rotterdam, Netherlands. It is a fine dining restaurant that has been awarded one or more Michelin stars from 1990 to present. At its top it had three Michelin stars. GaultMillau awarded the restaurant 18.0 points (out of 20 points).

The restaurant is located at Heuvellaan 21 in Rotterdam, in a semicircular modern pavilion with a view over the Nieuwe Maas and Rotterdam Harbour. The pavilion is decorated in art deco style.

Parkheuvel was in 2002 the first restaurant in the Netherlands to be awarded three Michelin stars. The kitchen staff was at that time led by head chef Cees Helder. In 2006 Erik van Loo, formerly of two-starred restaurant De Zwethheul, took over but lost two stars in the process. In 2009 he had proved that he was worthy to be awarded a second star.

== Star history ==
1990-1994: one star
1995-2001: two stars
2002-2006: three stars
2007-2008: one star
2009–present: two stars
