= Cees Helder =

Dutch chef

Cees Helder (born 1948 in Starnmeer, North Holland) is a Dutch chef, former restaurant owner of Parkheuvel in Rotterdam. He was the first chief cook in the Netherlands to acquire three Michelin stars.

Helder obtained his first Michelin star when he was chief cook at Villa Rozenrust. A second star followed with Le Chevalier in Delft. In 1986, Helder purchased Parkheuvel and in November 2001 it became the first Dutch restaurant to hold three Michelin stars. Helder's culinary style is simple, but very sophisticated, and he is known for his grilled turbot dish. In 2006, Helder sold Parkheuvel to Erik van Loo. In the winter of 2012-3 he was chief cook of the Palazzo Amsterdam.
