= Margo Reuten =

Dutch head chef (born 1966)

- Born: 23 December 1965 (age 60); Maasbracht
- Occupations: owner and head chef Da Vinci (1993-present) sous chef Der Bloasbalg (1992-1993) sous chef Toine Hermsen (1990-1992) chef de partie De Swaen (1987-1990) apprentice chef Prinses Juliana (1983-1987)
- Employer: self-employed
- Known for: Michelin starred Da Vinci
- Spouse: Petro Kools

Margo Reuten (Maasbracht, 23 December 1965) is a Dutch head chef, known for her cooking in the Michelin starred restaurant Da Vinci. From 2009 till 2018, she was the only female head chef in the Netherlands holding two Michelin stars.

Reuten describes her cooking style as "classic French" and "loyal to the region". For her classic dishes she uses as much as possible locally sourced ingredients.

== Career ==
Restaurant Da Vinci was opened in 1993. It carries one Michelin star since 1999 and two from 2009 till 2018.

Before Reuten opened restaurant Da Vinci, she had already a lot of experience on high culinary level. She worked as sous chef in restaurant Der Bloasbalg, at that moment bestowed with a Michelin star. Other restaurants where she worked and trained were Toine Hermsen (sous chef), De Swaen (chef de partie) and Prinses Juliana (apprentice chef).

== Personal life ==
Reuten was raised in Maasbracht and is married to Petro Kools.

== Awards ==
- SVH Meesterkok (Master chef): 1990
- Michelin star Da Vinci: 1 star, 1999-2008, 2018–present; 2 stars: 2009-2018
- Freeman of Maasgouw: 2009
- GaultMillau Chef of the Year: 2012
- Relais & Chateaux Grand Chef: 2012

== Published books ==
Together with Petro Kools:

- 2003: Proeven van Bekwaamheid (Eng.: Tasting Ability)
- 2010: Proeven van Bekwaamheid Special Edition (Eng.: Tasting Ability Special Edition)
