= Toine Hermsen =

Toine Hermsen may refer to:

- Toine Hermsen (chef), Michelin starred chef, owner of the restaurant with his name
- Toine Hermsen (restaurant), Dutch restaurant with one Michelin star (formerly two)
