= Prinses Juliana =

Coordinates: 50°52′6.3″N 5°49′42.05″E

- Interactive map of Prinses Juliana

Restaurant information
- Established: c. 1958
- Closed: 2007
- Food type: Fine dining
- Rating: Michelin Guide
- Location: Broekhem 11, Valkenburg aan de Geul, Netherlands

Prinses Juliana is a defunct restaurant located in Valkenburg aan de Geul in the Netherlands. It was a fine dining restaurant that was awarded one or two Michelin stars in the period 1958–2006.

The last head chef was Andy Brauers.

The importance of the restaurant is found not only in the food that it produced, but also in the chefs that it trained. Many Michelin starred chefs started their career or did part of their training here. Young chefs that worked at Prinses Juliana include Cas Spijkers, Margo Reuten, Nico Boreas, Michel Lambermon, Erik van Loo and Jeroen Granneman.

== Star history ==
- 1958-1959: one star
- 1960-1979: two stars
- 1980: one star
- 1981-1988: two stars
- 1989-1991: one star
- 1992-1996: two stars
- 1997-2006: one star

== Head chefs ==
- 1958-1980: Cees Preyde
- 1980-1990: Toine Hermsen
- 1990-2003: Otto Nijenhuis
- 2003-2006: Andy Brauers

== After the stars ==
The Stevens family sold the restaurant in 2006, after being the owner for 92 years. A renovation followed and the restaurant reopened as restaurant "J". Unfortunately it was bankrupt after seven months and had to close down. "Prinses Juliana" reopened in 2008 as a hotel-restaurant-hospital in collaboration with the Academic Hospital Maastricht.

== See also ==
- List of Michelin starred restaurants in the Netherlands
