= Der Bloasbalg =

Coordinates: 50°48′42.75″N 5°56′22.35″E

- Interactive map of Der Bloasbalg

Restaurant information
- Established: 1966
- Closed: 2006
- Chef: Jan Waghemans
- Food type: French
- Rating: Michelin Guide
- Location: Botterweck 3, Wahlwiller, 6286 DA, Netherlands

Restaurant Der Bloasbalg was a restaurant in Wahlwiller, in the Netherlands. It was a fine dining restaurant that was awarded one Michelin star in 1985 and retained that rating until 2005.

From the beginning till 2005, when he sold the restaurant, Jan Waghemans was the head chef.

Der Bloasbalg was a member of the Alliance Gastronomique Néerlandaise.

The restaurant closed down in 2006 and was replaced by restaurant "Les Arômes".

== History ==
In 1966, Jan and Ellie Waghemans started Camping Valencia. Part of the camping was a small canteen, where they sold snacks and drinks to their guests. In 1976, they closed the camping and started a small restaurant. The beginning was difficult, but with Jan Waghemans growing experience (originally he was a housepainter), the food quality and the number of guests was also growing. They were awarded a Michelin star in 1985.

== See also ==
- List of Michelin starred restaurants in the Netherlands
