= Lemiers =

Lemiers Lemieësj
- Village
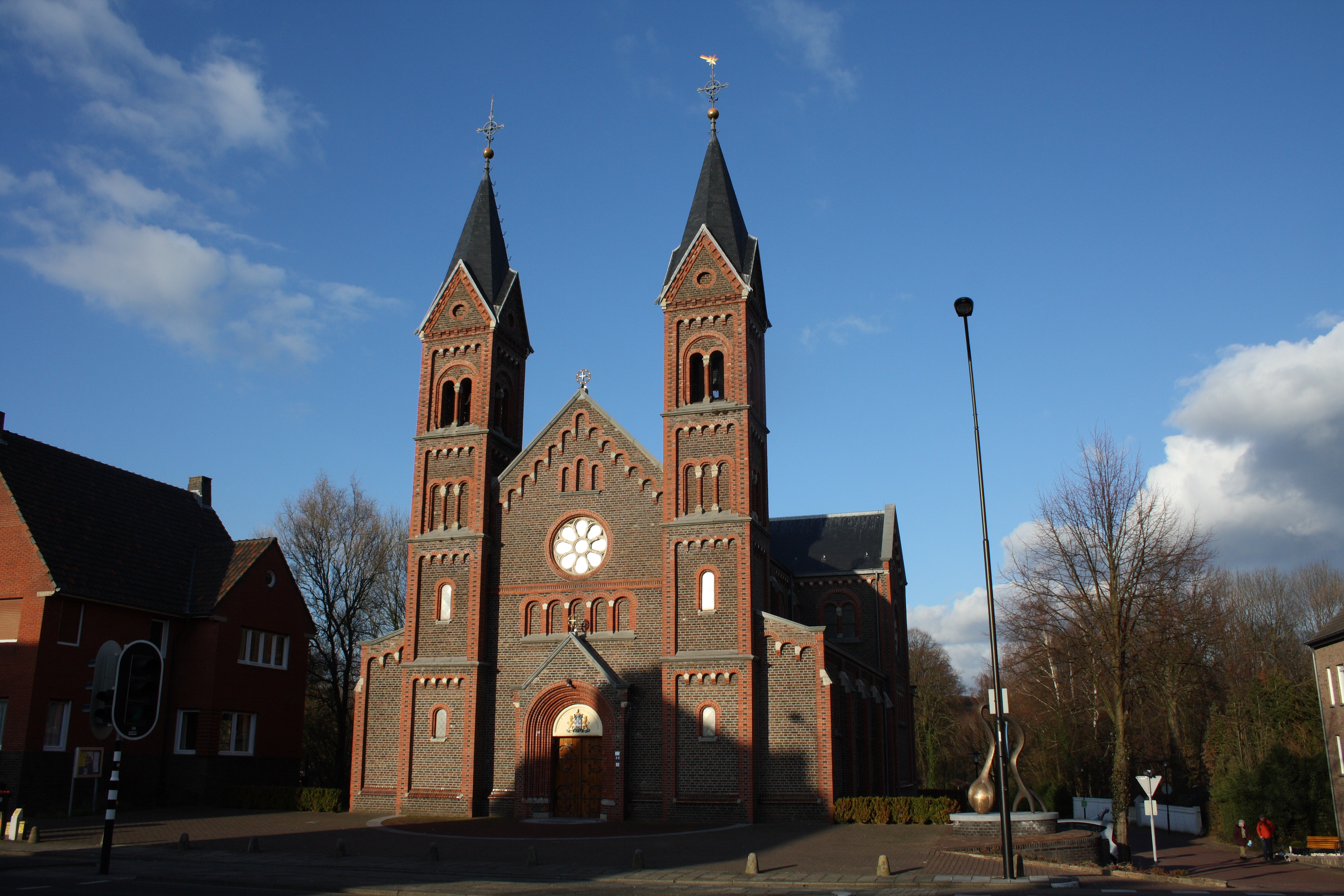
- Church of Lemiers

- Location in the Netherlands Location in the province of Limburg in the Netherlands
- Coordinates: 50°47′N 5°59′E
- Country: Netherlands
- Province: Limburg
- Municipality: Vaals

Area
  - Total: 1.62 km^{2} (0.63 sq mi)
- Elevation: 157 m (515 ft)

Population (2021)
  - Total: 690
  - Density: 430/km^{2} (1,100/sq mi)
- Time zone: UTC+1 (CET)
  - Summer (DST): UTC+2 (CEST)
- Postal code: 6295
- Dialing code: 043

Lemiers (Dutch: [ləˈmiːrs]; Ripuarian: Lemieësj [ləˈmiə̯ʃ]) is a village in the Dutch province of Limburg. It lies directly north-west of Vaals.

The village sits on the Dutch-German border and part of the settlement is on German territory. The largest, Dutch part belongs to the municipality of Vaals. The smaller German part of town, separated by a small stream, is part of the adjoining German city of Aachen.

The current day center of the village stretches along both sides of the N278 from Maastricht to Vaals. The historic center of the village, closer to the Selzerbeek stream, is now known as Oud-Lemiers (Old-Lemiers). There's evidence of early settlements at this location. Excavations in the 1920s and 1930s uncovered remains of a large Roman villa.

The village of Lemiers has some 690 inhabitants in total. Notable monuments include the 12th century Sint-Catharina chapel and the 15th century Lemiers castle.

== Gallery ==
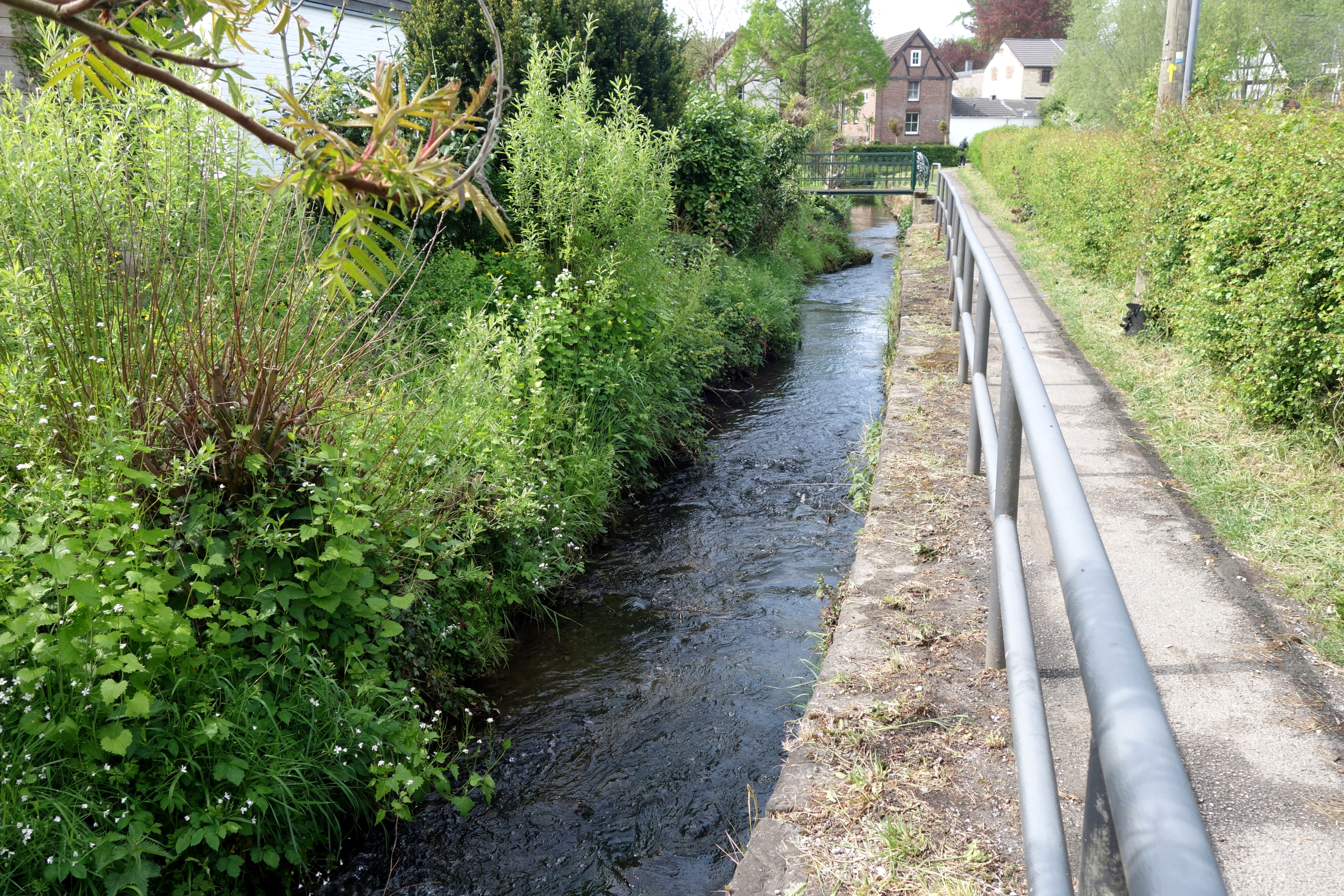
Bridge over the Selzerbeek stream in Lemiers

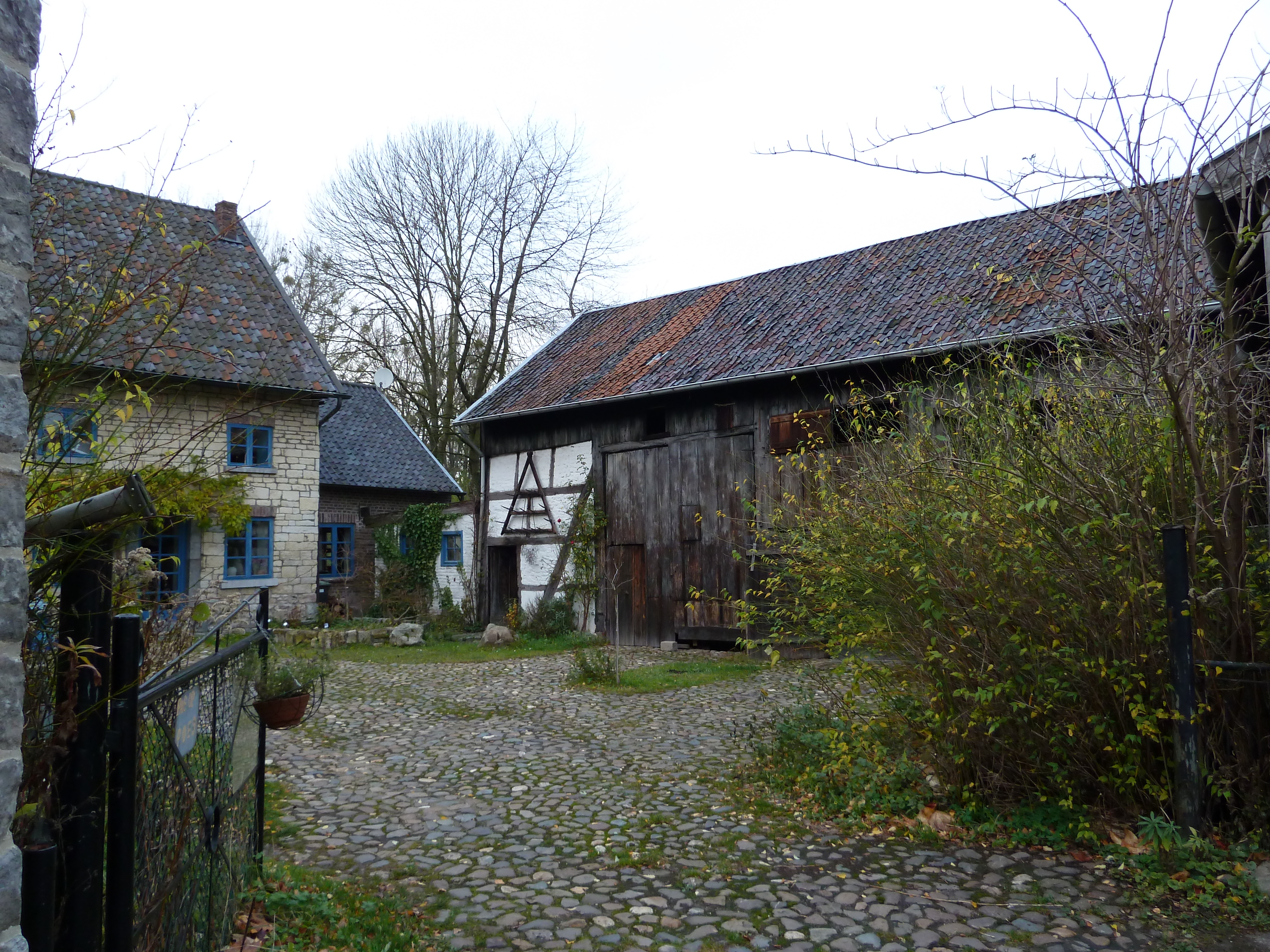
Farm in Lemiers

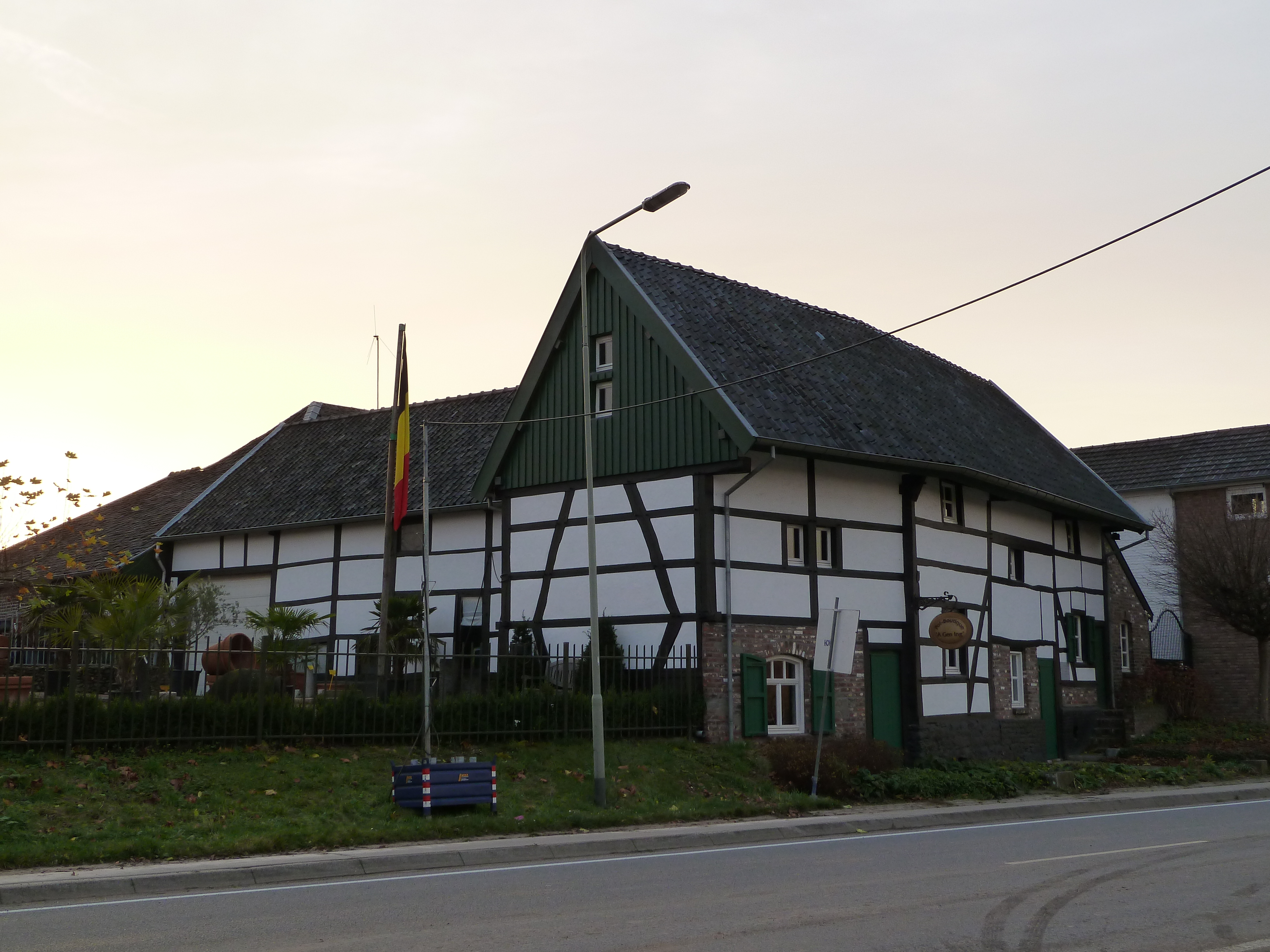
Farm in Lemiers

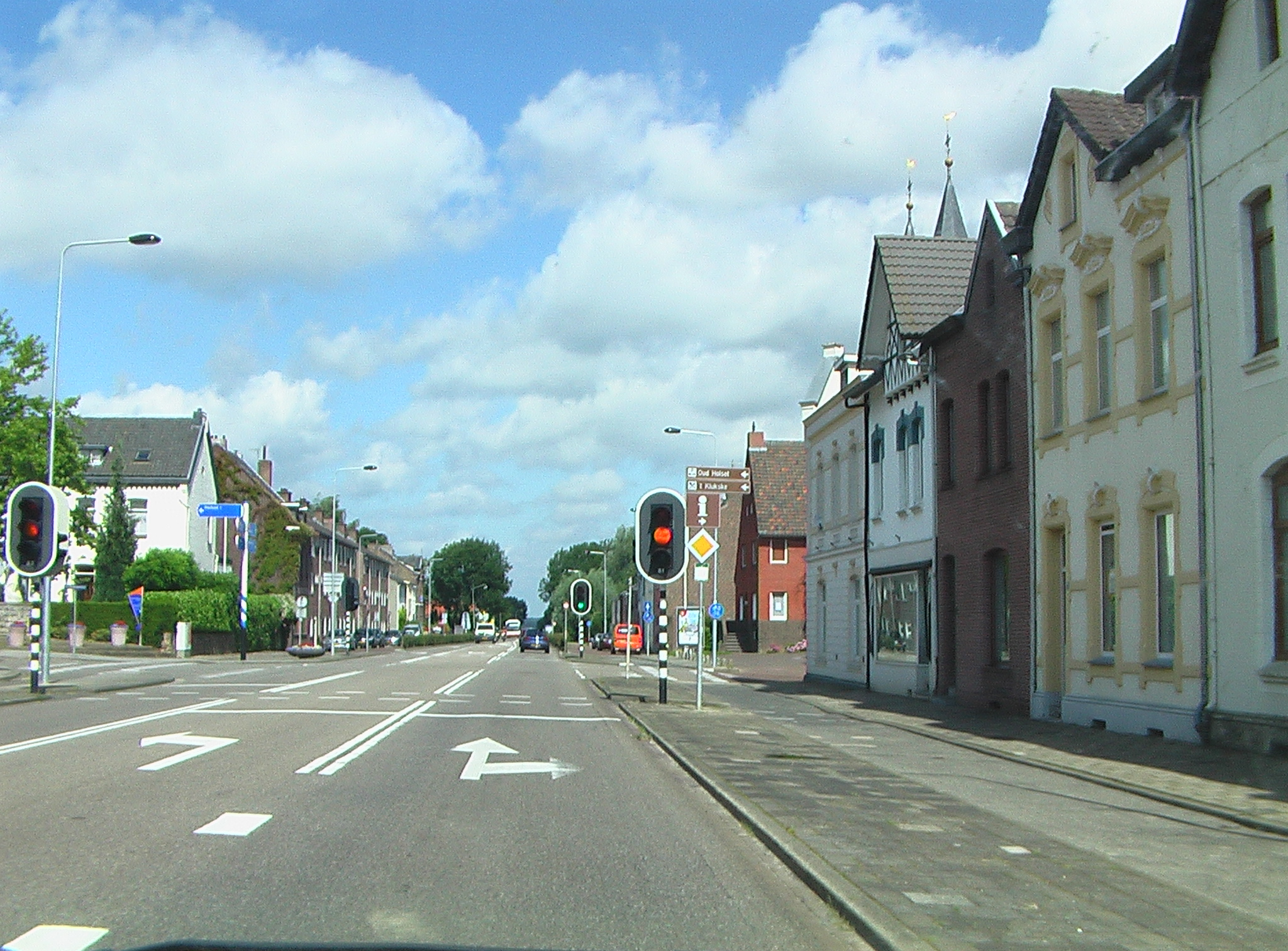
Street view

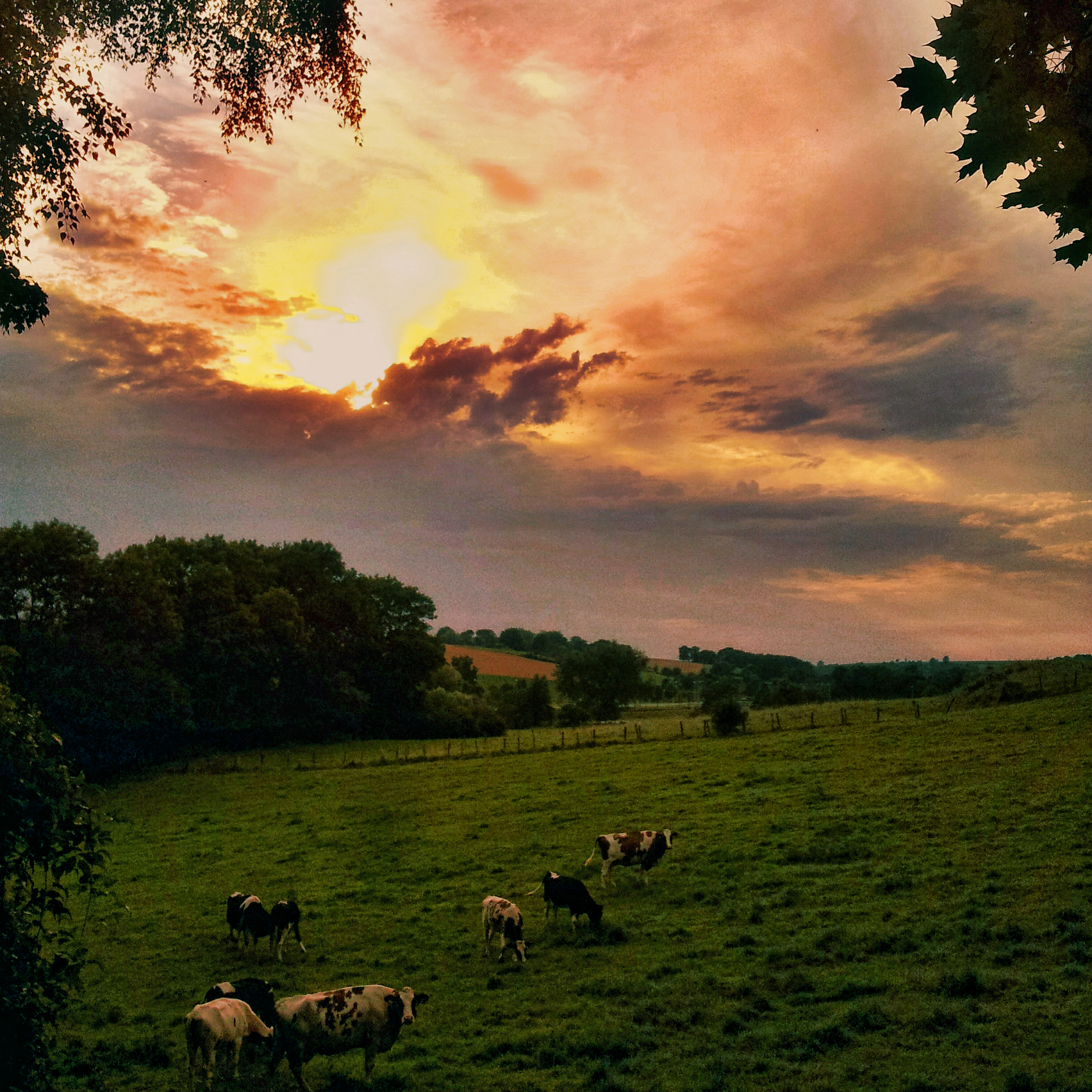
Landscape near Lemiers
