= De Swaen =

Coordinates: 51°34′51.82″N 5°11′50.47″E

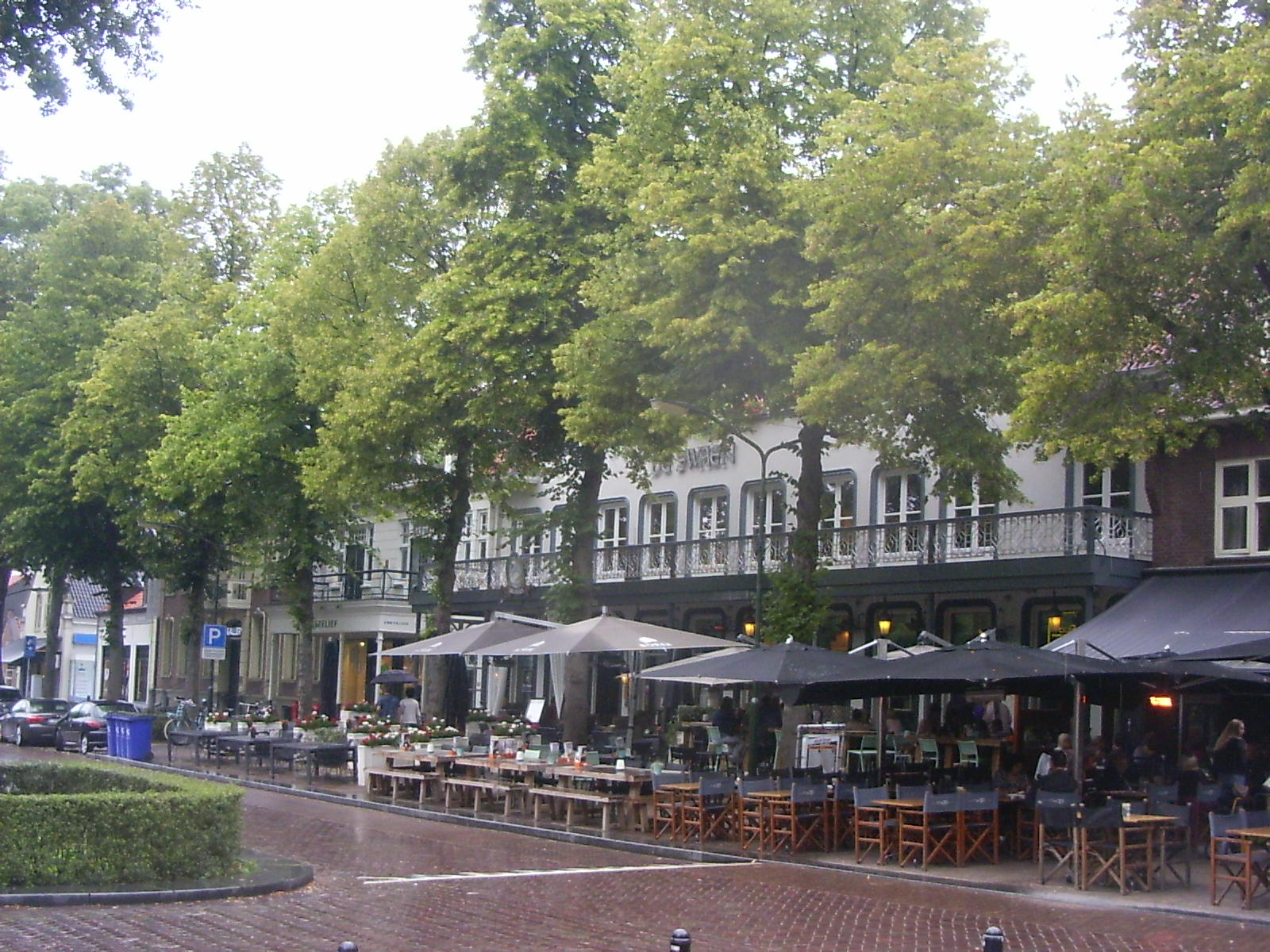
- Interactive map of De Swaen

Restaurant information
- Food type: French
- Rating: Michelin Guide
- Location: De Lind 47, Oisterwijk, 5061 HT, Netherlands
- Seating capacity: 60
- Other information: Restaurant closed down in 2004, reopened as brasserie in 2006
- Website: http://swaen.nl/

De Swaen is a defunct restaurant in Oisterwijk, Netherlands. The fine dining restaurant was awarded one or two Michelin stars each year in the period 1981–1998. In the period 1984-1991 it was awarded 2 Michelin stars. The restaurant was awarded one star in the periods 1981-1983 and 2002–2003.

== Overview ==
Hotel De Swaen opened in 1978 after a major renovation. Owner Henk Aan de Stegge decided to give the exploitation in the hands of John van Dun and his head chef Cas Spijkers. Soon Spijkers was joined by chef Piet Rutten. In 1980 Van Dun left and Piet Rutten was promoted to director and front of house manager while Spijkers headed the kitchen.

After Spijkers stepped back as head chef, the restaurant lost his star. In 2001 Alan Pearson took over the role as head chef and he managed to win the star back. It was not enough to save the restaurant and it closed in 2004. In 2006 De Swaen reopened as "Brasserie De Swaen".

== Controversy ==
In 2005, author Ronald Giphart published the book Troost. Giphart claimed that Cas Spijkers and De Swaen were his models for this book. Cas Spijkers was very surprised to hear that he was responsible for the demise of De Swaen, because he left there a few years before they lost their stars.

== Star overview ==
- 1981-1983: one star
- 1984-1991: two stars
- 1992-1998: one star
- 1999-2002: no stars
- 2003-2004: one star

== See also ==
- List of Michelin starred restaurants in the Netherlands
