= Selzerbeek =

River in Germany and the Netherlands

Selzerbeek Senserbach
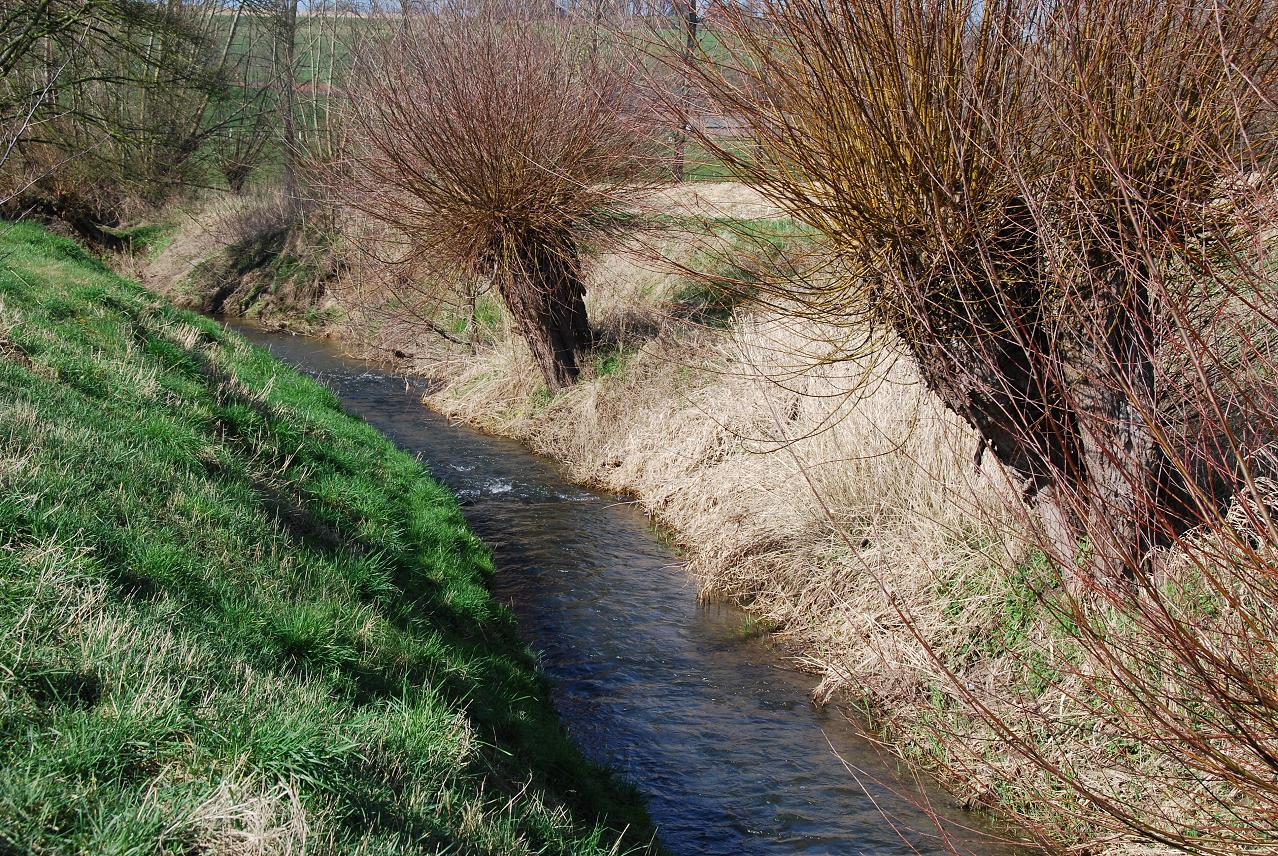

Location
- Countries: Germany; Netherlands

Physical characteristics
- Source
  - location: near Aachen
- Mouth
  - location: Geul near Wittem
  - coordinates: 50°48′34″N 5°54′43″E
- Length: 13 km (8.1 mi)

Basin features
- Progression: Geul→ Meuse→ North Sea

Selzerbeek (or Senserbach, Sinselbeek, Sinselbaach, Selzerbaek) is a river of North Rhine-Westphalia, Germany and Limburg in the Netherlands. It stretches over approximately 13 kilometres (8 mi) from its source at Aachen to its mouth near Gulpen into the Geul.

== Geography ==
The Selzerbeek originates in Germany below the tripoint Germany-Belgium-Netherlands at Vaalserberg and flows through Vaalserquartier.

From Vaals through Lemiers to Mamelis the Selzerbeek forms the natural border between the Netherlands and Germany. In this area, it flows to other small streams: the Orsbacher Puetz, the Zieversbach at Holset, the Herman Bach Lemiers and Harleserbach at Harles.

Behind Mamelis flows Selzerbeek by the Netherlands, parallel to Provincial route 278 along the villages Nijswiller, Wahlwiller and Partij until it empties into the Geul (a direct tributary of the Meuse) near Wittem.

The Selzerbeek runs for 7.2 kilometres (4.5 mi) in Germany or on the border, and for 6.2 km (3.9 mi) solely in the Netherlands.

== Environment and water quality ==
After investigations by the MUNLV NRW in Selzerbeek's exposure to pesticides, metals and other pollutants low or below the detection limit (2008)

== Sites and monuments ==
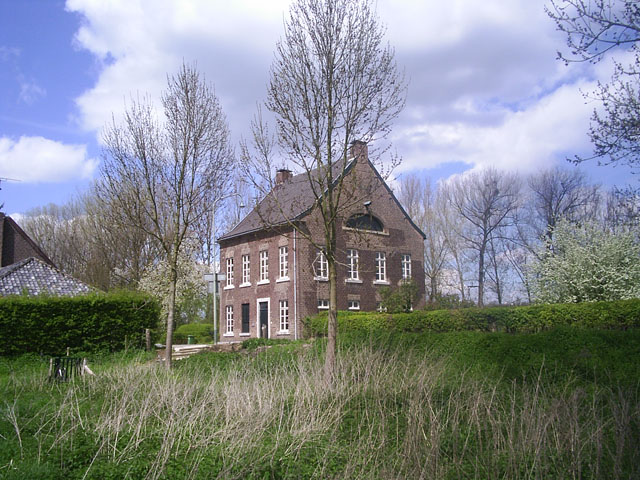
Wittemermolen at Selzerbeek in Wittem

At the Selzerbeek are several water mills: The Lemierser mill in the Mamelis Schoeërmolen, as well as in Wittem the mill of the monastery and the Wittemermolen.
