= Nijswiller =

Nijswiller Nieswieler
- Village
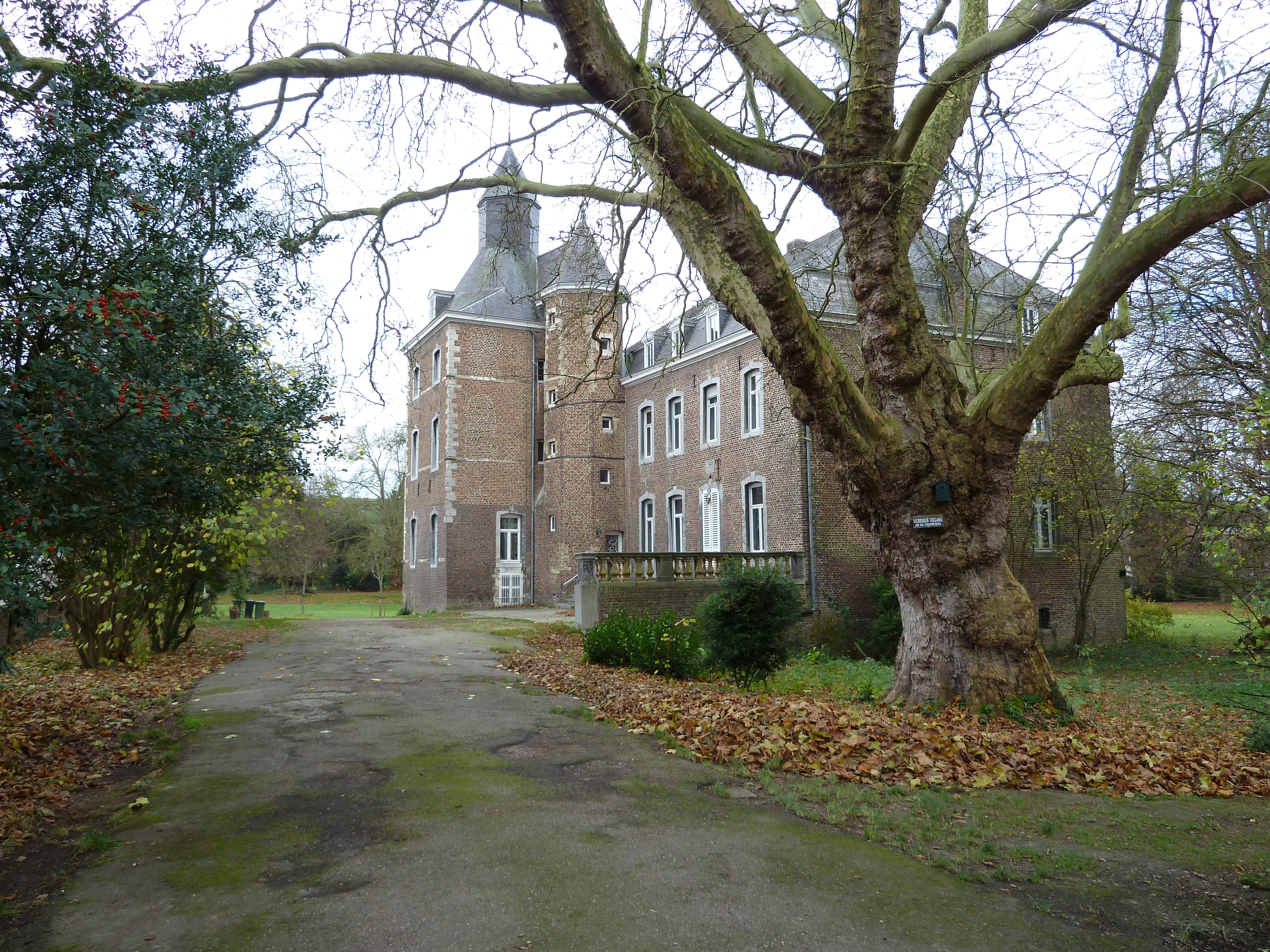
- Nijswiller Castle

- Location in the Netherlands Location in the province of Limburg in the Netherlands
- Coordinates: 50.8060°N 5.9588°E
- Country: Netherlands
- Province: Limburg
- Municipality: Gulpen-Wittem

Area
  - Total: 0.61 km^{2} (0.24 sq mi)
- Elevation: 93 m (305 ft)

Population (2021)
  - Total: 725
  - Density: 1,200/km^{2} (3,100/sq mi)
- Time zone: UTC+1 (CET)
  - Summer (DST): UTC+2 (CEST)
- Postal code: 6286
- Dialing code: 043

Nijswiller (Limburgish: Nieswieler) is a village in the southern part of the Dutch province of Limburg. It is a part of the municipality of Gulpen-Wittem, and is located about 19 kilometres (12 mi) east of Maastricht.

== History ==
The village was first mentioned in 1179 as "de Wilra sancti Dionisii". The current name means "farm of Nijs". Nijs is short for Saint Denis of Paris, the patron saint of the village. Nijswiller developed in the Middle Ages along the old road from Maastricht to Aachen at the crossing with the Selzerbeek.

In 1288, the Peace of Nijswiller was signed between John I of Brabant and Reginald I of Guelders after the Battle of Worringen which was the concluding part of the War of the Limburg Succession. In 1648, Nijswiller was a free heerlijkheid which did not belong to Duchy of Jülich, the Austrian Netherlands or the Dutch Republic. In 1794, it was conquered by France, and became part of the United Kingdom of the Netherlands in 1814.

Nijswiller Castle was first recorded in 1275. There is a two metre thick irregular wall in the oldest part of the castle which is probably a remnant of the original tower. In 1678, the van Schaesberg family were forced to sell the castle, and the building started to deteriorate. In 1703, it was restored, and in 1860, it was significantly extended. Between 1934 and 1980, the castle was used by the Sisters of St. Francis of Heythuysen. In 2008, it became private property.

The Catholic St Dionysius Church is a single aisled church with a little ridge turret. The nave dates from the 12th century up to the windows. Between 1895 and 1896, the church was redesigned by Pierre Cuypers. The ridge turret and windows probably date from a 1905 restoration. The church used to be place of pilgrimage for German Catholics.

== Notable people ==
- Ralf Vandebergh (born 1976), astronomer, photographer and satellite spotter

== Gallery ==
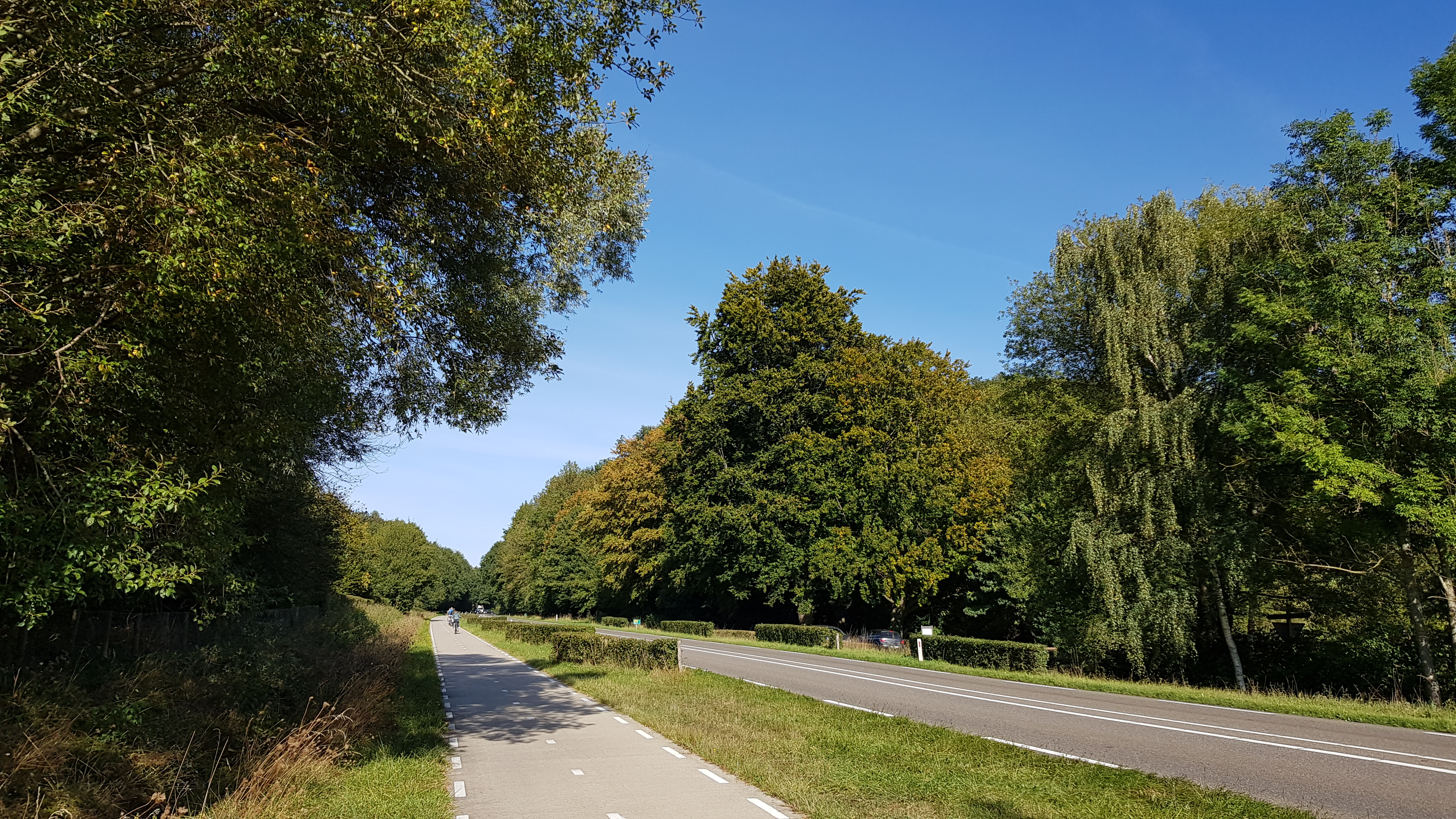
Forest near Nijswiller

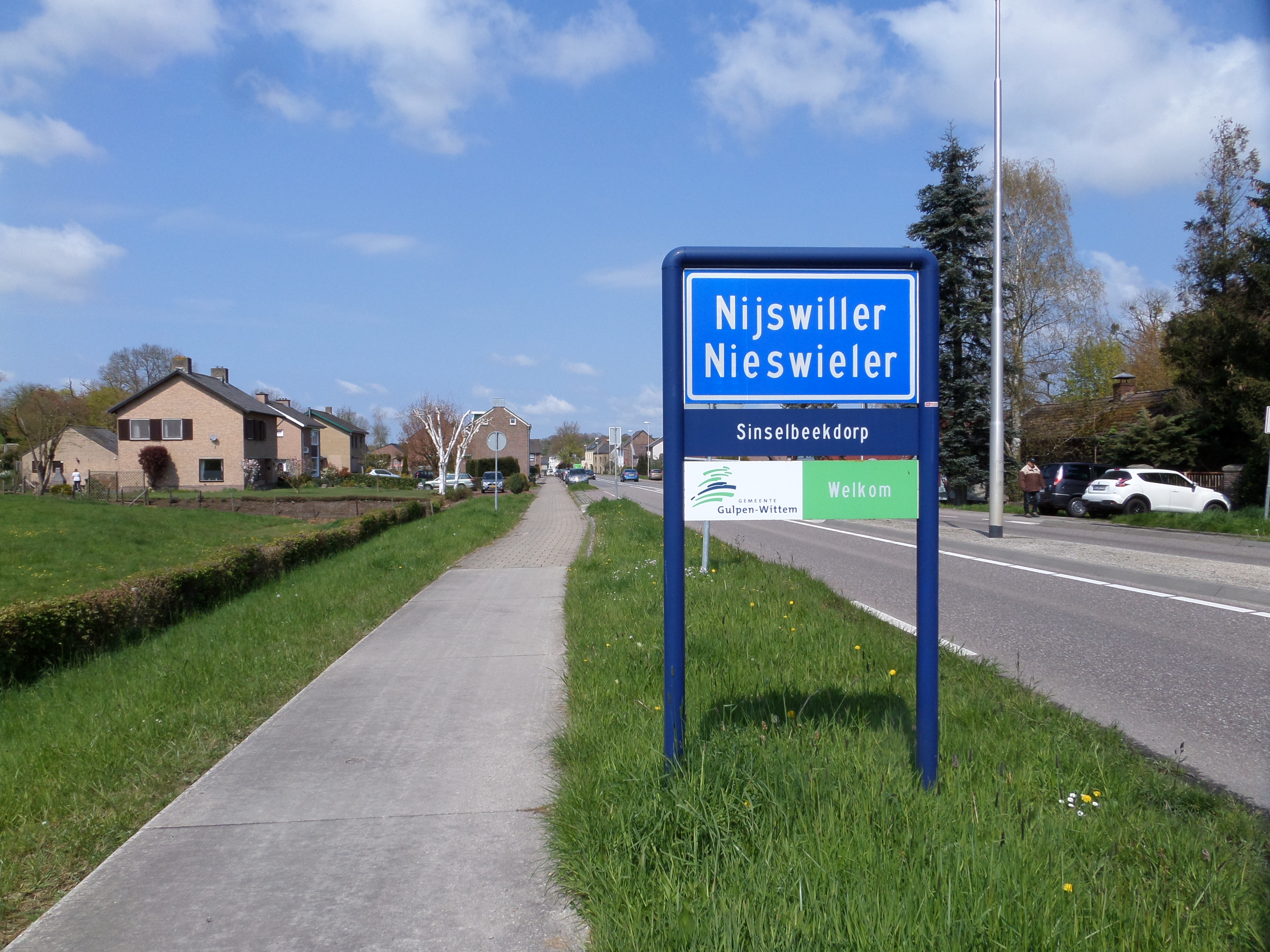
Welcome to Nijswiller

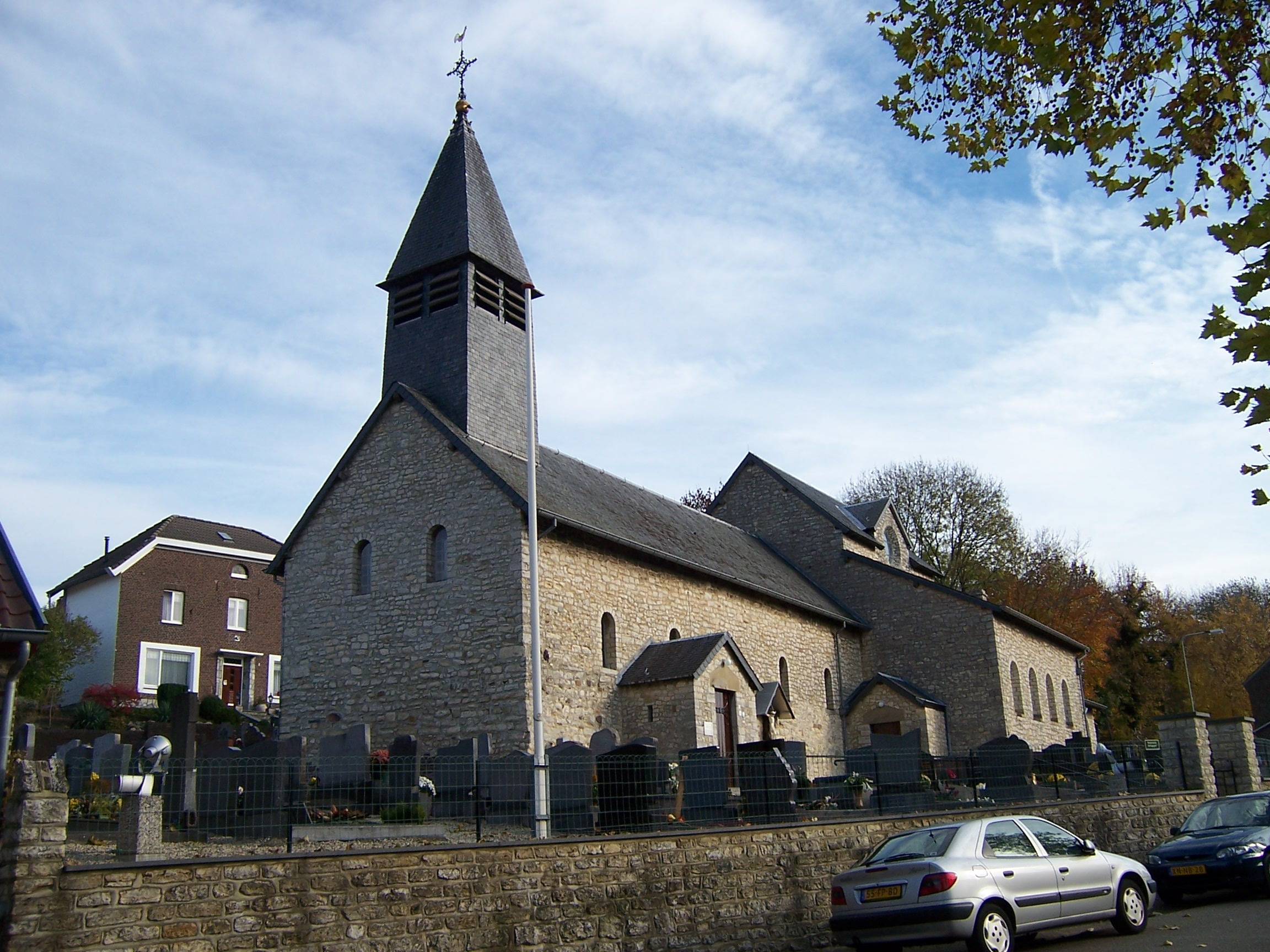
St Dionysius Church

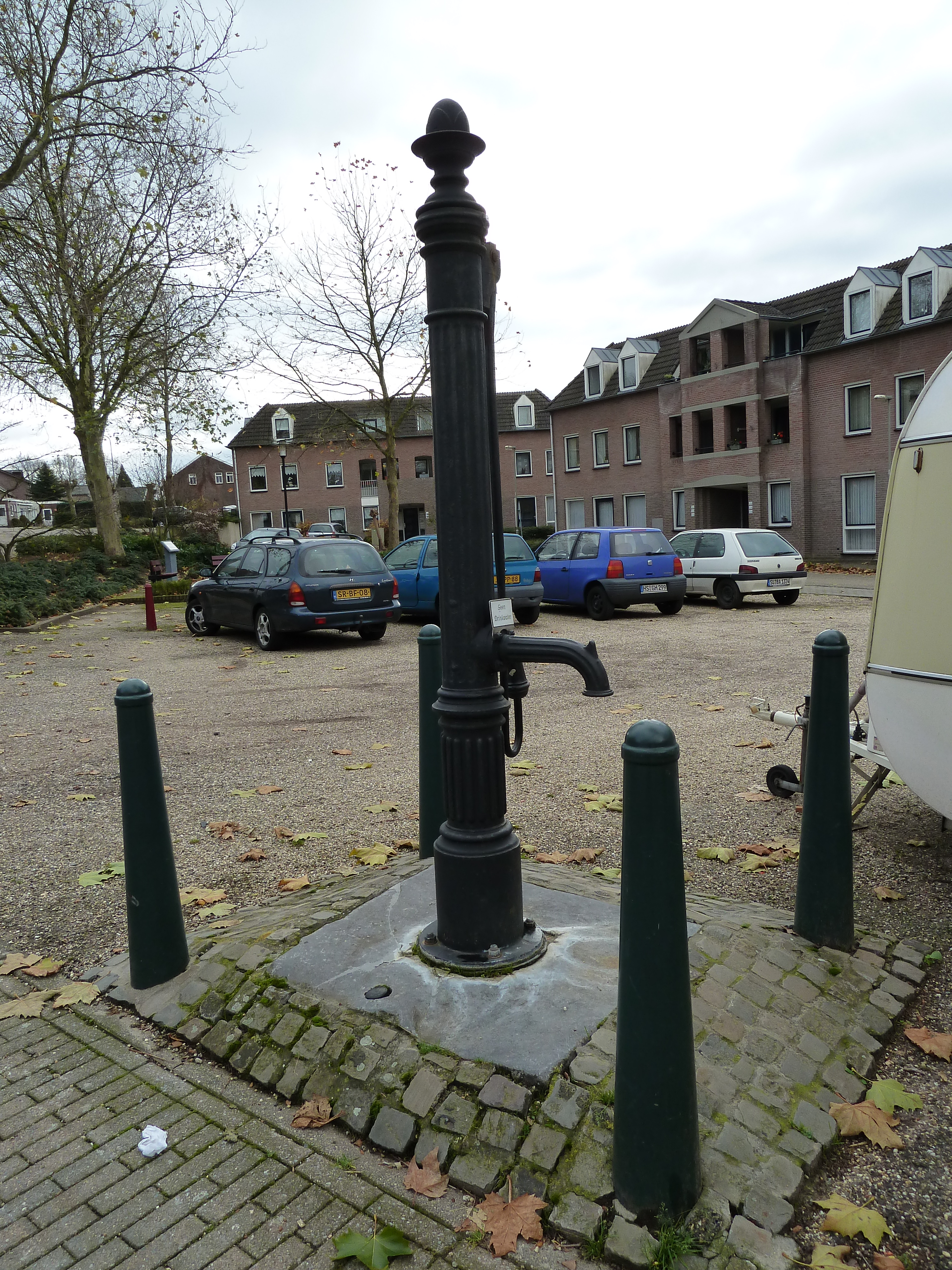
Water pump
