= Da Vinci (restaurant) =

Coordinates: 51°8′39.79″N 5°53′2.93″E

- Interactive map of Da Vinci

Restaurant information
- Established: 1993
- Head chef: Margo Reuten
- Food type: French / International
- Rating: Guide Michelin
- Location: Havenstraat 27, Maasbracht, 6051 CS, Netherlands
- Seating capacity: 60
- Website: http://www.restaurantdavinci.nl/

Da Vinci is a restaurant in Maasbracht in the Netherlands. It is a fine dining restaurant that is awarded one Michelin star for the period 1999-2008 and again from 2018 to present. From 2008 till 2018 it was awarded with two stars. GaultMillau awarded the restaurant 17.0 points (out of 20).

The restaurant is a member of Alliance Gastronomique Néerlandaise, a Dutch/Belgian culinary association of quality restaurants and the Confrérie de la Chaîne des Rôtisseurs.

== See also ==
- List of Michelin starred restaurants in the Netherlands
