= Ralf Vandebergh =

Dutch astronomer and photographer

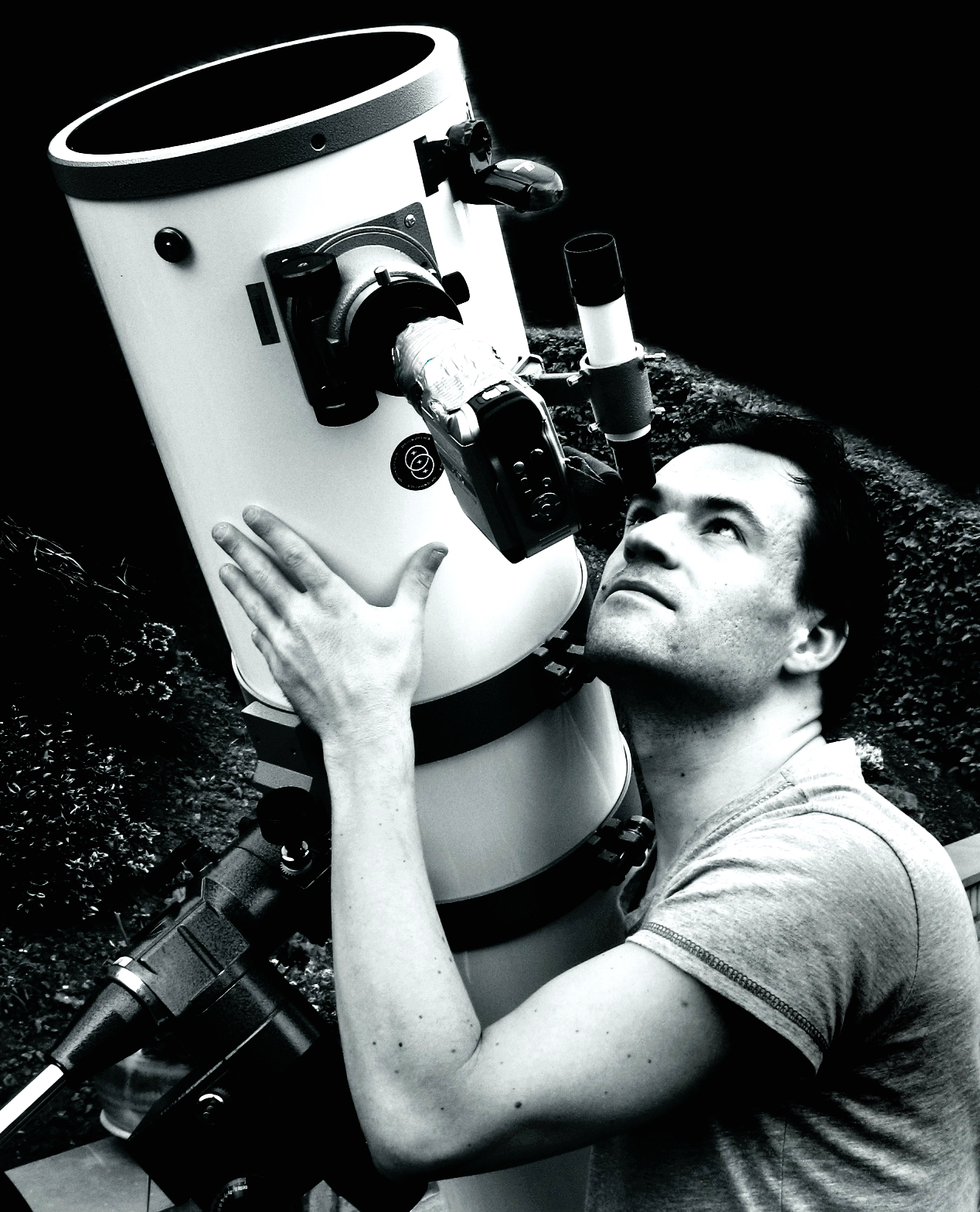
Portrait of Vandebergh

Ralf Vandebergh (born 1976) is a Dutch astronomer, professional photographer and veteran satellite spotter from Nijswiller. He is known for photographing the Sun, Moon, planets, satellites, NASA Space Shuttles, and the International Space Station from Earth using a telescope-mounted camera.

== Biography ==
His work is widely published in the media.

On 10 April 2009, NASA featured one of his images as its "Astronomy Picture of the Day". An October 2011 image he took of the 2.6-short-ton (2.4 t) defunct German telescope ROSAT was published by various media outlets, including the Washington Post, The New York Times, and Fox News. In 2011, Vandebergh captured images of the Russian interplanetary probe Fobos-Grunt, which became stuck in low Earth orbit after communications failure.

== Photographs ==
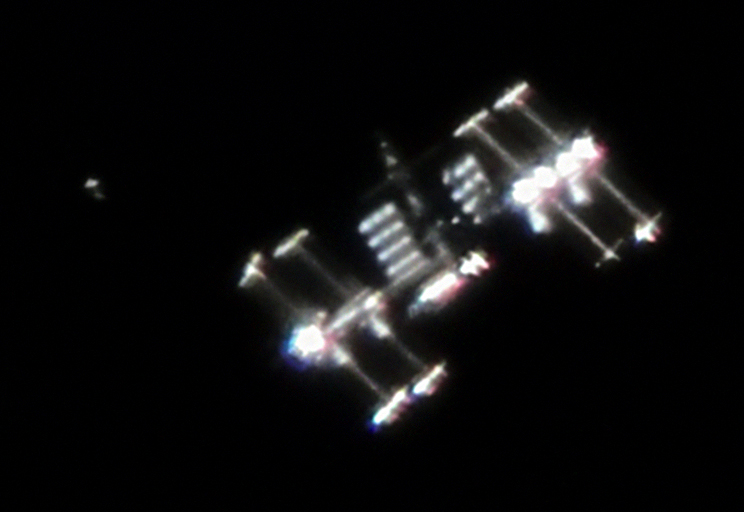
The International Space Station photographed by Vandebergh: "The image shows not only the ISS with very special lighting angle but also it shows activity around the ISS which is often the case. You see the Japanese Cargo Ship HTV-1 in its demonstration flight shortly before docking and just a few hundred meters below the ISS."

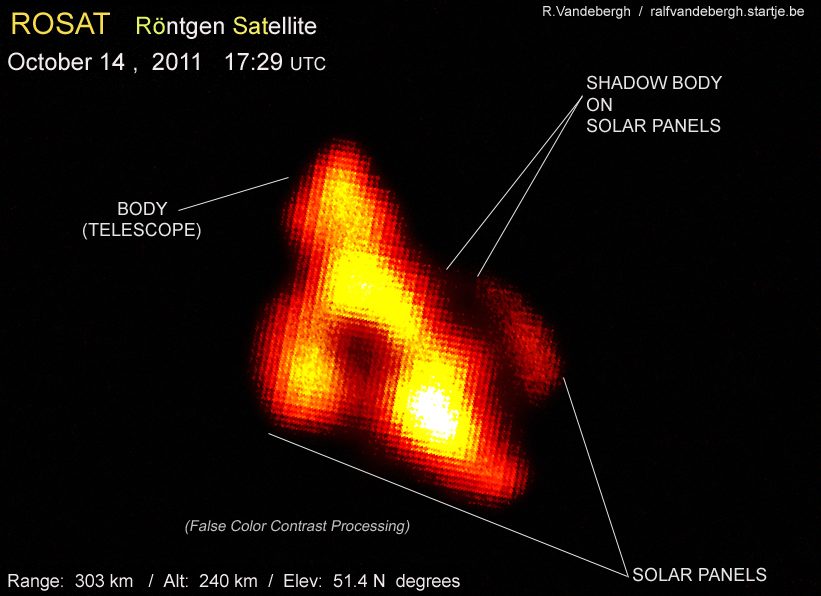
One of the last images of the ROSAT spacecraft before reentry.
