= Alan Pearson =

New Zealand visual artist (1929–2019)

Alan Robert Pearson (23 August 1929 – 2019) was a neo-expressionist painter who lived in New Zealand and, in his later life, Australia.

== Life and work ==
Pearson was born on 23 August 1929 in Liverpool, England, and moved to Australia in 1951 and then New Zealand in 1954. He studied at the University of Canterbury School of Fine Arts from 1957 to 1959, graduating with a Diploma of Fine Arts in 1960, and then lived most of his life in Christchurch, before moving to Australia in 2000. Pearson became a naturalised New Zealand citizen in 1979.

Throughout his career, Pearson exhibited in public and private art galleries across New Zealand and Australia, including a retrospective, Heaven and Blood, at Christchurch Art Gallery in 1999. His work is held in private and public collections and he has been the subject of several publications.

Pearson is known for his expressive and gestural paintings that encapsulate a passionate demeanour and love of music, landscape and people. Pearson painted portraits of many of his friends, family and colleagues. He also chronicled and immortalised himself in numerous self portraits, scrutinising the artist's psyche. In describing his relationship with his sitters, Pearson said in an interview in 2010:

"I'm looking into the inner person, talking with the individual and discovering a collection of inner thoughts which come together in their face."

Pearson died in Noosa, Queensland, Australia, in 2019.

== Awards ==
- 1958 - Rosa Sawtell Prize for drawing
- 1959 - Bickerton-Widdowson Scholarship
- 1964 - Queen Elizabeth II Arts Council of New Zealand scholarship to study at Royal Academy Schools, London.
- 1976 - Queen Elizabeth II Arts Council of New Zealand travel scholarship
- 1978 - National Bank Portrait Award. 1st prize for Herne Bay Couple
- 1979 - National Bank Portrait Award. 1st prize for Portrait of Mrs Oliver
- 1986 - Artist in residence, Otago Polytechnic School of Fine Art, Dunedin Public Art Gallery.
- 1989 - Queen Elizabeth II Arts Council of New Zealand travel grant to Australia.
- 1993 - Artist in residence Tai Poutini Polytechnic, Greymouth (grant, Queen Elizabeth II Arts Council of New Zealand)

== Collections ==
- Aigantighe Art Gallery, Timaru
- Alexander Turnbull Library, Wellington
- Auckland City Art Gallery
- Chartwell Collection, Auckland
- Christchurch Art Gallery (formerly Robert McDougall Art Gallery) Christchurch
- Dunedin Public Art Gallery
- Forrester Gallery, Oamaru
- Hocken Collections, University of Otago Library, Dunedin
- James Wallace Trust
- Middlesbrough Institute of Modern Art, Cleveland, England
- Museum of New Zealand Te Papa Tongarewa, Wellington
- New Zealand Film Archive
- New Zealand Portrait Gallery, Wellington
- Suter Art Gallery, Nelson
- Te Manawa Museum (formerly Manawatu Art Gallery), Palmerston North
- The Rutherford Trust Collection, Wellington
- The Todd Corporation Art Collection, Wellington
- University of Otago Medical School, Auckland
- University of Otago, Dunedin
- Waikato Museum of Art and History, Hamilton
