= Wahlwiller =

- Village
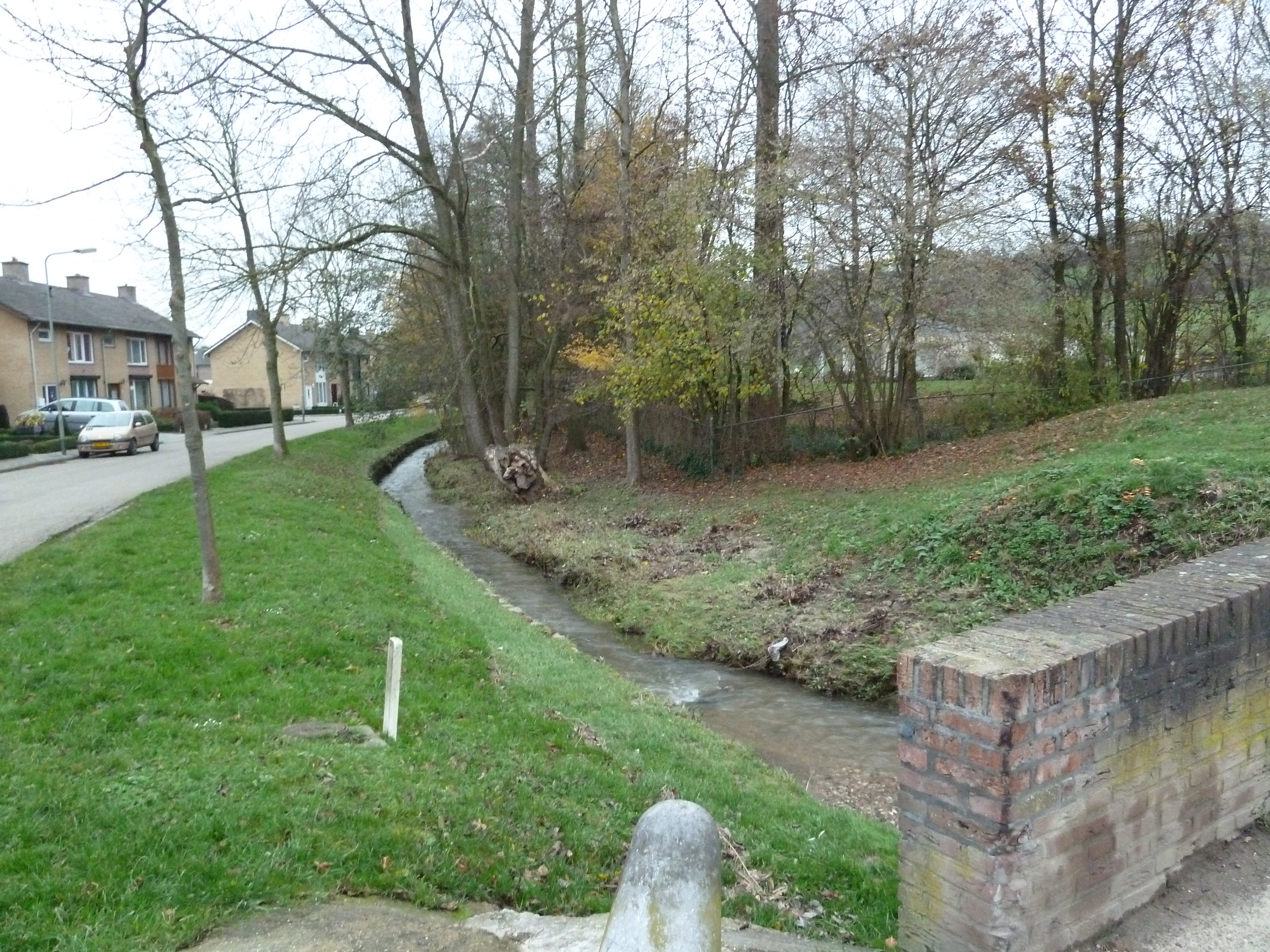

- Location in the Netherlands Location in the province of Limburg in the Netherlands
- Coordinates: 50°48′42″N 5°56′13″E
- Country: Netherlands
- Province: Limburg
- Municipality: Gulpen-Wittem

Area
  - Total: 0.41 km^{2} (0.16 sq mi)
- Elevation: 93 m (305 ft)

Population (2021)
  - Total: 390
  - Density: 950/km^{2} (2,500/sq mi)
- Time zone: UTC+1 (CET)
  - Summer (DST): UTC+2 (CEST)
- Postal code: 6286
- Dialing code: 043

Wahlwiller (Limburgish: Wilder [ˈwɪldəʀ]) is a village in the Dutch province of Limburg. It is located in the municipality of Gulpen-Wittem. The village is located south of the Selzerbeek.

The name of the village is derived from villare, what means "belonging to a villa". In the 14th century the village is mentioned under names as Waelwilre, Wailwilre and Walwilre. The prefix "wael" indicates that the inhabitants were speaking a Walloon language.

Wahlwiller is a road village which developed in the Middle Ages on the road from Maastricht to Aachen. It became an independent parish in 1835. The Catholic St Cunibertus Church is a single-aisled church with a small tower. The church up to the windows dates from the 12th century. It has been enlarged and renovated several times.

On the northern side of the village lies the Kruisberg, of Amstel Gold Race fame.

== Gallery ==
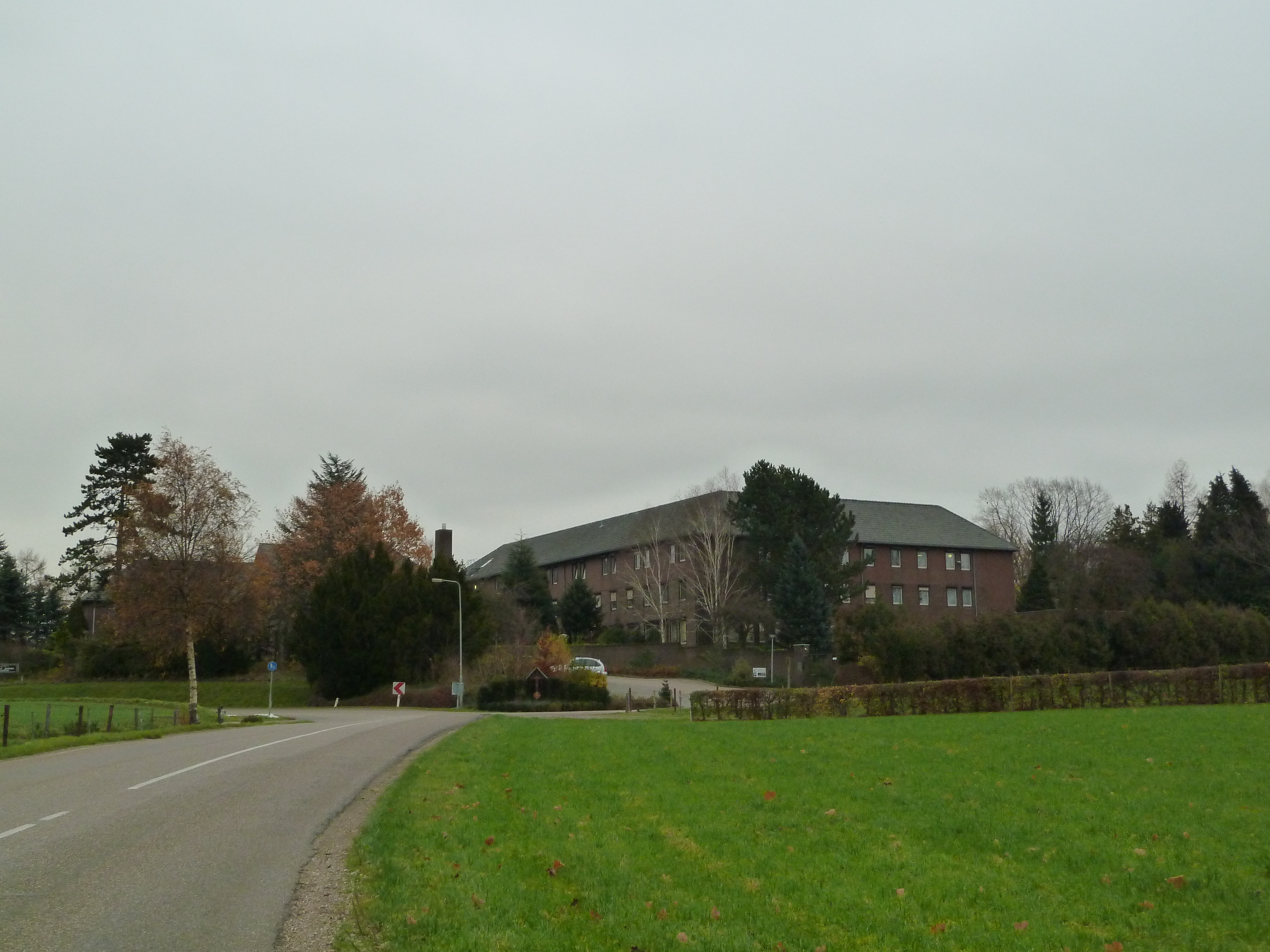
Arnold Janssen Monastery

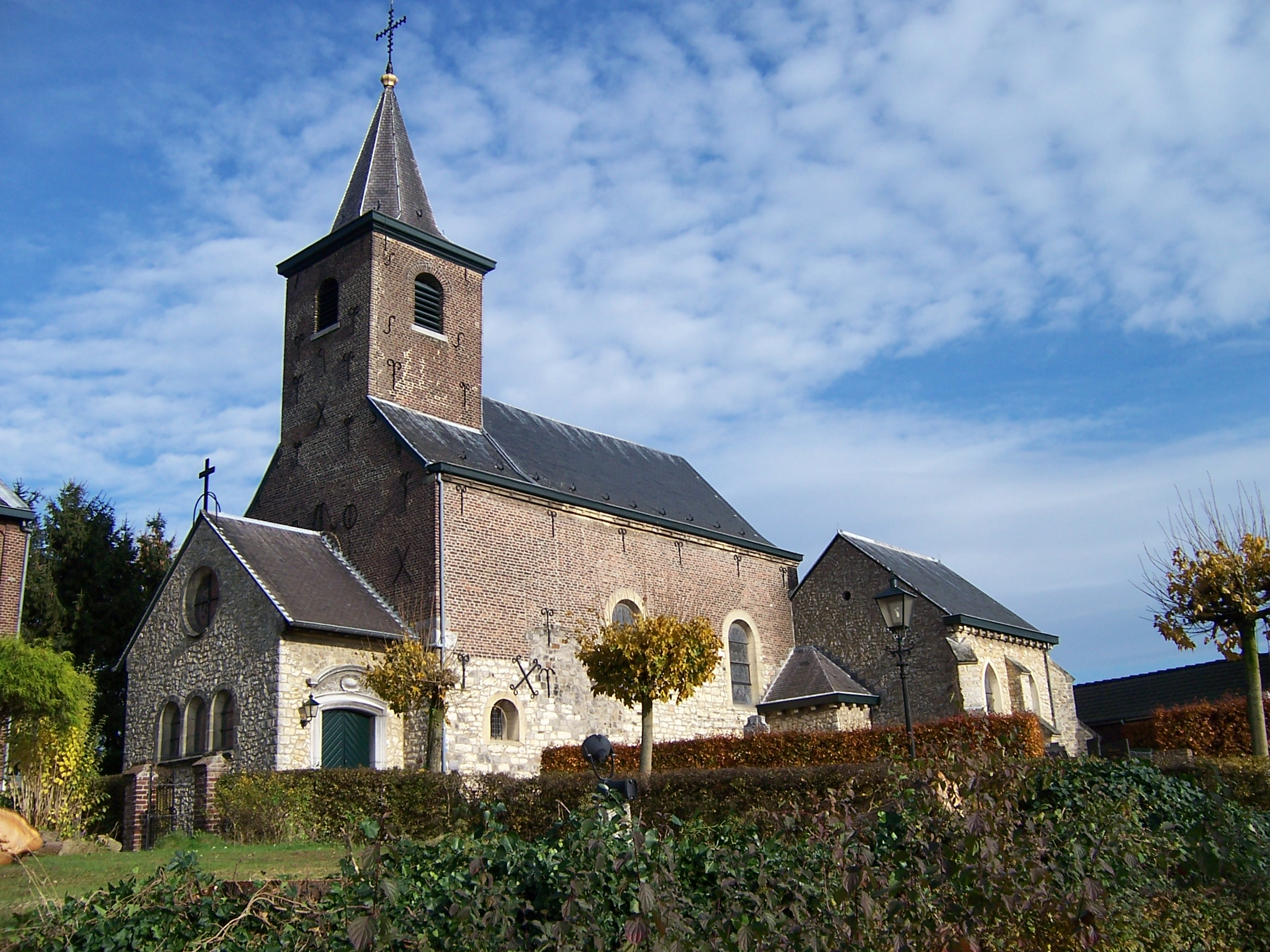
Cunibertus Church

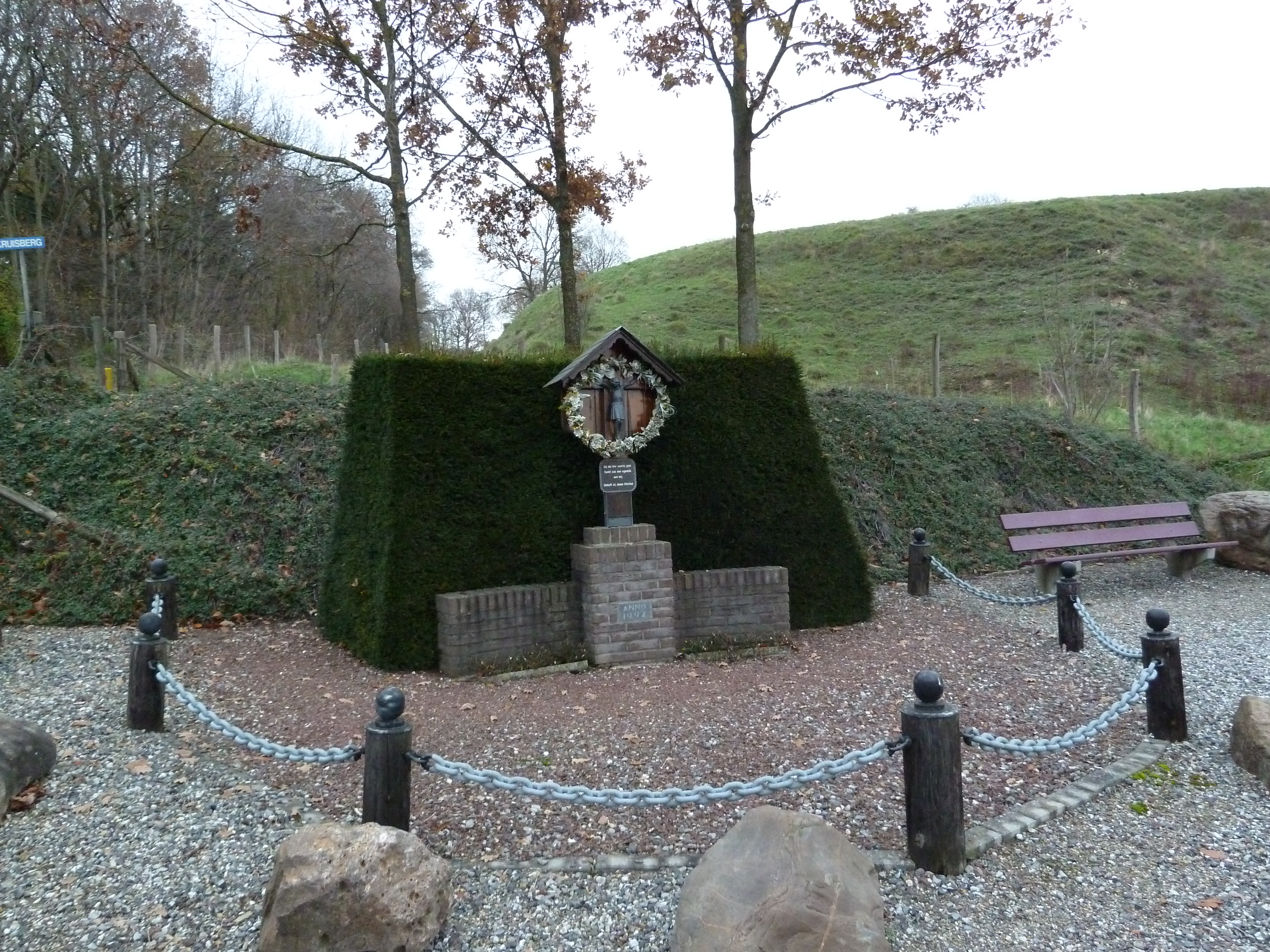
Road cross on the Botterweck street
