= Cas Spijkers =

Dutch chef

- Born: Caspar Henricus Augustinus Spijkers; 12 January 1946; Tilburg
- Died: 29 October 2011 (aged 65); Oirschot
- Occupation: Chef
- Employer: Self-employed
- Known for: Michelin starred De Swaen, Koken met Sterren
- Website: http://casspijkers.nl

Caspar Henricus Augustinus (Cas) Spijkers (12 January 1946 in Tilburg – 29 October 2011 in Oirschot) was a Dutch head chef and author of several cookbooks. He is also known for his cooking program Koken met Sterren. In 1984, the cooking of Spijkers earned restaurant De Swaen two Michelin stars.

In 1980, Spijkers became head chef of De Swaen, resulting in a Michelin star in 1981. After Spijkers stepped back as head chef in 1998, the restaurant lost his star.

== After The Swaen ==
"Princess Household Appliances BV" collaborated with Spijkers to promote its kitchen appliances. They also backed him for his "month restaurant" Chez Cas in "De Kersentuin" in Amsterdam in 2006.

In 2007, Spijkers announced the Cas Spijkers Academie. This was a high-end cooking school under his supervision. The academy, a partnership between Spijkers and several educational centres, started in 2009 in Boxmeer.

== Controversy ==
In 2005, author Ronald Giphart published the book Troost. Giphart claimed that Cas Spijkers and De Swaen were his models for this book. Cas Spijkers was very surprised to hear that he was responsible for the demise of De Swaen, because he left there a few years before they lost their stars.

== Personal life ==
In November 2010 esophageal cancer was discovered.

On the 6 July 2011 Spijkers was appointed as Knight of the Order of Orange Nassau for his great services to the Dutch culinary culture.

Spijkers died on 29 October 2011 aged 65 from the effects of his illness.

== Bibliography ==
- En Cas (2005); And Cas
- Cas kookt kunst (2004); Cas cooks Art
- Het basiskookboek (2004); The basic cookbook
- Leer koken met Cas Spijkers (2000); Learn to cook with Cas Spijkers
- Kerst met Cas (1998); Christmas with Cas
- Bijzondere hoofdgerechten (1998); Special main courses
- Bijzondere gerechten met kaas (1997); Special dishes with cheese
- Bijzondere voorgerechten (1997); Special entrees
- Bijzondere nagerechten (1997); Special desserts
- Mijn keuken (1997); My Kitchen
- Cas Spijkers en zijn Swaen (1986, 1998); Cas Spijkers and his Swaen (1986, revised edition 1998)
