= Toine Hermsen (chef) =

Toine Hermsen is a Dutch head chef and former owner of the now defunct restaurant Toine Hermsen in Maastricht. He held one or two Michelin stars for 23 years.
