= Toine Hermsen (restaurant) =

Coordinates: 50°50′48.85″N 5°41′38.77″E

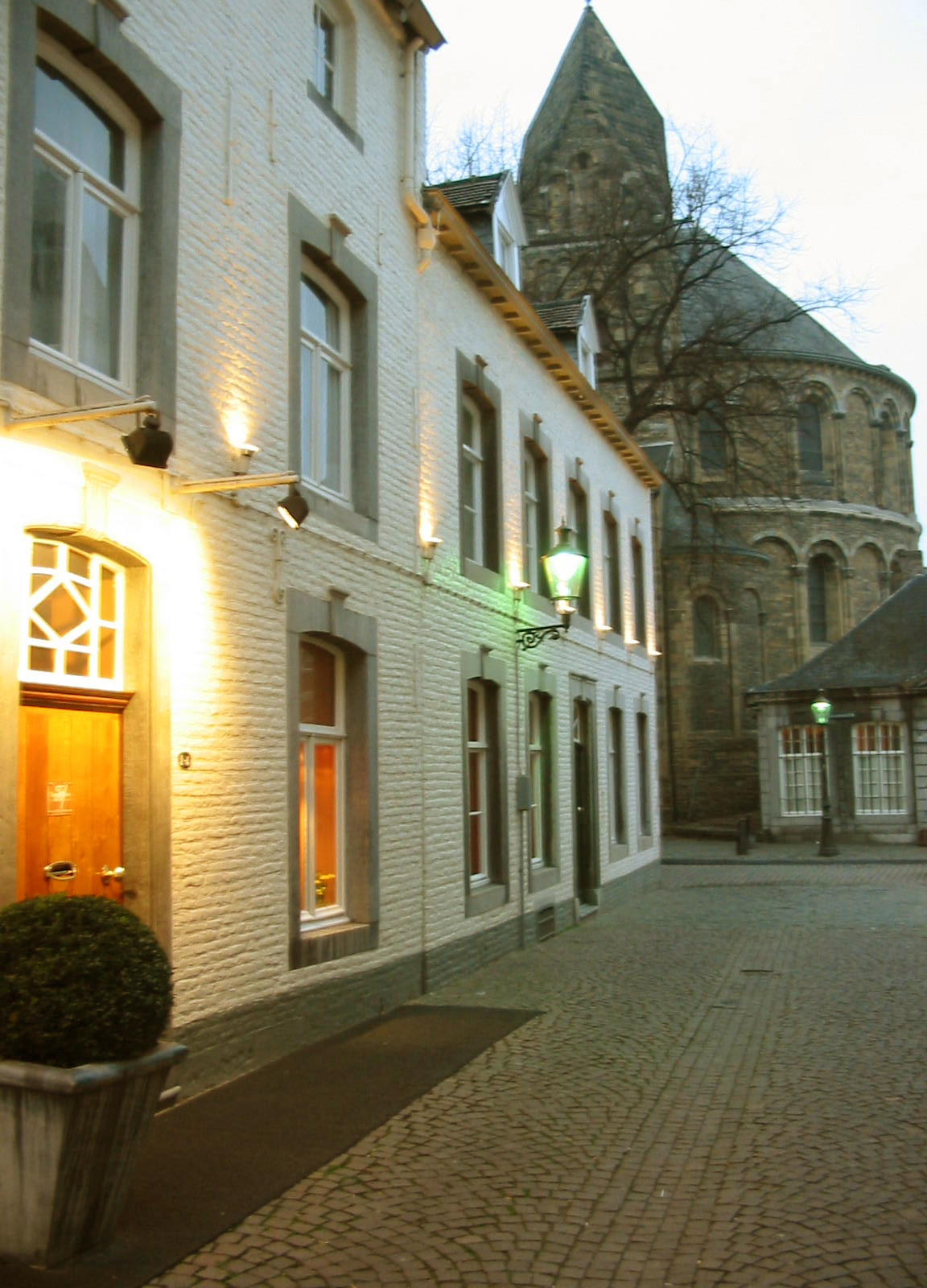
- Interactive map of Toine Hermsen

Restaurant information
- Established: 1990
- Head chef: Toine Hermsen
- Food type: French
- Rating: Michelin Guide
- Location: Sint Bernardusstraat 2 - 4, Maastricht, 6211 HL, Netherlands
- Seating capacity: 45
- Website: Official website

Toine Hermsen is a restaurant located in Maastricht in the Netherlands. It is a fine dining restaurant that was awarded one or two Michelin stars from 1993 to present. GaultMillau awarded the restaurant 16.0 out of 20 points.

Toine Hermsen is a member of Les Patrons Cuisiniers.

== Star History ==
- 1993-1997: one star
- 1998-2001: two stars
- 2002–2015: one star

== See also ==
- List of Michelin starred restaurants in the Netherlands

== Sources and references ==
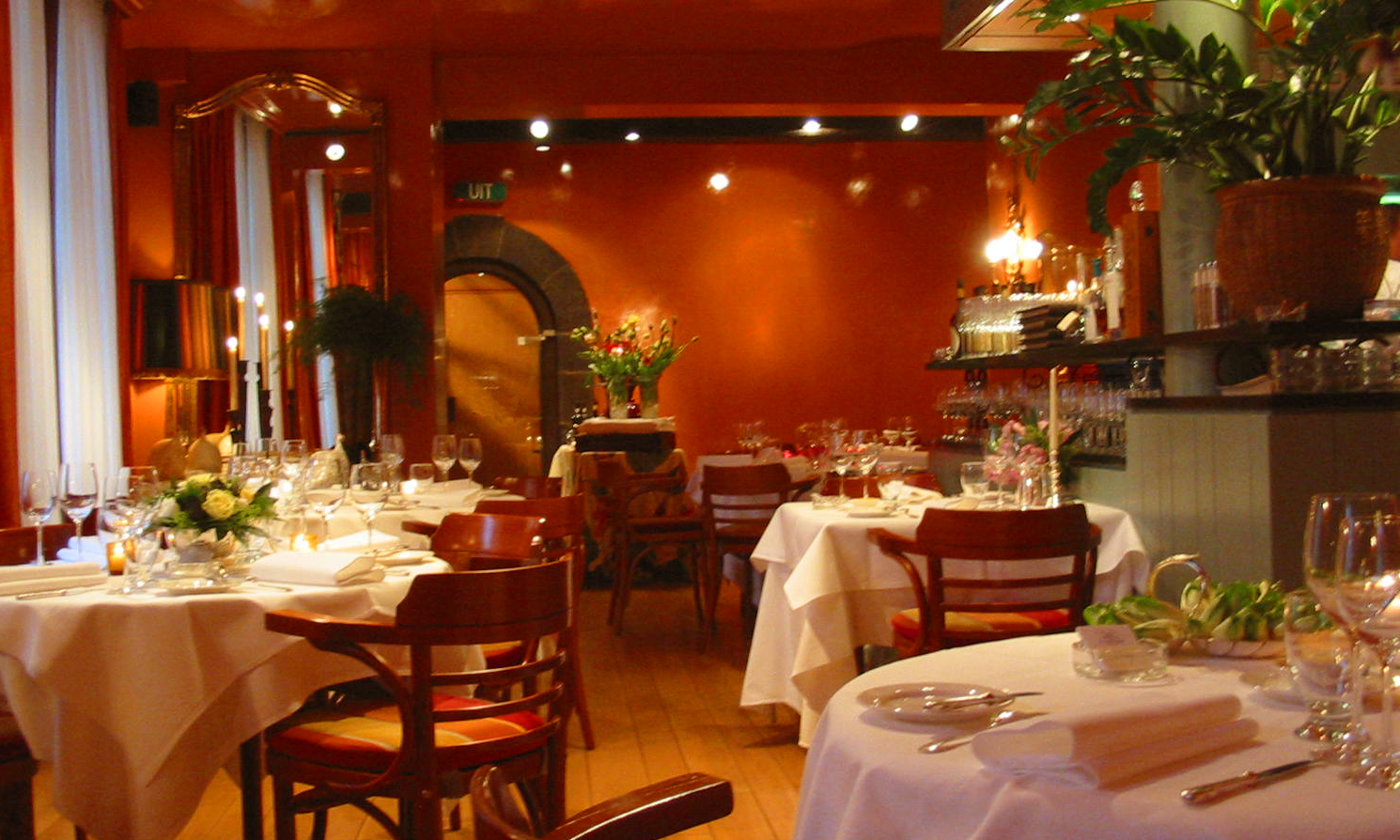
Interior
