= Celeste (name) =

Celeste or Céleste is a given name or surname which derives from the Latin caelestis, meaning heavenly or celestial.

The name may refer to:

== Given name ==
=== Performers ===
- Celeste (singer) (born 1994), British-Jamaican singer-songwriter
- Celeste Anderson (also known as BiiTTERSWEET), Filipino Canadian competitive gamer and reality television personality
- Céleste Alkan (1812–1897), French musician
- Celeste Bonin or Kaitlyn (wrestler) (born 1986), American model, bodybuilder and professional wrestler
- Celeste Buckingham (born 1995), Slovak-American singer
- Celeste Carballo (born 1956), Argentine singer-songwriter rock, blues, hard rock, punk and tango
- Celeste Cid (born 1984), Argentine actress
- Celeste Coltellini (1760–1828), Italian soprano
- Celeste Cortesi (born 1997), Filipino-Italian model and beauty pageant titleholder
- Céleste-Thérèse Couperin (1792–1869), French organist, composer, educator
- Celeste Dandeker (born c. 1952), British dancer
- Celeste De Luna (born 1974), American printmaker, educator
- Celeste Headlee (born 1969), American radio and television host in Public Broadcasting
- Celeste Holm (1917–2012), American stage, film and television actress
- Celeste Jaguaribe de Matos Faria (1873–1938), Brazilian composer, poet, singer and teacher
- Celeste Johnson (born 1959), known as Celeste in Italy, American model
- Celeste Legaspi (born 1950), Filipino singer and actress
- Celeste Loots (born 1996), South African actress
- Celeste Mendoza (1930–1998), Cuban singer
- Céleste Mogador (1824–1909), French dancer and writer also known as Mogador
- Celeste O'Connor (born 1998), American actress
- Celeste Thorson (born 1984), American actress, model, screenwriter and activist
- Celeste Yarnall (1944–2018), American actress

=== Writers ===
- Celeste, a pseudonym of American-born, British astrologer Patric Walker
- Celeste De Blasis (1946–2001), American author of historical romance novels
- Celeste Gold Broughton (1925–2022), American writer and socialite
- Celeste Katz, American senior politics writer
- Celeste McCollough (1927–2023), American psychologist
- Celeste Ng (born 1980), American author and novelist
- Celeste Olalquiaga, Venezuelan scholar
- Celeste Comegys Peardon (1898–1988), American writer and educator
- Celeste Raspanti (born 1928), American playwright
- Celeste West (1942–2008), American librarian and lesbian author
- Celeste M. A. Winslow (1837–1908), American author

=== Sportspeople ===
- Celeste Boureille (born 1994), American soccer player
- Celeste D'Arcángelo (born 2003), Argentinian rhythmic gymnast
- Celeste Ferraris (born 1970), Australian synchronized swimmer
- Celeste García (born 1964), Peruvian swimmer
- Celeste Pin (1961–2025), Italian (male) football player
- Celeste Plak (born 1995), Dutch volleyball player
- Celeste Poltera, Swiss (male) bobsledder
- Celeste Raack (born 1994), Australian cricketer
- Celeste Taylor (born 2001), American basketball player
- Celeste Troche (born 1981), Paraguayan golfer

=== Other ===
- Celeste Baranski, American electronic engineer, entrepreneur, and executive
- Celeste Beard (born 1963), convicted American murderer
- Céleste Boursier-Mougenot (born 1961), French artist
- Celeste Brackett Newcomer (1871–1951), American educator, clubwoman
- Céleste Bulkeley (1759–1832), French soldier in the Catholic and Royal Army during the war in the Vendée
- Celeste Farotti (1864–1928), violin maker in the modern Milanese school
- Celeste Freytes (born 1950), Puerto Rican academic administrator
- Celeste Rivas Hernandez (c. 2010–2025), a girl whose body was found in D4vd's Tesla.
- Celeste de Longpré Heckscher (1860–1928), American composer
- Celeste Kaplan (née Strack, 1915–1998), American social worker, educator, and activist
- Céleste Lett (born 1951), French politician, member of the National Assembly of France
- Celeste Liddle (born 1978), Australian Indigenous feminist
- Celeste Mountjoy, Australian artist and illustrator
- Celeste Rodriguez (born 1990), American politician
- Celeste M. Stiehl (née Sullivan; 1925–2026), American politician
- Celeste Tanfani, Italian pastellist artist (18th century)
- Celeste Ulrich (1924–2011), American educator and leader in the field of physical education
- Celeste A. Wallander (born 1961), American international relations expert with a focus on Russia
- Celeste Woss y Gil (1890–1985) Dominican Republic painter

== Middle name ==
- Crystal Celeste Grant (born 1980), American actress
- Louis Celeste Lecesne (c. 1796 or 1798–1847), an anti-slavery activist from the Caribbean islands
- María Celeste Arrarás (born 1960), better known as María Celeste, Puerto Rican broadcast journalist and author
- Tennessee Celeste Claflin (1844–1923), also known as Tennie C., American suffragist and businesswoman

== Surname ==
- Arianny Celeste (born 1985), American model and ring girl
- Arthur Celeste (born 1962), Filipino politician
- Bryan Celeste (born 1996), Filipino mayor from Alaminos
- Dagmar Braun Celeste (born 1941), American counselor, Christian priest, and author
- Dick Celeste (born 1937), American politician - governor of Ohio 1983–1991
- Erika Celeste, American journalist who has worked in radio, print, and television
- Francis Celeste Le Blond (1821–1902), American politician and a Democratic member of the U.S. House of Representatives
- Madame Céleste (1815–1882), French dancer and actress
- Maria Celeste (1600–1634), born Virginia Galilei, Italian Roman Catholic nun
- Michele Celeste, Italian playwright
- Rodrigo Celeste (born 1990), Brazilian football player
- Shanti Celeste, Chilean DJ from Bristol
- Ted Celeste (born 1945), American politician in Ohio

=== Fictional characters ===
- Celeste Perrault, character on soap opera Days of Our Lives

== See also ==
- Celeste (disambiguation)
- Celestia (name)
- Celia (given name)
