= Celest =

Celest refers to:

- Celest (restaurant), a fine dining restaurant and bar in Rotterdam, the Netherlands
- Celest Chong, a Singaporean actress, singer and former cover model

== See also ==
- Celesta, a type of keyboard musical instrument
- Celeste (disambiguation)
- Celestia (disambiguation)
- Celestial (disambiguation)
