= Albeit Living =

Studio album by Sextile
- Released: July 14, 2017
- Genre: Synth punk; art punk
- Length: 26:59
- Label: Felte
- Producer: Brady Keehn; Melissa Scaduto

Sextile chronology
A Thousand Hands (2015)	Albeit Living (2017)	Push (2023)

Albeit Living is the second studio album by American rock band Sextile. Produced by band members Brady Keehn and Melissa Scaduto, it was released on July 14, 2017 by Felte record label.

== Background and music ==
Albeit Living was recorded in the Echo Park residence of the band. The announcement of the album was accompanied by the release of the single "One of These" and its music video.

Named after the Circle X song of the same name, the record is described as a synth punk and art punk album. The sound on the record, which was compared to the works of Circle X, Deutsch Amerikanische Freundschaft, and Chrome, places a bigger emphasis on the synthesizer, with band member Melissa Scaduto characterizing it "more post-punk" and "no wavy" compared to the dark wave stylings of their debut album.

== Critical reception ==
Professional ratings
Review scores
Source	Rating
AllMusic	4/5 stars
Loud and Quiet	7/10

AllMusic critic Heather Phares gave a positive review to Albeit Living, stating that the band "have sharpened their attack since their debut, ditching A Thousand Hands' brooding for weird, frantic songs that overflow with lust, anxiety, and memorable catch phrases." Phares further wrote: "What Albeit Living lacks in nuance it more than makes up for in trashy, gleeful abandon -- something too many late-2010s synth punk revivalists (and rock bands in general) are missing." Katie Beswick of Loud and Quiet described the record as an "a joyously angry, politically-charged celebration of the absurdity of living in the present day, with a distinctly ’70s punk feel." Writing for Louder Than War, Ged Babey noted that "Sextile have found their own identity and a niche where they are the fucked-up royalty" and stated Albeit Living to be "one of the best albums I have heard this year to have come screaming out of the USA."

== Track listing ==
Album track listing as adapted from Bandcamp. All songs written by Sextile.

1. "One of These" — 2:27
2. "Who Killed Six" — 2:28
3. "Ripped" — 3:13
4. "Floored" — 2:36
5. "Mental" — 2:40
6. "Sterilized" — 3:05
7. "Das Cat" — 2:30
8. "Situations" — 2:19
9. "Crisis" — 2:08
10. "AVC" — 3:40

== Personnel ==
Album personnel as adapted from liner notes.

- Brady Keehn — performer, producer
- Melissa Scaduto — performer, producer, artwork
- Eddie Wuebben — producer
- Rafael Anton Irisarri — mastering
