= Celest (restaurant) =

Restaurant in Rotterdam, the Netherlands

- Interactive map of Celest

Restaurant information
- Established: January 10, 2025
- Owner: Magnicity
- Chef: Frank van Rijsbergen, Leonardo Sussi
- Food type: international with a focus on locally sourced products
- Location: Gedempte Zalmhaven 20, Rotterdam, 3016 DT, the Netherlands
- Coordinates: 51°54′37″N 4°28′50″E
- Seating capacity: 275 on the 57th floor; 108 in the restaurant; 300 including staff (total)
- Website: celest.nl

Celest is a fine dining restaurant and bar in Rotterdam, the Netherlands. The restaurant is situated on the 57th and 58th floor of De Zalmhaven tower at a height 190 meters, making it the highest horeca business in the Benelux.

== History ==
External videos
- Celest Rotterdam
- Droneshow and grand opening Celest at Zalmhaven in Rotterdam

To mark its opening, Celest organized a drone show above the Erasmus Bridge in Rotterdam. Approximately 400 drones, launched from the Kop van Zuid near Hotel New York, formed images including a hot-air balloon, the outline of the Netherlands, a planet, and a representation of the Zalmhaventoren. The ten-minute show was produced by the Amsterdam-based company Drone Stories, which has also created drone displays for events such as Coachella, Burning Man, and the Amsterdam Dance Event. Celest was temporarily closed due to damage that occurred during scheduled maintenance in the Zalmhaventoren. Water released during the work affected both the technical installations and parts of the restaurant. After a period of restoration work, the company has opted for a phased reopening.

In late 2025, after months of closure due to water damage that affected its technical installations, Celest began a phased reopening. Initially it hosted private and corporate events, and by early January 2026 the skybar started opening on Friday and Saturday evenings for regular visitors as part of a step-by-step return to full operation. Opening of the restaurant followed on 16 September 2026.

== Concept and storytelling ==
The name Celest is derived from the Latin word for heavenly (caelestis, from caelum (“heaven, sky”) + -estris). The restaurant incorporates storytelling as part of its concept and interior design, a relatively recent trend in the hospitality industry in which guests are invited to experience the underlying narrative. The inspiration for Celest stems from The Unparalleled Adventure of One Hans Pfaall (1835), a story by Edgar Allan Poe about a Rotterdam native who travels to the moon in a self-built hot-air balloon. This early science fiction tale served as the basis for the interior design created by the architectural firm Doepel Strijkers.

Several design elements reference this theme, including a prominent 2.5-metre digital moon globe and intimate dining spaces referred to as ‘moon pods’. Celest’s logo combines nineteenth-century stylistic references, such as the hot-air balloon, with contemporary typography, reflecting the thematic interplay between historical imagination and modern experience.

== Cuisine ==
The restaurant offers a seasonal menu developed in collaboration with local suppliers. Former head chef Drost based the dishes on the availability of regional products, such as fish and vegetables, and combines these with international cooking techniques. Celest employs sous-chefs Frank van Rijsbergen, previously of Allure and FG and named Rotterdam Culinary Talent in 2014, and Leonardo Sussi, formerly of Fitzgerald.

Celest was led by head chef Lars Drost, who previously worked at the two-Michelin-starred restaurant Ciel Bleu in Amsterdam. In early 2026, Drost, who had been leading the kitchen at Celest since late 2024, left the restaurant to become the chef of the new fine dining restaurant at the Mandarin Oriental Hotel in Amsterdam. Drost’s departure was announced ahead of his departure from Celest on 1 February 2026 amid ongoing phased reopening efforts following earlier water damage at the Zalmhaven tower location; as of the announcement, no replacement had been named.

== See also ==
- List of restaurants in Rotterdam
