= List of restaurants in Rotterdam =

In July 2022 Rotterdam, Netherlands, counted 2,228 restaurants and cafes. Out of 840 restaurants listed in the Gault Millau restaurant guide for the Netherlands, 52 can be found in Rotterdam. The Parkheuvel restaurant was in 2002 the first restaurant in the Netherlands to receive 3 Michelin stars.

== Current ==
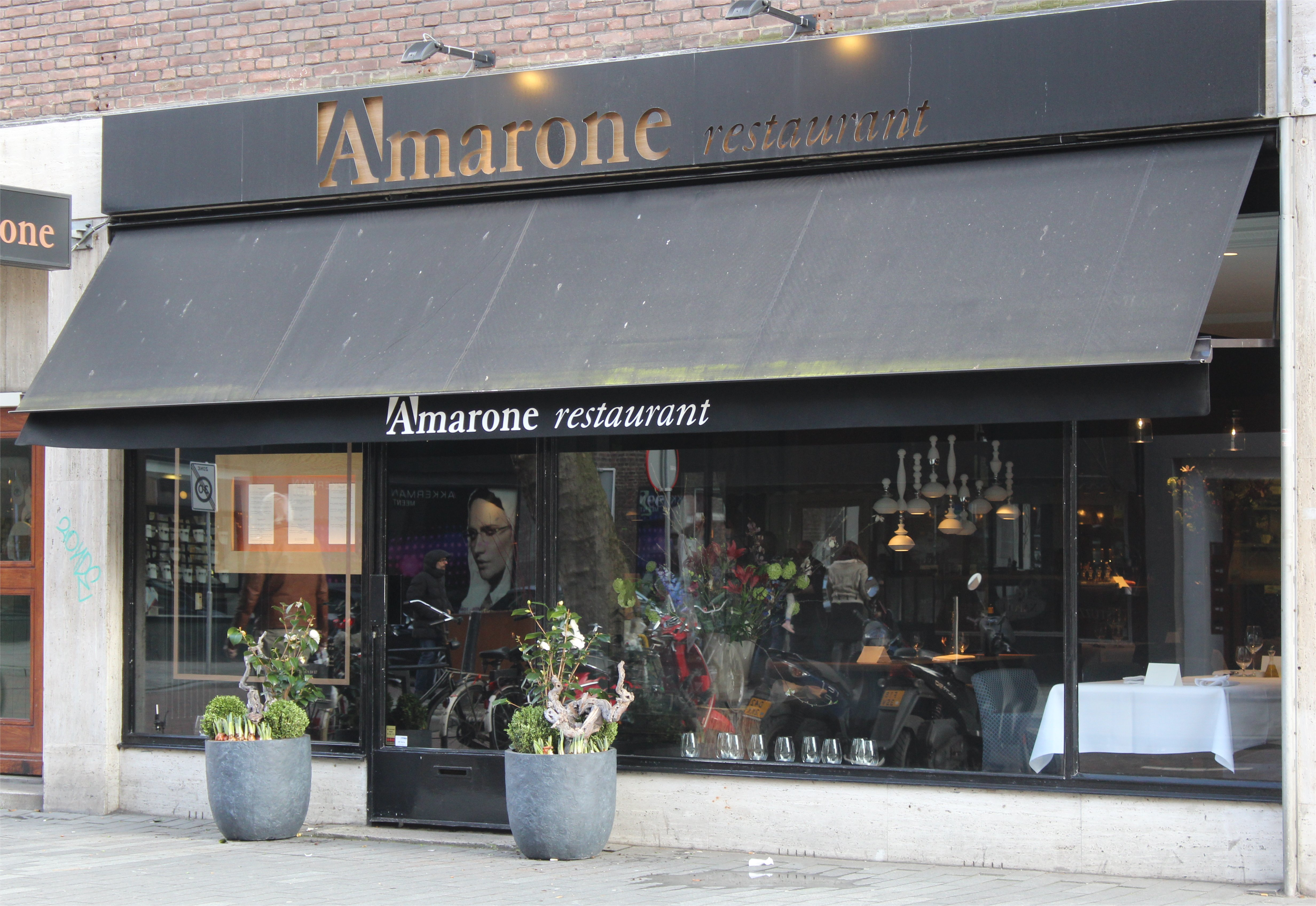
The Amarone restaurant

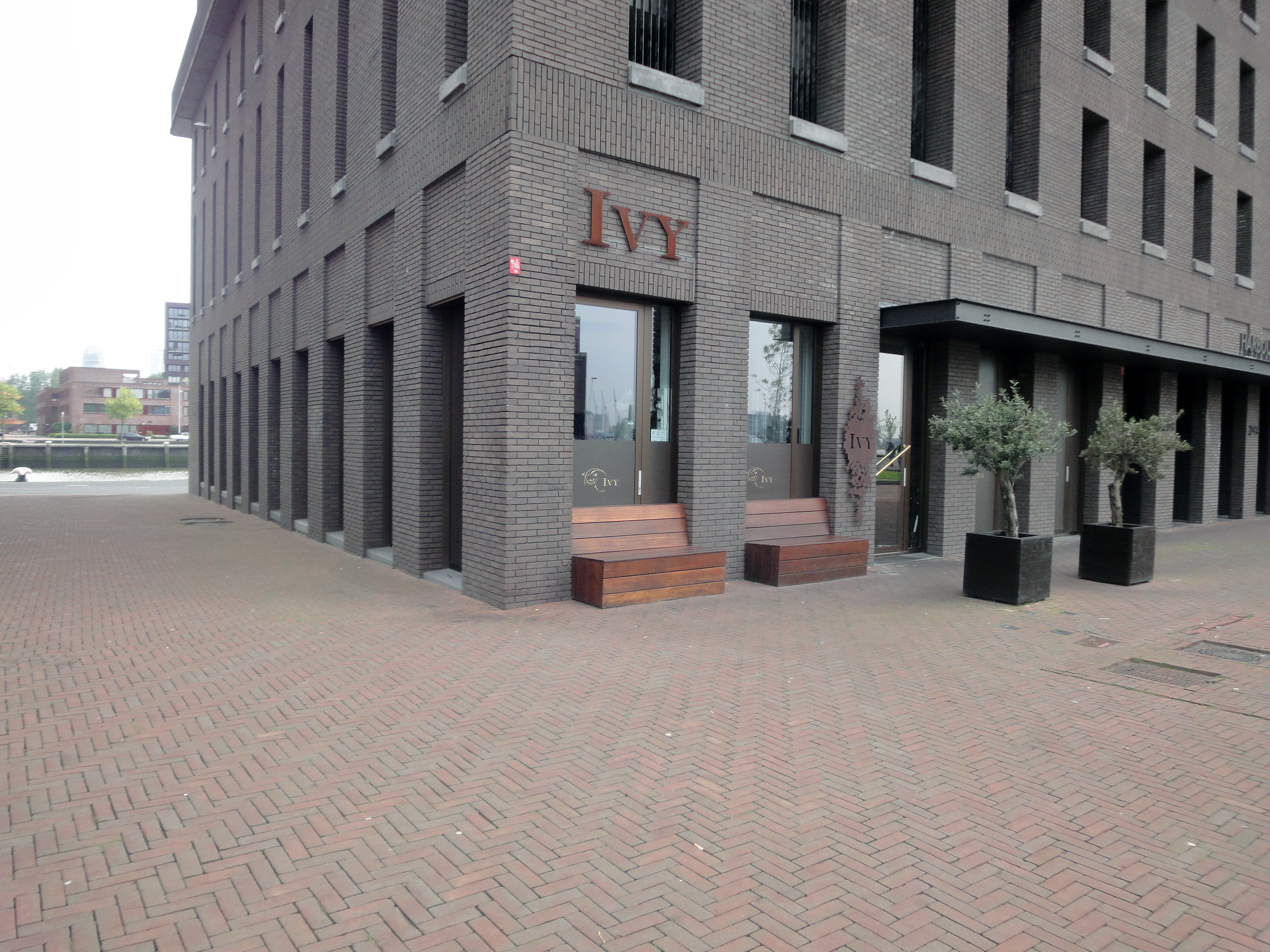
FG when it was still named Ivy

Notable restaurants currently operating in Rotterdam include:

- 1NUL8 (4 locations in Rotterdam)
- Black Smoke
- Amarone
- Celest
- De Engel
- Fitzgerald
- FG
- Fred
- Joelia
- Old Dutch
- Parkheuvel
- The Millèn
- Zalmhuis (postal code in Capelle aan den IJssel)

== Defunct ==
Defunct restaurants include:

- Coq d'Or
- La Vilette

== See also ==
- List of Michelin starred restaurants in the Netherlands
- List of restaurants in Amsterdam
- Dutch cuisine
