= Celestia (name) =

- Gender: Female
- Language: Latin

Origin
- Meaning: heavenly

Other names
- Related names: Celeste

Celestia is a female given name, which is a variant of Celeste, and which means "heavenly" or "of the sky" in Latin. The name may refer to:

- Celestia De Lamour (born 1950), Vietnamese religious leader
- Celestia Parrish (1853–1918), American educator
- Celestia Shambaugh (1881–1971), American educator
- Celestia Taylor (1903–1996), American professor of English

== Fictional characters ==
- Princess Celestia (voiced by Nicole Oliver), a character in the TV show My Little Pony: Friendship Is Magic
- Celestia Ludenberg, a character from the game Danganronpa: Trigger Happy Havoc

== See also ==
- Celest (disambiguation)
- Celeste (disambiguation)
- Celestia (disambiguation)
- Celestial (disambiguation)
