= Zalmhuis =

Restaurant in Rotterdam, the Netherlands

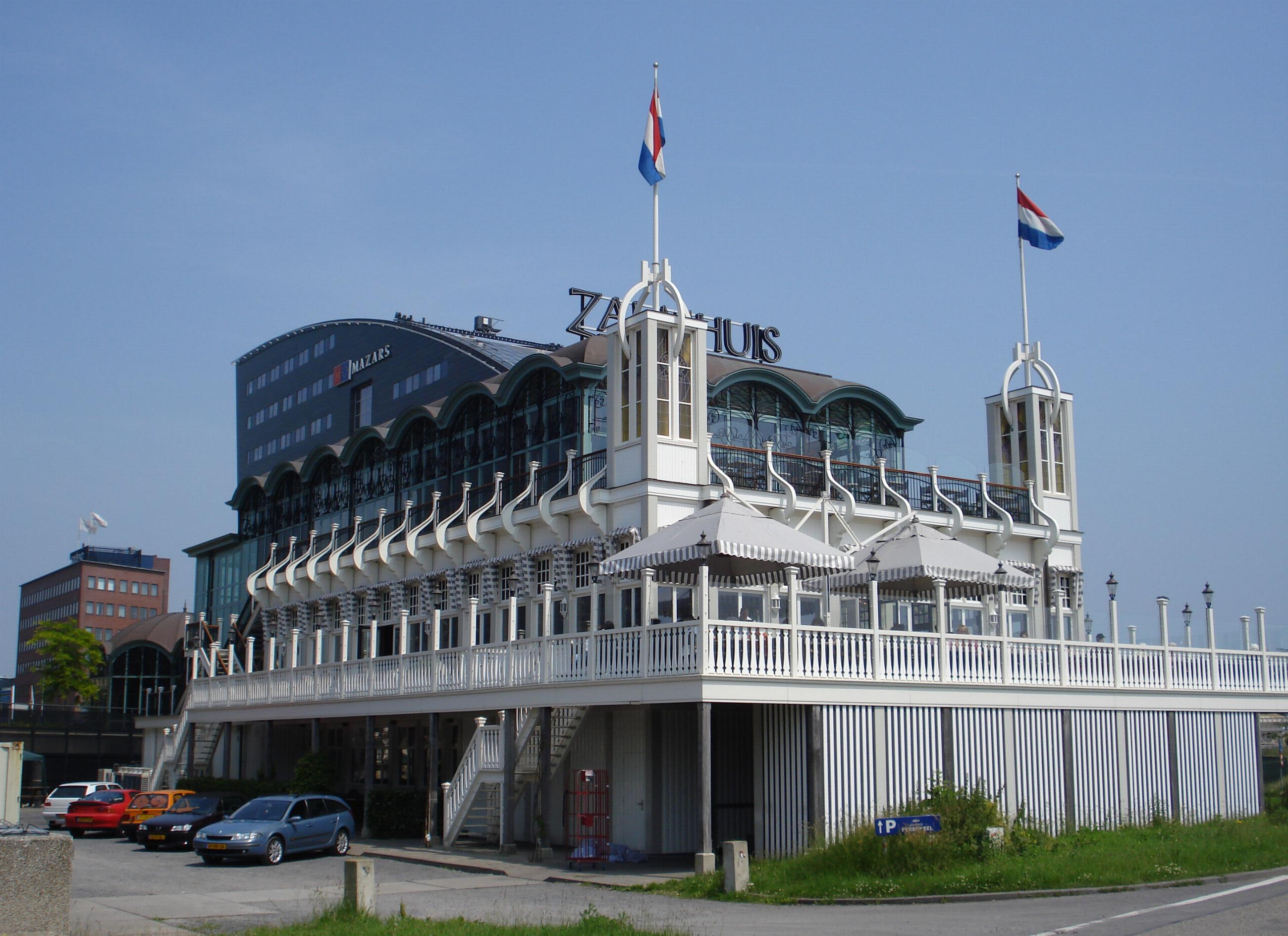
- The Zalmhuis restaurant in 2008 before the 2020 renovation.
- Interactive map of Zalmhuis

Restaurant information
- Established: February 8, 2020 (after renovation)
- Owner: Hell's Kitchen Horeca Group
- Head chef: Lars Litz
- Location: Schaardijk 396, Capelle aan den IJssel, 2909 LA, the Netherlands
- Coordinates: 51°54′24″N 4°32′46″E
- Website: zalmhuis.nl

Zalmhuis is a fine dining restaurant in Rotterdam, (Note: The official website presents the Zalmhuis as being located in Rotterdam, although the postal address in the footer lists Capelle aan den IJssel. The Zalmhuis is located on the Schaardijk 396 along the Nieuwe Maas near the Van Brienenoord Bridge, in the area historically known as Kralingseveer. Kralingen, including Kralingseveer, was annexed by Rotterdam in 1895. In 1941 the eastern part of the area situated beyond the IJsselmondselaan, which until then belonged to Capelle aan den IJssel, was also annexed by Rotterdam as part of a large-scale expansion. Subsequent boundary adjustments, however, reassigned the plot on which the Zalmhuis stands to Capelle aan den IJssel, giving the building its present postal address in that municipality (postcode 2909). This administrative situation has often caused confusion, as geographically and culturally many Rotterdammers continue to regard the Zalmhuis as a Rotterdam landmark.) the Netherlands. The current building, completed in 2002, was designed as a successor to the original salmon auction and pavilion that operated on the site from 1863 until the mid-20th century. While the historic structure was demolished in the 1950s, the present Zalmhuis incorporates architectural elements and historical references that reflect its legacy.

== History ==
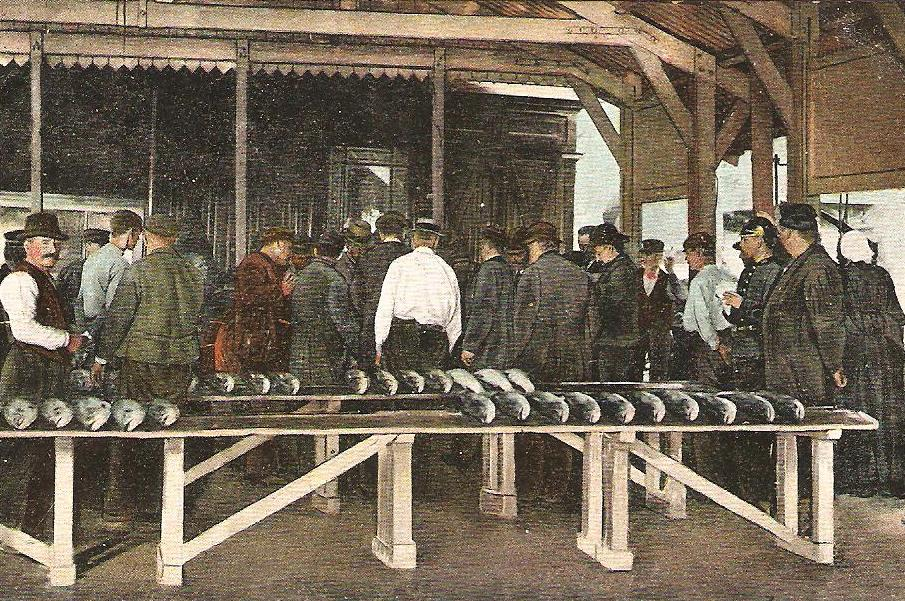
Zalmhuis in 1905.

The history of the Zalmhuis dates back to 1863, when Adriaan Dekkers purchased an inn with an outdoor terrace on the Hooge Zeedijk. Opposite the establishment, known as Estaminet, stood a pavilion and yard. In 1875, Dekkers constructed a covered market on the riverside site for the auction and sale of river fish such as salmon, allis shad, ide, whitefish, twait shad, and sturgeon. This market grew into the largest salmon auction in the Netherlands.

Around 1880, the complex was acquired by Jan van den Akker, who developed the café into a thriving business. In 1896, he added a pavilion above the salmon market, which in 1905 was replaced by a larger Art Nouveau–style structure built on steel columns over the water. This marked the first heyday of the Zalmhuis.

Decline set in soon after the 1906 opening, as salmon stocks in Dutch rivers sharply decreased. The North Sea flood of 1953, combined with advancing industrialization and the construction of the Van Brienenoord Bridge, accelerated the demise. The accompanying ferry lost its function, and by 1955 the original building was demolished.

In 1999, construction began on a new Zalmhuis, which officially opened in 2002 as a restaurant. A major renovation in 2020 gave the building a characteristic interior.

In December 2021, Zalmhuis received an Entree Award in the category Best New Restaurant & Bar. The award was officially announced in early 2022. The jury praised the restaurant’s redesign following its 2020 takeover, highlighting the attention to detail and the experiential quality of the interior design.

== Cuisine ==
The menu at Zalmhuis emphasizes fish dishes, particularly salmon. According to the restaurant, it serves chum salmon from Alaska, reportedly sourced from fisheries of the Yup'ik community along the Yukon River. Zalmhuis also offers house-smoked organic Scottish salmon, dry-aged beef, vegan dishes, and oysters. A proprietary gin, named BRAK, has been developed for the restaurant. The kitchen is headed by chef Lars Litz.

== See also ==
- List of restaurants in Rotterdam
