= Black Smoke =

Black smoke or Black Smoke may refer to:

- Soot, which appears as black smoke
- Black smoke (The War of the Worlds), a fictional alien weapon in H.G. Wells 1898 novel The War of the Worlds
- Black Smoke (song), a song performed by German singer Ann Sophi for the 2015 German Eurovision entry
- Black Smoke Rising, an album by Greta Van Fleet
- Black Smoke (restaurant), European restaurant chain
- Black Smoke Band, the creators of Jeff Wayne's Musical Version of The War of the Worlds
- Black Smoke Shen Long, a Dragon Ball character
- Black smoke, a manifestation of the Man in Black from the TV series Lost
- Black smokers, a type of hydrothermal vent
- Fumata showing a pope has not been elected
- Blacksmoke (band) a.k.a. Black Smoke, a mid 1970s American funk group
