= Sextile (band) =

American post-punk band

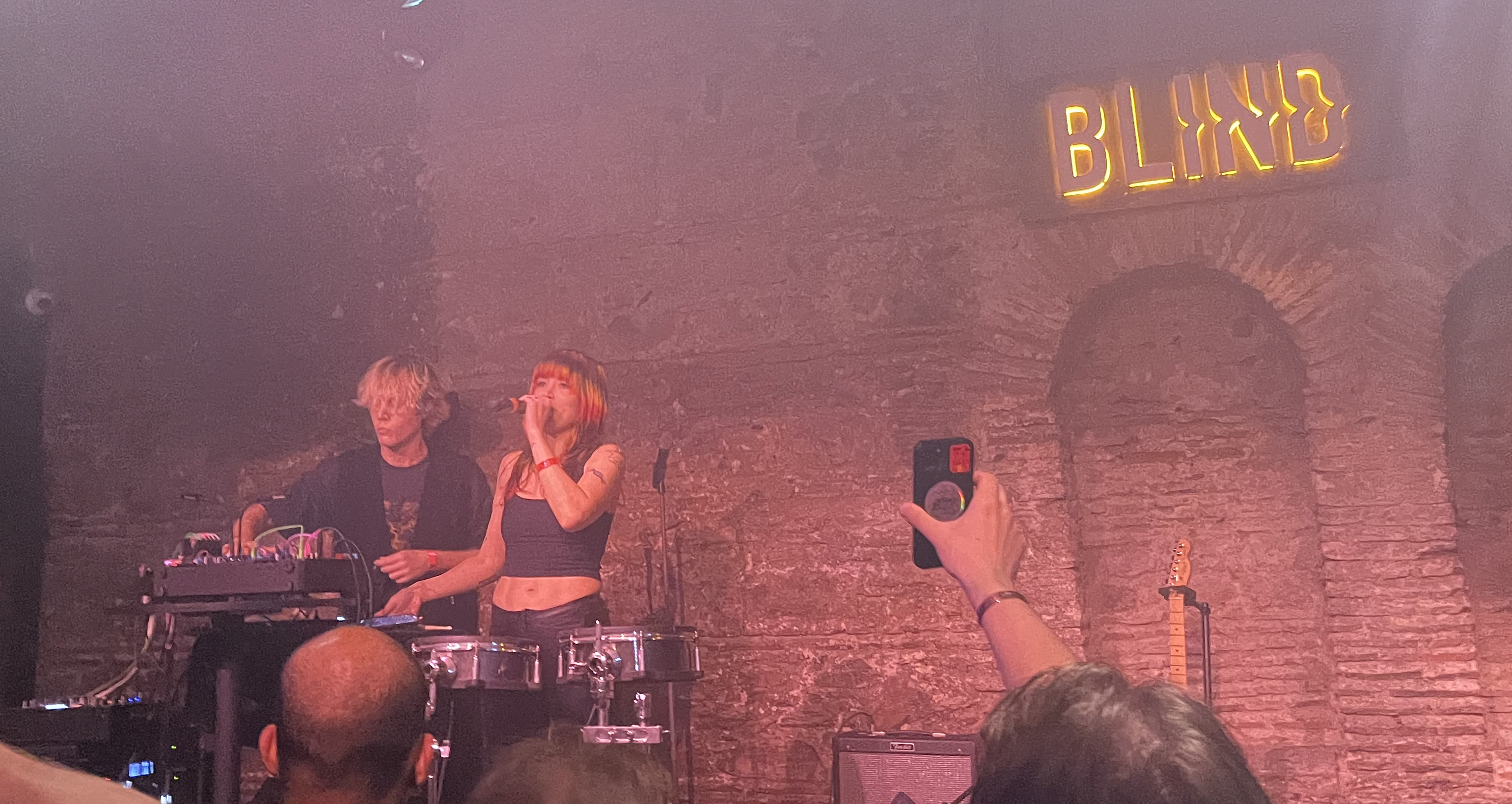
- Sextile in 2025: Brady Keehn (left) and Melissa Scaduto (right)

Background information
- Origin: Los Angeles, California, U.S.
- Genres: Post-punk; electronic rock; synth-punk
- Years active: 2015–2019; 2022–present
- Labels: Felte; Sacred Bones
- Members: Brady Keehn; Melissa Scaduto
- Past members: Cameron Michel; Eddie Wuebben; Kenny Elkin; Lia Simone Braswell
- Website: sextile.bandcamp.com

Sextile is an American electronic music project from Los Angeles, California. The project consists of founding members Brady Keehn (vocals, guitar, electronics) and Melissa Scaduto (drums, electronics, guitar). The project takes its name from the aspect of the same name in astrology.

== History ==
Sextile was formed in 2015 by Keehn and Scaduto, after the duo relocated from Brooklyn, New York to Los Angeles. They were soon joined by bassist Kenny Elkin and multi-instrumentalist Eddie Wuebben. Signing to Felte Records after supporting Ritual Howls at local gigs, the band released its debut album, A Thousand Hands in the same year. Its follow-up, Albeit Living, was released in 2017; by the time of its release, Elkin was replaced by bassist Cameron Michel.

In 2018, with the band reduced to its two founding members for their EP, 3, later in the year. Sextile entered a hiatus in 2019, with Keehn and Scaduto pursuing other projects, Panther Modern and S. Product, respectively. The band's former guitarist, Eddie Wuebben, died on 5 October 2019, at the age of 29.

Sextile broke its hiatus with the March 2022 release of "Modern Weekend"/"Contortion", both having been written after Wuebben's death. For summer 2022 tour dates in Mexico and the U.S., Cameron Michel rejoined the band on guitar and keyboards along with new drummer Lia Simone Braswell, formerly of Le Butcherettes and A Place to Bury Strangers. On September 15, 2023, the band has released their third album, Push, on Sacred Bones Records, which was accompanied by a North American tour. Following the departure of Michel, the band announced their fourth studio album, yes, please., which was released on May 2, 2025 on Sacred Bones Records.

== Musical style ==
Sextile's sound has been described as post-punk and electronic rock. Their debut album featured an "occult-inspired post-punk style" that blended industrial, surf-punk, psychobilly and ambient music; the band drew influences from Christian Death, Coil, Brian Eno, The Cramps and The Haxan Cloak during this period. AllMusic critic Heather Phares thought that the record "gave death rock some new life" while featuring "descending riffs, martial beats, and outbursts that light up the darkness like flares." Their second album, Albeit Living, marked a change in style with a synth-punk sound that was likened to the works of Circle X, D.A.F. and Chrome. Michael Toland of The Austin Chronicle wrote that the record collects "post-punk's angular chords, synth-pop's buzzing colors, No Wave's brash indifference, and goth's pessimistic glower." Its follow-up, 2018's 3 EP, showcased further embracement of electronics while introducing elements from EBM and darkwave. The band's third studio album, Push, has showcased significant influences from electronic dance music.

== Band members ==
Current members

- Brady Keehn – vocals, guitars, electronics
- Melissa Scaduto – drums, electronics, guitars, vocals

Former members

- Eddie Wuebben – guitars, synthesizers
- Kenny Elkin – bass

Former Touring members

- Lia Simone Braswell – drums
- Cameron Michel – guitars, keyboards

== Discography ==
Studio albums

- A Thousand Hands (2015)
- Albeit Living (2017)
- Push (2023)
- Yes, Please. (2025)

EP

- 3 (2018)

Singles

- "Paradox" (2018)
- "Modern Weekend" / "Contortion" (2022)
- "New York" (2023)
- "Crassy Mel" (2023)
- “Freak Eyes” (2025)
- “S is For” (2025)
- “Kids” (2025)

Music videos

- "Visions of You" (2015)
- "Can't Take It" (2016)
- "One of These" (2017)
- "Ripped" (2017)
- "Disco" (2018)
- "Paradox" (2019)
- "Hazing" (2019)
- "New York" (2023)
- "Crassy Mel" (2023)
- “Freak Eyes” (2025)
- “S is For” (2025)
- “Kids” (2025)
- "Women Respond to Bass" (2025)
