= 1NUL8 =

Restaurant in Rotterdam, the Netherlands

Restaurant information
- Established: 1NUL8 Meent (All day-concept): 2012; 1NUL8 Basement (Modern cocktailbar and restaurant) 2023; 1NUL8 Let’s Meat (Barbecue- and grillrestaurant) 2024; 1NUL8 Noord (French all day-bistro) 2024; 1NUL8 Aan het water (All day-concept) 2026
- Owners: Fabian Loveriks, Floris van der Sluis
- Location: Rotterdam, Zwijndrecht, the Netherlands
- Website: 1nul8.nl

1NUL8 is a chain of restaurants in Rotterdam and Zwijndrecht, the Netherlands.

== History ==
=== Founding of 1NUL8 Meent ===
Van der Sluis had previously founded the all-day restaurant 1NUL8 Meent together with hospitality entrepreneur Ad Schaap, founder of the restaurant chain De Beren. Loveriks later became involved in this establishment. In early 2019, Loveriks and Van der Sluis opened the high-end restaurant Vandal. In October 2022, the venue was forced to close following severe water damage and electrical problems.

=== Founding of 1NUL8 Basement ===
Following the closure of Vandal, the partners developed a new concept that emphasized the central role of the bar. This resulted in the opening of 1NUL8 Basement, which features a large open kitchen and a prominent light-green, wave-shaped bar. The interior was designed to encourage guests to stay for cocktails after dining. On Thursdays the restaurant hosts cocktail nights, while on Fridays and Saturdays a DJ booth is in operation, targeting a late-evening audience.

== Other locations ==
=== Rotterdam ===
==== 1NUL8 Let's Meat ====
1NUL8 Let's Meat is a restaurant on the Binnenrotte in Rotterdam, the Netherlands. The venue opened in July 2025 and specializes in barbecue and grill dishes, with a focus on high-quality meat. The menu also includes a selection of vegetarian and fish options. The restaurant has a floor area of about 450 m^{2} and offers seating for approximately 250 guests. A large outdoor terrace was added for the summer season.

==== 1NUL8 Noord/1NUL8 Le Bistro ====
1NUL8 Noord, also called 1NUL8 Le Bistro, is located on the Bergweg in Rotterdam, the Netherlands. The establishment opened in the fourth quarter of 2024 and operates as a French all-day bistro. It is open daily from 08:00 to 23:00 and has a floor area of approximately 120 m^{2}, providing seating for 60 to 70 guests. The interior, designed by interior architect Dennis Koeslag, features a French style with bistro chairs and marble tiles.

=== Zwijndrecht ===
==== 1NUL8 aan het water ====
1NUL8 Aan het Water is a restaurant scheduled to open in late 2025 or early 2026 in Zwijndrecht, the Netherlands. The venue is expected to resemble the first 1NUL8 location on De Meent in Rotterdam, but with a more low-key concept. It will operate as an all-day establishment, serving breakfast, lunch, and dinner.

== See also ==
- List of restaurants in Rotterdam
