= FG Food Labs =

Restaurant in Rotterdam, the Netherlands

Coordinates: 51.926253°N 4.479472°E

- Interactive map of FG Food Labs

Restaurant information
- Established: 22 january 2014
- Head chef: François Geurds
- Location: Rotterdam, Netherlands
- Website: fgfoodlabs.nl/en/

FG Food Labs is a restaurant in Rotterdam by chef François Geurds. Since 2015, the restaurant has one Michelin star. GaultMillau awarded the restaurant 16.5 points out of a maximum of 20 points.

== See also ==
- List of restaurants in Rotterdam
