= The Millèn =

Restaurant in Rotterdam, the Netherlands

Coordinates: 51.922489°N 4.471525°E

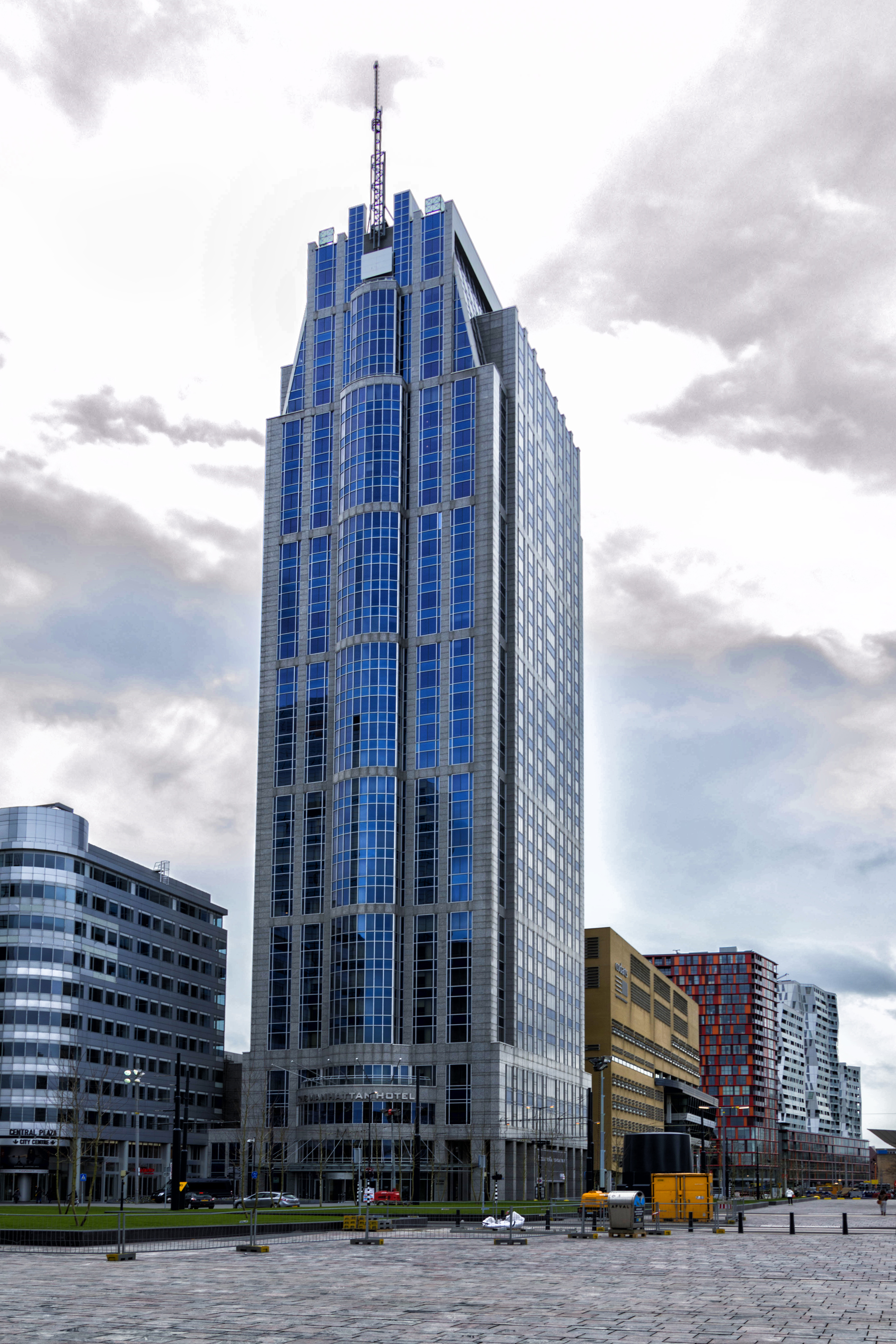
- The Millèn is situated in the Millennium Tower.
- Interactive map of The Millèn

Restaurant information
- Established: 2018
- Head chef: Wim Severein
- Location: Rotterdam, Netherlands
- Website: Official website

The Millèn is a restaurant in Rotterdam. On 17 December 2018, The Millèn received a Michelin star.

== See also ==
- List of restaurants in Rotterdam
