= Prehistory (album) =

Studio album by Circle X
- Released: 1983
- Recorded: 1981 at Skyline Studios, New York City, United States
- Genre: Post-punk, experimental rock
- Length: 35:38
- Label: Index, Enigma

Circle X chronology
Circle X (1979)	Prehistory (1983)	Celestial (1994)

Prehistory is the debut studio album by American experimental rock band Circle X. It was recorded in 1981 but was not released until 1983, jointly through record labels Index and Enigma.

== Background ==
Prehistory was recorded upon their return to New York City, after staying nine months in Dijon, France.

== Release ==
The LP went out of print rapidly, but was later reissued semi-legally by the French label Sordide Sentimentale, featuring the addition of a booklet of essay texts and skin disorder photos.

== Track listing ==
All tracks are written by Circle X (David Letendre, Rick Letendre, Tony Pinotti, Bruce Witsiepe)

Side A
No.	Title	Length
1.	"Current"	6:22
2.	"Prehistory (Part I)"	5:10
3.	"Prehistory (Part II)"	5:16

Side B
No.	Title	Length
1.	"Culture Progress"	6:28
2.	"Underworld"	7:49
3.	"Beyond Standard"	4:33

== Critical reception ==
Professional ratings
Review scores
Source	Rating
AllMusic	3.5/5 stars

Trouser Press, whilst calling the album "more ambitious" than 1979's Circle X EP, wrote, "submerging energy in sloppy polyrhythms and echoey dub production, the album sometimes drags haphazardly and generally lacks its predecessor's field-plowing impact."

== Personnel ==
Circle X

- David Letendre – drums, percussion, guitar on "Current", album cover concept
- Rick Letendre – guitar, drums, percussion, tape operation, vocals, album cover concept
- Tony Pinotti – guitar, tape operation, vocals, bass guitar on "Current", album cover concept
- Bruce Witsiepe – guitar, tape operation, vocals, album cover concept

Additional personnel

- Jason Huang – Hammond organ on "Underworld"

Technical

- David Lichtenstein – engineering
