= Joelia =

Restaurant in Rotterdam, the Netherlands

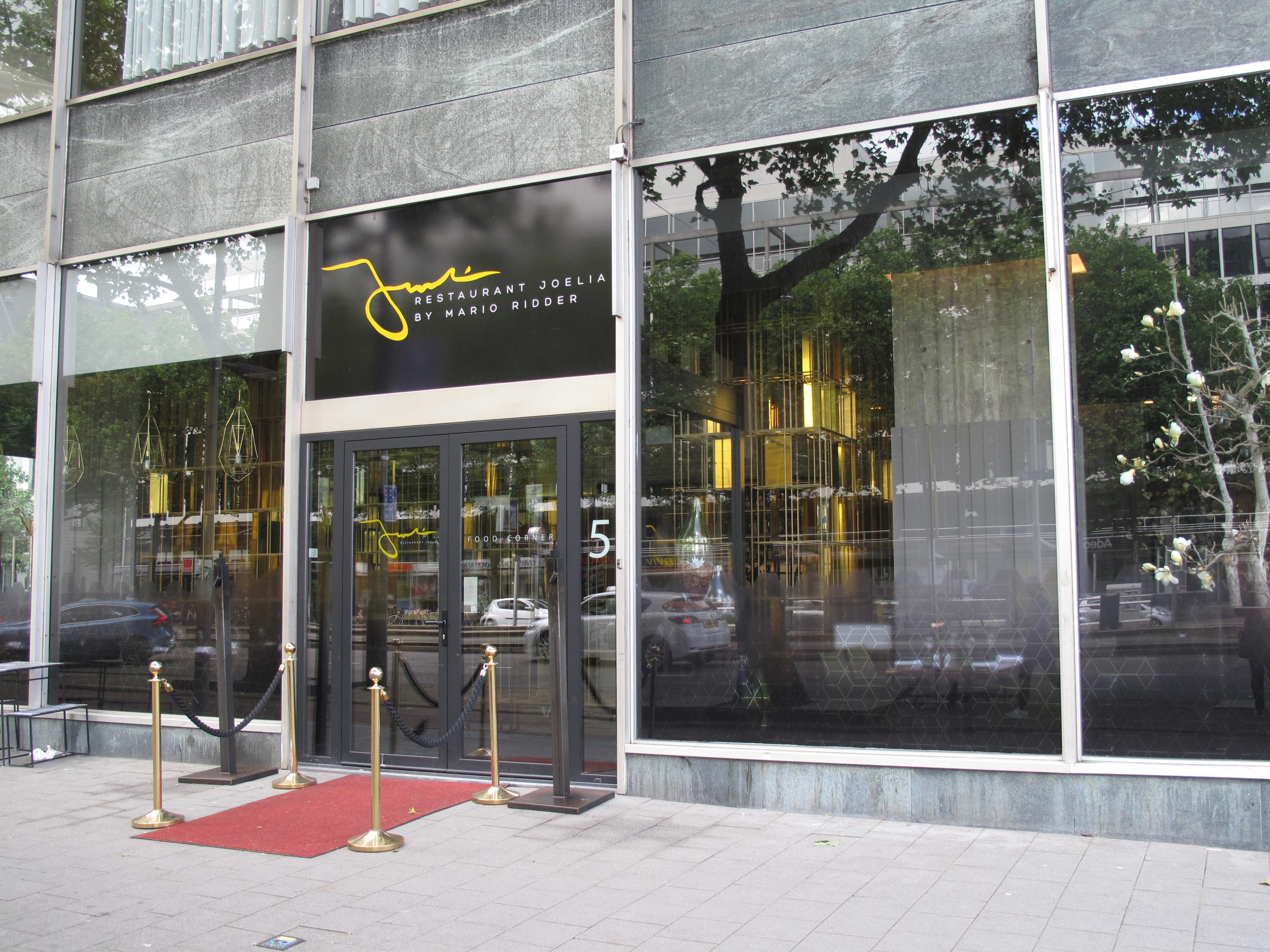
- Interactive map of Joelia

Restaurant information
- Established: 16 February 2015
- Head chef: Mario Ridder
- Location: Rotterdam, Netherlands
- Coordinates: 51.923706°N 4.477678°E
- Website: Official website

Joelia is a restaurant in Rotterdam, Netherlands. The restaurant received a Michelin star in 2016. The Dutch royal couple Willem-Alexander of the Netherlands and Queen Máxima of the Netherlands celebrated their fifteenth wedding anniversary in Joelia. During the corona pandemic, the restaurant devised a way to welcome diners despite the new corona rules for restaurants and cafes. For a tenner extra, they were registered as hotel guests of the Hilton Hotel located above. Guests could enter the one-star restaurant through the hotel lobby. It caused many negative reactions. It was then decided to keep the restaurant's doors closed for the next four weeks anyway. This decision was taken in consultation with the municipality of Rotterdam.

== See also ==
- List of restaurants in Rotterdam
