= Push (Sextile album) =

Studio album by Sextile
- Released: September 15, 2023
- Genres: Post-punk; dance
- Length: 34:38
- Label: Sacred Bones
- Producers: Panther Modern; Melissa Scaduto; Cameron Mitchell; Cesar Reyes

Sextile chronology
Albeit Living (2017)	Push (2023)	Yes, Please. (2025)

Push is the third studio album by American post-punk band Sextile. Released on September 15, 2023, by Sacred Bones Records, it is the band's first album after their reunion and death of their former member, Eddie Wuebben.

== Background and music ==
Following the death of former Sextile member Eddie Wuebben in 2019, the band took a hiatus, with band members Brady Keehn and Melissa Scaduto focusing on their side projects, Panther Modern and S. Product, respectively. Reuniting in 2022, the band released the single “Modern Weekend / Contortion” in 2022 and began recording Push after touring extensively. With the return of the former guitarist Cameron Michel, the album was partly recorded in Keehn's residence in Los Angeles and Yucca Valley. During this time, the band signed to Sacred Bones Records for the release of the album. The album was announced in July 2023, with the release of the single "New York" and its music video.

Described as a "crash of post-punk and dance music," Push places a greater emphasis on their electronic dance music influences than in earlier work. The album draws from the works of 90s electronic music artists such as Goldie, Josh Wink and Primal Scream, as well as punk artists such as Crass and Iggy Pop. Scaduto has cited The Haçienda-based records, Primal Scream's Screamadelica, Happy Mondays' Pills 'n' Thrills and Bellyaches and works of Underworld as primary influences on the album.

== Critical reception ==
Professional ratings
Review scores
Source	Rating
AllMusic	4/5 stars
Beats Per Minute	68/100

AllMusic critic Heather Phares gave a positive rating to the record, stating that "Sextile's first album for Sacred Bones proves that punk and electronic music can still sound dangerous and exciting when they're thrown together." Phares further stated that the band "moves from idea to idea so quickly the album sometimes sounds more like a collection of singles, but there are so many standout moments that it hardly matters." Ray Finlayson of Beats Per Minute was more mixed in his review of the album, writing: "It might be a blunt instrument they are wielding, and it might become wearisome sooner than you like, but Push does at least push its listener to the dancefloor for a short while – even if it feels like it’s through brute force alone."

== Track listing ==
Album track listing as adapted from Bandcamp. All songs written by Sextile.

1. "Contortion" — 3:11
2. "No Fun" — 2:55
3. "Crassy Mel" — 3:29
4. "Lost Myself Again" — 2:34
5. "Crash" — 4:43
6. "New York" — 3:34
7. "Basically Crazy" — 2:35
8. "Modern Weekend" — 3:20
9. "LA DJ" — 3:29
10. "Plastic" — 2:30
11. "Imposter" — 2:18

== Personnel ==
Album personnel as adapted from vinyl liner notes.

- Sextile — performer, recording
- Izzy Glaudini — vocals (5)
- Panther Modern — production
- Melissa Scaduto — production, art direction, design
- Cameron Mitchell — production
- Cesar Reyes — production
- Maurizio Baggio — mastering
- Sarah Pardini — photography
