= Celeste =

Celeste may refer to:

== Geography ==
- Mount Celeste, unofficial name of a mountain on Vancouver Island, British Columbia, Canada
- Celeste, Texas, a rural city in North Texas
  - Celeste High School, public high school located in the city of Celeste, Texas
- Celeste Lake, Bolivia
- Celeste River, Costa Rica
- Celeste Center, a multipurpose arena in Columbus, Ohio

== Film, books and games ==
- Céleste (1970 film), a French-Italian comedy film
- Céleste (1980 film), a German film about the life of Marcel Proust
- Celeste (2018 film), an Australian film
- Celeste, a 2004 novel in the Gemini series of V. C. Andrews novels, ghostwritten by Andrew Neiderman
- Celeste (video game), a 2018 platforming video game
  - Celeste 64: Fragments of the Mountain, a 2024 platforming video game and sequel to Celeste

== Music ==
- Celeste (singer), American-born British singer-songwriter
- Celeste Cruz, half of American pop duo Daphne and Celeste
- Celeste Johnson, professionally known as Celeste, American performer in Italy
- Celeste (band), a metal band from Lyon, France
- Celeste (album), a 2012 album by My Tiger My Timing
- "Celeste" (song), a 2012 Italian-language song by Laura Pausini
- "Celeste", a song by Donovan from the album Sunshine Superman
- Celesta, a musical instrument also known as a celeste
- Celeste pedal, a type of pedal on some early pianos
- Voix céleste (French: 'heavenly voice'), a pipe organ stop

== Other uses ==
- Celeste (name), a list of people with the given name or surname
- Celeste (LEO-PNT), planned navigation low-earth-orbit satellite constellation
- Celeste (color), a pale turquoise shade of blue
- Celeste (frozen pizza), brand of frozen pizza owned by Pinnacle Foods and widely referred to as Mama Celeste
- Céleste (restaurant), a former Michelin-starred restaurant in London hotel The Lanesborough
- Coven Celeste, a Wiccan coven
- Mitsubishi Celeste, a Japanese car
- Tropical Storm Celeste, tropical cyclones named Celeste

== See also ==
- Celestia (name)
