= Amarone (restaurant) =

Coordinates: 51°55′21.24″N 4°29′1.34″E

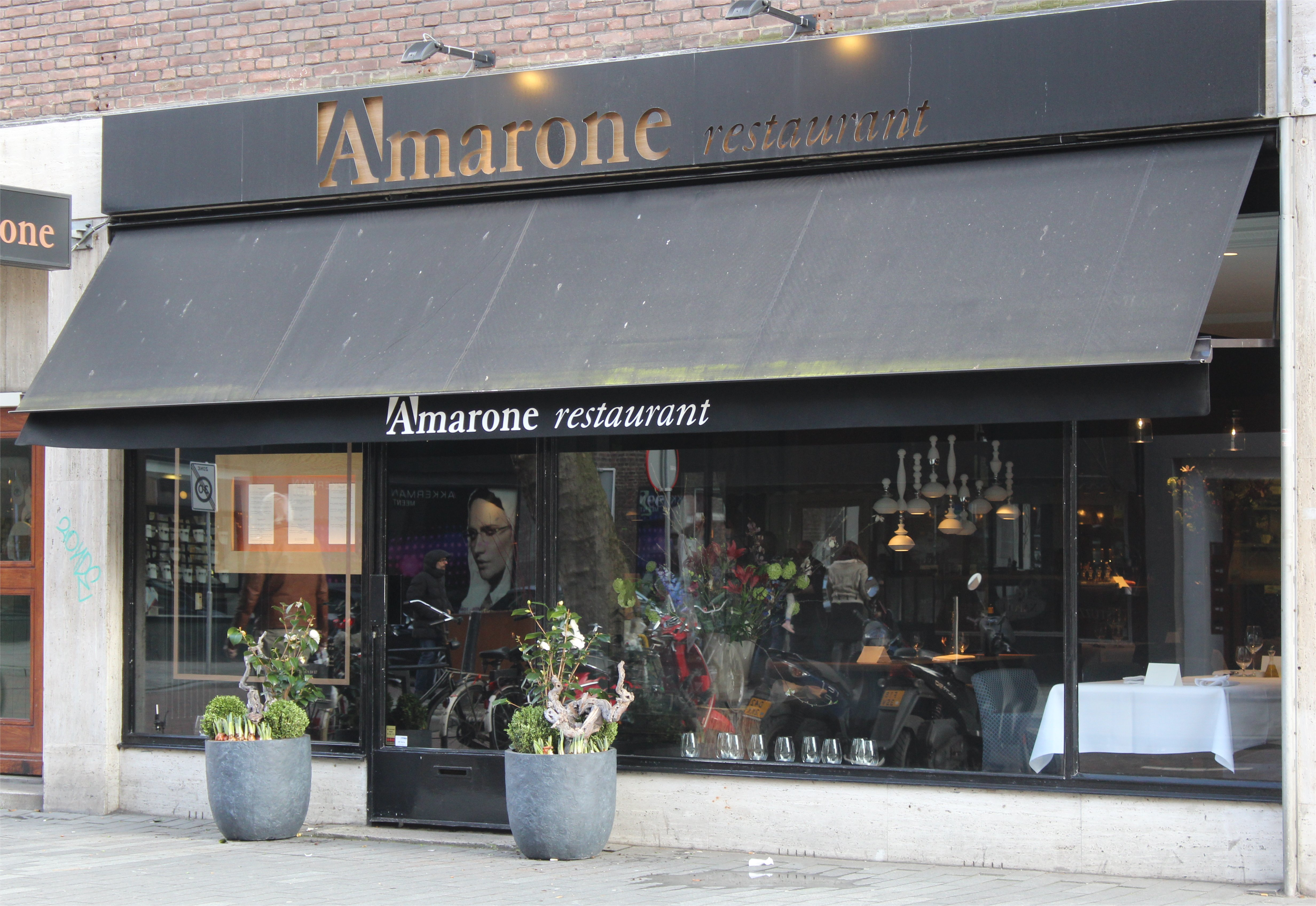
- Amarone Restaurant (Rotterdam)
- Interactive map of Amarone

Restaurant information
- Established: September 2006
- Head chef: Jan van Dobben
- Food type: French with Japanese influence
- Rating: Michelin Guide
- Location: Meent 72a, Rotterdam, 3011 JN, Netherlands
- Seating capacity: 50
- Website: Official website

Amarone is a restaurant in Rotterdam, Netherlands. It is a fine dining restaurant that is awarded one Michelin star in the period 2008–present.

The original head chef of Amarone was Gert Blom. Chef Blom and maître Harry Baas were co-owners of the restaurant from 2006 until Baas left in 2015. Present owner and head chef of Amarone is Jan van Dobben. Chef van Dobben worked together with Gert Blom for six years and became the co-owner of the restaurant in 2017. A year later, in July 2018, he completely took over the restaurant from Mr Blom. Chef van Dobben, together with his wife, Yoshiko Takayama-van Dobben, restaurant-manager Jasper Verhagen and sous-chef Yuri Wattimena, retained his Michelin-star in December 2018.

GaultMillau awarded the restaurant in 2019 with 15 out of 20 points.

In 2019, Restaurant Amarone situated on the 60th place in the "Lekker 500"

On August 22, 2019, Amarone had to close its doors after a major fire. There was a short circuit in a wall socket in the basement. After a renovation, the restaurant reopened on February 21, 2020.

== See also ==
- List of Michelin starred restaurants in the Netherlands
