= Celestial (Circle X album) =

Studio album by Circle X
- Released: August 3, 1994
- Genres: Art rock, noise, experimental
- Length: 57:35
- Label: Matador
- Producer: Circle X

Professional ratings
Review scores
| Source | Rating |
|---|---|
| Allmusic | 4/5 stars |

Celestial is the second and final full-length studio album by Circle X, released in 1994.

After experimenting and releasing EPs for more than a decade, Celestial marked the band's first major release since Prehistory in 1983.

Celestial is regarded as "showcasing the diverse, honed ideas in an impressive cycle of thought-provoking bludgeons and sublime dirges", and "Circle X made it seem like no wave never went away."

The album would be the last album by Circle X, due to the death of founding member and guitarist Bruce Witsiepe from HIV complications in 1995.

== Track listing ==
1. "Kyoko" - 7:35
2. "Pulley" - 3:55
3. "Crow's Ghost" - 8:27
4. "Gothic Fragment" - 3:49
5. "Some Things Don't Grow Back" - 4:32
6. "Tell My Horse" - 3:34
7. "Hardcases (Big Picture)" - 3:33
8. "Cabin 9 Dub" - 3:44
9. "Waxed Fruit" - 4:58
10. "Little Celestial Poet" - 12:21
11. "They Come Prancing" - 1:07

== Credits ==
- Artwork By [Typography] - Raquel Shapira
- Bass, Keyboards - Rik Letendre
- Drums - Martin Köb
- Mastered By - Ray Janos
- Photography [Disc Photo] - Lamonte Young
- Producer - Circle X
- Recorded By, Producer - Mike Pullen*
- Guitars, Voice, Tape, Photography [Front And Back Cover], Artwork By [Graphic Design] - Bruce Witsiepe
- Voice, Synthesizer, Tape - Tony Pinotti
