= Celeste Mountjoy =

Australian artist

Celeste Mountjoy a.k.a. "Filthyratbag" is a contemporary Australian artist and illustrator whose art incorporates themes of feminism, mental health, and the realities of womanhood.

Mountjoy has been creating art since she was a toddler. Her earliest art journal dates from when she was four years old. Since moving out of home at the age of 17, her art has been her full-time job. By age 19 she had acquired a following online, and she has exhibited her works in galleries across the world.

Her art is a combination of both illustrations and stories. It often takes a satirical approach, commenting on the behaviour of modern society.

== Exhibitions ==
- I've been to paradise but I've never been to me.
- 10 Reasons Why Aurora Campbell & Celeste Mountjoy Are Pathetic.
