= Celeste De Blasis =

American historical romance writer

- Celeste De Blasis in November 1988
- Born: Celeste Ninette De Blasis; May 8, 1946; Santa Monica, California
- Died: April 13, 2001 (aged 54); Victorville, California
- Occupation: Novelist
- Writing career
- Pen name: Celeste DeBlasis, Celeste De Blasis, Celeste N. De Blasis
- Period: 1968–1991
- Genre: Romance
- Notable work: Wild Swan

Celeste De Blasis (May 8, 1946 – April 13, 2001) was a prominent American author of historical romance novels.

== Early life and education ==
Celeste Ninette De Blasis was born on May 8, 1946, in Santa Monica, California, to Raymond “Ray” De Blasis (1916–1985) and Jean Campbell (1920–2012). Her grandparents were Kemper Bramwell Campbell (1881-1957) and Litta Belle Hibben (1886-1980).

De Blasis grew up at the Kemper Campbell Ranch in Victorville, California, with her family. She attended public schools in Victorville. She graduated from Victor Valley Senior High School in 1964.

In September 1964, De Blasis enrolled at Wellesley College in Wellesley, Massachusetts, as an English Literature major. She attended for one year, then transferred to Oregon State University. She later transferred to Pomona College in Claremont, California, where she graduated in 1968. She later said that her longing to be back home at the ranch had drawn her home to complete her education.

While in college, she was diagnosed with lupus, which may have affected her decision to move closer to home.

=== The Kemper Campbell Ranch ===
The historic Kemper Campbell Ranch is a 180-acre private estate and working cattle ranch located in a secluded part of Victorville, California. On an oasis in the Mojave River Valley, the ranch includes Joshua Trees, desert succulents, green pastures, boulder formations, the Mojave River, and its surrounding cottonwood forest, all against a mountain backdrop.

Situated near Los Angeles, this historic property hosted Hollywood figures like Greta Garbo and John Wayne. It was where Herman Mankiewicz drafted the Citizen Kane screenplay, a story later featured in the Netflix movie Mank.

De Blasis said, "It was a marvelous place to grow up, providing the freedom of the country on the one hand, a variety of guests and the entertainment (concerts, dances, poetry readings and good conversation) offered on the other. My brother David and I and my three cousins were invited to participate in every activity as long as we were polite to the guests." Throughout her life, De Blasis referred to the ranch as her home.

== Development of an author ==
De Blasis recalled that there were books everywhere at the ranch, and the children were encouraged to read from an early age. "My grandmother taught all of the grandchildren to read long before we went to school. For each new word we recognized, we had the choice of a penny or candy."

"I have been writing since I was very young, but none of it was the product of a child prodigy. The poems were full of forced rhymes, the daily journals were never daily for more than three days at a time, the short stories presented images of a world far more ordered than anything involving human beings could ever be." "I wrote the exciting parts of a novel when I was 12, and I passed it around to friends. I didn't bother with the connecting parts."

"Almost everything I've read at some time in my life has come into play in my work", said De Blasis in a 1984 interview. She also expressed admiration for Herman Wouk, Howard Fast, James A. Michener, Taylor Caldwell, and Kurt Vonnegut. In 1975, she listed Mary Stewart (novelist), Eleanor Alice Burford (whose pen name is Victoria Holt), Dorothy Eden, Phyllis A. Whitney, Anne Stevenson, and Barbara Mertz (whose pen name is Barbara Michaels) as her favorite women authors.

Following her college graduation in 1968, De Blasis spent several years working as a receptionist, sales clerk, and legal secretary, all while feeling a calling to become a writer. "I knew I wanted to write. I know there are people who can hold down a job all day and then come home and write, but I am not one of them. I knew that if I ever wanted to write a novel, I would have to do nothing but write." Her parents saw her struggle and offered to help. "I was lucky to get the chance. In 1974 my parents let me live with them for a year so I could write The Night Child."

== Publication and success ==
De Blasis was published in a number of poetry magazines in the 1960s, including Manifold (London), Kauri, and Sandcutters. In 1969, she was given the Southern Division National League of Pen Women Award for Letters for her poetry.

Her debut novel, The Night Child, was published in 1975 to positive reviews, establishing her in the Gothic mystery genre. This was a bittersweet success, as the manuscript was finished and sent to her agent a week before her brother died. "When I told my brother, he assured me that he knew the manuscript would be a book. I wish he had lived to share my joy."

The Night Child was followed in 1976 with Suffer a Sea Change. Reviews were mixed for De Blasis' second novel. Overall, the positive reviews outweighed the negative.

== Public debate on religious freedom ==
In April 1976, De Blasis and local resident Len J. Santi engaged in a public debate over the relationship between religious conviction and American law within the pages of the Victorville Daily Press. Santi, a native of Brooklyn, New York, resided in Victorville, California, for twenty years, working as a construction programmer at George Air Force Base and serving as the leader of the local Christian Businessmen Committee. Throughout his residency, he was a regular contributor of opinion columns to the Daily Press, the primary newspaper serving the Victor Valley region. By contrast, Celeste published only a single opinion piece in the newspaper.

On April 7, 1976, Santi published a column presenting a series of grievances regarding contemporary American society, criticizing the government for turning away from religion. Santi wrote, "I am entitled as a Christian, who also claims to have had a personal relationship with God through Jesus Christ, to present my viewpoint to all of our American people." Addressing the 1976 presidential election candidates, Jimmy Carter and Gerald Ford, he stated, "I am not a Carter man as yet, but if he is the only one who outwardly stands as God’s witness who will promote laws that will stand within the guideline of the 10 commandments, he will definitely get my Christian and American vote."

In response to Santi's column, De Blasis published a counter-opinion on April 12, 1976, titled "Ideological Plague". She critiqued his stance, writing, "I won’t argue with Mr. Santi's claim to have a pipeline to God. If that is his comfort in the universe, he is welcome to it. The danger in the man lies in his insistence that his pipeline carries the word for all." Drawing on historical examples of religious persecution, De Blasis argued that American legal frameworks protect pluralism: "We may worship where we wish, whom we wish, when we wish, as long as we do not injure others. We may be believers or non-believers. Our government will not consider either of these states as an offense. We will not be imprisoned, tortured, beheaded or burned at the stake for either choice." She concluded by warning that individuals sharing Santi's viewpoint would willingly surrender constitutional liberties "for the least chance that their own particular cult might become the law."

== The Proud Breed and The Tiger's Woman ==
With her third book, The Proud Breed, published in 1978, De Blasis wrote about the pride of being a Californian. In an interview, Celeste stated, “Writing The Proud Breed is something I'd thought about for a long time.” To write The Proud Breed, De Blasis “worked 18 hours a day for two years” until she completed the manuscript to her satisfaction. The reviews confirmed that De Blasis' hard work was worthwhile. According to one reviewer, “This is the perfect book for lovers of California History.”

Robin Updike pointed out in a 1978 interview that De Blasis shared a strong physical resemblance with her newest heroine, specifically citing the Mediterranean traits she inherited from her Italian father. De Blasis responded, “It's very flattering to be compared to Tessa” the heroine of The Proud Breed. Celeste's novel, The Proud Breed, was a huge success and sold 900,000 copies. At age 32, De Blasis was now a flourishing novelist who, after publishing three books, earned enough to support her writing habit. De Blasis' next novel was The Tiger's Woman, published in 1981. Celeste described writing her new novel as intense. “For my kind of books, the characters are so enormously important and so real to me that you can't do them at ten-minute intervals. You live with these people like your family.”

== The Wild Swan Trilogy ==
De Blasis discovered her love for historical fiction while writing The Proud Breed. She quickly learned that the genre is difficult to master, demanding a rare combination of distinct skills. De Blasis said in a 1984 interview, “People know that if I say it rained (on a particular day generations ago), it rained.” De Blasis continued, “If you love history, and you read a novel that's highly inaccurate, it ruins it.” Her next novel, Wild Swan, included a mix of family elements. “Some of the family history came from discussions with my grandmother. But I don't want people to get the idea that it's a family autobiography.” De Blasis explained, “I just used that as a starting point. Some of my ancestors on my grandmother's side began as smugglers in England and later became respectable horse breeders in the United States.”

At the time of the 1984 interview in August, De Blasis had nearly completed work on the Wild Swan sequel, Swan's Chance, which was published in 1985. Swan's Chance was followed by A Season of Swans, the final book in the Wild Swan trilogy, Published in 1989. De Blasis conducts thorough on-site research and archival digging to recreate her settings. This meticulous detail shines in the Wild Swan trilogy, where she used historical track records to piece together horse races—even matching the exact weather—while substituting the original winner with her novel's thoroughbred. Commercial success brought sudden fame. Mail-order clerks would shriek in recognition over the phone, and the intrusion peaked when out-of-town fans parked an RV outside her home, expecting a visit. Unsettled by the lack of boundaries, De Blasis began taking her privacy much more seriously.

== Graveyard Peaches ==
In a departure from her successful novels, De Blasis published Graveyard Peaches, a non-fiction memoir, in 1991. “The book is about the ranch," said De Blasis, referring to the Kemper Campbell Ranch in Victorville, California. It's “about growing up on it in a way that was in many respects more reminiscent of the nineteenth century than of the twentieth.” De Blasis stated, “The ranch was a part of my childhood. A special place. Special places are disappearing in California, especially in Southern California.”

== Final years ==
De Blasis continued to write throughout the 1990s, though health issues disrupted her intense work ethic, which previously demanded up to 18-hour days. Simultaneously, she faced friction from publishers who favored rapidly produced, assembly-line books or were constantly searching for the next novelty. “It's a tough, tough business now,” she said referring to publishers. “They want authors who produce one to two books a year. You as readers are denied a lot of good books because of that.” In 1997, a severe lupus flare-up forced De Blasis to halt her work. Characteristically, her only complaint was, “Too much time wasted in doctors’ offices.”

On April 13, 2001, Celeste De Blasis died in her home at the age of 54. De Blasis died of cancer. After her cremation, De Blasis' ashes were spread by family members along her preferred walking trail at the Kemper Campbell Ranch, a path she had traveled nearly every day.

== Posthumous publication ==
Years after De Blasis' passing, her family discovered several unpublished manuscripts among her belongings. Consequently, the Estate of Celeste De Blasis partnered with digital publisher Bookouture to reissue her classic trilogy and release her final writings.

On August 5, 2020, Bookouture officially announced the acquisition of the rights to these two specific trilogies, rather than her entire literary portfolio. Under this agreement, the publisher committed to releasing her renowned Wild Swan trilogy in digital format for the first time. As part of this digital relaunch, the original Wild Swan novels were retitled A Wild Heart, A Wild Faith, and A Wild Hope.

Additionally, Bookouture secured the rights to publish her final, previously unreleased trilogy, America’s Daughter. Representatives from the publishing house noted that participating in the debut of this monumental final work was a historic opportunity. Set during the American Revolutionary War, the America’s Daughter series delivers her signature sweeping historical romance alongside cameo appearances by Alexander Hamilton and George Washington.

== Legacy and influence ==
Celeste's 1978 California historical epic, The Proud Breed, left a lasting impact on future historical fiction writers. Western romance novelist Rosanne Bittner explicitly credits the novel with igniting her passion to write about pioneers and the American West. During a 1992 interview, Bittner noted that De Blasis' work inspired her to start writing. Reflecting on The Proud Breed, Bittner recalled, "I loved it and decided to write a book". At the time she began her authorship—which eventually led to her successful novel Song of the Wolf—Bittner was employed as a secretary at a nuclear power plant. Discussing her reading habits, Bittner stated, "I don't read romances. I prefer bigger books – big historical sagas." Emulating De Blasis' methodology, Bittner travels extensively for her research to anchor her narratives around actual historical events.

== Mojave Narrows Park Memorial Garden ==
On Earth Day, April 22, 2026, a memorial garden honoring De Blasis was opened at the Mojave Narrows Regional Park in Victorville, California. Growing up together on the Kemper Campbell Ranch bordering Mojave Narrows Park, Scott Campbell and his brothers shared a close bond with their cousin, Celeste. During her tribute, Scott fondly recalled her bold spirit: "She was suitably devious and fearless in capture the flag, and right there with the boys defending or attacking forts we had dug in the hills." Celeste deeply loved the ranch and the neighboring park, often spending hours taking long walks along the Mojave River.

== Bibliography ==
=== Novels ===
- The Night Child (1975), Coward, McCann & Geoghegan ISBN 0-698-10632-6
- Suffer a Sea Change (1976), Coward, McCann & Geoghegan ISBN 0-698-10708-X
- The Proud Breed (1978), Coward, McCann & Geoghegan ISBN 0-698-10870-1 – A three-generational saga of California.

==== Wild Swan Trilogy ====
- Wild Swan (1984), ISBN 0-553-05059-1 (Book 1)
- Swan's Chance (1985), ISBN 0-553-05092-3 (Book 2)
- A Season of Swans (1989), ISBN 0-553-05362-0 (Book 3)

==== America's Daughter Trilogy ====
- America's Daughter (2021), Bookouture ISBN 1-80019-326-2 (Book 1)
- America's Wife (2021), Bookouture ISBN 1-80019-328-9 (Book 2)
- America's Promise (2021), Bookouture ISBN 1-80019-330-0 (Book 3)

=== Memoirs ===
- Graveyard Peaches: A California Memoir (1991), St. Martin's Press ISBN 0-312-06362-8
