= Fitzgerald (restaurant) =

Restaurant in Rotterdam, the Netherlands

Coordinates: 51.919081°N 4.490002°E

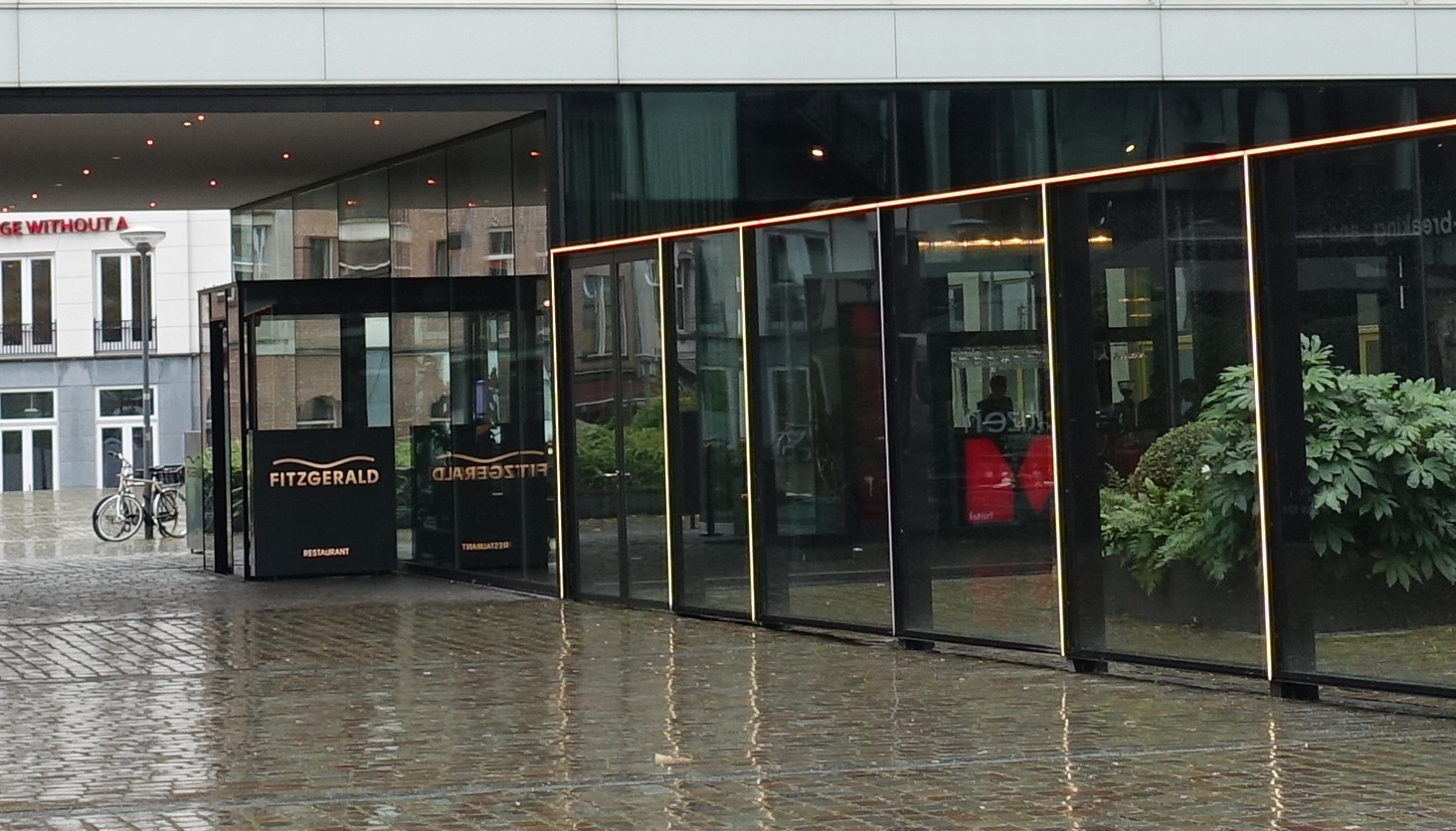
- Interactive map of Fitzgerald

Restaurant information
- Established: 2015
- Head chef: Michael Verhagen
- Food type: Modern French
- Location: Rotterdam, Netherlands
- Website: Official website

Fitzgerald is a restaurant in Rotterdam, the Netherlands. The restaurant was opened in March 2015 by Danny Gonzalez. The restaurant holds a Michelin star which it received in 2018. The restaurant serves modern French cuisine, with Michael Verhagen as head chef.

== See also ==
- List of French restaurants
- List of restaurants in Rotterdam
