= Celestia (disambiguation) =

Celestia is a free astronomy computer program.

Celestia may also refer to:

== Games ==
- Mount Celestia, a fictional place in the Dungeons & Dragons role-playing game
- Celestia, a planet in Eternia in Tales of Eternia, a Namco video game
- Celestia, a region in Genshin Impact
- Celestia, a world in Disgaea: Hour of Darkness

== Other ==
- Celestia (name), a person's given name
- Celestia (band), a black metal band from Avignon, France
- 1252 Celestia, a Main-belt asteroid
- Nation of Celestial Space aka Celestia, a micronation created by James Thomas Mangan
- Celestia, an Adventist Christian commune established near Laporte, Pennsylvania in the mid-19th century
- Princess Celestia (voiced by Nicole Oliver), a character in the TV show My Little Pony: Friendship Is Magic

== See also ==
- Celesta
- Celestial (disambiguation)
