= FG (restaurant) =

Coordinates: 51°54′8.46″N 4°27′40.16″E

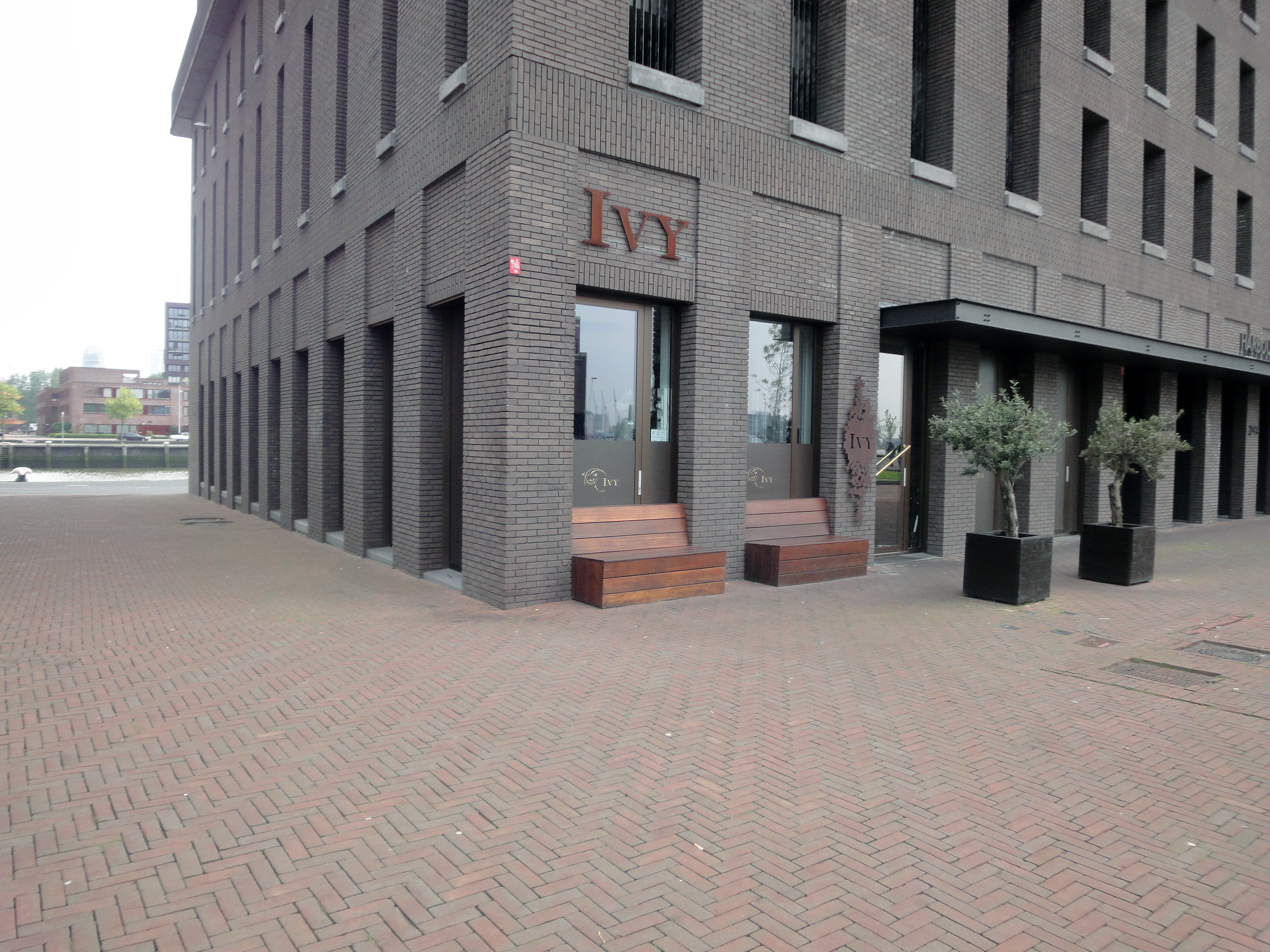
- FG when it was still named Ivy
- Interactive map of FG

Restaurant information
- Established: 2009
- Head chef: François Geurds
- Food type: French
- Rating: Michelin Guide
- Location: Katshoek 37-b, Rotterdam, 3032 AE, Netherlands
- Seating capacity: 60
- Website: Official website

FG (formerly Ivy) is a restaurant in Rotterdam, Netherlands. It is a fine dining restaurant that was awarded one Michelin star for the period 2010–2013, and two stars since 2014.

GaultMillau awarded the restaurant 17.5 out of 20 points.

Head chef of FG is François Geurds, who opened the restaurant in 2009. Geurds, formerly a sous chef in The Fat Duck of Heston Blumenthal, uses Molecular gastronomy in his kitchen.

== Name dispute ==
Due to a lost court case with Caprice Holding, owner of the European trademark for the name The Ivy, Geurds was forced to change the name of his restaurant. Geurds' argumentation that The Ivy and Ivy only served their local markets in respectively London and Rotterdam, were dismissed by the judge. The new name of the restaurant became FG and was unveiled on 13 June 2013.

== Gadgets ==
- The restaurant possesses an espresso machine with foot-control. In 2011, it was the first time ever the manufacturer made a custom-made machine with foot-control.
- The restaurants has a "fragrance table" in the kitchen. The chef's table can spread 30 different flavours. According to the restaurant to promote the taste process.

== Location ==
Originally, the restaurant was located at the Lloydstraat 294 in Rotterdam. In 2016 is moved to Katshoek 37-b in Rotterdam, the former site of the FG Noodle Bar, next to FG Food Labs.

== See also ==
- List of Michelin starred restaurants in the Netherlands
