= Celeste Tanfani =

Italian artist

Francesca Celeste Tanfani was an Italian pastellist active between 1735 and 1737.

Little is known of Tanfani, but she is known to have shown two portraits at the San Luca exhibition of 1737. She may have married Cosimo Braccini, as his tomb bears an inscription referring to his wife Celeste Tanfani and several children. Two pieces, a portrait of a gentleman and a copy of a self-portrait by Rembrandt, were recorded in the Uffizi inventory of 1890.
