= Black Smoke (restaurant) =

Restaurant in Rotterdam and Antwerp

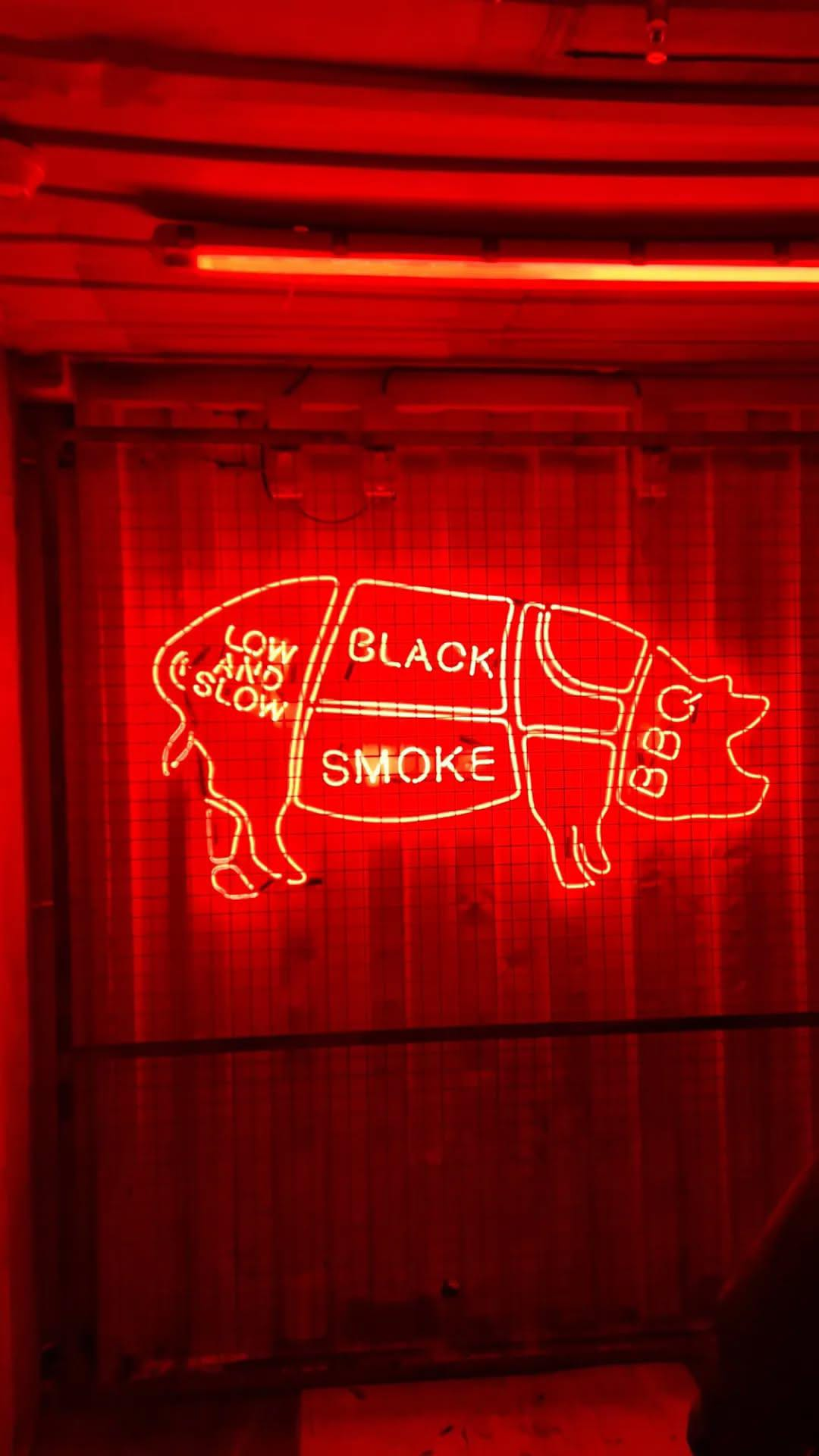
- Entrance corridor to the Black Smoke restaurant in Rotterdam.

Restaurant information
- Established: 2016: Antwerp; 2019: Rotterdam
- Owners: Jord Althuizen, Kasper Stuart
- Location: Antwerp, Rotterdam, Belgium, the Netherlands
- Seating capacity: Rotterdam: 160 people inside, 200 people outside
- Website: blacksmoke.be blacksmoke.nl

Black Smoke is a barbecue restaurant in Antwerp (Belgium) and Rotterdam (the Netherlands).

== History ==
Black Smoke is a barbecue restaurant chain founded by Dutch BBQ expert Jord Althuizen and Belgian entrepreneur Kasper Stuart. The first location opened in 2016 in Antwerp, situated in the former fermentation hall of the De Koninck Brewery. The second location debuted in 2019 in Rotterdam, housed within the former fire station of the monumental Van Nelle Factory, a UNESCO World Heritage Site since 2014.

The location in Rotterdam is 1,100 square metres (12,000 sq ft) and has a capacity of 160 people inside and 200 people outside.

== Cuisine ==
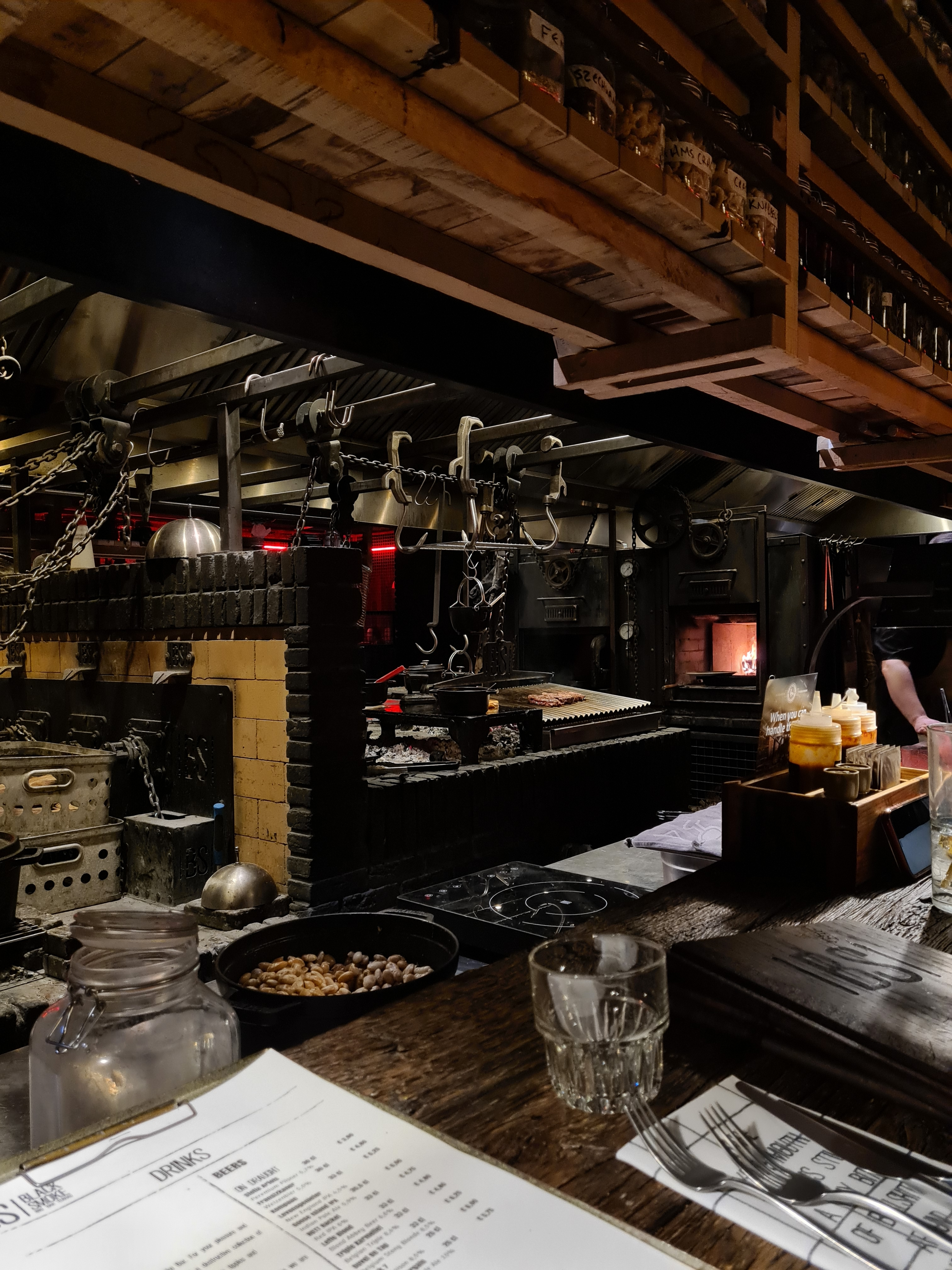
The open kitchen of the Black Smoke restaurant located in Rotterdam.

The kitchen includes Yankee-style “low & slow” barbecue cooked in smokers imported from the United States, as well as “hot & fast” assado-style South American barbecue. Additionally, it contains tandoori clay ovens for preparing traditional Indian naan bread and a Japanese hibachi grill for Asian-style barbecue.

The venue also includes a chef's table for up to twenty guests, overlooking the section of the kitchen where asado crosses, wood-fired rotisserie grills, and parillas are used. The South American parilla consists of a V-shaped grate suspended above glowing embers of wood and charcoal. Black Smoke pitmasters prepare cuts of meat live in front of the guests, including whole pigs, lambs, and goats.

== See also ==
- List of restaurants in Rotterdam
