= Van Brienenoord Bridge =

Bridge in Rotterdam, Netherlands

Coordinates: 51°54′14″N 4°32′33″E

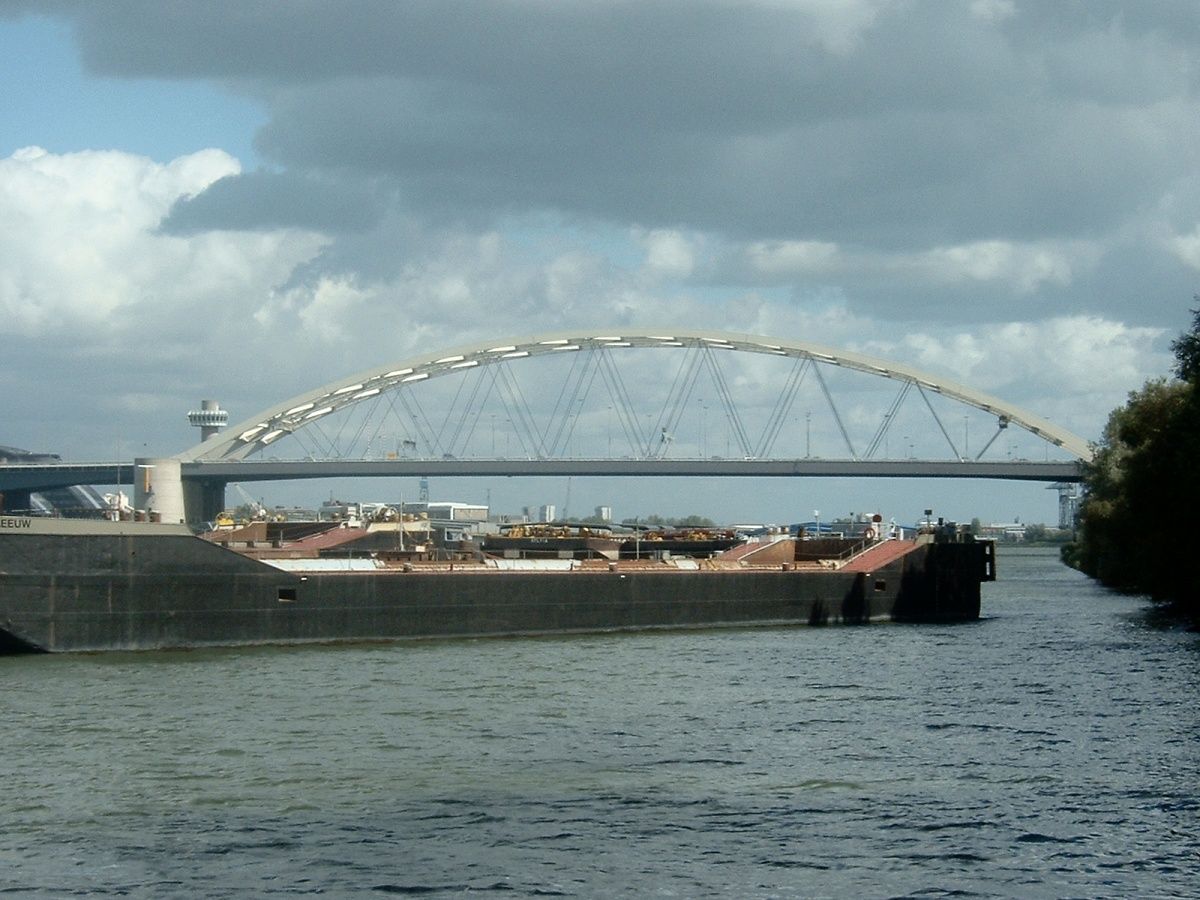
The Van Brienenoord Bridge, seen from the west, with a barge in front. The bascule bridges are on the far left

The Van Brienenoord Bridge (Dutch: Van Brienenoordbrug) is a large twin tied-arch motorway bridge in the Netherlands. Located at the east side of Rotterdam, it crosses the New Meuse (Nieuwe Maas), a major distributary of the river Rhine. The bridge actually consists of two separate, parallel, and (visually) almost identical arch-bridges, as well as a set of three parallel bascule bridges on the north end.
The bridge carries 12 lanes of traffic of the A16 motorway, the busiest highway in the Netherlands. Additionally, on the outside of the east arch, a two-way segregated cycling bridge has been mounted.
Including lead-up ramps, the Van Brienenoord Bridge is 1320 meters long and vessels with up to 24 meters air draft can pass under the closed bridge. With a span of 300 meters, it is the longest span road bridge in the Netherlands.

Traffic exceeds 235,000 vehicles crossing the bridge daily, using four 3-lane carriageways, in an express versus local / distributor arrangement.

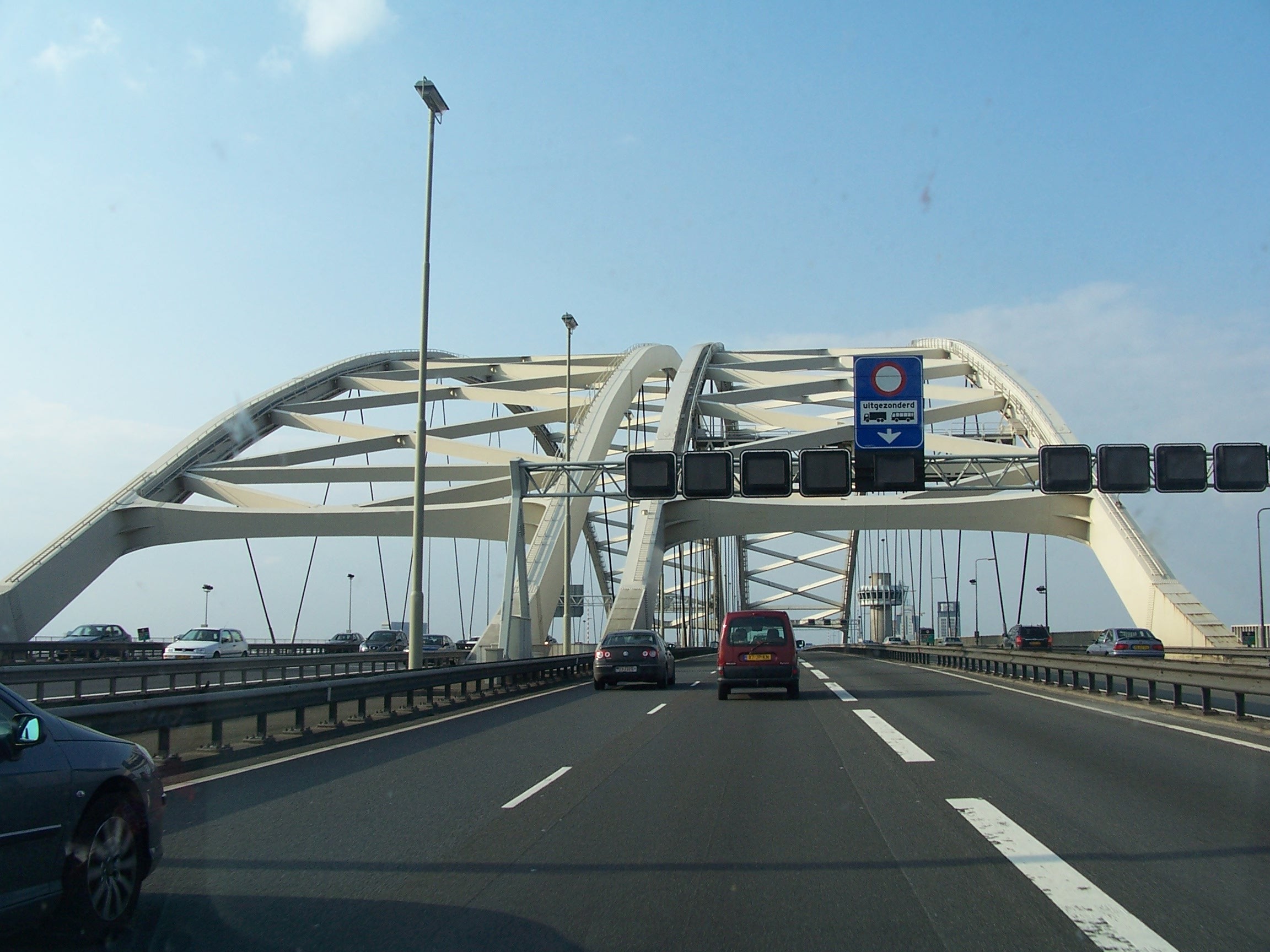
View of the twin bridge from the south; the bridge on the right is 25 years older than the other. Each bridge arch carries two roadways – the inner with three lanes of express traffic; and an outer with another three local / distributor lanes.

== History ==
The east arch (287.5 m long) was built in 1965, constituting the original Van Brienenoord Bridge. In 1990 the bridge received a major upgrade, by the addition of a second, almost identical arch (305 m long and slightly broader) to the west, doubling the traffic capacity.

The bridge is named after the Eiland van Brienenoord (Isle of Brienenoord) in the river, on which some of its pillars are built. The little island was named after its former owner, baron Arnoud Willem van Brienen van de Groote Lindt in 1847. The Dutch suffix oord means a place.

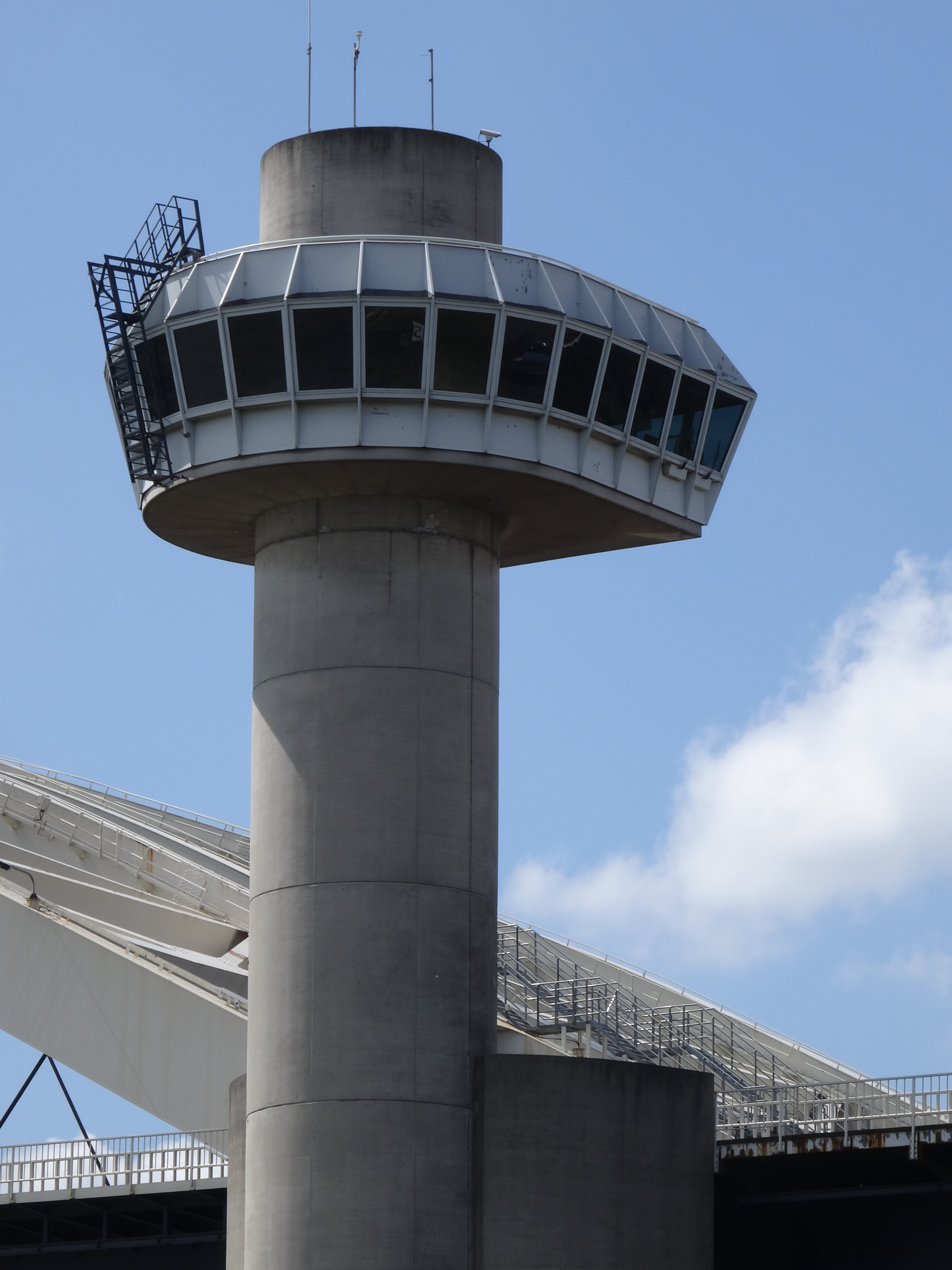
The bridge operator's house and radar on the north-east corner are defunct since 2005

An average of 150.000 ships pass the bridge every year. Approximately 500 of these ships require the bridge to be opened, a process which takes 18 minutes total. Stopping road traffic and opening the bridge takes 4 minutes; ship passage, 10 minutes; and closing the bridge another 4 minutes. During this time, road traffic is blocked by boom barriers. As of November 2005, the bridge is no longer controlled locally but from the nearby city of Rhoon, by the region's Road Traffic Control.
A request to open the bridge for ship traffic must be made with harbor authorities at least three hours in advance.

An electro-mechanical failure on 17 March 2006 left the bridge open for about an hour, in mid-day, causing traffic jams up to seven kilometres. Engineers closed the western bridge first, restoring traffic to Breda. The eastern bridge was closed at approximately 1 AM, restoring traffic to The Hague and Utrecht. On 5 November 2006 it failed to close again, this time due to an electrical failure, forcing engineers to close the bridge manually.
