= Celestial =

Celestial may refer to:

== Science ==
- Objects or events seen in the sky and the following astronomical terms:
  - Astronomical object, a naturally occurring physical entity, association, or structure that exists in the observable universe
  - Celestia, a 3D astronomy program that allows users to travel through the universe, also known as a celestial body or object
  - Celestial coordinate system, a system for mapping positions on the celestial sphere
  - Celestial mechanics, the branch of astronomy that deals with the motions of celestial objects
  - Celestial navigation, a position-fixing technique that helps sailors cross the oceans
  - Celestial pole, the two points in the sky, north and south, where the projection of a planet's axis of rotation intersects its celestial sphere
  - Celestial sphere, an imaginary sphere concentric with the Earth – all objects in the sky can be thought of as projected upon the celestial sphere
  - Celestial spheres, fundamental entities of the cosmological models developed by Plato, Aristotle, and others

== Music ==
- Celestial (Circle X album), the final full-length studio album by Circle X released in 1994
- Celestial (Isis album), the first full-length album by Isis released in 2000
- Celestial (RBD album), the third Spanish studio album by Mexican Latin pop group RBD
  - "Celestial" (RBD song), a song from the above album
  - Celestial (Versão Brasil), the Portuguese version of the album
- "Celestial" (Ed Sheeran song), a 2022 song by Ed Sheeran
- Celestial Recordings, a record label from 1998 to 2002
- Celestiial, a one-man funeral doom metal band from Minnesota
- "Celestial", a song by P.O.D. from Satellite
- "The Celestials" (song), the first single off the 2012 Smashing Pumpkins album Oceania
- Celestial (Rob Halford album), a studio album by Rob Halford
- "No Celestial," a song by Le Sserafim from Antifragile (EP), 2022

== Television ==
- Celestial Digimon, used in Digimon Frontier, a TV series first broadcast in 2002
- Celestial Movies, a 24-hour satellite broadcast movie channel
- Celestial Maidens (Tennyo), are known in the 2005 miniseries Ceres, Celestial Legend, with the title character being one such divine/angelic being who has been reborn as sixteen-year-old Mikage Aya

== Animal kingdom ==
- Celestial Eye, a breed of goldfish related to the Telescope eye
- Celestial Parrotlet (Forpus coelestis), also known as Pacific Parrotlet and Lesson's Parrotlet

== Games and comics ==
- August Celestials, the four wild gods in World of Warcraft: Mists of Pandaria
- Celestial (comics), a race of powerful alien beings in Marvel Comics
- Celestials (Dungeons & Dragons), a category of angel-like beings in the Dungeons & Dragons game
- Celestial Brush, in the video game Ōkami
- Celestials, a class consisting of 12 monsters from the game My Singing Monsters

== Spirituality and religion ==
- Body of light, also referred to as the celestial body, a "quasi material" aspect of the human body, neither solely physical nor spiritual
- Celestial Church of Christ, an African-initiated church founded 1947 in Benin
- Related to Heaven
  - Celestial kingdom, the highest of three heavens or heavenly kingdoms in Mormon theology

== Other uses ==
- Celestials, 19th century term for people of the Celestial Empire (China)

== See also ==
- Celesta
- Celestia (disambiguation)
- Celestial Bodies, 2019 novel by Jokha Alharthi
- Celestial Empire, a 19th-century term for Chinese emigrants to the United States, Canada, and Australia
- Celestial Seasonings
- Celestial Semiconductor
- Hain Celestial Group
- Tianchao Daguo or "Celestial Kingdom", a term used to refer to the country of China
