= Celeste de Longpré Heckscher =

American composer

Celeste de Longpré Heckscher née Massey (23 February 1860 – 18 February 1928) was an American composer.

== Life ==
Celeste de Longpré Massey was born in Philadelphia, Pennsylvania, the daughter of Robert Valentine Massey Jr. and Julia Whitney Pratt Massey. She began composing at the age of ten but her parents objected to her study of music. She married banker and steel merchant John Austin Stevens Heckscher in 1883 and had four children.

After her marriage, Heckscher studied composition with Henry Albert Lang and orchestration with Wasili Leps in Philadelphia, and later continued her studies in Europe. In 1913 Heckscher gave a concert of her own compositions in New York City at the Aeolian Hall. In 1918 she premiered her opera The Rose of Destiny at the Metropolitan Opera House in Philadelphia as a fund-raiser for the Red Cross. She was active in and served as president of the Philadelphia Operatic Society for a number of years. She died in Germantown, Philadelphia.

== Works ==
Selected works include:

- The Rose of Destiny, opera
- The Flight of Time, opera
- The Norse Maiden's Lament
- To the Forest, opera
- Impromptu, for piano
- Au Fond, for piano
- Valse Bohême, book of seven songs
- Romance for cello
- Dances of the Pyrenees, orchestral suite and ballet
