= Erika Celeste =

American journalist

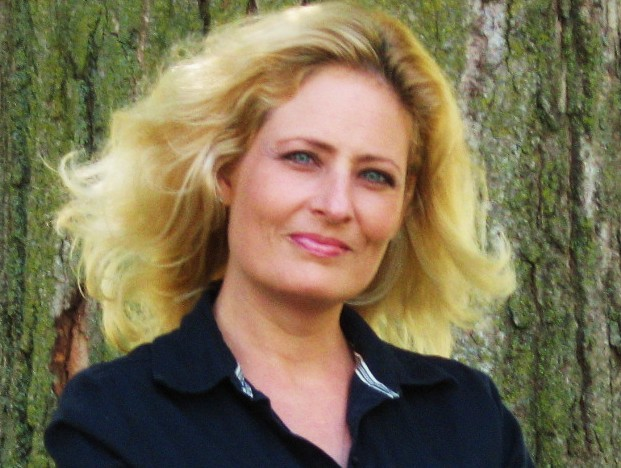
Erika Celeste

Erika Celeste is an American journalist who has worked in radio, print, and television since 1992. She has won two Tellys, an Edward R. Murrow Award, and several AP Awards.

She currently runs a small freelancing company [www.ecnewmoon.com New Moon Media Group]. She's ghostwritten or co-authored more than 20 books including the soon to be released Still Standing: The Seven Miracles of Matthew Reum, A Lion Has No Horns, and Follow Your Heart which won the honorable mention in the biography category at the Hollywood Book Festival.

She gained national attention for her work on adoption fraud, scams, and child crimes published with Business Insider. The most popular of which were The Natalia Grace Story, Return to the Tennessee Children's Home Society, and her personal narrative on notorious baby scammer Gabby Watson.

Celeste has worked for several news network affiliates including ABC, NBC, CBS, CNN, and PBS. She has also freelanced for many national and international organizations including Voice of America, Public Radio International and National Public Radio. She has written several documentaries including Red Salt and Reynolds, Just Like Anyone, and the forthcoming Secrets of the Valley (fall 2010) narrated by Morgan Spurlock of Super Size Me fame.

== Early years ==
Celeste is of Polish, French, Irish, Italian and German descent. She spent most of her early childhood in Minnesota.

Her father, Wayne Brass, is a retired UCC pastor, and her mother, Renee Brass, is a retired nurse.

In August 1979 the family was involved in a serious car accident which took the life of her younger sister, Celeste. This prompted Erika Celeste to take her sister's name as a tribute, first professionally and later legally.

Later Celeste attended Western Michigan University, then transferred to University of Indianapolis, and graduated from Indiana State University with a focus in Theater and Communications and Anthropology.

== Personal life ==
Erika Celeste was married to Michael Hobbs in 1992. They had 2 sons Cameren Justice and Kaleb Hunter before divorcing in 1999.

Celeste married Michael Marturello, the editor of the Herald Republicanin 2012. They have 2 children Christopher Rollin and Chloe Hope.

After marrying Marturello, the couple served as foster parents for close to a decade. During that time, the family was stalked twice for their efforts. Celeste single-handedly lobbied her state legislature to make sure other foster parents wouldn't face the same horrors in the future. Through her efforts the legislature unanimously passed a new law in 2016 making it a felony to stalk foster parents in the line of duty.

== Sources ==
- https://haventmetforever.com
- https://tobehonestinc.com
- https://muckrack.com/erika-celeste/articles
- http://www.ecnewmoon.com
- http://www.authorhouse.com/bookStore/ItemDetail.aspx?bookid=60866
