= Circle X (EP) =

EP by Circle X
- Released: 1980
- Genre: No wave
- Label: Celluloid

Circle X chronology
Circle X (1980)	Prehistory (1983)

Circle X (officially untitled) is an EP and the debut release by American experimental rock band Circle X. It was on 12" vinyl in 1980 in France, through then-nascent record label Celluloid.

== Background ==
CMJ described the album as a "raw, alien, dense set of four tuneless almost-not-even-songs made of spattered guitar, drums and Tony Pinotti's wrecked, howling voice".

== Track listing ==
Side A
No.	Title	Length
1.	"Tender"	2:34
2.	"Albeit Living"	2:30

Side B
No.	Title	Length
1.	"Onward Christian Soldiers"	3:34
2.	"Underworld"	2:54

== Critical reception ==
Trouser Press opined that the EP was "practically unmatched in its day. [...] Nothing sounded like this in 1979. Circle X caught the tail end of the no wave scene and out-waved it with a mere four ear-splitting compositions."

== Re-issues ==
Circle X was later re-issued on CD in 1996 through label Dexter's Cigar. It was re-issued on 12" vinyl in Germany in 2009 through label Insolito.

== Personnel ==
- David Letendre – drums, guitar
- Rik Letendre – guitar, drums
- Tony Pinotti – vocals
- Bruce Witsiepe – guitar
