= Celeste Coltellini =

Italian singer and opera singer

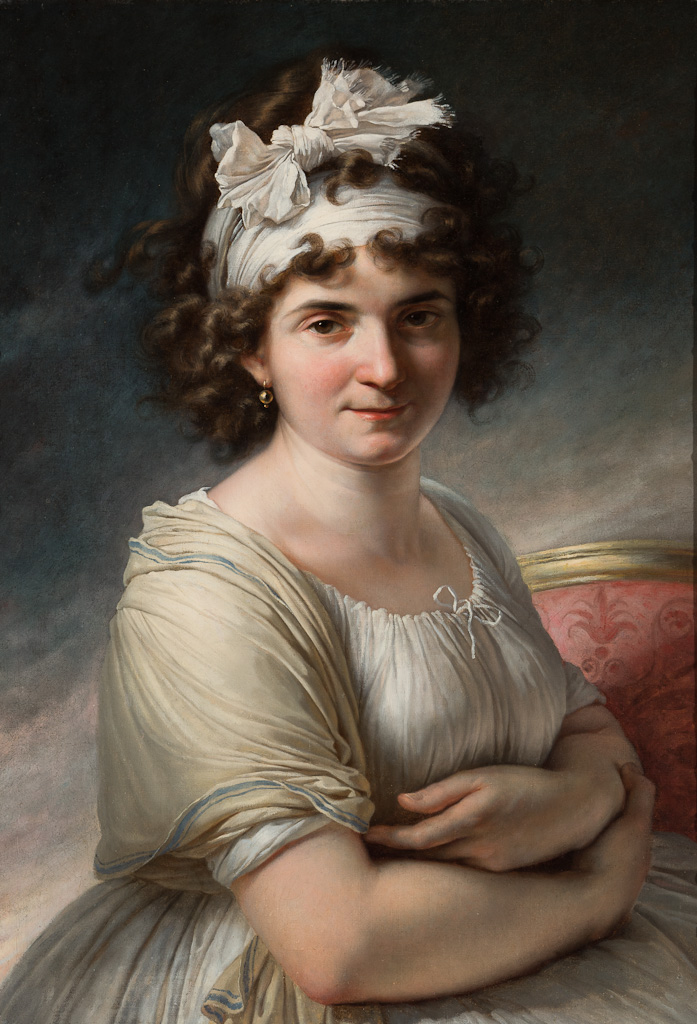
- Born: 26 November 1760; Livorno
- Died: 24 July 1829 (aged 68); Capodimonte, Naples
- Occupation: Opera singer

Celeste Coltellini (26 November 1760 – 24 July 1828) was an Italian soprano. She was a well-known singer of opera buffa in Europe in the late 18th century. Celeste was the daughter of a librettist, Marco Coltellini. She made her debut at Teatro alla Scala in Milan, performing in three operas: Giovanni Valentini's Le nozze in contrasto, Giacomo Rust's Gli antiquari in Palmira and Giovanni Paisiello's La Frascatana, singing in mezzo-soprano register. She then sang at Teatro San Carlo in Naples, where she had the opportunity to meet Emperor Joseph II, who later invited her to perform in Vienna. She made her Vienna debut in 1785, singing Domenico Cimarosa’s Contadina di spirito. She was seen with Mozart several times at music performances and parties; however, there is no record or any official report of collaboration by them.

Coltellini was famous for her excellent interpretation of the title role in Nina, o sia La pazza per amore by Giovanni Paisiello.

== Life ==
Celeste Coltellini was born on 26 November 1760. She was an Italian soprano, and a well-known singer of opera buffa in Europe in the late 18th century.

Born in Livorno, Celeste was the daughter of a librettist, Marco Coltellini. In 1780, she made her debut at Teatro alla Scala in Milan, performing in three operas: Giovanni Valentini's Le nozze in contrasto, Giacomo Rust's Gli antiquari in Palmira and Giovanni Paisiello's La Frascatana, singing in mezzo-soprano register. She then sang at Teatro San Carlo in Naples, where she had the opportunity to meet Emperor Joseph II, who later invited her to perform in Vienna.

When her voice changed to soprano, she accepted the Emperor's invitation. In 1785, she went to Vienna with her mother, and stayed there for a year. In Vienna, she made her debut singing Domenico Cimarosa’s Contadina di spirito. She returned to Vienna again in 1788, but stayed just for a few months. She was seen with Mozart several times at music performances and parties; however, there is no record or any official report of collaboration by them.

Coltellini was famous for her excellent interpretation of the title role in Nina, o sia La pazza per amore by Giovanni Paisiello. She was admired for her acting skills. Her sister Annetta, also a singer, often accompanied her in the production.

In 1792, at the age of 32, Celeste retired from the opera stage and married the Swiss banker Jean-Georges Meuricoffre who owned a bank in Naples.

Coltellini died in Naples in 24 July 1828.
