= Céleste Boursier-Mougenot =

French artist

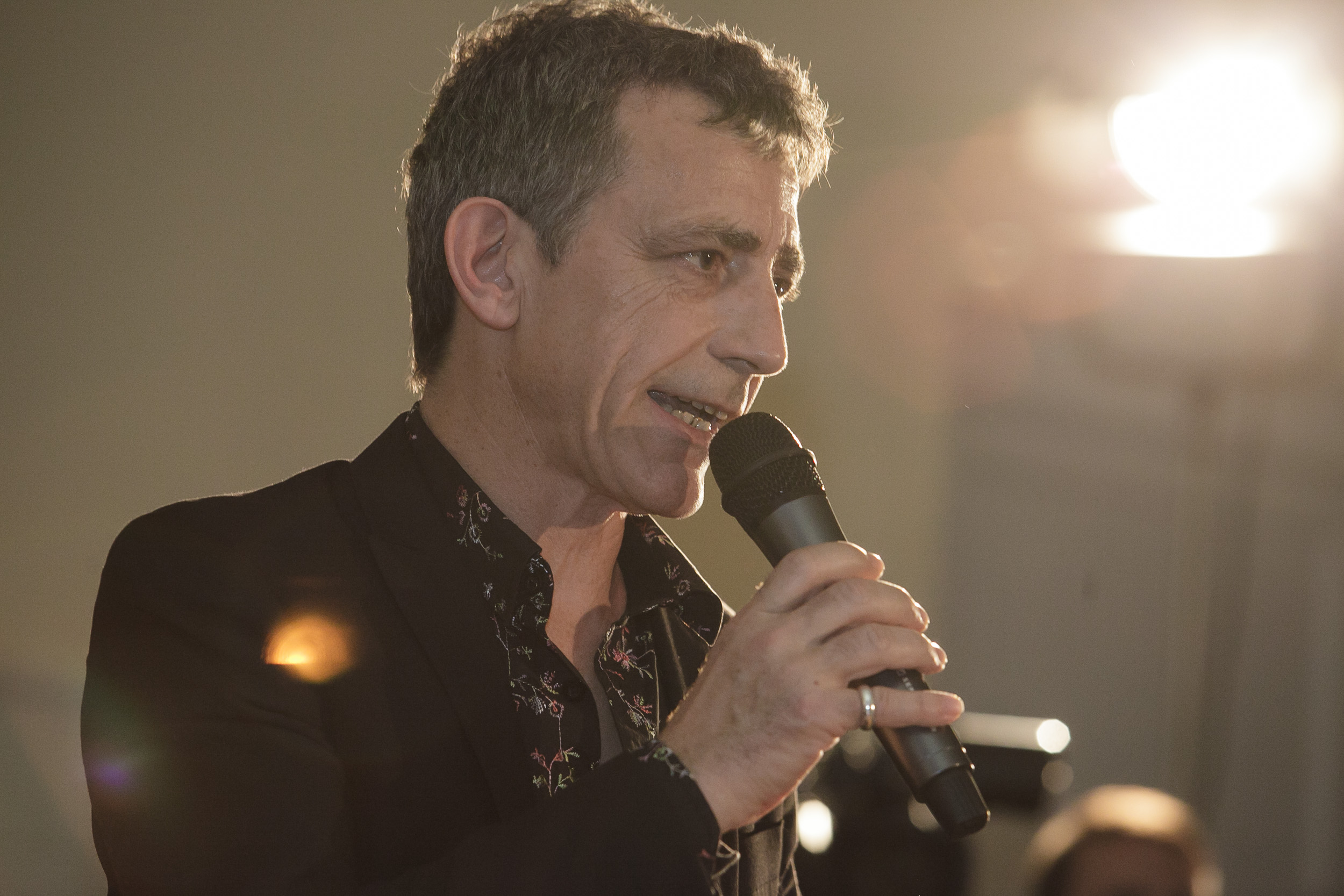
- Boursier-Mougenot in 2016
- Born: 1961 (age 64–65); Sète, France

Céleste Boursier-Mougenot (French: [selɛst buʁsje muʒəno]; born 1961 in Nice, France) is a modern French artist. He lives and works in Sète, France.

== Works ==
Boursier-Mougenot's works unite musical and visual spheres and contain unexpected sources of musical sounds. Situations or devices are created which provide the means for musical events to be expressed visually or visual information acoustically.

The composer Boursier-Mougenot creates the set of standards for sound producing rather than music. The artist tests the acoustic potential of usual objects, situations, and actions.

In 'Videodrones' (2001) Boursier-Mougenot addresses nonconventional use of video. Work allows the audience to watch everyday details of a familiar environment. On five screens in the exhibition space, real time views of streets, boulevards and the sidewalks are projected. Actions (the movement of pedestrians and transport) create a cascade of sounds, describing events as music.

=== From Here to Ear ===
In 'From Here to Ear' (1999), the artist used a flock of zebra finches interacting with electric guitars and amplifiers to create an ephemeral acoustic composition, the form of which was defined by the behavior of the birds. Similar to Cage's practice, Boursier-Mougenot's method lies first of all in transliterations of natural structure, aural identification of certain realities which are not visible to our eyes.

The artist places electric guitars and amplifiers in an open-air cage with zebra finches and records sounds made by birds when landing on an electric guitar and touching the strings (in one of the videos a bird touched a string with a branch in a beak). "Concert" with amadin in which about 40 birds were involved, was shown in one of the exhibition halls of London (Barbican Centre), and before – in Galerie Xippas (Paris) and Lentos Kunstmuseum (Linz, Austria). This work caused considerable interest in mass media.

'clinamen v.3', 2012–ongoing Exhibited in 'Soundtracks' exhibition at SFMOMA in 2017. Floating porcelain bowls clink together as they circulate gently on water, producing a percussive soundscape of unexpected musicality. The French artist Céleste Boursier-Mougenot has brought the architectural feature of the gazing pool indoors to create what he describes as "a kind of dream". He explains, "The bowls are moved by an invisible force, and the presence of water is fascinating. It makes for a totally natural connection between the objects. . . . I am spontaneously drawn by this type of state, between incertitude and floating".

== Personal exhibitions ==
- 2025 clinamen, Bourse de Commerce, Paris
- 2010 Barbican artgallery, The Curve, London
- 2010 No vinyl any more, la Maison Rouge, Antoine de Galbert Foundation, Paris
- 2009—2010 videodrones (version 6), Musée Chagall, Nice
- 2009 World Financial Center, for the New-York Electronic Festival, New York
- 2009 duplex, Cour Louis XIV, Musée Carnavalet, for the Nuit Blanche event, Paris
- 2009 Variation, Pinacoteca, São Paulo
- 2009 index, virus, solidvideo, détail, Paula Cooper gallery, New York
- 2008–09 index, Théâtre de Gennevilliers, Centre Dramatique National
- 2008 from here to ear, recycle, zombiedrones, Galerie Xippas, Paris
- 2006 harmonichaos & flamByframe, Paula Cooper gallery, New York
- 2006 états seconds, Le Collège/ F.R.A.C Champagne-Ardenne, Reims
- 2004 untitled (series IV), Le Maillon, Théâtre de Strasbourg, Strasbourg
- 2003 untitled (Series III), "Cerca Series – Céleste Boursier-Mougenot" Museum of Modern Art, San Diego
- 2002 videodrones & harmonichaos, Le Grand Café, Saint-Nazaire
- 2001 untitled (series III), Rice University Art Gallery, Houston
- 2001 videodrones, Synagogue of Delme, Delme
- 2001 untitled (series III), Trinitaires church, F.R.A.C Lorraine, Metz
- 2001 untitled (series III), Herzliya Museum of Art, Herzliya
- 2001 videodrones, Paula Cooper Gallery, New York
- 2000 from here to ear & untitled (Series III), Contemporary Art Center, Cincinnati
- 2000 harmonichaos, Genêteil chapel, Gauntie Castle
- 1999 untitled (series II), Paula Cooper Gallery, New York
- 1997 untitled (series I), Musée de Bordeaux, Bordeaux
- 1996 cadre & cut-up, Galerie chez Valentin, Paris
