= Circle X =

American experimental rock band

- Origin: Louisville, Kentucky, United States
- Genres: Experimental rock, post-punk, no wave
- Years active: 1978–1995
- Labels: Matador, American Gothic, Index, Enigma, Lungcast, Fractal
- Past members: Bruce Witsiepe; Tony Pinotti; Dave Letendre; Rik Letendre; Mike McShane; Martin Köb; Robert "Sugie" Goss

Circle X was an American experimental rock band, formed in 1978 in Louisville, Kentucky. They were part of the late 1970s/early 1980s No Wave scene.

== Background ==
=== Early career ===
Circle X formed in Louisville, Kentucky in 1978 when art students Bruce Witsiepe and Tony Pinotti abandoned the punk band No Fun to join brothers Rik Letendre and Dave Letendre, who played in the I-Holes – both bands of which were considered the first punk bands in Louisville. By the end of 1978, the four had relocated to New York City, joining in on the No Wave scene and building a reputation for themselves.

The band then relocated to Dijon, France, touring for nine months with their new manager, Bernard Zekhri. The band received strong attention from the press and the public, whilst the band were writing new material. An untitled four-song EP, for then-nascent Celluloid Records, was released in 1980.

Following this, the band returned to New York, where they recorded their debut studio album, Prehistory, in 1981. The album went unreleased until 1983, when it was released by the California-based consortium of Enigma and Index Records.

=== Later career ===
As the decade progressed, the band recruited drummer Mike McShane and guest violinist Lois Dilivio, while the band started to perform complex art performances, often involving mechanical constructions as well as collaborative visuals with filmmakers Bradley Eros and Jeanne Liotta. In addition, the band's music now saw the integration of synth, tape and sample technology.

In 1989, the band published a limited-edition book, Anti-Utopia.

In 1992, drummer Martin Koeb joined Pinotti, Witsiepe and Letendre for four white vinyl 7" singles for Matador, American Gothic and Lungcast Records, titled The Ivory Tower and released over the course of a year. The music remained eerie and harsh, but was increasingly more complex.

In 1994, Circle X released their second studio album, Celestial, on Matador.

The band disbanded in 1995 after founding member and guitarist Bruce Witsiepe died from HIV complications.

A reformed Circle X with Letendre, Pinotti, Dilivio, Byron Stevens, and Michael Evans was invited to perform at Cropped Out VII in 2017.

== Discography ==
Studio albums

- Prehistory (1983)
- Celestial (1994)

EPs

- Circle X (1980)
- Frammenti De Junk (1994)

Live albums

- Live in Dijon '79 (2009)

Singles

- "Heartbreaker"/"Look at the People" (1979)
- "Shiny Blue Orb" (1992)
- "Millions" (1992)
- "33/Puerto Rican Ghost" (1992)
- "Compression of the Species" (1992)
