= Celeste Johnson =

American singer and television host (born 1959)

- Born: Celeste Johnson; 1959 (age 65–66)
- Origin: Chicago, Illinois
- Genres: Pop, italo disco
- Occupation: Singer
- Years active: 1983–present

Celeste Johnson (born 1959 in Chicago, Illinois), also known as Celeste, is an American singer, model and former professional long jump athlete.

In the 1980s, she achieved fame in Italy as a model and singer after she was discovered by producer Claudio Cecchetto in Milan. In 1983 she released her first single, Love & musica.

In 1984 she was a regular guest on TV shows like Sponsor City (Rete 4 and Premiatissima (Canale 5). In 1985 she released her first album, Celeste. One of the songs from the album, "Lascia che sia", was released as a single and topped the Italian charts for five weeks. The same year Celeste performed at Festivalbar.

In 1986 she released her second album, Blue.

In 1987 she recorded "Hot Girl", a duet with Italo disco Star Sabrina Salerno.

In 1991 she switched to the DDD Label and recorded her fourth album, The Swing of Love.

== Long jump career ==
Johnson competed in the AIAW for the Iowa State Cyclones track and field team. She set indoor and outdoor long jump school records that still stand as of 2021. She finished 8th in the long jump at the 1978 AIAW Outdoor Track and Field Championships. Her personal best was 20 ft 3 3/4 in (6.19 m).

== Discography ==
- Celeste (Five Records, 1985)
- Blue (Five Records, 1985)
- The Seventh Wind (Five Records, 1989)
- The Swing of Love (DDD, 1991)
