= Celia (given name) =

- Pronunciation: /ˈsiːliə/ SEE-lee-ə
- Gender: Female

Origin
- Languages: Latin, Berber
- Meaning: Heaven, quern-stone (in Berber languages)
- Region of origin: Western Europe, Latin America, Maghreb

Other names
- Related names: Cecilia, Cecelia, Celeste, Celestina, Celie

Celia is a feminine given name of Latin origin, as well as a nickname for Cecilia, Cecelia, Celeste, or Celestina. The name is often derived from the Roman family name Caelius, thought to originate in the Latin caelum ("heaven"). Celia was popular in British pastoral literature in the seventeenth and eighteenth centuries, possibly stemming from the ruler of the House of Holiness in Edmund Spenser's epic poem The Faerie Queene or from a character in William Shakespeare's play As You Like It.

Celia could indeed have Berber origins, since it is considered as a variant of the Quinquegentiani princess Cyria, daughter of Flavius Nubel. The name is derived from the Berber word "Tissirt" meaning quern-stone. The name shares the same origins as the historical city Cirta. A popular variant of the name is Silya/Celya.

It is a popular name in Lebanon and Maghreb countries (Algeria more specifically).

== Names with similar meanings in other languages ==
- Kūlani ("heavenly", Hawaiian)
- Silke (German)
- Sylia (Berber)
- Shiela (English)
- Célia (French)
- Celia (Galician, Italian, Polish, Spanish)
- Ουρανία ("heavens", Greek, pronounced [uraˈni.a])
- Cèlia (Catalan)
- Célia (Portuguese)
- Ciel, Cielke, Cieltje (Dutch)
- Síle (Irish, Gaelic)
- Silje (Norwegian)

== Notable people with the name ==
- Celia (slave) (c. 1835–1855), American slave executed for murder
- Celia Adler (1889–1979), American actress
- Célia Allamargot (born 1986), French professional squash player
- Celia Allison (born 1958), New Zealand illustrator
- Celia Álvarez Muñoz (born 1937), American Chicana mixed-media conceptual artist and photographer
- Celia Ammerman, American contestant on America's Next Top Model season 12
- Celia Amorós (born 1944), Spanish philosopher, essayist, and supporter of feminist theory
- Celia Applegate (born 1959), American professor of German history
- Celia Argumedo, Argentine politician
- Celia Au, American actress and filmmaker
- Célia Aymonier (born 1991), French cross-country skier and biathlete
- Celia B. Fisher, American psychologist
- Celia Bannerman (born 1944), English actress and director
- Celia Barboza (born 1977), Uruguayan surfer, physical education teacher, and surfing instructor
- Celia Barker Lottridge (born 1936), American-Canadian children's writer
- Celia Barlow (born 1955), English politician
- Celia Barquín Arozamena (1996–2018), Spanish golfer
- Celia Barrios de Reyna (1834–1897), Guatemalan mother of President José María Reina Barrios and sister of President Justo Rufino Barrios
- Celia Baudot de Moschini (1910–2006), Argentine chess player
- Célia Bertin (1920–2014), French writer, journalist, biographer, French Resistance fighter, and winner of the 1953 Prix Renaudot
- Celia Birtwell (born 1941), English textile- and fashion designer
- Celia Blaylock (1850–1888), American prostitute; common-law wife of lawman Wyatt Earp
- Celia Bobak (born 1952), English art director and set decorator
- Célia Bourgeois (born 1983), French cross-country skier
- Celia Bourihane (born 1995), Algerian volleyball player
- Celia Brackenridge (1950–2018), English sportswoman, campaigner, and academic
- Celia Brañas (1880–1948), Spanish scientist and teacher
- Celia Brayfield (born 1945), English author, academic, and cultural commentator
- Celia Britton (1946–2024), British scholar of French Caribbean literature and thought
- Celia Brooks Brown (born 1969), American-born English vegetarian chef, author, and television host
- Celia Buckmaster (1914–2005), British novelist and poet
- Celia Calderón (1921–1969), Mexican visual artist
- Celia Calle, American illustrator, fashion designer, and comic book penciller
- Celia Castro (1860–1930), Chilean visual artist
- Celia Chazelle (born 1954), Canadian historian and author
- Celia Cooney (1904–1992), American robber
- Célia Coppi (born 1980), Brazilian handball player
- Celia Correas de Zapata (1933–2022), Argentine academic, poet, author, and scholar of Latin American women writers
- Celia Corres (born 1964), Spanish field hockey player
- Celia Cruz (1925–2003), Cuban singer and actress
- Celia D. Costas, American television- and film producer
- Celia Dale (1912–2011), English author and book reviewer
- Celia Deane-Drummond (born 1956), American theologian and professor of science
- Celia de Fréine, Irish poet, playwright, screenwriter, and librettist
- Célia de Lavergne (born 1979), French politician
- Celia de Molina (born 1983), Spanish actress and screenwriter
- Celia Deutsch, American Roman Catholic religious sister, academic, educator, writer, professor, and Old Testament scholar
- Celia Dial Saxon (1857–1935), African-American schoolmistress
- Celia Díaz Laurel (1928–2021), Filipina theatre actress, singer, and painter; former Second Lady of the Philippines
- Celia Diemkoudre (born 1992), Dutch volleyball player
- Celia Ditshetelo, South African politician
- Célia Domain (born 2000), French rugby union player
- Celia Douty (1943–1983), British-born Australian resort worker and murder victim
- Celia Dropkin (1887–1956), Russian-born American Yiddish poet, writer, and artist
- Celia Duff (born 1953/1954), British doctor and Hyrox athlete
- Célia Dupré (born 2001), Swiss rower
- Celia Farber (born c. 1965), American print journalist and author
- Celia Fiennes (1662–1741), English traveler and writer
- Celia Fiennes (artist) (1902–1998), English artist, printmaker, and book illustrator
- Celia Fiorotto (born 1992), Argentine basketball player
- Celia Foulon (born 1979), French rower
- Celia Franca (1921–2007), English-born Canadian ballerina, ballet teacher, actress, and founder of National Ballet of Canada
- Celia Frances Bedford (1904–1959), English artist
- Celia Freijeiro (born 1983), Spanish film-, theater-, and television actress and producer
- Celia Fremlin (1914–2009), English writer of mystery fiction
- Celia Gámez (1905–1992), Argentine film actress
- Celia García Ayala (born 1971), Mexican politician
- Celia García-García, Spanish pianist
- Celia Gaynor (born 2000), American professional soccer player
- Celia Geraldy (?–1977), Argentine vedette actress in film and theater
- Célia Gery (born 2006), French professional cyclo-cross- and road cyclist
- Celia Gould (born 1957), American businesswoman and politician
- Celia Graham (born 1976), Scottish musical theatre actress
- Celia Green (born 1935), British parapsychologist and writer on parapsychology
- Celia Greenwood, Canadian biostatistician
- Celia Gregory (1949–2008), English stage-, film-, and television actress, and faith healer
- Celia Griffin (1841–1847), Irish famine victim
- Celia Grillo Borromeo (1684–1777), Italian natural philosopher, mathematician, and scientist
- Celia Haddon (born 1945), English journalist, author, and expert on feline behaviour
- Celia Haig-Brown (born 1947), Euro-Canadian scholar, researcher, educator, and filmmaker
- Celia Hammond (born 1943), English former model and animal welfare activist
- Celia Hammond (politician) (born 1968), Australian politician and academic
- Celia Hart (1962–2008), Cuban physicist and writer
- Celia Harvey (born 1962/1963), British soldier and academic
- Celia Hawkesworth (born 1942), British author, lecturer, and translator of Serbo-Croatian
- Celia Hempton, British artist
- Celia Herrera Rodriguez (born 1952), American educator, painter, and performance- and installation artist
- Celia Holman Lee (born 1950), Irish model, fashion stylist, and television presenter
- Celia Hoyles (born 1946), British mathematician, educationalist, and professor of mathematics education
- Celia Humphris (1950–2021), English singer and voice artist
- Celia Imrie (born 1952), British actress and author
- Celia Ireland (born 1966), Australian actress
- Celia Isabel Gauna Ruiz (born 1964), Mexican politician
- Celia Israel (born 1964), American politician
- Celia Jiménez (disambiguation), several people
- Célia Jodar (born 1988), French-born Moroccan slalom canoeist
- Celia Johnson (1908–1982), English stage-, television-, and film actress
- Celia Jokisch (born 1954), Salvadoran swimmer
- Célia Joseph-Noël (born 2003), French rhythmic gymnast
- Celia Kaye (born 1942), American actress
- Celia Keenan-Bolger (born 1978), American actress and singer
- Celia Kerslake (1946–2023), British Turkologist
- Celia Kirwan, English friend of author George Orwell
- Celia Kitzinger (born 1956), English university professor
- Celia Klemski (1919–2016), American secretary for the Manhattan Project
- Celia Kritharioti (born 1968), Greek fashion designer
- Celia Kwok (born 1986), Hong Kong actress and fashion model
- Celia Larkin, Irish civil servant; former partner of Irish Prime Minister Bertie Ahern
- Celia Lashlie (1953–2015), New Zealand prison officer, social justice advocate, and author
- Célia Lawson, Portuguese contestant in the Portugal in the Eurovision Song Contest 1997
- Celia Levetus (1874–1936), Canadian-English author, poet, and illustrator
- Celia Lipton (1923–2011), British actress, singer, and philanthropist
- Celia Loe (born 1943), Singaporean pioneering fashion designer
- Celia Logan (1837–1904), American actress, playwright, and writer
- Celia Lovsky (1897–1979), Austrian-American actress
- Celia Lynch (1908–1989), Irish politician
- Celia Maestre (born 1981), Spanish track and field sighted guide and social worker
- Celia Magnana (born 1991), Algerian international volleyball player
- Celia Manson (1908–1987), New Zealand writer, journalist, and broadcaster
- Celia Mara (born 1961), Brazilian singer-songwriter and producer
- Celia María Damestoi, birth name of Lilian Valmar (1928–2013), Argentine actress and vedette
- Celia Mary Oakley (1931–2014), British cardiologist
- Celia Maxwell, American infectious disease physician and academic administrator
- Celia McGuire, American actress
- Celia Mercedes Alpuche Aranda (born 1956), Mexican pediatric infectious disease specialist, researcher, and teacher
- Celia Monedero (born 2000), Spanish actress
- Celia Montalván (1899–1958), Mexican film-, stage-, and television actress
- Celia Moss Levetus (1819–1873), English writer
- Celia Newman (born 1968), Mexican-born American actress and jewelry designer
- Celia Nyamweru, British-Kenyan physical geographer and anthropologist
- Celia Ouikene (born 2003), Algerian karateka
- Celia Pacquola (born 1983), Australian comedian, writer, presenter, and actress
- Celia Parker Woolley (1848–1918), American novelist, Unitarian minister, and social reformer
- Celia Paul (born 1959), Indian-born British painter
- Celia Pavey, real name of Vera Blue, Australian singer-songwriter
- Celia Pearce (born 1961), American game designer
- Célia Perron (born 1997), French multi-event athlete
- Célia Posser, São Tomé and Príncipe lawyer and politician
- Celia Quansah (born 1995), English rugby sevens player
- Celia Quinn, Northern Irish camogie player
- Celia Rees (born 1949), English author
- Celia Rico Clavellino (born 1982), Spanish writer and film director
- Celia Rivenbark, American humor columnist and author
- Celia Robledo (born 1994), Spanish retired ice dancer
- Celia Rodriguez (born 1938), Filipino actress
- Celia Rose Gooding (born 2000), American actor and singer
- Celia Ross, Canadian former politician and university president
- Celia Rosser (born 1930), Australian botanical illustrator
- Celia Rowlson-Hall, American dancer, choreographer, and film director
- Célia Russo (1944–1999), English-born French-Argentine educator and academic administrator
- Celia S. Friedman (born 1957), American speculative fiction writer and teacher
- Celia Sánchez (1920–1980), Cuban revolutionary, politician, researcher, and archivist
- Cèlia Sànchez-Mústich (born 1954), Spanish poet and writer in the Catalan language
- Célia Šašić (born 1988), German footballer
- Celia Sawyer (born 1966), British businesswoman, interior designer, and dealer
- Celia Schultz, American professor of classical studies and history
- Celia Sebiri (1913–2006), American jewelry designer
- Celia Seerane (born 1990), South African field hockey player
- Celia Segura (born 2007), Spanish footballer
- Célia Serber (born 2003), French artistic gymnast
- Celia Stopnicka Heller (1922–2011), Polish-born American sociologist
- Celia Stubbs, New Zealand partner of victim Clement Blair Peach
- Celia Sullohern (born 1992), Australian long-distance runner
- Cèlia Suñol i Pla (1899–1986), Catalan writer
- Célia Surget, French rabbi
- Celia Tapias (1885–1964), Argentine lawyer
- Celia Thaxter (1835–1894), American writer of poetry and stories
- Celia Thomas, Baroness Thomas of Winchester (born 1945), British life peeress
- Celia Torrá (1889–1962), Argentine composer, conductor, and violinist
- Celia V. Monrouzeau Martínez (1944–2006), Puerto Rican politician
- Celia Villalobos (born 1949), Spanish politician
- Celia Viveros (1925–1979), Mexican film actress
- Celia von Bismarck (1971–2010), Swiss humanitarian, socialite, magazine editor, and philanthropist
- Celia W. Dugger (born 1958), American journalist and editor
- Celia Wade-Brown (born 1956), New Zealand politician
- Celia Walden (born 1975), British journalist, novelist, and critic
- Celia Welch (born 1960), American winemaker
- Celia Weston (born 1951), American character actress
- Celia Whitelaw, Viscountess Whitelaw (1917–2011), British horticulturist, philanthropist, and service member during World War II; wife of politician William "Willie" Whitelaw, MP
- Celia White Tabor (1918–2012), American biochemist and physician-scientist
- Celia Williamson, American university professor of social work, researcher, and community advocate
- Celia Winter-Irving (1941–2009), Australian-born, Zimbabwean-based artist and art critic
- Celia Woodsmith (born 1985), American country singer, songwriter, and guitarist
- Celia Wray (1872–1954), English suffragette and architect
- Célia Xakriabá (born 1990), Indigenous Brazilian educator and activist
- Celia Zaldumbide Rosales (1926–2014), Ecuadorian pianist, teacher, and cultural manager

== Fictional characters ==
- Celia, in the play As You Like It
- Celia, in the Japanese manga series Rave Master, voiced by Ryoka Yuzuki in some video games
- Celia B., in the US animated sitcom Regular Show
- Celia Carmichael, in the 1989 Australian horror drama film Celia, played by Rebecca Smart
- Celia Castle, in the US superhero TV series Arrow, played by Christina Cox
- Celia Donald, in the Australian police drama series Blue Heelers, played by Helen Trenos and Suzy Cato
- Celia Facilier, in the 2019 US musical fantasy TV film Descendants 3, played by Jadah Marie
- Celia Fitzgerald, in the US TV soap opera All My Children, played by Jordan Lane Price
- Celia Flores, in the US post-apocalyptic horror drama TV series Fear the Walking Dead, played by Marlene Forte
- Celia Forrest, in the 1991 UK TV comedy drama The Sharp End, played by Gwen Taylor
- Celia Fury, in the children's book- and TV series The Revenge Files of Alistair Fury, played by Susannah Doyle in the TV series
- Celia Gálvez de Montalbán, in the Spanish novels starting in 1929 with Celia, lo que dice
- Celia Gerard, in the US period spy drama TV series The Americans, played by Gillian Alexy
- Celia Hodes, in the US dark comedy-drama TV series Weeds, played by Elizabeth Perkins
- Celia Machado, in the US drama TV series Dynasty, played by Nathalie Kelley, Ana Brenda Contreras, and Daniella Alonso
- Celia Mae, in the 2001 US animated comedy film Monsters Inc., voiced by Jennifer Tilly
- Celia Osborne, in the UK soap opera Hollyoaks, played by Carol Noakes
- Celia Quartermaine, in the US daytime TV soap opera General Hospital, played by Sherilyn Wolter
- Celia Shelburn, in the 2005 French romantic comedy-drama film Russian Dolls, played by Lucy Gordon
- Celia Solis, in the US mystery comedy-drama TV series Desperate Housewives
- Celia Stewart, in the Australian TV soap opera Home and Away, played by Fiona Spence
- Celia Windward, in the US comic book publisher DC Comics
