= Scyatta Wallace =

American psychologist

- Occupation: Associate Professor of Psychology
- Awards: APA Division 35 (Psychology of Women) Early Career Award

Academic background
- Education: Yale University, Fordham University

Academic work
- Institutions: St. John's University
- Website: https://www.scyattawallace.com

Scyatta A. Wallace is a developmental psychologist who studies how gender, race, and culture impact health outcomes of urban Black youth. In her community-based research and practice, Wallace emphasizes the importance of cultural competence and the need to diversify the workforce in health and mental health professions to better serve ethnic-minority communities. Wallace is an associate professor of psychology with tenure at St. John's University.

Wallace received the American Psychological Association (APA) Carolyn Payton Early Career Award from the Society for the Psychology of Women (APA, Division 35) in 2012. This award was given in recognition of Wallace's co-authored paper titled Gold Diggers, Video Vixens, and Jezebels: Stereotype Images and Substance Use Among Urban African American Girl, which documented higher rates of substance use in African American adolescent girls who endorsed Western standards of beauty (e.g., a preference for lighter complexion and straightened hair) as compared to those who endorsed African American standards of beauty.

== Biography ==
Wallace was raised in Washington DC. Growing up, she lived in low income housing and witnessed the consequences of poverty, which influenced her career trajectory. She completed a BA in Psychology at Yale University in 1996 and a PhD in Developmental Psychology at Fordham University in 2002. At Fordham, Wallace collaborated with Celia Fisher on research focusing on adolescent distress and psychopathology and, additionally, received mentorship from pioneering psychologist and civil rights activist, Olivia Hooker. Wallace's dissertation, titled Cultural resilience: an examination of parent, peer, and cultural factors associated with black teenage attitudes toward delinquency and substance use, was completed under the supervision of Fisher.

Wallace's interests in health began as a PhD candidate when she received an APA health policy fellowship. She subsequently completed a post-doctoral fellowship at the Division of HIV/AIDS Prevention, Centers for Disease Control and Prevention and was a National Institutes of Health (NIH) health disparities scholar from 2002 to 2004. Wallace has held leadership positions on the APA Ad Hoc Committee on Psychology and AIDS and has served on the National Institute on Drug Abuse African American Scholars Working Group.

Wallace was assistant professor of Preventive Medicine and Community Health at SUNY Downstate Medical Center prior to joining the faculty of St. John's University. At St. John's, she was recipient of the Faculty Excellence Award for Leadership, Mentoring and Research from St. John's University Vincentian Institute for Social Action.

Wallace's research team uses community-based participatory research to promote youth engagement and empowerment around issues of health and self-esteem. Her multi-year Minority HIV/AIDS Research Initiative was funded through the NIH starting in 2007, and focused on decreasing HIV risk among Black adolescents and young adults. Wallace's work has been featured on ABCnews.com, Essence magazine, and other media outlets.
