= IPMI International Business School =

Indonesian business school

- Motto: Fast - Sharp - Relevant
- Type: International Business School
- Established: 1984
- President: Prof. Aman Wirakartakusumah
- Location: Jl. Rawajati Timur I/1, Kalibata, Jakarta Selatan 12750, Jakarta, Indonesia; 6.25747°S 106.85485°E
- Colors: Yellow Blue
- Website: http://www.ipmi.ac.id

IPMI International Business School (formerly Indonesia Institute for Management Development) is a business school located in Jl. Rawajati Timur I/1, Kalibata, South of Jakarta, Indonesia. It offers both bachelor's and master's degrees in business administration, along with some other business programs, all delivered in English. Starting in 2012, IPMI International Business School is also focusing on business research to improve business in Indonesia.

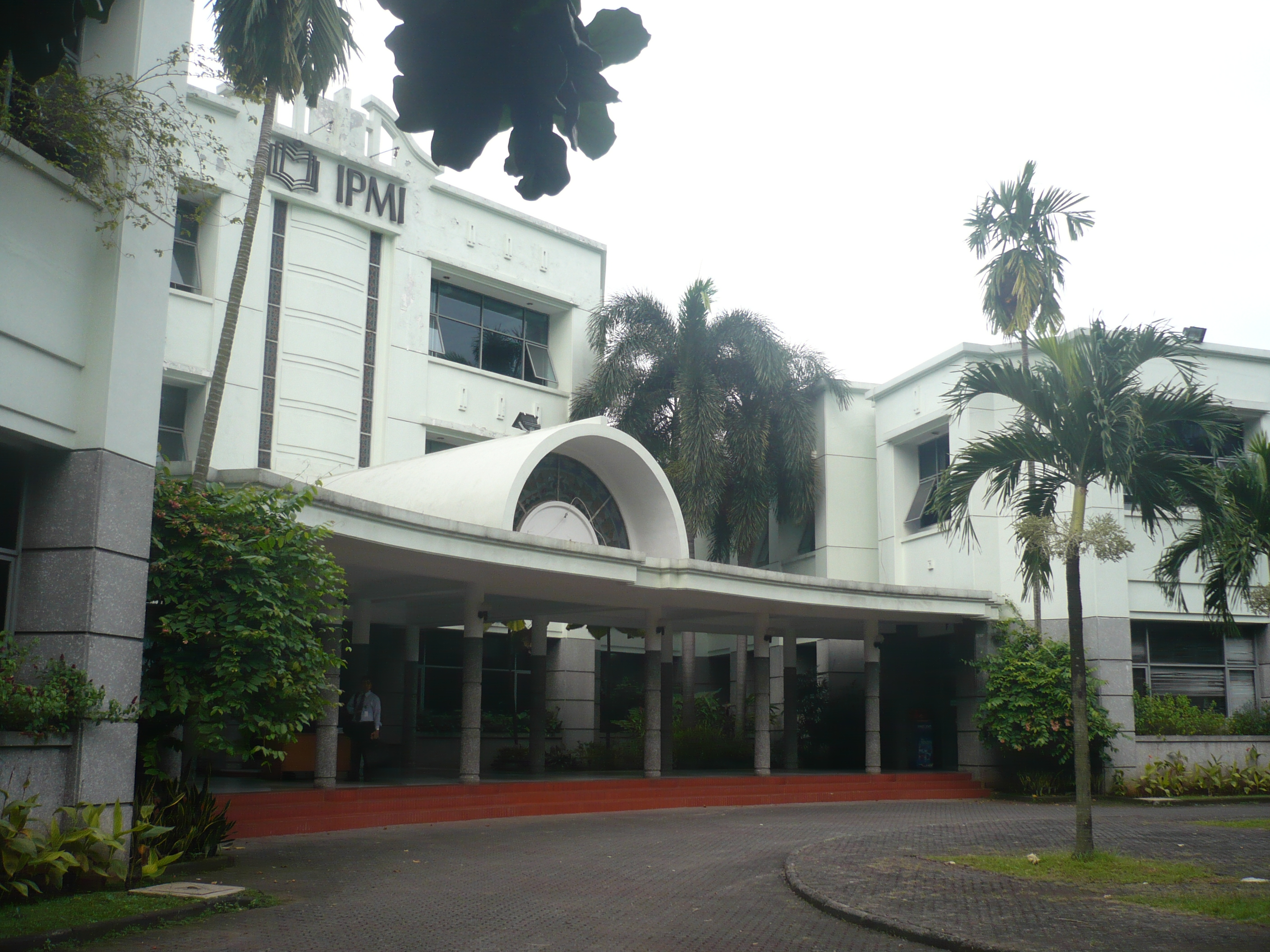
The old building of IPMI International Business School

== History ==
IPMI International Business School was established in 1984 in Indonesia.

The annual joint Advanced Management Program organized in cooperation between IPMI International Business School, Católica Lisbon Business School (Portugal), and Kellogg Business School (USA), running in Jakarta, Lisbon (Portugal), and Chicago (USA), as well as the senior executive education programs with other top universities, have proven that IPMI International Business School’s high quality education meets the international standards.

IPMI International Business School has signed the MOU (Memorandum of Understanding) for double degree partnerships with the following universities: Oulu Business School in Finland (AACSB accredited); Melbourne Business School in Australia (AACSB accredited and MBA program EQUIS accredited); Burgundy School of Business in Dijon, France (AACSB accredited), Audencia Nantes School of Management in France (EQUIS, AACSB and AMBA accredited); and ENPC School of International Management in Paris, France (AMBA accredited).

IPMI International Business School is a member of two key international business school associations; the Association to Advance Collegiate Schools of Business (AACSB) and The Association of MBAs (AMBA).

=== History ===
Indonesia Institute for Management Development (IPMI) was founded in 1984 by Bustanil Arifin with the assistance of some faculty members from the Harvard Business School and the Ivey Business School. Initially, the IPMI offered only a master's degree as its program. In 2003, IPMI offers a Bachelor of Business Administration degree for undergraduates. In 2012, IPMI goes International and changes its name to IPMI International Business School with the motto: Inspiring, Pioneering, Mindshaping, and Impacting.

List of IPMI Presidents:

- Dr. Siswanto Sudoma (1984–1991)
- Ir. Sjoufjan Awal, MM, MSEE, PE. (1991–1994)
- Prof. Dr. Wangiono Ismangil (1994–1999)
- Prof. Dr. Nirwan Idrus (1999–2003)
- Anh Dung, Do, MBA (2003–2004)
- Niclas Adler, PhD, Professor (2012–2014)
- Jimmy M Rifai Gani, MPA (2014–2019)
- Prof. Aman Wirakartakusumah, MSc, PhD (2019 -

== Academics ==
Besides the other programs mentioned, there are other programs such as Executive MM for the post graduates, Certified Management Accountant (CMA) preparatory program, and in-house programs including the Management Development Program and the Professional Development Program. All programs mentioned use Harvard case studies as one of their learning methods. An exchange program is also available for those who desire to study abroad.

=== Programs ===
- Bachelor of Business Administration (BBA Program)
- BBA Professional Class
- Master of Business Administration (MBA Program)
- Executive MBA
- Certified Management Accountant (CMA) Preparatory Program
- In-House Programs
  - Management Development Program
  - Professional Development Program
