= Simone Cipriani =

Italian UN official & administrator (born 1964)

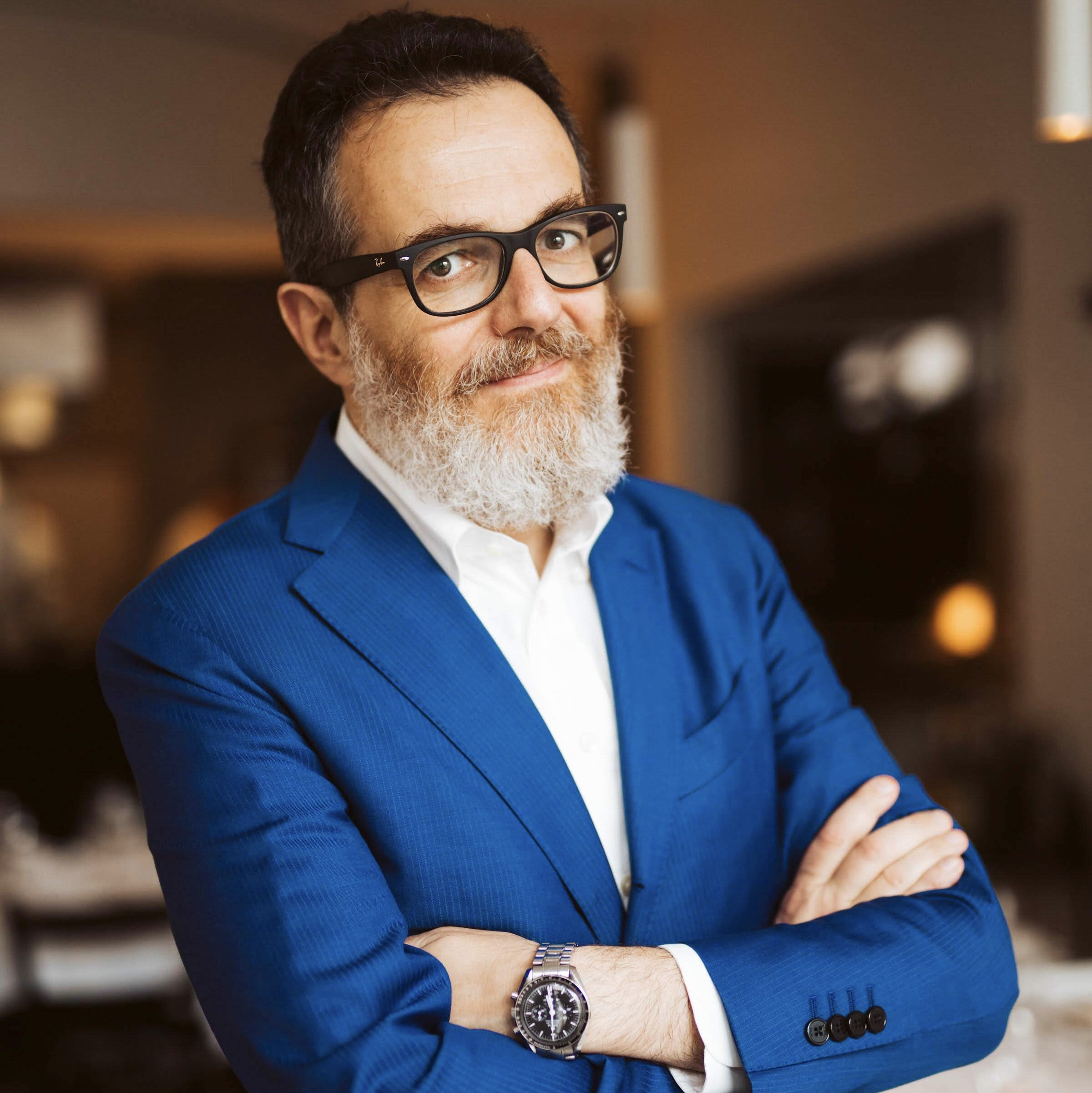
- Born: 1964 (age 61–62); Tuscany, Italy
- Occupations: Teacher and consultant

Simone Cipriani is an Italian educator, consultant and former United Nations officer who founded the Ethical Fashion Initiative at the International Trade Centre (ITC), which is a joint agency of the United Nations and the WTO. He teaches at Sciences Po’s School of Management and Impact and École des Ponts Business School in Paris, and NABA, Nuova Accademia di Belle Arti, in Italy. He also holds a research fellowship at the ReTEch centre of École des Ponts Business School.

Cipriani advises on the development of sustainable businesses and business networks across global fashion value chains. He founded Karibuni Education, an online knowledge platform covering these subjects. He is also an author and a speaker at international conferences.

== Early life and education ==
Cipriani was born in Pistoia, Tuscany, Italy, and completed his studies in political sciences and international economy at the University of Florence.

== Career ==
The idea for The Ethical Fashion Initiative was born when Cipriani was introduced to skilled artisans living in the slums of Nairobi, Kenya. After a successful one-year trial, the Ethical Fashion Initiative became an ongoing United Nations project. The Ethical Fashion Initiative represents a new way of doing business in the fashion sector, making it possible for communities in slums and impoverished rural areas to be part of the international value chain of fashion. It empowers women by generating work, allowing them to become micro-entrepreneurs. This is achieved through a business support infrastructure that facilitates fair collaboration with fashion houses and large distributors. The Ethical Fashion Initiative also supports and promotes emerging design talent from Africa.

Underpinning its success is an economic system designed to work in areas of deprivation. Because of this system of logistics The Ethical Fashion Initiative is able to work over a vast geographical area, both in slums and disadvantaged rural areas. Cipriani is responsible for this system which has been praised by The Economist.

== Personal life ==
Cipriani has three daughters with his wife Stefania Gori. He is connected by marriage to the Collezione Gori of Tuscany, which houses site-specific artworks, including sculptures by Daniel Buren and Sol LeWitt.
