= Celie =

Celie or Célie may refer to:

People

- Pieter Celie (1942–2015), Dutch artist

Fiction

- Celie, character in The Color Purple
- Célie, character in Signor Deluso by Thomas Pasatieri

== See also ==
- Celia (given name)
- Celi (disambiguation)
