= Geoffrey Lewis (scholar) =

English scholar

Geoffrey Lewis CMG FBA
- Born: Geoffrey Lewis Lewis; 19 June 1920; London, England
- Died: 12 February 2008 (aged 87); Summertown, Oxford, England
- Occupation: Turkologist
- Spouse: Raphaela Rhoda Bale Seideman (m. 1941; died 2004)
- Children: 2

Academic background
- Education: University College School
- Alma mater: St John's College, Oxford (BA, DPhil)
- Thesis: "A re-examination of the so-called theology of Aristotle" (1950)
- Academic advisor: H. A. R. Gibb

Academic work
- Institutions: St Antony's College, Oxford
- Notable works: Turkish Grammar (1967)

Geoffrey Lewis Lewis CMG FBA (19 June 1920 – 12 February 2008) was an English Turkologist and the first Professor of Turkish at the University of Oxford. He is known as the author of Teach Yourself Turkish and academic books about Turkish and Turkey.

== Early life and education ==
Lewis was born in London in 1920 and educated at University College School and St John's College, Oxford. He earned an MA in 1945 and a DPhil in 1950 and was the James Mew Arabic Scholar in 1947.

At St John's College, Lewis initially studied Classics. With the outbreak of the Second World War, he served from 1940 to 1945 as a radar operator in the Royal Air Force. Posted primarily in Libya and Egypt, he taught himself Turkish through local Turkish acquaintances, from the Turkish newspaper Yedi Gün available in Cairo, and from Turkish translations of English classics sent to him by his wife. He returned to Oxford in 1945 with his newly acquired interest in Turkish and on the advice of H. A. R. Gibb took a second BA degree in Arabic and Persian as groundwork for Ottoman Turkish, which he finished with first-class honours (not achieved in this double subject since Anthony Eden in 1922) in just two years. He spent six months in Turkey before pursuing his doctoral work on a medieval Arabic philosophical treatise at St John's College.

Turkish was not taught at Oxford before Lewis was appointed to his academic post in 1950; it was through his efforts that it became established in the Oxford syllabus of Oriental studies by 1964.

He was appointed to the chair of Turkish in 1986. He retired in 1987 and was succeeded in the following year by Celia Kerslake.

== Career ==
- Lecturer in Turkish, 1950–54, Senior Lecturer in Islamic Studies, 1954–64, Senior Lecturer in Turkish, 1964–86, University of Oxford
- Fellow, St Antony's College, Oxford, 1961–87
- Visiting Professor: Robert College, Istanbul, 1959–68; Princeton University, 1970–71, 1974; UCLA, 1975
- British Academy Leverhulme Visiting Professor, Turkey, 1984
- Professor of Turkish, University of Oxford, 1986–87

== Honours ==
- Vice-President, 1972–2003, President, 2003–2008, Anglo-Turkish Society
- Turkish Government Certificate of Merit, 1973
- Fellow of the British Academy, 1979
- President, British Society for Middle Eastern Studies, 1981–83 (Award for outstanding contributions for many years to Middle Eastern studies in UK, 2005)
- President, B'nai B'rith Oxford Lodge, 1989
- Turkish Ministry of Foreign Affairs Exceptional Service Plaque, 1991
- Order of Merit of the Republic of Turkey, 1998
- Doctor Honoris Causa from the Istanbul University, 1992 and the Boğaziçi University, 1986
- CMG, 1999
- Gunnar Jarring Lecturer, Stockholm, 2002

== Publications ==
- Teach Yourself Turkish, 1953, 2nd edition 1989
- Modern Turkey, 1955, 4th edition 1974
- (trans., with annotations) Katib Chelebi, The Balance of Truth, 1957
- Plotiniana Arabica, 1959 (based on the doctoral thesis)
- (with Barbara Hodge) A Study in Education for International Misunderstanding (Cyprus School History Textbooks), 1966
- Turkish Grammar, 1967, Second edition 2000. Oxford: Oxford University Press. ISBN 0-19-870036-9.
- (with M. S. Spink) Albucasis on Surgery and Instruments, 1973
- The Book of Dede Korkut, 1974
- The Atatürk I Knew, 1981
- Thickhead and other Turkish Stories, 1988
- Just a Diplomat, 1992
- The Turkish Language Reform: A Catastrophic Success, 1999. Oxford: Oxford University Press
