= Celesta =

Struck idiophone operated by a keyboard

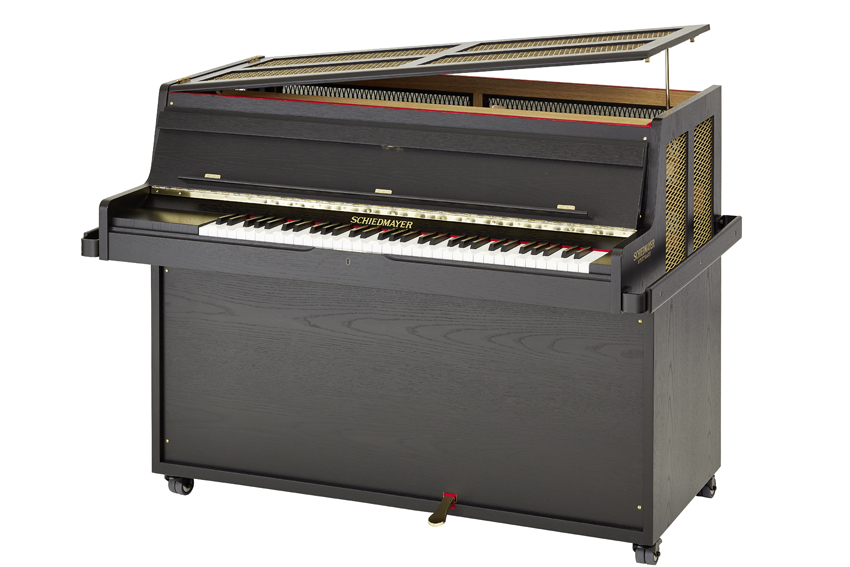

Keyboard instrument
- Other names: Celeste
- Classification: Idiophone; Metallophone
- Hornbostel–Sachs classification: 111.222 (sets of percussion plaques)
- Inventors: Charles Victor Mustel; Auguste Mustel
- Developed: 1860; 1886

Playing range
- C_{3} – F_{8}

Related instruments
- Glockenspiel

Sound sample
- Excerpt from Raymonda by Alexander Glazunov, arranged for solo celesta and performed by Celia García-García

The celesta (/sɪˈlɛstə/) or celeste (/sɪˈlɛst/), also called a bell-piano, is a struck idiophone operated by a keyboard. It looks similar to a four- or five-octave upright piano, albeit with smaller keys and a much smaller cabinet, or a large wooden music box (three-octave). The keys connect to hammers that strike a graduated set of metal (usually steel) plates or bars suspended over wooden resonators. Four- or five-octave models usually have a damper pedal that sustains or damps the sound. The three-octave instruments do not have a pedal because of their small "table-top" design. One of the best-known works that uses the celesta is Pyotr Ilyich Tchaikovsky's "Dance of the Sugar Plum Fairy" from The Nutcracker.

The sound of the celesta is similar to that of the glockenspiel, but with a much softer and more subtle timbre. This quality gave the instrument its name, celeste, meaning "heavenly" in French. The celesta is often used to enhance a melody line played by another instrument or section. Its musical parts are often the duplicate of a theme played on flute, harp or piano; sometimes even a real solo part. It is also used in chamber music, but there are very few concertos written for it. The delicate, bell-like sound is not loud enough to be used in full ensemble sections.

The celesta is a transposing instrument; it sounds one octave higher than the written pitch. Instruments of different sizes exist with ranges of three to five and a half octaves. Its four-octave sounding range is generally considered to be C_{4} to C_{8}. The fundamental frequency of 4186 Hz makes this one of the highest pitches in common use. The original French instrument had a five-octave range, but because the lowest octave was considered somewhat unsatisfactory, it was omitted from later models before eventually being added back when technology improved. The standard French four-octave instrument is gradually being replaced in symphony orchestras by a larger, five-octave German model. Although it is a member of the percussion family, in orchestral terms it is more properly considered a member of the keyboard section and usually played by a keyboardist. The celesta part is normally written on a grand staff.

== History ==
The Mustel celesta mechanism

The celesta was invented in 1886 by the Parisian harmonium builder Auguste Mustel. His father, Charles Victor Mustel, had developed the forerunner of the celesta, the typophone, in 1860. This instrument produced sound by striking tuning forks instead of the metal plates that would be used in the celesta. The dulcitone functioned identically to the typophone and was developed concurrently in Scotland; it is unclear whether their creators were aware of one another's instrument. The typophone's and dulcitone's uses were limited by its low volume, too quiet to be heard in a full orchestra.

Abbreviated concert performance of Dance of the Sugar Plum Fairy by the orchestra of the Moscow Conservatory

Pyotr Ilyich Tchaikovsky is usually cited as the first major composer to use this instrument in a work for full symphony orchestra. He first used it in his symphonic poem The Voyevoda, Op. posth. 78, premiered in November 1891. The following year, he used the celesta in passages of his ballet The Nutcracker (Op. 71, 1892), most notably in the Variation de la Fée Dragée (commonly known as the Dance of the Sugar Plum Fairy), in response to instructions from the Balletmaster Marius Petipa that the music should resemble "...drops of water shooting out of fountains...".

However, Ernest Chausson preceded Tchaikovsky by employing the celesta in December 1888 in his incidental music, written for a small orchestra, for La tempête (a French translation by Maurice Bouchor of William Shakespeare's The Tempest).

The celesta is also notably used in Gustav Mahler's Symphony No. 6, particularly in the 1st, 2nd and 4th movements, in his Symphony No. 8 and Das Lied von der Erde. Karol Szymanowski featured it in his Symphony No. 3. Gustav Holst employed the instrument in his 1918 orchestral work The Planets, particularly in the final movement, Neptune, the Mystic. It also features prominently in Béla Bartók's 1936 Music for Strings, Percussion and Celesta. Ottorino Respighi included it in a number of his works, particularly the "Roman triptych" of tone poems. George Gershwin included a celesta solo in the score to An American in Paris. Ferde Grofe also wrote an extended cadenza for the instrument in the third movement of his Grand Canyon Suite. Dmitri Shostakovich included parts for celesta in seven out of his fifteen symphonies, with a notable use in the fourth symphony's coda. Erich Wolfgang Korngold featured it in many of his works, from Marietta's lied in act 1 of his opera Die tote Stadt, through his film career, to his Violin Concerto (particularly in the second movement), and beyond.

Twentieth-century American composer Morton Feldman used the celesta in many of his large-scale chamber pieces such as Crippled Symmetry and For Philip Guston, and it figured in much of his orchestral music and other pieces. In some works, such as "Five Pianos" one of the players doubles on celesta.

The celesta is used in Carl Orff's cantata Carmina Burana (1936), and in some 20th-century operas such as the Silver Rose scene in Der Rosenkavalier (1911).

The keyboard glockenspiel part in Mozart's The Magic Flute is nowadays often played by a celesta. However, the sound of a keyboard glockenspiel is quite different simply because of its construction and method of sound production and cannot be compared to that of a celesta. Furthermore, the celesta was not invented by Mustel more than 100 years after Mozart’s death. In this respect, the use of a celesta in The Magic Flute constitutes a serious misinterpretation of the work.

== Use in other musical genres ==
=== Jazz ===
Since Earl Hines took it up in 1928, other jazz pianists have occasionally used the celesta as an alternative instrument. In the 1930s, Fats Waller sometimes played celesta with his right hand and piano simultaneously with his left hand. Other notable jazz pianists who occasionally played the celesta include Memphis Slim, Meade "Lux" Lewis, Willie "The Lion" Smith, Art Tatum, Duke Ellington, Thelonious Monk, Buddy Greco, Oscar Peterson, McCoy Tyner, Sun Ra, Keith Jarrett, and Herbie Hancock. A celesta provides the introduction to Someday You'll Be Sorry, a song Louis Armstrong recorded for RCA, and is featured prominently throughout the piece. A celesta is used by the pianist Russ Freeman on tracks from Chet Baker Sings (such as My Ideal and I Get Along Without You Very Well (Except Sometimes)).

A number of jazz ballads feature the instrument, such as recordings Frank Sinatra made for Columbia or The Pied Pipers in the 1940s (for instance I'll Never Smile Again and for the latter Dream), as do many of his albums recorded for Capitol in the 1950s (In the Wee Small Hours, Close to You and Songs for Swingin' Lovers).

The use of celesta in jazz rapidly declined with the advent of the vibraphone.

=== Rock and pop ===
Notable pop and rock songs recorded with the celesta include:

- "Ain't No Mountain High Enough" by Marvin Gaye and Tammi Terrell
- "Ain't No Rest for the Wicked" by Cage the Elephant
- "Jethro Tull – The String Quartets" by Jethro Tull
- "Rhythm of the Rain" by The Cascades
- "As If You Read My Mind" by Stevie Wonder
- "Everyday" by Buddy Holly
- "Baby It's You" as recorded by The Beatles
- "Girl Don't Tell Me" by The Beach Boys
- "Cherish" by The Association
- "Sunday Morning" and "Stephanie Says" by The Velvet Underground
- "Wee Baby Blues" by Climax Blues Band
- "Northern Sky" by Nick Drake
- "Maggie May" and "Mine for Me" by Rod Stewart
- "New York City" by Owl City
- "Penetration" by The Stooges
- "Novocaine for the Soul", "Flyswatter", "Trouble with Dreams" and many other songs by Eels
- "Every Single Night" by Fiona Apple
- "Tarkus" by Emerson, Lake & Palmer
- "Here Today" by Illinois Speed Press
- "Love is a Beautiful Thing" by Vulfpeck
- "Queen of Them All" by Crosby, Stills, Nash & Young
- "Wuthering Heights" by Kate Bush
- "Lost Track" by HAIM (band)
- "Figure of Eight" by Paul McCartney
- "Too Much Sea Between Us" by Procol Harum
- "Bells of the Evening" by Gordon Lightfoot (celesta played by Nick DeCaro)
- "Love Makes the World Go Round" by Deon Jackson
- "Set the Controls for the Heart of the Sun" by Pink Floyd
- "Vespertine" album by Björk
- "La marche de l'empereur" by Émilie Simon

Icelandic band Sigur Rós included celesta on their album Takk..., as did lead singer Jónsi on Go Quiet, the acoustic version of his solo album Go. Steven Wilson also uses it on various tracks in his solo works.

The Italian 1970s progressive rock band Celeste was named after the instrument.

Bruce Springsteen and the E Street Band used a celesta heavily in their early days, with Danny Federici often playing a Jenco Celestette in the band's live performances throughout the 1970s and 80s.

Sheryl Crow plays celesta on her 2017 album, Be Myself.

The band A-ha used, among other instruments, a Jenco celesta during their MTV Unplugged: Summer Solstice performances, recorded and released in 2017.

=== Soundtrack ===
The celesta has been common in cinema for decades. In addition to supplementing numerous soundtrack orchestrations for films from the 1930s through to the 1960s, the celesta has occasionally been spotlighted to invoke a whimsical air. For example, in Pinocchio (1940), a small motif on the celesta is used whenever the Blue Fairy appears out of thin air or performs magic. Celesta also provides the signature opening of Pure Imagination, a song (sung by Gene Wilder) from the 1971 film Willy Wonka & the Chocolate Factory. Composer John Williams's scores for the first three Harry Potter films feature the instrument, particularly in the first two films' frequent statements of "Hedwig's Theme".

Another use of the celesta was in the music on the children's television series Mister Rogers' Neighborhood. It was heard in the intro to the theme song of the programme, "Won't You Be My Neighbor", which began with a dreamy sequence on the instrument. The song was sung by Fred Rogers and played by Johnny Costa. It was also used from time to time in other music sequences throughout the programme.

== Manufacturers ==
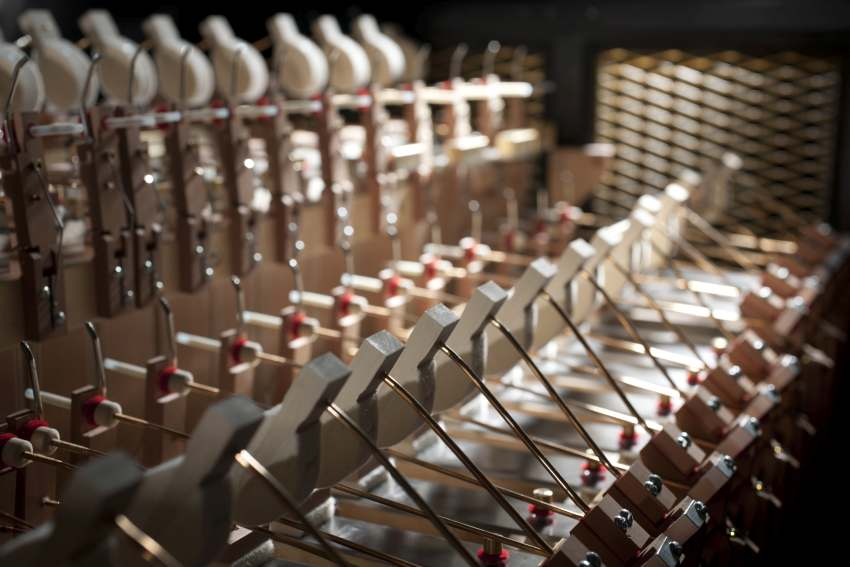
Inside view of a celesta

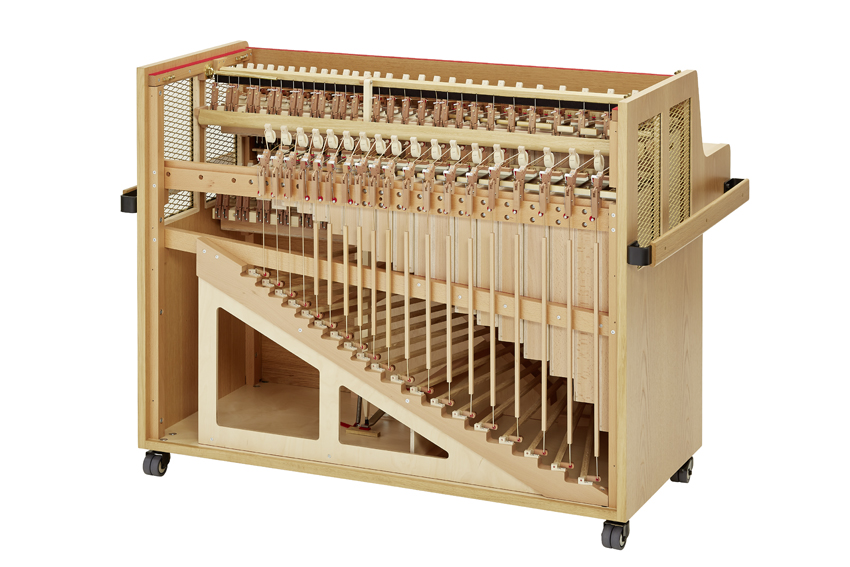
Celesta with back cover removed

Schiedmayer and Yamaha are the only companies currently making celestas. Other known manufacturers that made celestas in the past include:

- Mustel & Company (Paris, France)
- Simone Bros. Celeste MFGS (Philadelphia and New York, US)
- Morley (England)
- Jenco (Decatur, Illinois, US)
- Helmes (New York, US)

== Substitutes ==
If an ensemble or orchestra lacks a celesta, a piano, synthesizer, or sampler and electronic keyboards are often used as a substitute.

== See also ==
- Electric piano
- Voix céleste on organs
