= Bryan Ingham =

English artist (1936–1997)

Bryan Ingham (1936–1997) was an English artist from Yorkshire who specialised in painting, etching and sculpture.

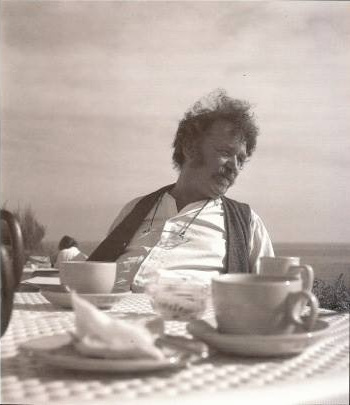
Bryan Ingham at the Lizard, 1994

== Early life ==
Bryan Ingham was born at Preston on 11 June 1936 and raised at Totley in Yorkshire's Calder Valley, in one of its many terraced houses, and the surrounding moorlands, a landscape that profoundly marked his later artistic language. His father George was a sales rep for men's clothing, and his mother Alice took in sewing from time to time when the family finances required. He was unsuccessful academically at school, but had a warm family life; his uncle, Leslie Ingham, who lived for much of the time in the household, gave him an early exposure to and love of literature and music and as a result Ingham became very well read, with a particular zest for and knowledge of poetry.

On leaving school he worked for a time in a department store and acquired an affection for the business's traditional standards and his fellow workers. He was an enthusiastic cricketer and had a trial for Yorkshire; it was he said one of his regrets that having been born in a hospital two or three miles into Lancashire he was disqualified from playing for the county but as he was not selected this remained purely a sentiment. His affection for his Yorkshire roots never left him.

For his National Service he joined the RAF, and spent his time in Germany as an airman employed in a number of what he regarded as tedious tasks before ending up in charge of the stores at RAF Celle under a laissez-faire sergeant, where he became an enthusiastic operator of the ways and means act. On demob, his final report said "Ingham is an artistic sort of airman." In his spare time he had started painting in oils, and by the time he left the RAF he had completed a large number of paintings.

== Career ==
On his return from Germany, he announced to his parents that he intended to become a painter and his father's delight on thinking that he intended to be a painter and decorator was short-lived, to be replaced by bemused acceptance. Despite their misgivings, his parents supported Ingham staunchly through his early and later career, and his father's allowance paid Ingham's rent right through his college career.

=== Training and teaching ===
He went up to London's St Martin's School of Art, where he had the tuition of a fine post-war generation of teachers who helped him to hone his draughtsmanship and other skills, and he swiftly showed a capacity for painting that drew the attention of his tutors and peers. On graduating he was offered and accepted a post-graduate place at the Royal College of Art, where in his second year he was awarded a Royal Scholarship and was a contemporary of a number of now better-known names including David Hockney. He was establishing a reputation for bolshiness with his teachers, and in later years he admitted, a degree of arrogance. It did not stop his talent being appreciated by the staff including his director Carel Weight.

It was at the RSA that he made his first acquaintance with etching. Ingham was to become one of the most notable etchers of the second half of the 20th century, remarkable for the size and quality of his plates, which he often attacked in a style he called "quarrying." He was by then established himself in a fine studio in Fournier St, off Brick Lane and teaching part of the time at Maidstone College of Art, enjoying among others the company of Quentin Crisp, who was a life model there at the time, particularly on the train journeys up and down from London.

=== Travels in Italy ===
Ingham had been fascinated by Italy since his youth, undeterred by an early and disastrous visit with Leslie, who during the trip started the descent into the madness that ultimately led to his suicide. Ingham applied for and received a Leverhulme travel award to explore the sites of the great Renaissance painters, and spent many happy months engaged in this expedition, and as a parenthesis turned up at the English Art school in Rome, where he lived well and busied himself the same studio that Barbara Hepworth had used.

=== Settling in Cornwall ===
At this stage of his career, Ingham consciously rejected the prospect of pursuing a career as an establishment artist, although the RA was open to him, and he went to live in remote cottage on the west side of Predannack Airfield on The Lizard, a location yards from the cliffs and devoid of electricity and running water. He was to keep the cottage for the rest of his life.

The subsequent years were varied and highly productive, and Ingham's personal artistic voice emerged in his oeuvre in the form of an always-developing dialogue with influences both of landscape and other artists of every age. His preoccupation with etching resulted in several hundred plates, some very large, and the results are as unmistakable as they are varied, but invariably of outstanding quality. He produced a number of sculptures in bronze and in plaster, while his lifelong output of paintings remained small but again of very high quality.

He taught etching regularly until about 5 years before his death, latterly at Falmouth Art School, and also at Farnham Art College. His trips to London, always dapper in country suit and bow-tie, on selling expeditions, were usually successful and always convivial, ritually ending with a very hot curry and the sleeper back to Penzance.

Ingham was a raconteur and had a facility for friendship surprising for one who led what was for the most part a reclusive life. He had many love affairs over the years, two of which were long-term relationships and he was married in 1989 (marriage dissolved 1994) to Aysel Özakın, a writer and poet of Turkish/British nationality, who figures in a number of his etchings and portraits of the period. The earlier of these relationships, with Stella Benjamin, brought him over to St Ives where for some years he had a studio in Back Road West. He always retained his Lizard retreat, and indeed for a long time his Fournier St studio.

=== German connection ===
In the late 80s a chance meeting on the Lizard coast path with some German visitors, Sigrid and Uwe Martin, resulted in an invitation to spend time on a bursary on the north German coast at Worpswede, where he felt very much at home and to which he returned regularly thereafter. His new friends persuaded him to undergo surgery to improve his lifelong deafness. The success of this resulted, among other benefits, in a new foray into colour in his work. His stays here stimulated him to produce much fine work including for the first time a number of collages. His work was admired in Germany and he was always sure of regular and lucrative informal shows there. The Kunsthalle held an exhibition of his work.

=== Later life and death ===
During the late eighties he established a relationship with Francis Graham-Dixon, the art dealer, who at that time had a London gallery. This meant that his paintings were professionally marketed for the first time, and prices for his work rose steadily in the last ten years of his life, and subsequently. He purchased a cottage in Helston for his parents, who lived there until their deaths. His friendship with Josephine Gooden resulted in his conversion of a barn adjoining her Lizard farmhouse and he lived there for some years in more comfort than in his cottage which he nonetheless always retained. He moved from there into a fine set of barn-type studios with a patch of garden, a former orchard, quietly situated off the High St in Helston, and it was here, on 22 September 1997, that he died, having stoically endured cancer for nearly a year.

His paintings are in many public and private collections in the UK, Germany and elsewhere.

During his final six months he recorded a memoir and artistic testament in the course of a number of conversations. These include an remarkable disquisition on the craft of the etcher that concludes:

"There is the argument that by going down many false paths one has enriched one's vocabulary, if only minimally, but positively enriched it. That is one reason why the best of my later etchings are strong. And inimitable, because nobody else has gone up and down those various pathways. Because most people have chosen to stick to just one pathway, not the pathways of construction, collage, oil painting, drawing, etching lithograph and of their various components. I've been up and down a hell of a lot of pathways. If one had another lifetime, another sixty years, to work, one would certainly do startling work. But it's taken all of that time just to arrive at the beginning. I feel that about my etching. I feel that about my painting, and to a lesser extent about my sculpture. Well, that's an apprenticeship, and a good apprenticeship. But should an apprenticeship last 45 years?"
