= Celia Jiménez =

Celia Jiménez may refer to:

- Celia Jiménez (footballer) (born 1995), Spanish footballer
- Celia Jiménez (chef) (born 1976), Spanish chef
