= Celia Williamson =

American researcher and community advocate

Celia Williamson is an American University of Toledo Distinguished Professor of Social Work and Executive Director of the Human Trafficking and Social Justice Institute, as well as researcher and community advocate who seeks to combat domestic human trafficking and prostitution. She was named the 26th most influential social worker alive today.

In 2022, Dr. Williamson became a member of the G100 serving as one of the global 100 women changing the world. She serves as the global wing against human trafficking. Williamson is the founder of the Second Chance program, the Lucas County Human Trafficking Coalition, Chaired the Research and Analysis State Trafficking Commission, and is a founding member and President of the Global Association of Human Trafficking Scholars.

She has written extensively on issues of domestic minor sex trafficking and adult prostitution in the U.S.

== Biography ==
Williamson received her bachelor's degree in Social Work from the University of Toledo, her master's degree in Social Work from Case Western Reserve University and her Ph.D. from Indiana University School of Social Work.

== Community work and activism ==
Williamson started her career as a social worker at a community center in north Toledo working with children and families. While driving into work every day she would see women on the street involved in prostitution. She spent six months on the street building relationships, interviewing women, and immersing herself into the culture. After six months she built the first direct service anti-trafficking program in Ohio. with initial funding from the United Methodist Church and the City of Toledo, Williamson conducted street outreach on the streets of Toledo and in jails, facilitated groups, and advocated for women and youth. She went on to win grants and bring funding to the Toledo community to provide program and services for sex trafficking victims. In 2017 the program changed its name to RISE.

After receiving her PhD, she returned to the Toledo community to build a thriving anti-trafficking coalition and serve Chair of the Research and Analysis Committee of the State's Anti-trafficking Coalition. In 2015, Williamson became the Executive Director of the Human Trafficking and Social Justice Institute at the University of Toledo. She has been hosting an annual International Human Trafficking and Social Justice Conference at the University of Toledo since 2004. She also founded the Lucas County Human Trafficking Coalition, which includes local criminal justice, social service, and health care agencies, along with businesses, university members, churches, citizens, and adult survivors, and the FBI Innocence Lost Task Force.

In 1993, Williamson founded Second Chance, an organization that develops individualized service plans for women and children survivors and victims in Toledo, Ohio.

In 2009, Williamson and others founded the Lucas County Human Trafficking Coalition.

Williamson has also been active in advocating for legislation surrounding sex trafficking on a state level. She supported and advocated for all of the anti-trafficking bills passed in Ohio.

Under the direction of Representative Teresa Fedor and the Ohio Attorney General, Williamson became a founding member of the Ohio Human Trafficking Commission and currently serves as the Chair of the Research and Analysis Committee of the Commission.

== Research ==
The majority of Williamson's research is on sex trafficking and prostitution. Her research has focused on examining victims' experiences, as well as working to create promising practices and evidence-based models of prevention for high-risk youth and quality intervention with victims. Williamson has been funded by the Department of Justice and/or National Institutes of Health for ten consecutive years from 2002 to 2012. She has since been funded by the State of Ohio and various local and national foundations.

Her 2010 study, entitled "Exiting Prostitution: An Integrated Model", focused specifically on the challenges encountered by women attempting to exit the commercial sex industry. Her 2009 study, "Domestic Minor Sex Trafficking: A Network of Underground Players in the Midwest" explored women's experiences with: (a) violence, (b) HIV risks and condom use, (c) emotional and physical health, (d) substance use, (e) home life and street life, and (f) experiences with local 130 systems including the juvenile justice system, the social service system, and the health care system. A 2002 study by Williamson entitled "Pimp-Controlled Prostitution" focused on understanding the traditional pimp-prostitute relationship through qualitative research.

Williamson has conducted some groundbreaking research in area of human trafficking and has published over 25 articles and reports. Some of her latest work involves the creation of an 8-topic curriculum for youth at risk for sex and/or labor trafficking. Williamson also has a popular podcast called "Emancipation Nation" and an online network of anti-trafficking advocates called the "Emancipation Nation Network".

== Human Trafficking and Social Justice ==
The Human Trafficking and Social Justice Conference is the oldest academic conference on human trafficking in the nation. Started in 2004, the annual conference has hosted representatives from 42 states and 30 countries. An average of 1,400 people attended the conference, 400 of which are high school students. The two days conference hosts an average of 90 presenters. http://www.traffickingconference.com

Dr. Williamson also hosts the Emancipation Nation Podcast available wherever you get your podcasts.

She founded and hosts the Emancipation Nation Network, a free online network of anti-trafficking advocates from around the world. The Network offers a daily updated host of information on anti-trafficking focused grants, jobs, free webinars, and the latest research. Members have access to message each other and collaborate.

== Awards and recognitions ==
In 2014, Williamson was named the 26th most influential social worker alive today by the Social Work Degree Guide, based on merit, scholastic study, and political activism. In 2009, Williamson was inducted into the Ohio Women's Hall of Fame for her work on sex trafficking and prostitution issues throughout Ohio. In 2009, Second Chance, founded by Williamson, received the FBI Director's Community Leadership Award for its efforts.

== Literary contributions ==
=== Books ===
- Dalla, R., Baker, L., DeFrain, J., & Williamson, C. (Eds.) (2011). The Prostitution of Women, Men and Children: Africa, Middle East, Asia, and Oceania. Landham MD: Lexington Publishers, Inc.
- Dalla, R., Baker, L., DeFrain, J., & Williamson, C. (2011). The Prostitution of Women, Men and Children: North America, Latin America, Europe, and Global. Landham MD: Lexington Publishers, Inc.

=== Articles ===
- Fedina, L., Perdue, T., Bright, C.L., Williamson, C., (2018). An ecological analysis of risk for runaway behavior among individuals involved in commercial sexual exploitation. Submitted to Journal of Aggression, Maltreatment, and Trauma
- Fedina, L., Williamson, C., & Perdue, T., (2016). Risk factors for domestic child sex trafficking in the U.S., Journal of Interpersonal Violence. doi:10.1177/0886260516662306
- Perdue, T., Prior, M., & Williamson, C., Sherman, S. (2012). Social justice and spiritual healing: Using micro and macro social work practice to reduce domestic minor sex trafficking. Social Work and Christianity, 39(4), pages 449-465
- Karadinkar, S. & Williamson, C. (2011). Report on the prevalence of human trafficking in Ohio to Attorney General Richard Cordray. Trends in Organized Crime. 13, pages 192-218
- Perdue, T. R., Williamson, C., Ventura, L., Hairston, T., Osborne, L.C., Laux, J.M., Moe, J.L., Dupuy, P.J., Benjamin, B.J., Lambert, E.G., Cox, J.A., Nathan, V.M. (2011). Offenders who are mothers with and without experience in prostitution: Differences in historical trauma, current stressors, and physical and mental health differences. Women's Health Issues
- Perdue, T., Williamson, C., Billings, M., Schart, J., Boston-Gromer, R. In the matter of human trafficking in Ohio: The pursuit of justice continues (2011) Women's Policy Journal of Harvard, 8(3).
- Laux, J.M., Calmes, S., Moe, J.L., DuPuy, P., Cox, J., Ventura, L., Williamson, C., Benjamin, B., & Lambert, E., (2011). The clinical mental health counseling needs of mothers in the criminal justice system. The Family Journal: Counseling and Therapy for Couples and Families, 19(3), pages 291-298
- Laux, J.M., Calmes, S., Moe, J.L., DuPuy, P., Cox, J., Ventura, L., Williamson, C., Benjamin, B., & Lambert, E., (2011). The career counseling needs of mothers in the criminal justice system. Journal of Offender Rehabilitation, 50(3).
- Baker, L., Dalla, R., & Williamson, C., (2010). Exiting Prostitution: An Integrated Model. Violence Against Women, 16(5), pages 579-600
- Williamson, C., & Baker, L. (2009). Women in street based prostitution: A Typology of their work styles. Qualitative Social Work 8(1), pages 27–44.
- Williamson, C. & Prior, M. (2009). Domestic minor sex trafficking: A network of underground players in the Midwest. Journal of Child and Adolescent Trauma, 2:1, pages 46–61.
- Williamson, C. & Baker, L. (2008). Helping victims of prostitution and trafficking: It takes a community. Group Work 18(3), pages 8–27
- Baker, L. & Williamson, C., (2008). Prostitute Women Leaving the Streets: An Analysis of Their Accounts Using the Role Exit Model. Submitted (Under Peer Review)
- Williamson, C., Baker, L., Jenkins, M. & Cluse-Tolar, T. (2007). Police-Prostitute Interactions: Sometimes Discretion, Sometimes Misconduct. Journal of Progressive Human Services. Volume 18(2)
- Williamson, C. (2005). Violence against women in street level prostitution: Women centered community responses. Journal of Advancing Women in Leadership
- Williamson, C. & Folaron, G. (2002). Understanding the experiences of street level prostitutes. Qualitative Social Work, (2)3, pages 271-287.
- Williamson, C. & Cluse-Tolar, T. (2002). Pimp-controlled prostitution: Still an integral part of street life. Violence Against Women, 8(9), pages 1075-1093.
- Williamson, C. & Folaron, G. (2001). Violence, risk and survival strategies of street prostitution. Western Journal of Nursing Research, 23(5), pages 463-475.
- Williamson, C. (2007). Decriminalization of prostitution. Encyclopedia of Interpersonal Violence. Thousand Oaks, California: Sage.
- Williamson, C. (2007). Abolitionist approach to prostitution. Encyclopedia of Interpersonal Violence. Thousand Oaks, California: Sage.
- Williamson, C. (2006) Review of the Book Listening to Olivia: Violence, Poverty and Prostitution, Journal of the National Women's Studies Association, Volume 18(1)
- Baker, L. & Williamson, C. (2005). [Review of the Book: Sex trafficking: The global market in women and children]. Violence Against Women, 11.
- Williamson, C. & Cluse-Tolar, T. (2008) Pimp-controlled prostitution: Still and integral part of street life. In P. Adler & P. Adler (Ed.) Constructions of Deviance, Wadsworth Publishing: Belmont, California (Reprint from an earlier version)
- Williamson, C. (2005). Appalachian women and poverty: Work in the underground economy. In Englehardt, E. Race, Class, Gender and Mountains: Voices of Appalachian Women. Ohio University Press. Book Chapter.

=== Encyclopedia contributions and book reviews ===
- Williamson, C. (2008). Decriminalization of Prostitution. Encyclopedia of Interpersonal Violence. Sage Publications
- Williamson, C. (2008). Abolitionist Approach to Prostitution. Encyclopedia of Interpersonal Violence. Sage Publications
- Williamson, C. (2006) Review of the Book Listening to Olivia: Violence, Poverty and Prostitution, Journal of the National Women's Studies Association, Volume 18(1)
- Baker, L. & Williamson, C. (2005). [Review of the Book: Sex trafficking: The global market in women and children]. Violence Against Women, 11.

=== Programmatic articles ===
- Williamson, C., (2008). Preliminary Findings on Child Sex Trafficking in Toledo. Available at: http://www.secondchancetoledo.org
- Fedina, L., Trease, J., Williamson, C. (2008). Human Trafficking Guide for Social Service Providers. Available at: http://www.secondchancetoledo.org

=== State and federal reports ===
- Williamson, C., Kennedy, E., Vandenberghe, E., Wickerham, A., Belton, L., Williams, F.; Burns, D., & Long, K. (2018). A Guide to Develop, Implement, and Evaluate Human Trafficking Prevention for Youth in Your Community.
- Williamson, C., Sieben, S., Adams, P., Jordan, K. (2017). Assessment of Human Trafficking Tool. For Ohio Human Trafficking Task Force.
- Adams, J. Long, K., Wickerham A.Riggs, N. & Williamson, C., Health Care Access Now (HCAN) Cincinnati Pathways Project Quarterly Reports 2016-2018
- Sieben, S., Flores T., Schramm, A. & Williamson, C. Franklin County Pathways Community Hub Quarterly Reports 2016-2018.
- Belton, L, Schramm, A., & Williamson, C., Healthy Start Annual Reports 2014- 2018
- Schramm, A. & Williamson, C., Lucas County Initiative to Improve Birth Outcomes Toledo Pathways Project. Quarterly Reports 2013-2018
- Williamson, C., Perdue, T., Belton, L., & Burns, O. (2012). Domestic sex trafficking in Ohio. Ohio Human Trafficking Commission, pages 1–28
- Williamson, C., Karandikar-Chheda, Perdue, T., Barrows, J., Smouse, T.... (2010). Ohio Trafficking in Persons Study Commission Research and Analysis Sub-Committee Report on the Prevalence of Human Trafficking in Ohio. Ohio Attorney General's Trafficking in Persons Commission.

=== Book chapters ===
- Williamson, C. & Cluse-Tolar, T. (2006) Pimp-controlled prostitution: Still and integral part of street life. In P. Adler & P. Adler (Ed.) Constructions of Deviance, Wadsworth Publishing: Belmont, California (in all 8 editions)
- Williamson, C. (2005). Appalachian women and poverty: Work in the underground economy. In Englehardt, E. Race, Class, Gender and Mountains: Voices of Appalachian Women. Ohio University Press. Book Chapter.

=== Conference proceedings ===
- Williamson, C. (2004). Police-prostitute interactions: Discretion or misconduct Proceedings from the National Conference on Prostitution, Sex Work and the Commercial Sex Industry: The State of Women's Health, University of Toledo
- Williamson, C. & Beech, K. (2004). Street level prostitution: A typology of women. Proceedings from the National Conference on Prostitution, Sex Work and the Commercial Sex Industry: The State of Women's Health, University of Toledo
- Williamson, C. (2003). From the hollow to the hood: Life in inner city prostitution. Proceedings of The Women of Appalachia Conference, Ohio University.
- Williamson, C. (2000). Appalachian women & poverty: work in the underground economy. Proceedings of The Women of Appalachia Conference, 2000, Ohio University pages 160–171.

=== Dissertation ===
- Williamson, C. (2000). Entrance, maintenance, and exit: The socio-economic influences and cumulative burdens of female street prostitution. (Doctoral Dissertation, Indiana University, 2000). Dissertation Abstracts International, 61(02) Publication # AAT-9962789.
