= Celia Kerslake =

British Turkologist (1946–2023)

- Born: 1946; London
- Died: 7 February 2023 (aged 76–77)

Academic background
- Education: St Paul's Girls' School
- Alma mater: Girton College, Cambridge (BA); St Anne's College, Oxford (DPhil)
- Thesis: "A Critical Edition and Translation of the Introductory Sections and the First Thirteen Chapters of the Selīmnāme of Celālzāde Muṣṭafā Çelebi" (1975)
- Doctoral advisor: Richard C. Repp

Academic work
- Institutions: University of Edinburgh (1980–88); University of Oxford (1988–2011)
- Main interests: Turkish language; Turkish literature; Intellectual history
- Notable works: Turkish: A Comprehensive Grammar (with Aslı Göksel)

Celia Kerslake (1946–7 February 2023) was a British Turkologist. She was the University Lecturer in Turkish and a Fellow of St Antony's College at the University of Oxford (1988–2011). She is known as the author of Turkish: A Comprehensive Grammar (2005) and Turkish: An Essential Grammar (2011), both written jointly with Aslı Göksel.

== Education ==
Kerslake attended St Paul's Girls' School in Hammersmith, West London. She was admitted to read history at the University of Cambridge in 1965, but was inspired in her second month of studies by Susan Skilliter to change her subject to Turkish and Arabic, and graduated with a Double First in Oriental Studies from Girton College. She pursued her DPhil at St Anne's College, Oxford from 1968, preparing a critical edition and translation of the first part of the history of Ottoman Sultan Selim I's reign (1512–20) written by the retired head of chancery (nişancı) Celalzade Mustafa Çelebi (de) (1490/1–1567).

== Career ==
After completing her doctorate Kerslake held research fellowships at New Hall, Cambridge and Lady Margaret Hall, Oxford. She was appointed to a lectureship in Turkish at the University of Edinburgh in 1980. In October 1988, she succeeded Geoffrey Lewis as the University Lecturer in Turkish at the University of Oxford and held the position until her retirement in 2011. She was a member of the Faculty of Asian and Middle Eastern Studies and a Fellow of St Antony's College where she served as Senior Tutor and Tutor for Admissions during the 1990s. She taught Turkish language, language politics, literary texts, and history since the 19th century.

She was Chair of the British Association of Turkish Area Studies (BATAS) from 2010 to 2023. Among her publications are entries contributed to the Encyclopedia of Islam. She translated Aysel Özakın's 1980 novel Genç Kız ve Ölüm into English (The Prizegiving, The Women's Press, 1988).

== Personal life and public involvement ==
In her youth, Celia Kerslake trained in gymnastics and was involved with the Girl Guides. Later, she became a long-standing member of the Green Party and a campaigner for environmental conservation. She lived in Chipping Norton and served as the membership secretary of the Green Party's West Oxfordshire branch. She kept an active interest in Turkish politics and culture, and spent much of her time in Turkey with her partner for over 50 years, Gülen (d. 2021). She was the eldest of three sisters.
