= Aysel Özakın =

Turkish-British novelist and playwright

Aysel Ozakin
- Occupation: Turkish-British writer

Aysel Ingham (née Özakın, born 1942) is a Turkish-British novelist and playwright. She has written predominantly in English for over 25 years, although she has also published in three other languages (French, Turkish, and German). She also publishes under the names Ada, Anna, or Ana Ingham.

== Career ==
Özakın studied French in Ankara and in Paris, then worked as a lecturer in Istanbul (at Atatürk Egitim Enstitusu, which is now part of Marmara University). Her literary activity was repeatedly praised by literary critics. One example of her sensitive, accurate observational prose is a 1975 Turkish language novel under the title Gurbet Yavrum, which was translated to German in 1987, under the title The Flying Carpet.

Three months after the 1980 Turkish military coup, Aysel Özakın left Turkey to attend the Berlin Literary Colloquium.

Özakin considers herself a universalist writer, whose subject matter and protagonists are increasingly international. Through her work, she has striven to cast off any stereotypical labels that would typically have been placed on her as a female author who works in a multitude of languages, and with characters set within a variety of cultural backdrops.

== Personal life ==
She met her future husband, the English painter and sculptor Bryan Ingham, in Worpswede, Germany. Özakın moved to Cornwall, England in 1988 to escape the limitations of publishing in Germany, and married him in 1989. They lived together there until their separation in 1994, remaining on friendly terms. She has resided in England since then, and writes her works solely in English.

== Bibliography ==
- 1975 Gurbet Yavrum (Novel); E. Publishers, Istanbul
  - German edition 1987: Rowohlt, Reinbek
  - Dutch edition 1988: Ambo, Deh Baarn
- 1976 Sessiz Bir Dayanisma (Short Stories); E. Publishers, Istanbul
- 1978 Alninda Mavi Kuslar (Novel); E. Publishers, Istanbul
- 1980 Genç Kız ve Ölüm (Novel); Yazko, Istanbul
  - German Edition 1982, Buntbuch Verlag, Hamburg
  - Dutch edition 1984; Schaloom, Amsterdam
  - English edition 1988 (tr. Celia Kerslake); Women's Press, London
  - German edition reprinted 1989 Luchterhand, Frankfurt am Main
- 1981 Sessiz Bir Dayanisma (Short Stories); Yazko, Istanbul
- 1981 Soll Ich alt werden, German edition 1983. Buntbuch Verlag, Hamburg
- 1981 Turken in Deutschland 1984. Goldmann, München
  - Greek edition 1983. Theoria, Athens
- 1984 Die leidenschaft der anderen (Novella); Buntbuch Verlag, Hamburg
- 1985 Das Lacheln des Benwubsein (Short Stories); Buntbuch Verlag, Hamburg
  - Dutch edition 1986; Sjaloom, Amsterdam
- 1986 Du bist willkommen (Poems)
- 1986 Hosgeldin Dagyeli Buntbuch Verlag, Hamburg
- 1987 Zart erhob sich bis sie flog (Poems); Am Galgenberg, Hamburg; Buntbuch Verlag, Hamburg
- 1987 Die Blau Vogel auf dem Stirn; Buntbuch Verlag, Hamburg
- 1988 Mavi Maske. Roman Can, Istanbull
  - German edition, 1989. Luchterhand, Frankfurt
  - Dutch edition 1989; Ambo Den Baarn Holland.
- 1989 Selo wants to buy a house (Children book); House de Geus. Holland
- 1991 Glaube Liebe Aircondition (Novel); Luchterhand; Goldmann paperback
- 1993 De taal Van de Bergen (Novel); Ambo Den Baarn Holland
- 1995 Die Zunge der Berge. Luchterhand, Frankfurt
- 1997 Bartelsman (Novel)
- 2000 Three Colours of Love (Three short novels, published under the name Ada Ingham); Waterloo Press, Brighton
- 2004 La Langue des Montagnes; L'Esprit des Peninsules, Paris
- 2007 La Voyage a travers l'oubli (poems published under the name Anna Ingham); La Soicete des Poets Francais
- 2008 4 Plays of Ana Ingham
- 2009 All Dreamers Go to America (Novel, published under the name Ana Ingham); Eloqent books/AEG New York. USA
- 2007 Ladder in the moonlight (Novel); Pen Press, Brighton
- 2009 Urgent Beauty (Novel); Eloquent Books/AEG. New York USA
- 2010 Lazy Friends (Novel); Strategic Book Group. USA
