= Qualitative Social Work =

- Discipline: Social Work
- Language: English
- Edited by: Lissette Piedra, Lisa Morriss

Publication details
- History: March 2002-Present
- Publisher: SAGE Publications (United Kingdom)
- Frequency: Quarterly

Standard abbreviations
- ISO 4: Qual. Soc. Work

Indexing
- ISSN: 1473-3250
- OCLC no.: 609948399

Links
- Journal homepage; Online access; Online archive

Qualitative Social Work is a peer-reviewed academic journal that publishes papers six times a year in the field of social work. The journal's founding editors were Roy Ruckdeschel (Saint Louis University) and Ian Shaw (University of York). The current co-editors are Lissette Piedra (University of Illinois Urbana-Champaign) and Lisa Morriss (Lancaster University). The journal has been in publication since 2002 and is currently published by SAGE Publications.

== Scope ==
Qualitative Social Work is primarily aimed at those interested in qualitative research and evaluation and in qualitative approaches to practice. The journal provides a forum for debate on the nature of reflective inquiry and practice, emerging applications of critical realism in social work, the potential of social constructionist and narrative approaches to research and practice.

== Abstracting and indexing ==
Qualitative Social Work is abstracted and indexed in the following databases:

- Academic Search Premier
- Academic Search Complete
- Criminal Justice Abstracts
- PsycINFO
- Public Affairs Index
- Social Care Online
- Social Work Abstracts (Online)
- SocINDEX with Full Text
- SCOPUS
- ZETOC
