= Shiela =

Shiela is a given name. People with that name include:

- Shiela Grant Duff (1913–2004), British author, journalist and foreign correspondent
- Shiela Makoto (born 1990), Zimbabwean association football defender
- Shiela Marie Pineda (born 1991), Filipino volleyball player
- Shiela Mehra, Indian gynaecologist
- Shiela Valderrama (born 1978), Filipino musical theater actress

== See also ==
- Sheela
- Sheila
- Shila (disambiguation)
