= Celia Jiménez (chef) =

Spanish chef (born 1976)

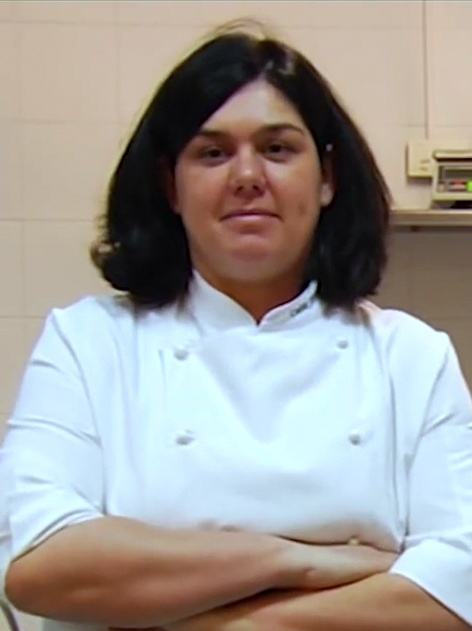
- Born: Celia Jiménez Caballero; February 19, 1976 (age 50); Córdoba, Spain
- Education: La Cónsula de Málaga
- Culinary career
- Cooking style: Andalusian cuisine
- Rating: Michelin stars
- Current restaurant: Restaurant Celia Jiménez
- Previous restaurant: El Lago
- Website: celiajimenez.com

Celia Jiménez Caballero (born 19 February 1976) is a Spanish chef, who when she was head chef at El Lago restaurant became the first female chef in Spain to win a Michelin star.

== Career ==
Celia Jiménez trained at La Cónsula de Málaga, a successful cooking school which went on to produce several Michelin star winning chefs. She said at the time, the expectation on menus was that it would feature staple fine dining dishes such as foie gras, cavier and scallops. While she found that when training there was a better split of male and female chefs, she later said in an interview that over time the number of female chefs declined because of the pressures of leaving work to start a family.

While working as head chef at the restaurant El Lago in Marbella, she won a Michelin star. This was the first time that a female Spanish chef had done so. She found the initial experience after the award to be chaotic, due to the increased expectations of diners and the volume of media requests. After the star was awarded, she continued to modify the menu served, although was not interested in introducing molecular gastronomy elements.

In 2015, she opened her own establishment, Restaurant Celia Jiménez, within a sports complex in Cordoba. While she wished to continue serving fine dining, she also wanted to be accessible. Jiménez incorporated part of her work from her time working on food research at Bodegas Campos, in order to present her own take on modern Andalusian cuisine at the new restaurant. This includes a concentration on promoting the use of jamón ibérico, Iberian ham.
