= Célia Russo =

Founder and first dean of École des Ponts Business School

Célia Russo Chevalier de l’Ordre national du Mérite
- Born: Célia Delia Mireille Russo; July 13, 1944; Guildford, England
- Died: January 3, 1999 (aged 54); Paris, France
- Other names: Célia Delia Tahtagian (née Russo)
- Occupations: Educator and academic administrator
- Known for: Founder, École des Ponts Business School
- Office: Dean, ENPC School of International Management (1987–1999)

Célia Russo (13 July 1944 – 3 January 1999) was a French-Argentine educator and academic administrator, born in Guildford, England. She was also known as Célia Delia Tahtagian. Russo worked at the historic École nationale des ponts et chaussées (founded in 1747 and one of France’s oldest and most prestigious grandes écoles), where she founded the ENPC School of International Management in 1987, today known as École des Ponts Business School, and served as its first dean until her death in 1999. In 1997 she was made a chevalier of the Ordre national du Mérite by President Jacques Chirac.

== Early life and education ==
Russo was born in Guildford, England to a French mother and Argentine diplomat father She grew up in England, Latin America, the United States, and France, and spoke seven languages fluently. In 1971, she received a Fulbright scholarship, followed by a master's degree in Educational Psychology and Curriculum Planning (1972) from the University of Oregon. She earned a PhD from the Sorbonne in 1983 and an MBA from the Institut Supérieur des Affaires (ISA), now part of HEC Paris Executive Education in 1986. Her multicultural background informed her later focus on cross-cultural and international education.

== Early career ==
From 1967 to 1973, Russo served as head of the bilingual Saint-Charles School in Buenos Aires, Argentina. In 1974 she founded the international department at the École Supérieure d’Ingénieurs en Électricité et Électronique (ESIEE) in Paris, where she remained until 1981. At ESIEE she introduced foreign language instruction and intercultural training for engineering students. She was a co-founder of TESOL France in the early 1980s, promoting collaboration among English-language teachers across national and ideological lines.

Russo was a visiting research fellow at MIT, Stanford University, and the University of California, Berkeley. She served as an associate professor at the Conservatoire national des arts et métiers and worked in the international relations office at the Conférence des Grandes Écoles. From 1986 to 1993, she was general delegate of the Franco-Israeli Association for Scientific and Technological Research.

== École nationale des ponts et chaussées ==
In 1980, ENPC director Jacques Tanzi recruited Russo, a non-engineer, foreign, and female candidate, to establish its Department of Languages and International Culture at one of France’s oldest and most prestigious Grandes Écoles, founded in 1747. The decision initially stirred debate among the all-male board, but her successful implementation of the program earned its full support. She served as the department’s first director from 1981 to 1984 and was ENPC’s delegate to the Conférence des grandes écoles from 1982 to 1984. In 1983 she guest-edited a special issue of the European Journal of Engineering Education on international engineering education. In 1987 she founded the ENPC School of International Management.

== ENPC School of International Management ==
Russo proposed creating an international management program within ENPC, a novel idea in France at the time. The ENPC School of International Management was established in 1987 with Russo as its founding dean. The school, later renamed École des Ponts Business School, was the first MBA-granting program embedded in a French civil engineering grande école. Russo designed a flexible MBA curriculum allowing students to tailor their studies through a wide range of electives, conducted in English and taught by an international faculty. In 1988 she launched the Master’s in International Business (MIB) program and served as its president. Her leadership was profiled in Les Échos in 1997 for spearheading ENPC’s strategy of creating spin-off programs and new academic ventures.

In a 1999 message shortly before her death, Russo described the program’s ethos: “Participants become partners in the M.I.B. They design their own curriculum based on their background and aspirations. They negotiate this curriculum with the faculty. They are involved in their own development and that of the M.I.B.” She was also noted internationally for her work in making MBAs accessible to a wider range of candidates, including in The Independent in 1998.

== Educational philosophy ==
Russo believed learners should actively co-create their educational journey. In a 1985 article, she argued that international training should “bring about new understanding and consequent change” in learners. Her 1999 message reiterated this philosophy, emphasising that students must be active partners in shaping their education and development.

== Honours ==
- Vermeil Medal of the Société d’Encouragement au Progrès (1990).
- Chevalier of the Ordre national du Mérite (14 May 1997), awarded by President Jacques Chirac for contributions to higher education.

== Death and legacy ==
Russo died in Paris on 3 January 1999 while serving as dean. Following her death, ENPC named a lecture hall at its Paris campus in her honour and established a scholarship promoting cross-cultural diversity. A 2017 commemorative video by the school recounts her success in convincing the ENPC executive board—then composed almost entirely of French male engineers—to create an international business school, and describes her vision that business should serve human progress and global well-being. Her principles of ethical leadership, cultural diversity, and sustainability remain central to the school’s mission.

== Selected publications ==
- “The European Engineering Programme: A Joint Venture” (1982), European Journal of Education.
- “A Multidimensional Approach to International Training” (1985), European Journal of Engineering Education.
- “Le cycle de formation à l’exportation” (1987), PCM — Le Pont.

== See also ==
- École des Ponts Business School
- École nationale des ponts et chaussées
