= Celia Maestre =

Spanish paralympic athlete (born 1981)

Personal information
- Full name: Celia Maestre Martín
- Nationality: Spanish
- Born: 26 March 1981 (age 45) Valencia

Sport
- Country: Spain
- Sport: Track and field

Celia Maestre Martín (born 26 March 1981) is a Spanish track and field sighted guide and social worker who has represented Spain at the 2004, 2008 and 2012 Summer Paralympics as a guide.

== Personal ==
Maestre was born on 26 March 1981 in Valencia. She is from the Valencia region of Spain. She is married to David Casinos, and is a social worker. The pair were dating in 2004. In 2004, she was a sociology student. In 2012, she lived in Moncada, Valencia.

== Athletics ==
Maestre became David Casinos guide in 2002. She was guide for Casinos at the 2004 Summer Paralympics. At the time, they were dating and broke Paralympic taboo by sharing a room together in the Paralympic village. She was a guide at the 2008 Summer Paralympics in athletics for Casinos, where they won a gold medal. She competed at the 2012 Summer Paralympics as a guide. Spain's 14 strong visually impaired athletics delegation to the London Games participated in a training camp at the Center for Sports Modernization in La Rioja ahead of the Games.
