= Celia Fitzgerald =

- All My Children character
- Portrayed by: Jordan Lane Price
- First appearance: April 29, 2013
- Last appearance: September 2, 2013
- Created by: Marlene McPherson; Elizabeth Snyder
- Introduced by: Ginger Smith
In-universe information
- Occupation: Student; Executive Assistant to Dimitri Marick at "Talk Tempo"; Volunteer at the Miranda Montgomery Center for Women and Children

Celia Fitzgerald is a fictional character from The Online Network reboot of soap opera drama series All My Children. Celia has been portrayed by Jordan Lane Price since the revival's debut episode on April 29, 2013.

== Casting ==
Following the announcement that Prospect Park would reboot All My Children as a web series, it was reported that actress Jordan Lane Price was cast in the role of an aged Miranda Montgomery. It was later confirmed that Price was cast as the new character of Celia Fitzgerald, and that the role of Miranda would be played by Denyse Tontz. Price first appeared in the contract role when the series premiered on April 29, 2013.

== Development ==
=== Introduction ===
Celia Fitzgerald first appears bumping into Pete Cortlandt (Robert Scott Wilson) on the street on April 29, 2013. Celia was a former student at Bramwell Hall before she remained there to teach art history after her high school graduation. In addition to teaching at Bramwell, Celia also volunteered at the Miranda Center. Her volunteer work including passing out condoms until her guardian, a man whose identity she did not know, forbade it. The message was passed from her guardian to her via Evelyn Johnson, the woman that oversaw the girls at Bramwell and had raised Celia since her parents' deaths years ago. Under the orders of Celia's guardian, Evelyn closely managed Celia's activities. Celia was allowed to continue her work with the Miranda Center but from an administrative support position instead. However, when she develops a crush on Pete Cortlandt (Robert Scott Wilson), Evelyn does not approve of Celia's involvement with Pete and planned to take Celia out of the country. Instead, Pete and Celia escaped to New York City.

=== Relationship with Pete Cortlandt ===
Upon her debut and pending relationship, Omar White-Nobles of TVSource Magazine referred to Pete and Celia's relationship as a high point for the series, noting "Jordan Lane Price and Rob Wilson have good, natural chemistry. I could see them turning into something big." When Pete and Celia escaped to New York City the two shared a hotel room but Celia was not comfortable sharing a bed and admitted that she was a virgin. Pete insisted that he respected Celia. They return to Pine Valley because of Pete's work causing her believe that dating a successful entrepreneur like himself was too much for her. Celia decided to end her relationship with Pete even after he professed his love for her.

Jillian Bowe confirmed that Brooke Newton's Colby would cause problems for Celia due to Pete's past crush on Colby. When Pete slept with his friend Colby Chandler after Celia ended the relationship, Celia was convinced that she had made the correct decision. Colby flaunted her sexual relationship with Pete to Celia while the women worked together on a charity gala benefiting the Miranda Center hosted by Chandler Media. Each time Pete ran into Celia, he insisted that he only cared for her and denied any involvement with Colby. Meanwhile, Colby added a bachelor auction component to the charity gala and Pete reluctantly agreed to participate.

At the auction, an unknown caller placed a bid on Celia's behalf and she won the date with Pete. Pete took her sailing and reenacted a romantic scene from her favorite movie. Their date was cut short when Pete's mother and Colby set a skunk loose and Celia was sprayed. Pete took Celia back to his place for her to clean up and they became closer.

=== Mental health issue ===
Upon running away with Pete, Celia becomes unsettled after experiencing a frightening vision in which a man threatened a young girl. It was similar to the chants that Celia often experienced in her head in which a voice whispered that "he's always right behind you."

After Pete's work forced him to return to Pine Valley, Celia researched her hallucinations. When she questioned Evelyn about the sanity of her parents, Evelyn suggested that the pressure of dating a successful and handsome entrepreneur like Pete was too much for her. That revelation convinced Celia to break up with him. The hallucinations stopped until she won a date with Pete at an auction. As the date with Pete approached, Celia's visions continued and she met with therapist Dixie Cooney. Dixie suggested that Celia's subconscious must have something to let out and she promised to help her. Celia was optimistic about her relationship with Pete after speaking with Dixie and she looked forward to her date.

== Storylines ==
Celia first appears bumping into Pete Cortlandt (Robert Scott Wilson) on the street on April 29, 2013. The two immediately form a connection, as it is revealed Celia lives at the private school, Bramwell Hall, while she tutors her fellow students. She has been raised by her mysterious guardian, although he has never revealed his identity to her. Celia and Pete begin to date, despite the disapproval of her guardian.

== Reception ==
In his review of the reboot's first episode, Errol Lewis of Soap Opera Network praised the character of Celia, and the potential romance between Celia and Pete. Lewis said, "Celia screams the modern day Erica Kane (Susan Lucci) in the sense that there’s something in her past that you can’t wait to see revealed while wanting her to get whatever she wants and if she may want her some Pete, let the girl have at it.".
