= Jordan Lane Price =

American actress, singer and model

- Born: Hamburg, PA, U.S.
- Occupations: Singer; Actress; Model
- Television: All My Children
- Musical career
- Genres: Dream pop; psychedelic rock; indie pop
- Label: Innit Recordings

Jordan Lane Price is an American actress, singer and model. She is best known for her portrayal of Celia Fitzgerald in The Online Network reboot of soap opera drama series All My Children.

== Early life ==
When Price was eight years old, she began musical theater, which eventually led her to start working in professional theater. She studied philosophy in college.

== Career ==
Price portrayed Celia Fitzgerald in The Online Network reboot of soap opera drama series All My Children. It was originally reported Price was cast in the role of an aged Miranda Montgomery; however, she would portray a new character, Celia Fitzgerald, while the role of Miranda would be played by Denyse Tontz. Price first appeared in the contract role when the series premiered on April 29, 2013. Her performance as the character was well received by critics.

Her debut extended play (EP), Sponge will be released on June 30 from Innit Recordings. It was composed entirely by singer-songwriter and producer James Levy, mixed at The Rumpus Room and mastered by Joe LaPorta at Sterling Sound. The lead single, "These Days" was positively received by critics as a "timeless piece of pop perfect" while also pointing out the "60s-inspired vibe and Price's fuzzed out vocals add to the track's winsome, retro feel". The second single, title track "Sponge", was also positively received by critics as a "tune resplendent in beats to march to and Lane Price's honeyed tones layered and lightly reverbed".

== Filmography ==
Film
Year	Title	Role	Notes
2010	Beware the Gonzo	Julie	
2010	Double Fault	Siena	Short film
2014	Gun	Jordan	Short film
2014	Ride	Marywald	
2015	The Nymphets	Allyson	
2015	4th Man Out	Jessica	
2015	Get Happy!	Sarah	
2019	The Dirt	Roxie	
2019	Dirty Sexy Saint	Samantha Jameson	

Television
Year	Title	Role	Notes
2013	All My Children	Celia Fitzgerald	April 29, 2013 – September 2, 2013
2021	Law & Order: Special Victims Unit	Lexi	Season 22, Episode 3: Remember Me in Quarantine

== Discography ==
=== Extended plays ===
- Sponge (2015)
