= Celia García Ayala =

Mexican politician

- Born: 6 January 1971 (age 55); Uruapan, Michoacán, Mexico
- Occupation: Politician
- Political party: PRD

Celia García Ayala (born 6 January 1971) is a Mexican politician from the Party of the Democratic Revolution. In 2012 she served as Deputy of the LXI Legislature of the Mexican Congress representing Michoacán.
