= Tawfik Jelassi =

Tunisian academic and government minister

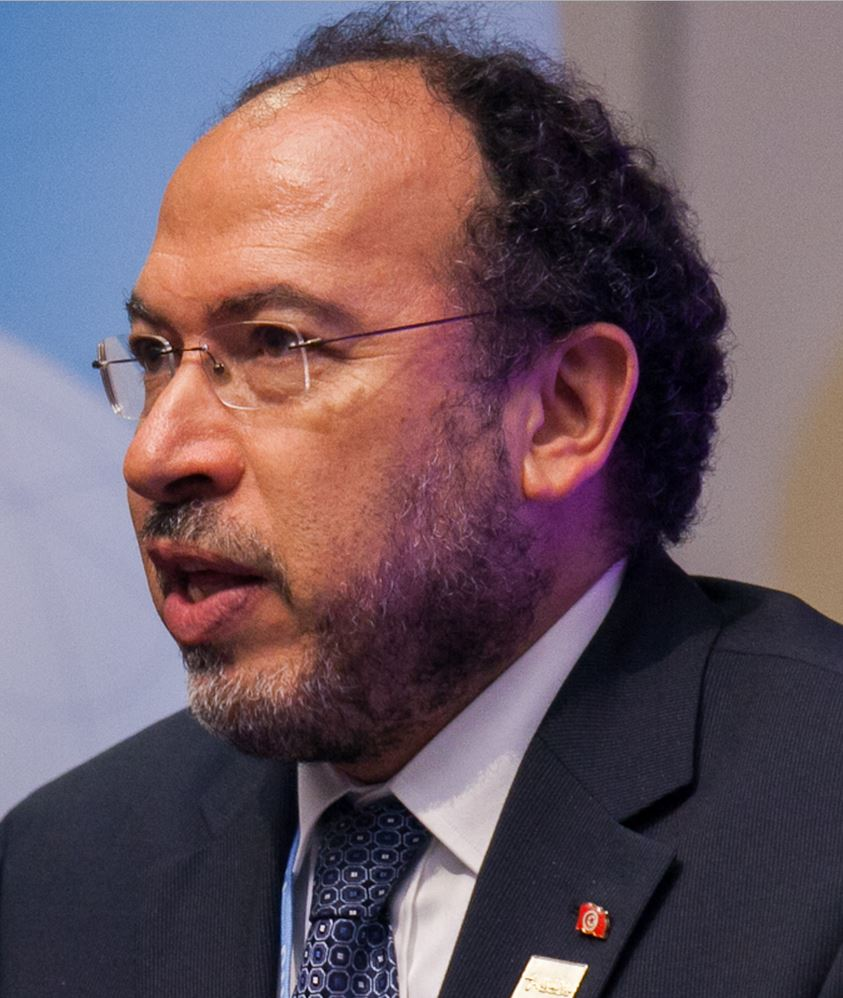
- Tawfik Jelassi in 2014

Minister of Higher Education, Scientific Research and Information and Communication Technologies
- In office 29 January 2014 – 6 February 2015
- President: Moncef Marzouki (2014); Beji Caid Essebsi (2014–2015)
- Prime Minister: Mehdi Jomaa

Personal details
- Party: Afek Tounes (2011–2012); Al Joumhouri (2012); Independent
- Occupation: Academic

Tawfik Jelassi (Arabic: توفيق الجلاصي; born 17 October 1957) is a Tunisian academic and former government minister. He was appointed Assistant Director-General for Communication and Information at UNESCO in 2021. He served as Tunisia's Minister of Higher Education, Scientific Research and Information and Communication Technologies in the Jomaa Cabinet from 2014 to 2015.

== Early life and education ==
Jelassi was born in Monastir, Tunisia. He obtained a higher diploma in computer information systems from the Higher Institute of Management of Tunis in 1978.

He continued his studies in France, earning a master's degree in applied computer science at the University of Paris-Dauphine in 1980, followed by a Diplôme d'études approfondies (DEA) in organizational computer science in 1981. He completed a PhD in information systems at New York University in 1985.

== Academic career ==
Jelassi began his academic career in the United States, where he worked as a research assistant and instructor in information systems at the Stern School of Business at New York University from 1982 to 1984. He then joined the Kelley School of Business at Indiana University as an assistant professor from 1984 to 1988.

In 1989, he moved to France to join INSEAD in Fontainebleau as a faculty member, where he later became head of the management of technology department. From 1994 to 1996, he served as professor of information technology and director of the MBA program at the Institut Théseus in Sophia Antipolis.

From 1996 to 2000, Jelassi was dean of academic affairs at the Euro-Arab Management School in Granada. In 2000, he was appointed professor of information technology and e-business and dean of MBA programs at the École des Ponts ParisTech.

In addition to his academic appointments, he has served on several international academic and institutional boards. He was a member of the board of the College of Advanced European Studies at the Sorbonne in 2004, and from 2008 to 2013 he served on the supervisory board of the Franco-Chinese Institute for Engineering and Management in Shanghai.

== Business roles ==
In February 2011, Jelassi was appointed chairman of the Tunisian telecommunications operator Tunisiana (now Ooredoo Tunisia).

In July 2013, he joined the board of the Banque Nationale Agricole.

== Government service ==
On 29 January 2014, Jelassi was appointed Minister of Higher Education, Scientific Research and Information and Communication Technologies in the Jomaa Cabinet.

He served in this role until February 2015. He succeeded Moncef Ben Salem as Minister of Higher Education and Scientific Research and Mongi Marzouk as Minister of Information and Communication Technologies, and was succeeded by Chiheb Bouden and Noomane Fehri, respectively.

== UNESCO ==
In April 2021, Jelassi became Assistant Director-General for Communication and Information at UNESCO. His sector covers digital transformation, digital innovation, knowledge societies, freedom of expression, and the role of information and communication technologies in the future of education.

== Honours ==
Jelassi has been awarded the Tunisian National Order of Merit in education and science, along with multiple international distinctions. He has been a visiting professor at the Harvard Business School (1990 and 2010) and an honorary professor at the Indian Institute of Technology Delhi (2004–2006).

== Bibliography ==
- Clémençot, Julien (19 May 2009). "Tawfik Jelassi". Jeune Afrique (in French).
