= Pieter Celie =

Dutch artist

- Born: 1942; Eindhoven, Netherlands
- Died: 2015 (aged 72–73); Borgerhout, Belgium
- Education: Design Academy Eindhoven (1967-1969), Antwerp's National Institute for the Arts
- Known for: Art

Pieter Celie (1942–2015) was a Dutch artist. Working with mixed media, he was highly influenced by pop art.

== Biography ==
Pieter Celie (born Theodor Geert van de Built) was born in Eindhoven in 1942, son of the photographer Bernardt van de Built. Celie trained at Eindhoven's Academy for Industrial Design (1967–1969) and later Antwerp's National Institute for the Arts. From the beginning of his career he mixed several media in a personal style, working as a sculptor, draftsman, painter, designer and photographer. His work was highly influenced by pop art and expressed his sense of humour, constituting a playful corpus of life-size wooden figures, colourful paintings with inserted strings, and evocative collages of photographs and drawings.

In his youth he founded the artistic group Unknown Genius (Miskende geniën). His style was polemical, and in 1969 he went on trial for the scandal created by his piece "Twenty penis". In 1976 he mistakenly spent 22 days in jail and in 1999 produced the piece "Groeten uit Sint-Gillis" (1999) evoking his stay in jail.

The artist exhibited his work in Belgium and the Netherlands, in prestigious art centers including the Fine Arts Palace in Brussels, the Museum of Fine Arts in Antwerp, the Boymans van Beuningen Museum in Rotterdam and the Krabbedans and the Museum Kempenland in Eindhoven. His creations integrated the collections of important instances like the Dutch State, the Belgian State and the Museum of West-Flanders. For many years he lived in Antwerp, Belgium, and died in the Antwerp district of Borgerhout in 2015.

== See also ==
- History of painting
- Western painting
