= Celia García-García =

Spanish pianist

Celia García-García (born in Burgos) is a Spanish pianist specialising in chamber and orchestral music, most known for her work as a celesta performer.

== Education ==
Celia García-García studied classical piano at the conservatory Burgos, followed by a bachelor's degree at Musikene in San Sebastián and at ArtEZ University of Arts in the Netherlands, and a Master of Music at Codarts Conservatory in Rotterdam.

== Work ==
García-García plays piano, celesta and synthesizer with orchestras including the Royal Concertgebouw Orchestra, Noord Nederlands Orkest, Rotterdam Philharmonic Orchestra, Dutch Ballet Orchestra and the Arnhem Philharmonic Orchestra. She also works as a ballet répétiteur at the Amsterdam University of the Arts and the National Ballet Academy of Amsterdam.

Since 2012, García-García has been the artistic programmer of the music festivals "Weekend of Romantic Music" in Rotterdam and "Romanticism" in Keukenhof.

She teaches classical piano repertory and technique at the Utrechts Conservatorium and is an accompaniment and chamber music instructor with the Fontys School of Fine and Performing Arts in Tilburg.

García-García is most known for her work as a celesta performer. In 2022, she released the first-ever recording of music for solo celesta titled Celestial Blue.

== Discography ==
- Colores del Sur. Femke IJlstra (saxophone), García-García (piano). TRPTK, 2022
- Celestial Blue. García-García (celesta). TRPTK, 2022
