= Celia Dial Saxon =

African-American schoolmistress

- Born: October 1, 1857; Columbia, South Carolina
- Died: January 29, 1935 (aged 77); Columbia, South Carolina
- Education: Normal School of South Carolina College
- Occupations: Educator, activist

Celia Dial Saxon (October 1, 1857 – January 29, 1935) was an African-American schoolmistress, who taught in Columbia, South Carolina, for 55 years. She was one of the founders of the Fairwold Industrial Home for Negro Girls and the Wilkinson Orphanage of Negro Children. In 1929, Blossom Street School was renamed in her honor. in 1954, the Columbia Housing Authority named a 400-unit, low-income housing project after her. In 2022 the University of South Carolina voted to name a residence hall in her honor.

== Biography ==
Saxon was born into slavery in Columbia, South Carolina. In 1877 she enrolled in the Normal school of the South Carolina College. Saxon taught in Columbia, South Carolina, for 55 years and in 1929 a school was renamed the Saxon School.

Saxon was active in the Woman's club movement and specifically was concerned about the welfare of women and girls. She put that concern into action by being one of the founders of the Fairwold Industrial Home for Negro Girls in Lexington County, South Carolina.

Other clubs that Saxon belonged to included; the Palmetto State Teachers' Association, the Culture Club, the Lend-a-Hand Club, the South Carolina Federation of Colored Women's Clubs, and the Woman's Christian Temperance Union.

In 1926 Saxon was awarded an Honorary Masters of Arts degree from the State Agricultural and Mechanical College at Orangeburg.

Saxon died on January 29, 1935, in Columbia, South Carolina.
