= Celia Greenwood =

Canadian biostatistician

- Born: Celia Margaret Theodora Greenwood
- Citizenship: Canadian
- Education: University of Toronto
- Known for: Research in statistical genetics
- Awards: James McGill Professorship (2019)
- Scientific career
- Fields: Biostatistics, statistical genetics
- Workplaces: McGill University

Celia Margaret Theodora Greenwood is a Canadian biostatistician specializing in statistical genetics. She is a James McGill Professor of Oncology at McGill University.

Greenwood was born in Victoria, British Columbia and attended universities in Ontario and Quebec. Greenwood earned a doctorate in biostatistics from the University of Toronto in 1998. She was affiliated with The Hospital for Sick Children and the Dalla Lana School of Public Health before joining the McGill University faculty and the Lady Davis Institute for Medical Research in 2010.

At McGill University, Greenwood became a full professor in 2017, and was named to a James McGill Professorship in 2019. She is jointly appointed to Epidemiology, Biostatistics & Occupational Health, and is also the graduate program director of the new Quantitative Life Sciences PhD program. In 2019, Greenwood and Karim Oualkacha together received over $600,000 in funding from Génome Québec for their research into precision medicine in cellular epigenomics.

Greenwood has published over 400 academic publications, which have been cited over 16,000 times, resulting in a h-index and i10-index of 61 and 156 respectively.

== Selected academic publications ==
- Donald J Sherrard, Gavril Hercz, York Pei, Norma A Maloney, Celia Greenwood, Arif Manuel, Carl Saiphoo, Stanley S Fenton, Gino V Segre. The spectrum of bone disease in end-stage renal failure—an evolving disorder. Kidney International. 1993.
- Julian Paul Midgley, Andrew Glenday Matthew, Celia Margaret T Greenwood, Alexander Gordon Logan. Effect of reduced dietary sodium on blood pressure: a meta-analysis of randomized controlled trials. JAMA. 1996.
- Brent W Zanke, Celia MT Greenwood, Jagadish Rangrej, Rafal Kustra, Albert Tenesa, Susan M Farrington, James Prendergast, Sylviane Olschwang, Theodore Chiang, Edgar Crowdy, Vincent Ferretti, Philippe Laflamme, Saravanan Sundararajan, Stéphanie Roumy, Jean-François Olivier, Frédérick Robidoux, Robert Sladek, Alexandre Montpetit, Peter Campbell, Stephane Bezieau, Anne Marie O'Shea, George Zogopoulos, Michelle Cotterchio, Polly Newcomb, John McLaughlin, Ban Younghusband, Roger Green, Jane Green, Mary EM Porteous, Harry Campbell, Helene Blanche, Mourad Sahbatou, Emmanuel Tubacher, Catherine Bonaiti-Pellié, Bruno Buecher, Elio Riboli, Sebastien Kury, Stephen J Chanock, John Potter, Gilles Thomas, Steven Gallinger, Thomas J Hudson, Malcolm G Dunlop. Genome-wide association scan identifies a colorectal cancer susceptibility locus on chromosome 8q24. Nature Genetics. 2007.
- Jean-Philippe Fortin, Aurélie Labbe, Mathieu Lemire, Brent W Zanke, Thomas J Hudson, Elana J Fertig, Celia MT Greenwood, Kasper D Hansen. Functional normalization of 450k methylation array data improves replication in large cancer studies. Genome Biology. 2014.
