= Susan Skilliter =

British academic (1930–1985)

- Born: 1930; Stepney, London, England
- Died: 16 September 1985 (aged 54)
- Education: Newnham College, Cambridge
- Occupation: Academic

Susan Skilliter (1930–1985) was a British academic, a lecturer in Turkish Studies at the University of Cambridge and a Fellow of Newnham College. She left her library to the College with a bequest which enabled the foundation of the Skilliter Centre for Ottoman Studies.

== Life ==
Susan Skilliter took a degree in Oriental Studies (Arabic and Persian) at Newnham College, Cambridge. In 1962, she was appointed to a lecturership in Turkish at the University of Manchester. She returned to Cambridge to take up a university lecturership in Turkish and a fellowship at her alma mater in 1964. She published on William Harborne and trade relations between England and the Ottomans in the Elizabethan era, and became a noted authority on the subject.

Skilliter died on 16 September 1985, at the age of 54, and left her library and a significant bequest to Newnham College.
