= Celia Duff =

British retired doctor and hyrox athlete

Personal information
- Nickname: Badass Gran
- Born: 1953 or 1954 (age 71–72)

Sport
- Country: United Kingdom
- Sport: Hyrox

Celia Duff, also known as Badass Gran, is a retired doctor and Hyrox athlete. She is a double world champion in the sport in her age category.

== Biography ==
Duff was among the first wave of women to study at the University of Cambridge and competed as a university level rower. She worked as a doctor and retired from medical practice in 2017.

=== Hyrox ===
In October 2022, Duff's daughter Alice, a Hyrox enthusiast, encouraged her to try the sport. She began competing in Hyrox at age 68. She broke the world record in the women's 65-69 category in a time that qualified her for the 2023 HYROX World Championships. She won the 65-69 World title that year. At age 70, she competed in and won the 2024 HYROX World Championships in the 70-74 age range. She shares her fitness journey online under the handle Badass Gran.
