= Celia Brooks Brown =

British writer and chef

Celia Brooks (born 1969) is a vegetarian chef, author and television host from the United States who lives in London. The "Brown" in her name was dropped after divorce in 2010.

Brooks was born in Colorado. She was pursuing a career as a director of plays when she moved to England in 1989 and went on to establish a food tour company Gastrotours in 2002. She has written nine vegetarian cookbooks and has appeared on the Saturday Kitchen and Good Food Live television shows.

== Selected publications ==
- Vegetarian Foodscape (1998)
- New vegetarian (2001)
- Entertaining Vegetarians (2003)
- New Kitchen Garden: Organic Gardening with Herbs, Vegetables and Fruit (with Adam Caplin, 2003)
- World Vegetarian Classics (2005)
- New Urban Farmer (2010)
- 5:2 Vegetarian (2014)
- Low-Carb & Gluten-Free Vegetarian (2014)
- SuperVeg: The Joy and Power of the 25 Healthiest Vegetables on the Planet (2018)
