= Celia Mara =

Brazilian singer-songwriter and producer (born 1961)

Célia Mara
- Born: July 27, 1961 (age 65)
- Origin: Brazil
- Genres: World, MPB, reggae, bossa nova
- Occupations: singer-songwriter, producer
- Instruments: voice, guitar, programming
- Years active: 1978–present
- Label: Globalista Records
- Website: Celia-mara.net

Célia Mara (born July 27, 1961) is a Brazilian singer-songwriter and producer who has lived in Vienna, Austria up until the 90s, and partly in Salvador, Bahia since 2003.

== Style ==
She defines herself as "bastardista," violating race, gender and class structures; a hybrid, mostly women made, mestizo mixed, out of rules, illegitimate, from an impure race...; or "nu Brazilian flavor", presenting a Latinized worldbeat; multicultural world music with strong Brazilian roots, singing in Portuguese, English, German, French and Spanish. Célia Mara is part of the famous movement – famous: platform for famous female culture.

Célia Mara was born in Pedra Azul, Minas Gerais, a small town in the Vale do Jequitinhonha, one of the poorest regions of the world, to this day. Politically, she grew up under a military regime. She began her musical career at 14 years old, as an autodidact on the guitar. Highly influenced by the revolutionary Tropicalismo, she started early, playing songs from Caetano veloso, Gilberto Gil, Chico Buarque, and Mercedes Sosa and her own compositions on local events. In 1979, she was the first Female composer of the Vale de Jequintinhonha to participate in a regional event, "Los procurados" festival, organized by Tadeu Martins. Later she lived in Belo Horizonte, (had shows at cabare mineiro, "Palacio das Artes") performing as well in Rio de Janeiro and São Paulo sesc Pompeia, presenting a fusion between rural and urban songs. TV appearances such as in Som Brasil de Rolando Boldrin, in Rede Globo gave a push to her career.

== Europe ==
In the early 1990s, her first European tour brought her to small clubs and minor festivals in Germany, Switzerland, Austria and Northern Italy. In 1993, she moved to Austria, having a solo and duo-career, performing at important regional jazz festivals Jazzfestival–Burghausen and Jazzfest–Jena. In 1997, she founded the Austria-based Latin-band potênciaX – with Herwig Gradischnig, Ingrid Oberkanins and others. Using of sound-programs, she was influenced by bastard pop and the art of remixing.

Célia Mara's "bastardsound" is a central-European-Brazilian mix, connected with the Spanish mestiço-movement – Manu Chao, Amparo Sanchez, Ojos de Brujo, viennese fusion Joe Zawinul and Brazilian music Tom Zé, Vanessa da Mata, Seu Jorge, Lenine, Carlinhos Brown.

Célia Mara is managed and produced since 1996 by Silvia Jura Santangelo. They run the label: globalista: no border media.

On March 8, 2011, Célia Mara got the Austrian Citizenship by honor.

== Discography ==
- Santa Rebeldia (2008; globaCD_SR08)
- Bastardista (2005; globa_CD05)
- Necessàrio – live at ORF Radiokulturhaus (2000; art libre/ORF globa_CD00)
- Hot Couture do samba (1998; art libre) globa_CD98)

== Awards ==
- 2000: Concerto Poll: best world music artist Austria
- 2003: herta pammer preis for the event: culture is our weapon
- 2006: copa da cultura, Brazilian culture export award for Bastardista
