= École des Ponts Business School =

- Motto: In business to make a better world
- Type: Grande école de commerce et de management (public research university Business school)
- Established: 1987; 39 years ago
- Founders: Célia Russo
- Parent institution: École nationale des ponts et chaussées (est.1747)
- Accreditation: AACSB; AMBA
- Academic affiliations: Conférence des grandes écoles; Institut Polytechnique de Paris
- Dean: Alon Rozen
- Academic staff: 50
- Administrative staff: 20
- Students: 400
- Location: Paris, France
- Language: English
- Website: www.pontsbschool.com

École des Ponts Business School (France)

École des Ponts Business School is the graduate business school of École nationale des ponts et chaussées (part of the Polytechnic Institute of Paris), a public university and one of the oldest and most prestigious French Grandes Écoles, founded by royal decree of King Louis XV in 1747. It was established in 1987 as the ENPC School of International Management and later renamed. The school offers MBA, Executive MBA, and doctoral programs, along with executive education courses in France and internationally.

== History ==
The school was founded in 1987 by Célia Russo to promote the study of international business and global leadership. Russo had earlier been appointed by Jacques Tanzi, Director of École nationale des ponts et chaussées, to establish the Department of Languages and International Culture. She served as the school's first dean until her death in 1999. Her awards included the Vermeil Medal of the Société d’Encouragement au Progrès (1990) and the Chevalier de l'Ordre du Mérite (1997).

Following Russo, Michel Fender served as dean (1999–2004), with Tawfik Jelassi as co-dean from 2001 and then dean from 2004 to 2013. Alon Rozen has been dean since 2014.

== Grande école system ==
École des Ponts Business School is part of the French Grande école system, which operates alongside the national public university framework. Admission to these institutions is competitive, and many graduates enter senior roles in business, government, and academia. The school is a member of the Conférence des grandes écoles and degrees are awarded by the Ministry of National Education (France).

== Rankings ==
In 2004, the school was ranked 30th among European business schools by the Financial Times. In 2010, its joint EMBA program with SIMBA was ranked 39th in the Financial Times EMBA Rankings. The same year, The Economist ranked its full-time MBA 20th among continental European programs. More recent rankings from CEO Magazine list the school's MBA and GEMBA programs in their top tiers, although these rankings are not part of major global league tables such as the Financial Times or QS World University Rankings.

== Programs ==
The school offers:

- LeadTech Global Executive MBA – a joint program with EADA Business School (Barcelona) combining online courses with in-person residencies in Europe and study trips abroad.
- Executive Doctorate in Business Administration (E-DBA) – a professional doctoral program for experienced executives, taught in English in Paris.
- Global Executive MBA (Casablanca) – a modular program delivered in Morocco focusing on leadership, strategy, and innovation.

== Deans ==
- Célia Russo (1987–1999)
- Michel Fender (1999–2004)
- Tawfik Jelassi (2004–2013)
- Alon Rozen (2014–present)

== Affiliations ==
- PONTS Alliance
- Alumni Association of École des Ponts Business School

== See also ==
- École nationale des ponts et chaussées
- Polytechnic Institute of Paris
- Association of MBAs
