= Célia Posser =

São Toméan lawyer and politician

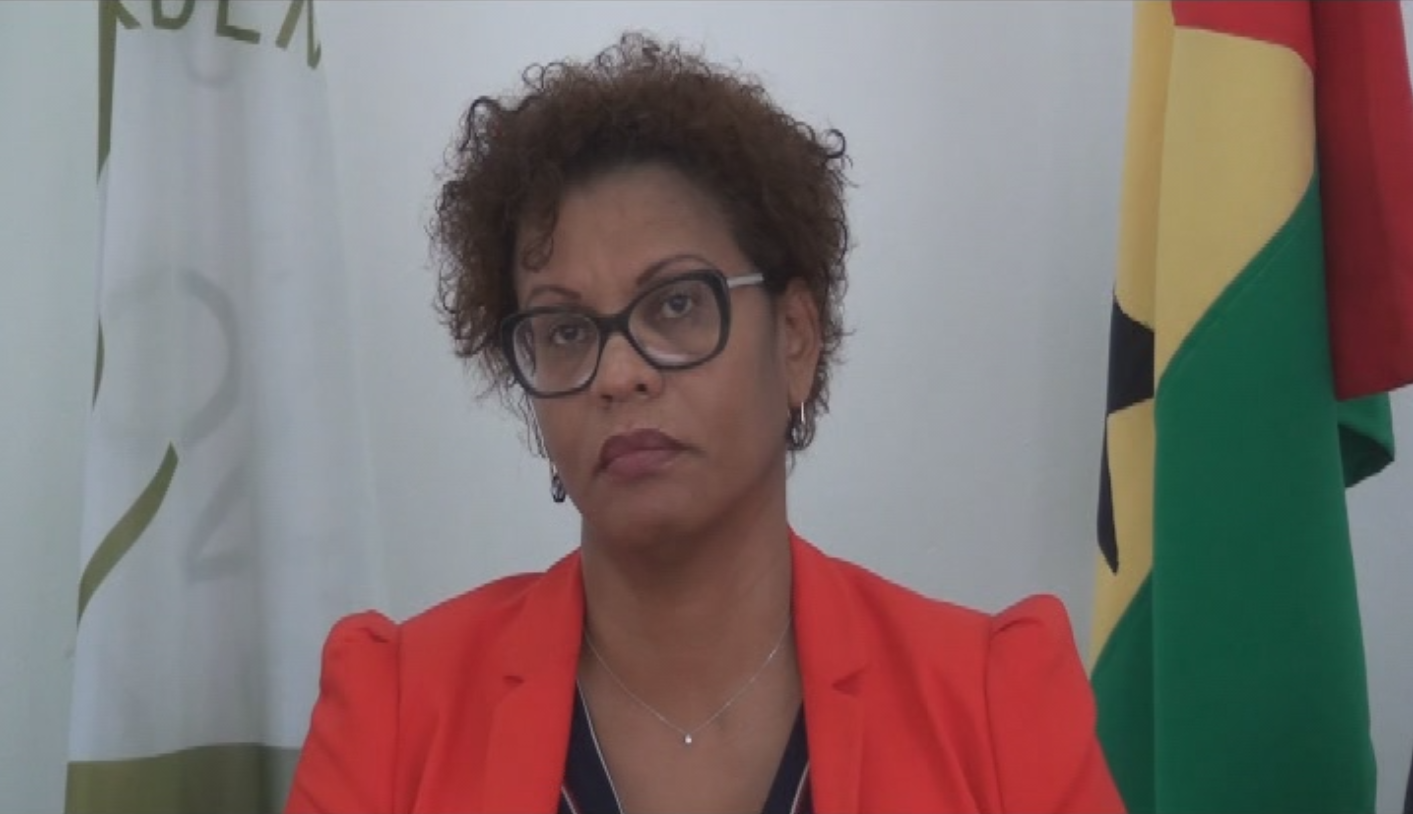

Secretary of State for Public Administration and Social Communication
- In office 2005–2006
- Prime Minister: Maria do Carmo Silveira

President of the bar association
- Incumbent
- Assumed office March 2017

Célia Posser is a São Toméan lawyer and politician. She served in the cabinet of Prime Minister Maria do Carmo Silveira between 2005 and 2006 as Secretary of State for Public Administration and Social Communication. After leaving the government she remained in the country to continue to work as a lawyer and was elected head of the national bar association in March 2017.

== Career ==
Célia Posser served as Secretary of State for Public Administration and Social Communication between 2005 and 2006 in the X Constitutional Government of São Tomé and Príncipe under Prime Minister Maria do Carmo Silveira. During her time in government she began the privatisation of the state-owned radio and television stations and also awarded the nation's first two private radio station broadcast licenses. Posser was also a representative of São Tomé and Príncipe in 2005 negotiations with Angola to improve cooperation in defence, transportation, fisheries and communications and to discuss forgiveness of $21 million of debt owed to Angola. She has also served as president of the island state's Supreme Press Council (the press regulator).

Posser has worked as a lawyer in São Tomé and Príncipe since 2007. She has also been president of the Human Rights and Gender Platform, a private human rights organisation based in the country. Posser is a member of the Association of Women Lawyers.

Posser was elected president of the São Tomé and Príncipe bar association in March 2017 for a four-year term. She is the second woman to hold the position. Posser promised to ensure that the country's lawyers would promote justice and uphold human rights. She was elected at a difficult time for the judicial system, when court proceedings were on hold owing to strikes by court officials and public prosecutors.

In her role as bar association president Posser has warned of the dangers of a top-down restructure of the court system by President Evaristo Carvalho. She also announced, on 18 October, that lawyers in the country would be ceasing pro bono work they had long been undertaking for the poorest citizens of São Tomé and Príncipe. They had previously worked for free and paid the expenses of the court staff from bar association funds. The arrangement was withdrawn in the hope that the government would introduce a proper legal aid system to allow access to justice for all.
