= Celia B. Fisher =

American psychologist

Celia B. Fisher is an American psychologist. She is the Marie Ward Doty professor of ethics at Fordham University in New York City, and director of its Center for Ethics Education. Fisher is also the director of the HIV and Drug Abuse Prevention Research Ethics Training Institute (RETI). Fisher is the founding editor of the journal Applied Developmental Science and serves on the IOM Committee on Clinical Research Involving Children Dr. Fisher has over 300 publications and 8 edited volumes on children’s health research and services among diverse racial/ethnic, sexual and gender minority groups in the U.S. and internationally. She has been funded by NIAAA, NIAID, NICHD, NIDA, NIMHD, and NSF. Fisher is well-known for her federally funded research programs focusing on ethical issues and well-being of vulnerable populations including ethnic minority youth and families, LGBTQ+ youth, persons with HIV and substance use disorders, college students at risk for drinking problems, and adults with impaired consent capacity. Fisher chaired the American Psychological Association’s (APA's) Ethics Code Task Force that created and handled the 2002 revision of the APA Ethical Principles of Psychologists and Code of Conduct, which continues to be the foundation of the current code, even after later amendments addressing human rights in 2010 and 2017. Recent publications include research on health equity for BIPOC, LGBTQ+ and economically marginalized children, youth and young adults in areas including social determinants of sexual health, substance use, social media and offline discrimination, mental health and COVID-related distress and racial bias among Asian, Indigenous, Hispanic, Black and White adolescents and adults, and parental COVID-19 pediatric vaccine hesitancy across diverse populations. Fisher's research on COVID-19 vaccine hesitancy found that only 31% of parents were willing to vaccinate young children, with many expressing concerns about vaccine effectiveness, necessity, and the side effects.

== Education ==
Fisher received her Bachelor of Science degree in Human Development from Cornell University in 1970. In 1975 she received a Master's in Experimental Psychology from The New School for Social Research.

== Publications ==
Fisher wrote Decoding the Ethics Code: A Practical Guide for Psychologists, and has co-edited other books including The Handbook of Ethical Research with Ethnocultural Populations and Communities, Research with High-Risk Populations: Balancing Science, Ethics, and Law, and Encyclopedia of Applied Developmental Science.

== Awards ==
- Lifetime achievement award of the Health Improvement Institute for human research protection, 2010
- Fellow of the American Association for the Advancement of Science, 2012
- American Psychological Association Award for outstanding contributions to ethics education, 2017
