= Råshult =

Settlement in Älmhult, Sweden

Råshult Södregård
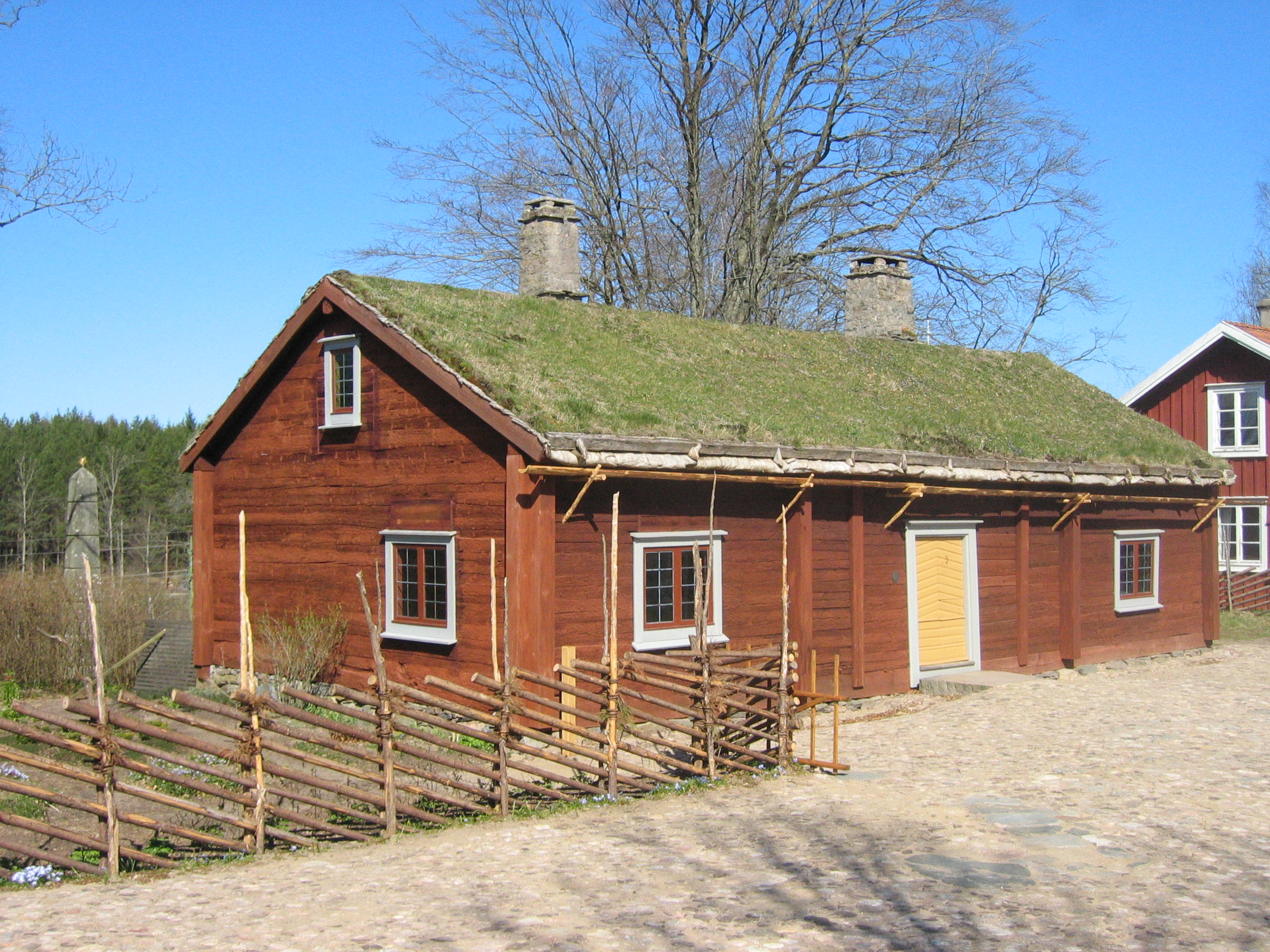
- Interactive map of Råshult Södregård
- Location within Kronoberg Location within Sweden
- Coordinates: 56.618°N 14.202°E
- Country: Sweden
- Province: Småland
- County: Kronoberg County
- Municipality: Älmhult Municipality

Area
  - Land: 17 ha (42 acres)

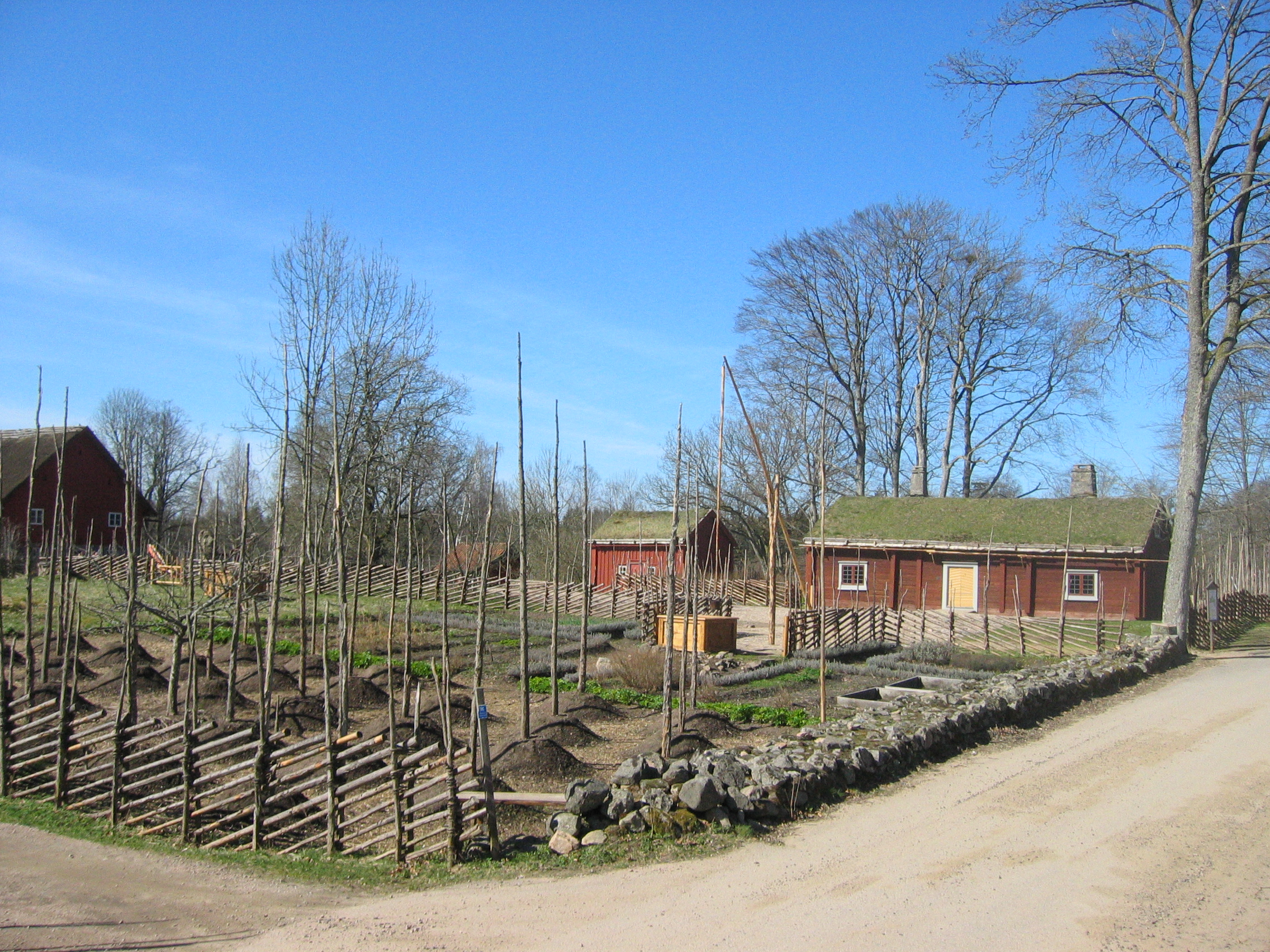
Birthplace of Carl Linnaeus

Råshult is a village just north of Älmhult in Kronoberg County, Småland, Sweden. It is notable as the birthplace of the seminal biologist and "father of modern taxonomy", Carl Linnaeus (1707–1778). In Råshult there is also a memorial to him.

== Public art ==
In 2009, Älmhult Municipality purchased artworks by Sven-Ingvar Johansson to adorn the entrance and the road leading up to the reception building. These pieces are intended to spark curiosity and creativity, and to inspire a desire to discover the small "things" found in nature.

Carl Linnaeus's brother, Samuel Linnaeus, was a prominent beekeeper and the first person to write a book about beekeeping and the "excellence" of bees. Through the artwork—featuring a beehive (or log hive) and a number of bees—the artist aims to highlight Samuel Linnaeus's interest in beekeeping and to link the two brothers' shared interest in animals and nature. Visitors encounter animals such as woodpeckers, ants, weevils, the peregrine falcon, bats, ravens, and blue butterflies.

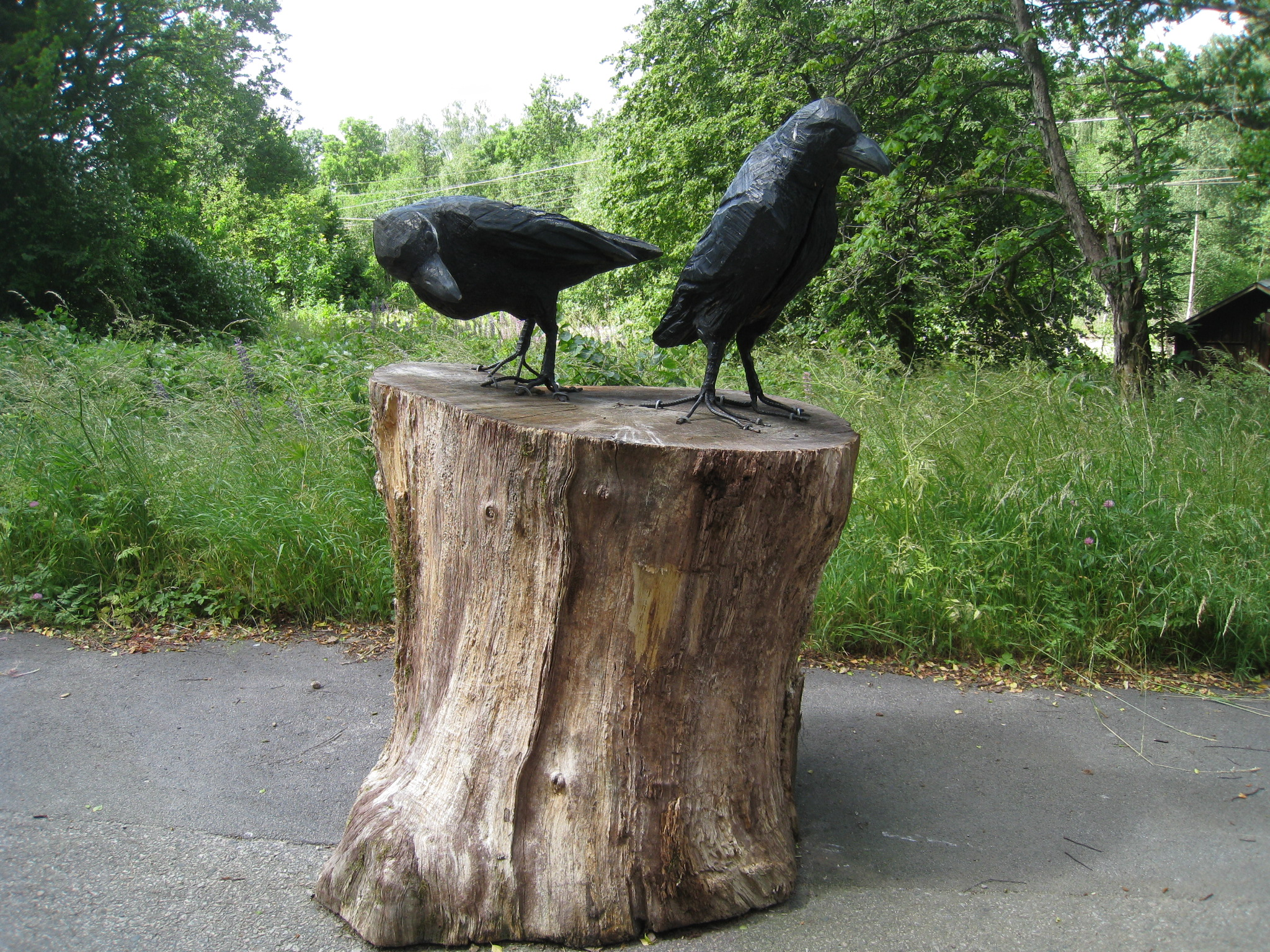
The ravens, by Sven-Ingvar Johansson.

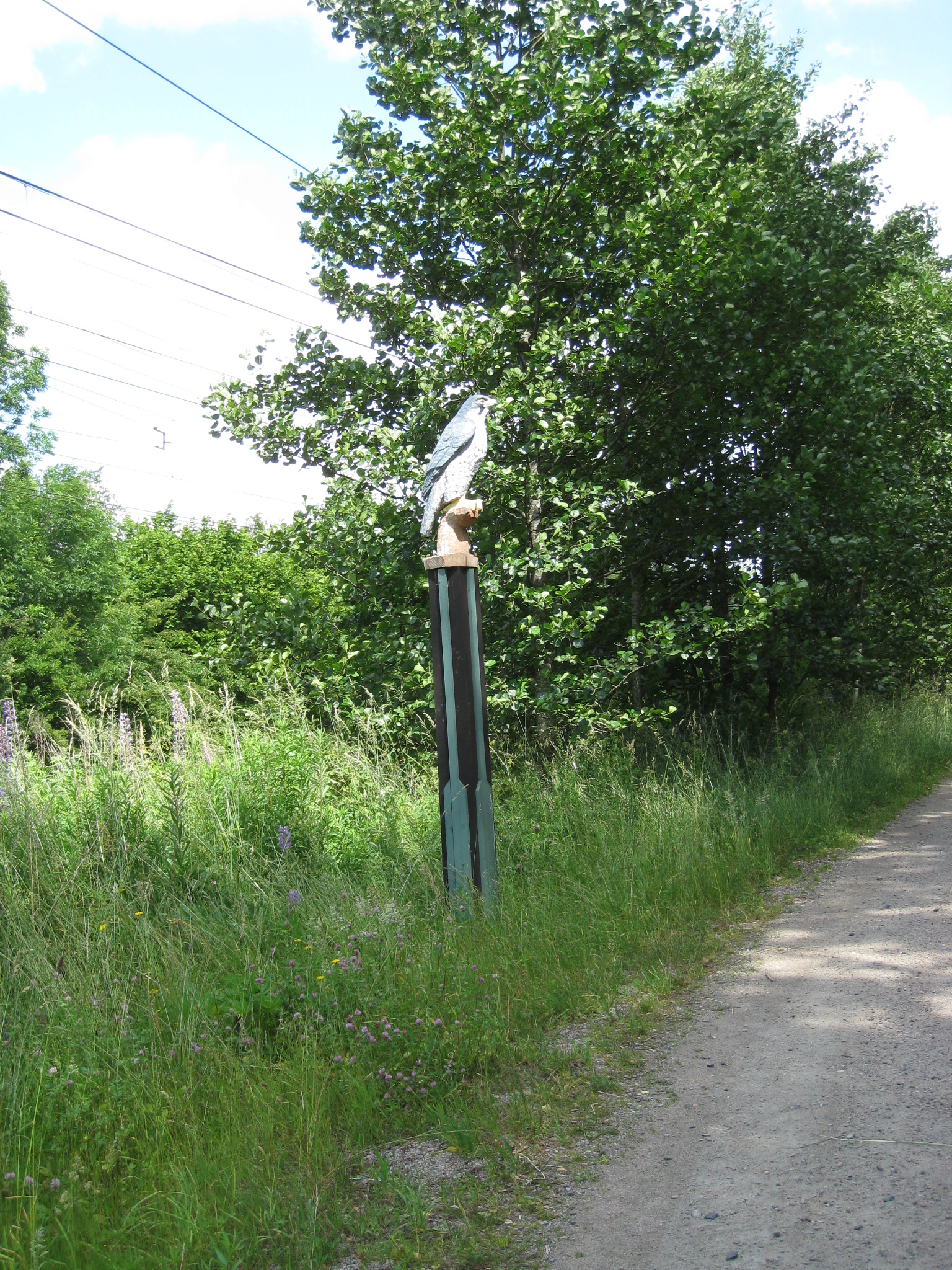
The peregrine falcon, by Sven-Ingvar Johansson.
