= Jacobus Bontius =

Dutch physician

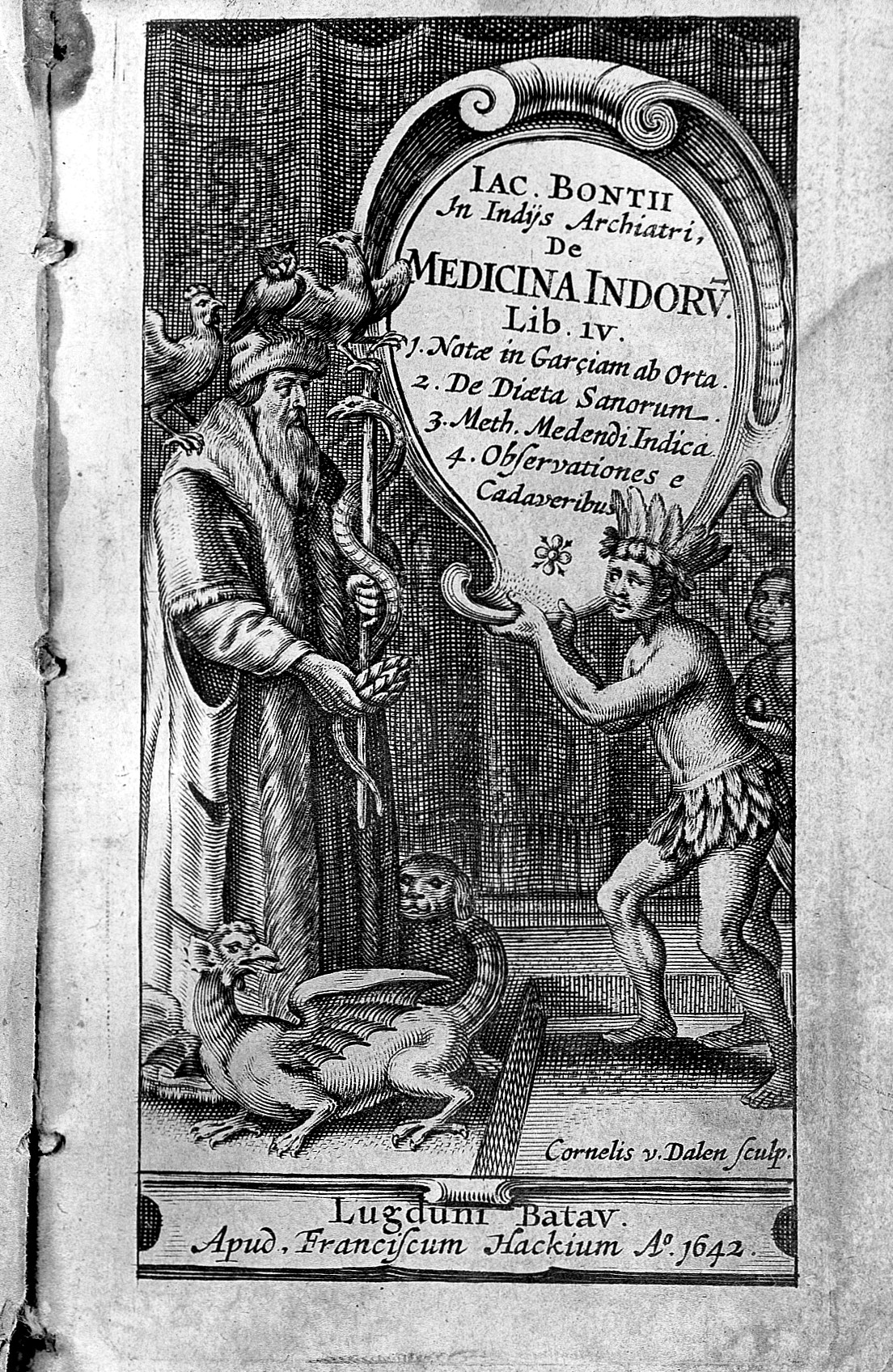
Jacobus Bontius

Jacobus Bontius (Jacob de Bondt) (1592, in Leiden – 30 November 1631, in Batavia, Dutch East Indies) was a Dutch physician and a pioneer of tropical medicine. He is known for the four-volume work De medicina Indorum. His 1631 work "Historiae naturalis et medicae Indiae orientalis" introduced the Malay and Indonesian word "Orang Hutan" (literally "Forest Person") into Western and Southern European languages.

== Life ==
Bontius was born in Leiden, the youngest child of eight of the physician Gerard de Bondt / Gerardus Bontius (1536–1599), professor at Leiden University. Amongst his brothers were Reinier de Bondt / Regnerus Bontius (1576–1623), court physician to Maurice of Nassau, and Willem de Bondt / Wilhelmus Bontius, law professor at Leiden University.

Jacobus graduated M.D. from Leiden in 1614. He sailed to the East Indies with Jan Pieterszoon Coen, for the Dutch East India Company.

== De medicina Indorum (1642) ==
Bontius' medical observations were published after his death. They include what is recognized as the first medical description of beriberi. He reported on the dysentery epidemic in Java in 1628. The second edition of 1658, put together by Willem Piso, was expanded and included material by Piso on the Americas.
