= Carl Linnaeus bibliography =

Works by Swedish botanist Carl Linnaeus

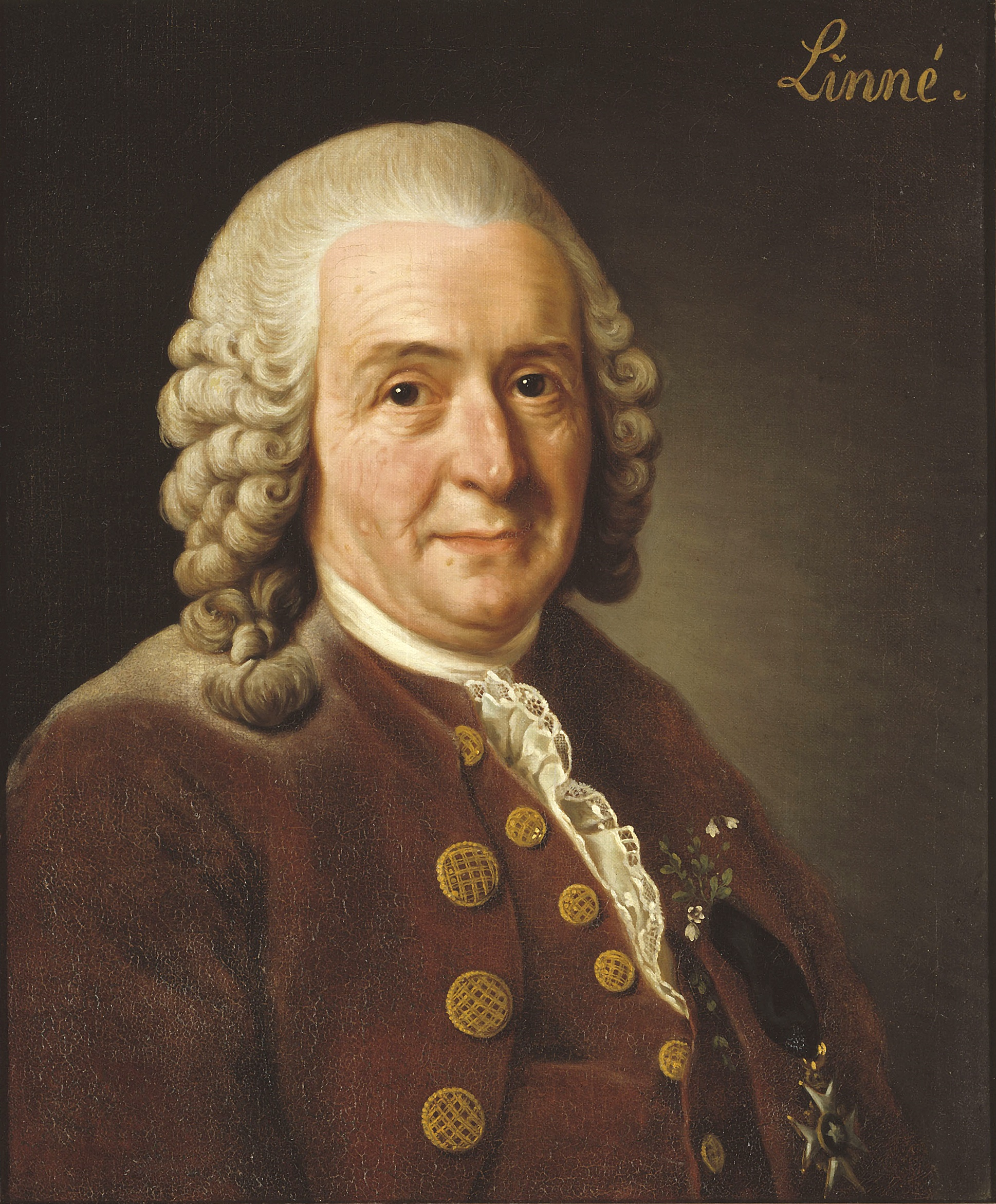
Carl Linnaeus

The bibliography of Carl Linnaeus includes academic works about botany, zoology, nomenclature and taxonomy written by the Swedish botanist Carl Linnaeus (1707–1778). Linnaeus laid the foundations for the modern scheme of binomial nomenclature and is known as the father of modern taxonomy. His most famous works are Systema Naturae which is considered as the starting point for zoological nomenclature together with Species Plantarum which is internationally accepted as the beginning of modern botanical nomenclature.

== Published works ==
- (1735) Systema Naturae
- (1736) Fundamenta Botanica
- (1736) Bibliotheca Botanica
- (1736) Musa Cliffortiana
- (1737) Critica Botanica
- (1737) Flora Lapponica
- (1737) Genera Plantarum
- (1737) Hortus Cliffortianus
- (1738) Classes plantarum
- (1740) Orbis eruditi judicium de Caroli Linnaei MD scriptis
- (1745) Öländska och Gothländska Resa
- (1745) Flora Svecica
- (1746) Fauna Svecica
- (1747) Flora Zeylanica
- (1747) Wästgötha Resa
- (1748) Hortus Uppsaliensis
- (1749) Materia Medica
- (1751) Philosophia Botanica
- (1751) Skånska Resa
- (1752) Odores Medicamentorum
- (1753) Species Plantarum
- (1753) Museum Tessinanum
- (1754, 1759) Flora Anglica
- (1754) Museum S:ae R:ae M:tis Adolphi Friderici
- (1762) Inebriantia
- (1763) Centuria Insectorum
- (1764) Museum S:ae R:ae M:tis Ludovicae Ulricae Reginae
- (1766) Clavis Medicinae Duplex
- (1767) Mantissa Plantarum
- (1771) Mantissa Plantarum Altera
- (1773) Deliciae Naturae (Note: Lecture given in Latin in 1772, translated into Swedish 1773)
- (1774) Systema Vegetabilium (Note: Edited by JA Murray as the "13th edition" of the Systema Naturae: Caroli a Linné &c Systema Vegetabilium à Jo. Andr. Murray, M.D, &c Gottingae et Gothae 1774. 8vo pp 844. (Linné 1774))

== Posthumous publications ==
Paul Dietrich Giseke was a student and friend of Linnaeus, who kept notes on Linnaeus' lectures and published them after Linnaeus' death as Praelectiones in ordines naturales plantarum (1792).

- (1792) Praelectiones in ordines naturales plantarum published by Benj. Gottl. Hoffmanni.
- (1907) Föreläsningar öfver stenriket published by C. Benedicks
- (1907) Lachesis naturalis published by A.O. Lindfors
- (1957) Örtabok published by T. Fredbärj
- (1957) Diaeta naturalis 1733 published by A. Hj. Uggla

== Edited works ==
Amoenitates Academicae 10 vols. 1787–1790

== Bibliography ==
- Stöver, Dietrich Johann Heinrich (1794). Joseph Trapp (ed.). The life of Sir Charles Linnæus. London: Library of Congress. ISBN 0-19-850122-6.
- Pulteney, Richard; Maton, WG (1805). A General View of the Writings of Linnaeus (2 ed.). London: Mawman.
- Blunt, Wilfrid (2004). Linnaeus: the compleat naturalist. London: Frances Lincoln Limited. ISBN 0-7112-2362-9.

=== Works by Linnaeus ===
- Linné, Carl von (1774). Murray, Johann Andreas (ed.). Systema vegetabilium (13th edition of Systema Naturae) (2 vols.). Göttingen: Typis et impensis Jo. Christ. Dieterich.
  - Linné, Carl von (1785) [1774]. Systema vegetabilium (13th edition of Systema Naturae) [A System of Vegetables 2 vols.]. Lichfield: Lichfield Botanical Society.
- Linnaeus, Carl; Grufberg, Isaac Olofsson (1754). Flora Anglica, quam cum consens. experient. fac. medicae in Regia Academia Upsaliensi, sub praesidio viri nobilissimi atque experientissimi, Dn. Doct. Caroli Linnaei...publicae ventilationi offert Isaacus Olai Grufberg, Stockholmiensis. In Auditorio Carolino Majori D. (in Latin). Uppsala: Laur. Magnus Hojer. (also in Google Books)
- Linnaeus, Carl (1792). Giseke, Paul Dietrich (ed.). Praelectiones in ordines naturales plantarum. Hamburg: Benj. Gottl. Hoffmanni.
