= Classes Plantarum =

Book by Carl Linnaeus

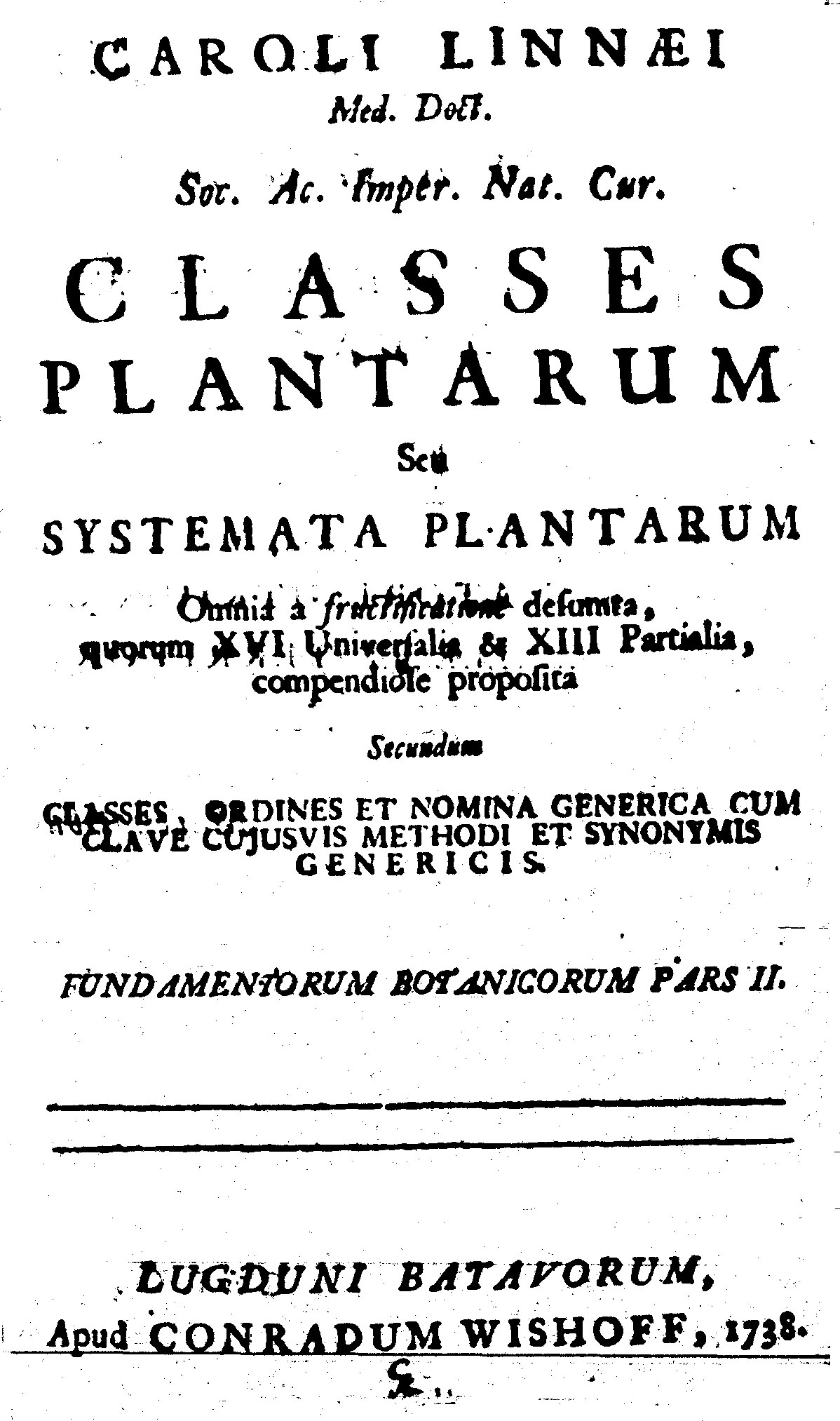
Title page of Linnaeus's Classes Plantarum of 1838

Classes Plantarum ('Classes of plants', Leiden, Oct. 1738) is a book that was written by Carl Linnaeus, a Swedish botanist, physician, zoologist and naturalist.

The Latin-language book is an elaboration of aphorisms 53–77 of his Fundamenta Botanica and a complementary volume to his Species Plantarum, Genera Plantarum, Critica Botanica, and Philosophia Botanica.

== Bibliographic details ==
Full bibliographic details including exact dates of publication, pagination, editions, facsimiles, brief outline of contents, location of copies, secondary sources, translations, reprints, manuscripts, travelogues, and commentaries are given in Stafleu and Cowan's Taxonomic Literature.

== See also ==
- Systema Naturae

== Bibliography ==
- Stafleu, Frans A. & Cowan, Richard S. 1981. "Taxonomic Literature. A Selective Guide to Botanical Publications with dates, Commentaries and Types. Vol III: Lh–O." Regnum Vegetabile 105.
- Linnaeus, Carl 1738. Classes Plantarum. Leiden: Conrad Wishoff. Disponible at Gallica.
