= Critica Botanica =

Book by Carl Linnaeus

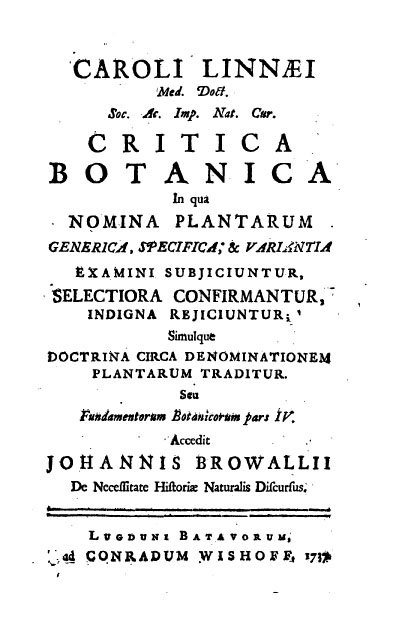
Title page of Carl Linnaeus's Critica Botanica of 1737

Critica Botanica ("Critique of botany", Leiden, July 1737) was written by Swedish botanist, physician, zoologist and naturalist Carl Linnaeus (1707–1778). The book was published in Germany when Linnaeus was 29 with a discursus by the botanist Johannes Browallius (1707–1755), bishop of Åbo (Turku). The first edition was published in July 1737 under the full title Critica botanica in qua nomina plantarum generica, specifica & variantia examini subjiciuntur, selectoria confirmantur, indigna rejiciuntur; simulque doctrina circa denominationem plantarum traditur. Seu Fundamentorum botanicorum pars IV Accedit Johannis Browallii De necessitate historiae naturalis discursus.

Linnaeus's principles of botanical nomenclature were first expounded in Fundamenta Botanica ("Foundations of botany") of 1736, in chapters VII to X which contained the aphorisms (principles) 210 to 324 that outlined the rules for the acceptance and formation of names. These were later elaborated, with numerous examples, in his Critica Botanica of 1737. The practical application of these rules was soon seen in subsequent publications such as Flora Lapponica ("Flora of Lapland", 1737), Hortus Cliffortianus ("In honour of Clifford's garden", 1738), and Flora Svecica ("Flora of Sweden", 1746). Together the Fundamenta and Critica summarised Linnaeus's thoughts on plant nomenclature and classification which he later revised and elaborated in his Philosophia Botanica of 1751.

In the Critica, Linnaeus presented a series of rules which guided him in his own publications, established standards of procedure for his followers, and led him to discard on a grand scale the names used by his predecessors. Many of his canons have long since been disregarded, but they ensured that modern botanical nomenclature at least began with a series of well-formed, euphonious and convenient names.

== Binomial nomenclature ==
To understand the objectives of the Critica it is first necessary to appreciate the state of botanical nomenclature at the time of Linnaeus. In accordance with the provisions of the present-day International Code of Botanical Nomenclature the starting point for the scientific names of plants effectively dates back to the list of species enumerated in Linnaeus's Species Plantarum, ed. 1, published 1 May 1753. The Species Plantarum was, for European scientists, a comprehensive global Flora for its day, and by the 10th edition had reached over 3000 species. Linnaeus had learned plant names as short descriptive phrases (polynomials) known as nomina specifica. Each time a new species was described the diagnostic phrase-names had to be adjusted, and lists of names, especially those including synonyms (alternative names for the same plant) became extremely unwieldy. Linnaeus's solution was to associate with the generic name an additional single word, what he termed the nomen triviale, to designate a species. Linnaeus emphasized that this was simply a matter of convenience, it was not to replace the diagnostic nomen specificum. But over time the nomen triviale became the "real" name and the nomen specificum became the Latin "diagnosis" that must, according to the rules of the International Code of Botanical Nomenclature, accompany the description of all new plant species: it was that part of the plant description distinguishing that particular species from all others. Linnaeus did not invent the binomial system but he was the person who provided the theoretical framework that lead to its universal acceptance.

The second word of the binomial, the nomen triviale as Linnaeus called it, is now known as the specific epithet and the two words, the generic name and specific epithet together make up the species name.

== Historical context of Linnaean publications ==
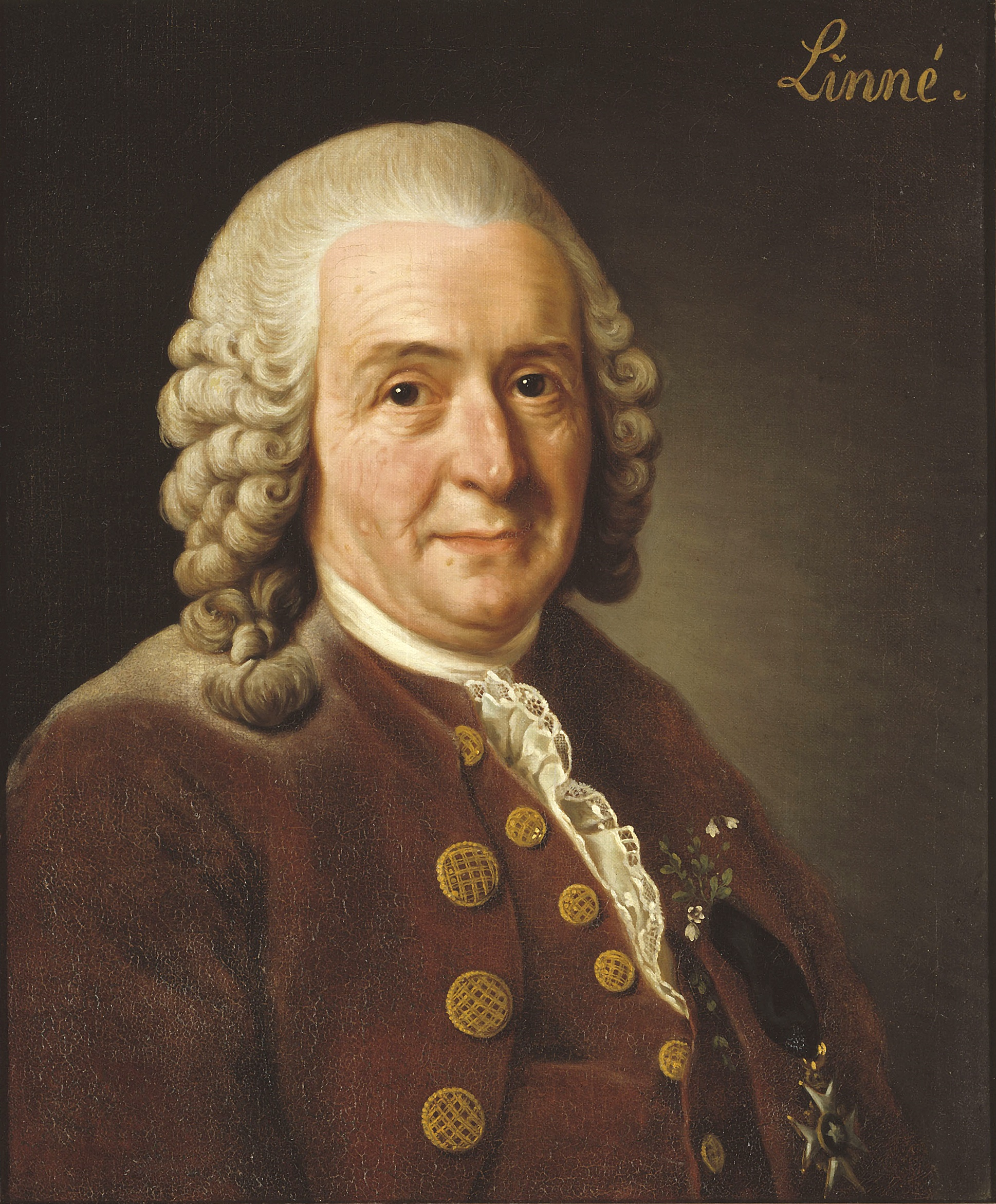
Carl Linnaeus (1707–1778), who established the binomial system of plant nomenclature

Systema Naturæ was Linnaeus's early attempt to organise nature. The first edition was published in 1735 and in it he outlines his ideas for the hierarchical classification of the natural world (the "system of nature") by dividing it into the animal kingdom (Regnum animale), the plant kingdom (Regnum vegetabile) and the "mineral kingdom" (Regnum lapideum) each of which he further divided into classes, orders, genera and species, with [generic] characters, [specific] differences, synonyms, and places of occurrence. The tenth edition of this book in 1758 has been adopted as the starting point for zoological nomenclature. The first edition of 1735 was just eleven pages long, but this expanded with further editions until the final thirteenth edition of 1767 had reached over 3000 pages.

In the early eighteenth century colonial expansion and exploration created a demand for the description of thousands of new organisms. This highlighted difficulties in communication about plants, the replication of descriptions, and the importance of an agreed way of presenting, publishing and applying plant names. From about 1730 when Linnaeus was in his early twenties and still in Uppsala, Sweden, he planned a listing of all the genera and species of plants known to western science in his day. Before this could be achieved, he needed to establish the principles of classification and nomenclature on which these works were to be based.

We can never hope for a lasting peace and better times till Botanists come to an agreement among themselves about the fixed laws in accordance with which judgment can be pronounced on names.

=== The Dutch period ===
From 1735 to 1738 Linnaeus worked in the Netherlands where he was personal physician to George Clifford (1685–1760) a wealthy Anglo-Dutch merchant–banker with the Dutch East India Company who had an impressive garden containing four large glasshouses that were filled with tropical and sub-tropical plants collected overseas. Linnaeus was enthralled by these collections and prepared a detailed systematic catalogue of the plants in the garden, which he published in 1738 as Hortus Cliffortianus. It was during this exceptionally productive period of his life that he published the works that were to lay the foundations for biological nomenclature. These were Fundamenta Botanica (1736) ("Foundations of botany"), Bibliotheca Botanica ("Botanical bibliography", 1736), and Critica Botanica (1737) He soon put his theoretical ideas into practice in his Genera Plantarum ("Genera of plants", 1737), Flora Lapponica (1737), Classes Plantarum ("Plant classes", 1738), and Hortus Cliffortianus (1738). The ideas he explored in these works were revised until, in 1751, his mature thinking was finally published as Philosophia Botanica ("Science of botany") released simultaneously in Stockholm and Amsterdam.

=== Species plantarum ===
With the foundations of plant nomenclature and classification now in place Linnaeus then set about the monumental task of describing all the plants known in his day and, with the publication of Species Plantarum in 1753, his ambitions of the 1730s were finally accomplished. Species Plantarum was his most acclaimed work and a summary of all his botanical knowledge. Here was a global Flora that codified the usage of morphological terminology and acted as a bibliography of all the pre-Linnaean botanical literature of scientific importance. It presented his new 'sexual system' of plant classification and became the starting point for scientific botanical nomenclature for 6000 of the 10,000 species he estimated made up the world's flora. Here too, for the first time, the species, rather than the genus, becomes the fundamental taxonomic unit. Linnaeus defined species as "... all structures in nature that do not owe their shape to the conditions of the growth place and other occasional features." There was also the innovation of the now familiar nomen triviale (pl. nomina trivialia) of the binary name although Linnaeus still regarded the real names as the differentiae specificae or "phrase names" which embodied the diagnosis for the species – although be was eventually to regard the trivial name (specific epithet) as one of his great inventions. Sketches of the book are known from 1733 and the final effort resulted in his temporary collapse.

=== Fundamenta, Critica and Philosophia ===
The Fundamenta Botanica ("The Foundations of Botany") of 1736 consisted of 365 aphorisms (principles) with principles 210–324 devoted to nomenclature. He followed this form of presentation in his other work on nomenclature. Linnaeus apparently regarded these as a "grammar and a syntax" for the study of botany. Chapters VII to X comprised principles 210 to 324 to do with the nomenclature of genera, species and varieties and how to treat synonyms. The Critica Botanica was an extension of these nomenclatural chapters of the Fundamenta. Critica Botanica which was published a year later in July 1737, the principles of the Fundamenta are repeated essentially unchanged but with extensive additions in smaller print. It was this work, with its dogmatic, often amusing and provocative statements, that was to spread his ideas and enthrall intellects of the stature of Goethe. He was, however, dismissive of botanical work other than taxonomy and presented his principles as dogma rather than reasoned argument.

These works established ground rules in a field which, at this time, had only "gentlemen's agreements". Conventions such as: no two genera should have the same name; no universally agreed mechanisms. Genera Plantarum ran to five editions, the first in 1737 containing short descriptions of the 935 plant genera known at that time. Observing his own principle to keep generic names as short, euphonious, distinctive and memorable as possible he rejected many names that had gone before, including those of his fellow botanists which was not popular. In their place he used names that commemorated patrons, friends and fellow botanists as well as many names taken from Greek and Roman mythology.

== Table of contents ==
1.1 Contents

1.1.1 Generic names (Nomina Generica)
1.1.2 Species names (Nomina Specifica)
1.1.3 Variety names (Nomina Variantia)
1.1.4 Synonyms – (Nomina Synonyma)

1.2 Names in honour of persons
1.3 Editions
1.4 Reviews

== English translation of some principles ==
By far the most important section of the Critica is that dealing with generic names – here we clearly see the forces shaping the present-day provisions of the Botanical Code. In the Philosophia Botanica § 159 Linnaeus had stated that a genus of plants was a group of species possessing similarly constructed organs of fructification, i.e. flowers and fruits, and hence distinguishable by these from other genera. Some examples of the aphorisms (principles) concerned with genera are given below:

§ 213 All those plants which belong to one genus must be designated by the same generic name.

Quaecunque plantae genere conveniunt, eodem nomine generico designandae sunt.

§ 214 All those plants which belong to different genera must be designated by different generic names.

Quaecunque, e contrario, plantae genere differunt, diverso nomine generico designandae sunt.

§ 217 If one and the same generic name has been adopted to designate two different genera, it will have to be banished from one of the positions which it occupies.

Nominum genericum unum idemque, ad diversa designandum genera assumtum, altero loco excludendum erit.

§ 228 Generic names with a similar sound lead to confusion.

Nominum Genericorum terminatio & Sonus, quantity fieri possit, facilitanda sunt.

§ 238 The pronunciation of the name should be made as easy as possible.

Nomina Generica Sesquipedalia, enunciatu difficilia, vel nausepsa, fugienda sunt.

§ 247 Greek generic names are to be written in Latin characters.

Nomina Generica Greaca Latinis literis pingenda sunt.

Linnaeus considered that generic names should be apt in meaning, pleasant to hear, easy to say, and not more than 12 letters long. He advocates the use of commemorative personal names as botanical names, quoting his own name as an example:

it is commonly believed that the name of a plant which is derived from that of a botanist shows no connection between the two ... [but] ... Linnaea was named by the celebrated Gronovius and is a plant of Lapland, lowly, insignificant, disregarded, flowering but for a brief space—after Linnaeus who resembles it.

And in relation to specific names:

§ 225 A plant is completely named when it is furnished with a generic and specific name.
§ 256 The specific name should distinguish the plant from all others of the same genus.
§ 258 The specific name will identify the plant which bears it at the first glance, since it expresses the differentia which is imprinted on the plant itself.

== Historical assessment ==
Linnaeus's system of classification follows the principles of Aristotelian logic, by which arranging subjects into classes is classification; distinguishing divisions of classes is logical division. The group to be divided is the genus; the parts into which it is divided are the species. The terms genus and species acquired their specialized biological usage from Linnaeus's predecessors, in particular Ray and Tournefort. There was also the question of whether plants should a) be put together or separated because they conform to a definition (essentialism) or b) put together with plants having similar characteristics generally, regardless of the definition (empiricism). Linnaeus was inclined to take the first approach using the Method of Logical Division (Note: Another example of Aristotelian logic is the Law of Excluded Middle (everything is either A or not A) used as the basis for dichotomous keys used in plant identification.) based on definition, what he called in Philosophia Botanica §152 the dispositio theoretica – but in practice he employed both methods.

Botanical historian Alan Morton, though praising Linnaeus's contribution to classification and nomenclature, is less complimentary about the theoretical ideas expressed in the publications discussed above:

Linnaeus was the master of the botany of his time, and his influence on the development of botanical science powerful and lasting ... his work demonstrated the success of his improved methods of description, diagnosis and nomenclature, and made detailed systematic observation the guide and criterion in taxonomy. ... In his theoretical ideas, on the contrary, Linnaeus was a man of the past who never escaped from the restricting circle of idealist-essentialist thought in which his early high school training had confined him. This was the background to the contradictory statements in the Philosophia, to his narrow view of botany, his blindness to the advances in plant physiology and anatomy, [and] his unquestioning acceptance of special creation.

Linnaean historian, chronicler, and analyst Frans Stafleu points out that Linnaeus's training and background was scholastic. He excelled in logic, "... which was almost certainly the Aristotelian and Thomistic logic generally taught in secondary schools all over Europe":

Linnaeus's methods were based on philosophical principles and logical a priori assumptions which gradually lost their relevance to the natural sciences during the eighteenth century. Even so, the direct results of his work were salutary: descriptions were standardised, ranks fixed, names given according to precise rules and a classification proposed which permitted rapid and efficient storage and retrieval of taxonomic information. No wonder that much of what Linnaeus proposed stood the test of time. The designation of species by binary names which have the character of code designations is only one element out of many which show the profound practicality underlying Linnaeus's activities and publications.

Linnaeus's philosophical approach to classification is also noted by botanist David Frodin who observed that applying the methodus naturalis to books and people as well as plants, animals and minerals, was a mark of Linnaeus's 'scholastic' view of the world:

Most subsequent [to Linnaeus's Bibliotheca Botanica] classifications of botanical literature, including geographical entities, would be more or less empirically based highlighting a recurrent conflict between essentialism, empiricism, nominalism and other doctrines in the theory and practice of any kind of classification.

Finally, Linnaean scholar William T. Stearn has summarised Linnaeus's contribution to biology as follows:

By the introduction of his binomial system of nomenclature Linnaeus gave plants and animals an essentially Latin nomenclature like vernacular nomenclature in style but linked to published, and hence relatively stable and verifiable, scientific concepts and thus suitable for international use. This was his most important contribution to biology.

== Bibliographic details ==
Full bibliographic details including exact dates of publication, pagination, editions, facsimiles, brief outline of contents, location of copies, secondary sources, translations, reprints, travelogues, and commentaries are given in Stafleu and Cowan's Taxonomic Literature.

== Bibliography ==
- Ekedahl, Nils (2005). "Collecting Flowers. Linnaean Method and the Humanist Art of Reading". Symbolae Botanicae Upsaliensis. 33 (3): 9–19.
- Frodin, David 2002. Guide to Standard Floras of the World, 2nd ed. Cambridge University Press: Cambridge.
- Hort, Arthur 1938. The "Critica Botanica" of Linnaeus. London : Ray Society. (English translation rev. M.L. Green, with Introduction by Sir Arthur Hill)
- Jonsell, Bengt (2005). "Linnaeus at his Zenith – the Rise to the Species Plantarum and its Aftermath". Symbolae Botanicae Upsaliensis. 33 (3): 9–19.
- Jørgensen, Per M. (2005). "Linnaeus at Work with 'Species Plantarum". Symbolae Botanicae Upsaliensis. 33 (3): 81–89.
- Morton, Alan G. (1981). History of Botanical Science: An Account of the Development of Botany from Ancient Times to the Present Day. London: Academic Press. ISBN 0-12-508382-3.
- Sprague, T.A. (1953). "Linnaeus as a Nomenclaturist". Taxon. 2 (3): 40–46. Bibcode:1953Taxon...2...40S. doi:10.2307/1217339. JSTOR 1217339.
- Stafleu, Frans A. 1971. Linnaeus and the Linnaeans: the Spreading of their Ideas in Systematic Botany, 1735–1789. Utrecht: International Association for Plant Taxonomy. ISBN 90-6046-064-2.
- Stafleu, Frans A. & Cowan, Richard S. 1981. Taxonomic Literature. A Selective Guide to Botanical Publications with dates, Commentaries and Types. Vol III: Lh–O. Regnum Vegetabile 105.
- Stearn, William T. 1960. "Notes on Linnaeus’s ‘Genera Plantarum’". In Carl Linnaeus, Genera plantarum fifth edition 1754. Facsimile reprint Weinheim. Historiae Naturalis Classica 3.
- Stearn, William T. 1971. In Blunt, William. The Compleat Naturalist: a Life of Linnaeus. New York: Frances Lincoln. ISBN 0-7112-1841-2.
- Stearn, William T. 1983. Botanical Latin. London: David & Charles. ISBN 0-7153-8548-8.
- Stearn, William T. 1986. Linnaeus and his students. In "The Oxford Companion to Gardens". Jellicoe, Geoffrey et al. (eds). Oxford: Oxford University Press. ISBN 0-19-866123-1.
