= Goodenia rostrivalvis =

Scientific classification
- Kingdom: Plantae
- Clade: Tracheophytes
- Clade: Angiosperms
- Clade: Eudicots
- Clade: Asterids
- Order: Asterales
- Family: Goodeniaceae
- Genus: Goodenia
- Species: G. rostrivalvis

Binomial name
- Goodenia rostrivalvis Domin

Species of plant

Goodenia rostrivalvis is a species of flowering plant in the family Goodeniaceae and is endemic to a restricted area of New South Wales. It is an ascending subshrub with egg-shaped to lance-shaped leaves with the narrower end towards the base, and thyrses or racemes of hairy yellow flowers.

== Description ==
Goodenia rostrivalvis is an ascending subshrub that typically grows to a height of up to about 60 cm (24 in) is glabrous. The leaves on the stems are egg-shaped to lance-shaped with the narrower end towards the base, 35–70 mm (1.4–2.8 in) long and 8–20 mm (0.31–0.79 in) wide with toothed edges. The flowers are arranged in thyrses or racemes with linear bracts 5–20 mm (0.20–0.79 in) long and similar bracteoles, each flower on a pedicel 5–30 mm (0.20–1.18 in) long. The sepals are linear to lance-shaped, 5–6 mm (0.20–0.24 in) long, the corolla yellow, 14–18 mm (0.55–0.71 in) long. The lower lobes of the coroalla are 7–8 mm (0.28–0.31 in) long, the wings about 2.5 mm (0.098 in) wide.

== Taxonomy and naming ==
Goodenia rostrivalvis was first formally described in 1929 by Karel Domin in the Bibliotheca Botanica from specimens collected near Katoomba in 1910.

== Distribution and habitat ==
This goodenia is only known from the Blue Mountains where it grows on south-facing sandstone cliffs near Wentworth Falls .
