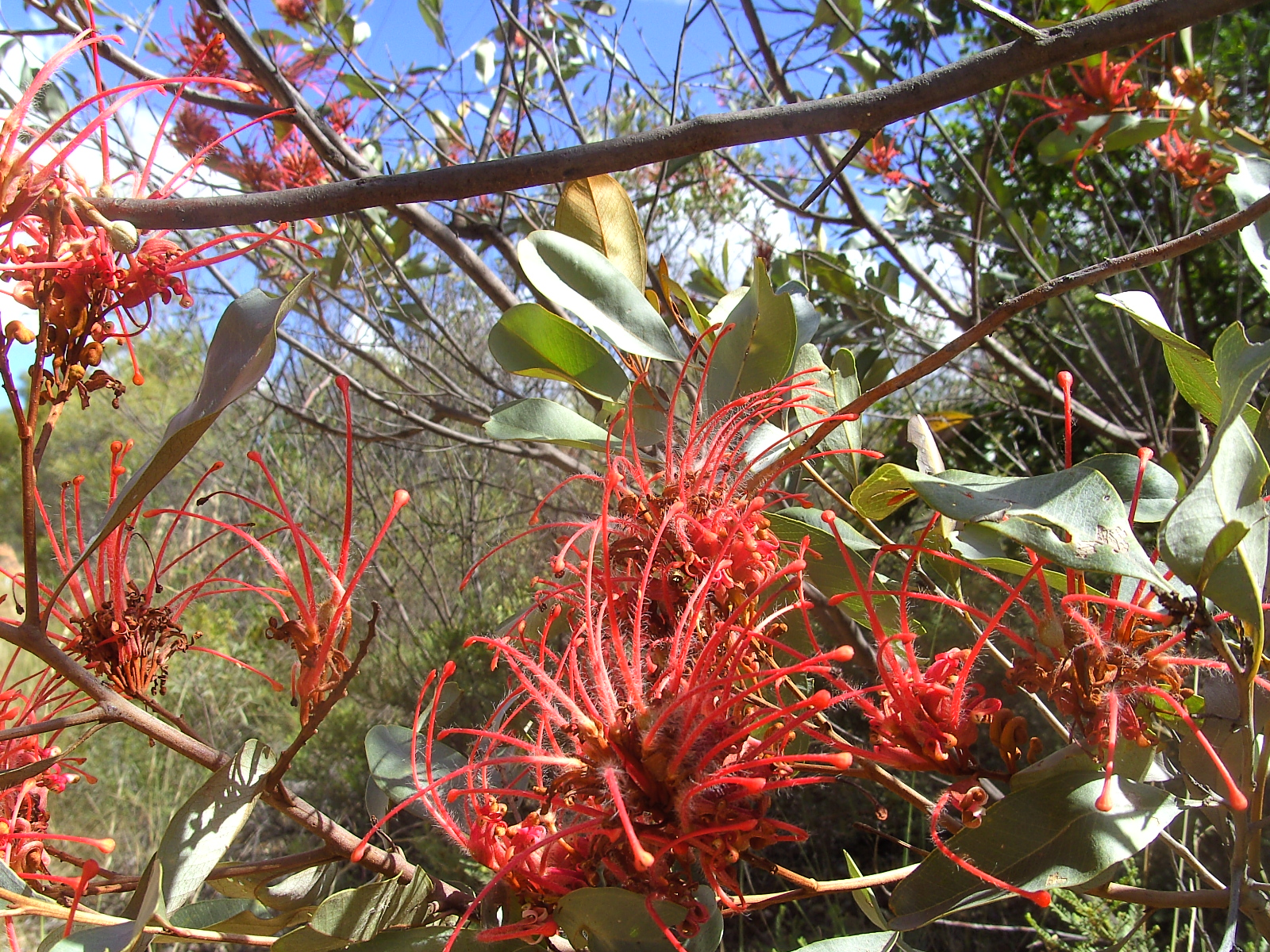

Conservation status
- Least Concern (IUCN 3.1)

Scientific classification
- Kingdom: Plantae
- Clade: Embryophytes
- Clade: Tracheophytes
- Clade: Spermatophytes
- Clade: Angiosperms
- Clade: Eudicots
- Order: Proteales
- Family: Proteaceae
- Genus: Grevillea
- Species: G. decora

Binomial name
- Grevillea decora Domin

Subspecies
- Grevillea decora Domin subsp. decora; Grevillea decora subsp. telfordii Domin

= Grevillea decora =

Species of shrub native to Queensland, Australia

Grevillea decora is a species of flowering plant in the family Proteaceae and is endemic to Queensland. It is an erect shrub or small tree with a single main stem, oblong, oval or egg-shaped leaves, and groups of pinkish red or pink flowers.

== Description ==
Grevillea decora is an erect shrub or small tree that typically grows to a height of 1–6 m (3 ft 3 in – 19 ft 8 in) and has a single main stem. Its leaves are oblong, oval or egg-shaped, 30–180 mm (1.2–7.1 in) long and 15–40 mm (0.59–1.57 in) wide, the lower surface densely silky-hairy. The flowers are arranged near the ends of the branchlets on a one-sided rachis 15–66 mm (0.59–2.60 in) long, the pistil 35–55 mm (1.4–2.2 in) long. Flowering time varies with subspecies and the fruit is a follicle 8–15 mm (0.31–0.59 in) long.

== Taxonomy ==
Grevillea decora was first formally described in 1921 by Karel Domin in the journal Bibliotheca Botanica from specimens he collected near Pentland in 1910. The specific epithet (decora) means "beautiful".

In 2000, Robert Owen Makinson described two subspecies in the Flora of Australia and the names are accepted by the Australian Plant Census:

- Grevillea decora Domin subsp. decora has branchlets covered with mostly rusty-brown hairs, leaves 100–180 mm (3.9–7.1 in) long, rusty-brown flower buds, a pistil 50–55 mm (2.0–2.2 in) long and flowers from January to September;
- Grevillea decora subsp. telfordii Domin has branchlets covered with mostly silvery-grey hairs, leaves 50–80 mm (2.0–3.1 in) long, pinkish flower buds, a pistil 35–40 mm (1.4–1.6 in) long and flowers mainly from March to June.

== Distribution and habitat ==
Subspecies decora grows in woodland shrubland in shallow soil over sandstone and occurs in patchy locations along the ranges of inland eastern Queensland from near Wandoan to near Pentland but subspecies telfordii grows in heath and forest near Laura in far north Queensland.

== Conservation status ==
G. decora is listed as least concern on the IUCN Red List of Threatened Species. Both subspecies of are listed as of least concern under the Queensland Government Nature Conservation Act 1992.

== See also ==
- List of Grevillea species
