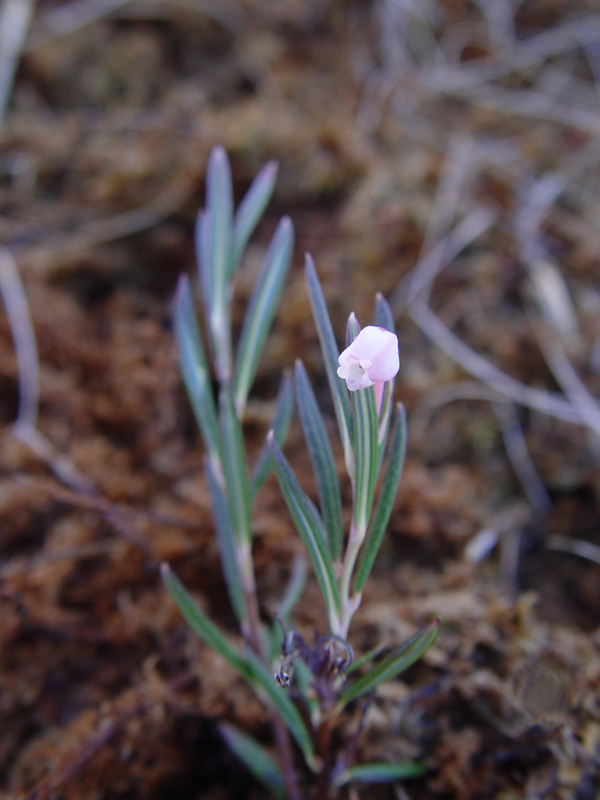
- Andromeda polifolia var. polifolia in flower

Conservation status
- Least Concern (IUCN 3.1)

Scientific classification
- Kingdom: Plantae
- Clade: Tracheophytes
- Clade: Angiosperms
- Clade: Eudicots
- Clade: Asterids
- Order: Ericales
- Family: Ericaceae
- Subfamily: Vaccinioideae
- Tribe: Andromedeae
- Genus: Andromeda; L.
- Species: A. polifolia

Binomial name
- Andromeda polifolia L.

= Andromeda polifolia =

Species of flowering plant

Andromeda polifolia, common name bog-rosemary, is a species of flowering plant in the heath family Ericaceae, native to northern parts of the Northern Hemisphere. It is the only member of the genus Andromeda, and is only found in bogs in cold peat-accumulating areas. Andromeda glaucophylla is a synonym of A. polifolia var. latifolia.

== Description ==
It is a small shrub growing to 10–20 cm (4–8 in) (rarely to 40 cm or 16 in) tall with slender stems. The leaves are evergreen, alternately arranged, lanceolate, 1–5 cm (1/2–2 in) long and 2–8 mm (0.08–0.31 in) broad, dark green above (purplish in winter) and white beneath with the leaf margins curled under. The flowers are bell-shaped, white to pink, 5–8 mm (0.20–0.31 in) long; flowering is in late spring to early summer. The fruit is a small capsule containing numerous seeds.

There are two varieties, treated as distinct species by some botanists:

- Andromeda polifolia var. polifolia. Northern Europe and Asia, northwestern North America.
- Andromeda polifolia var. latifolia Aiton [1789]. Northeastern North America (syn. A. glaucophylla Link [1821], A. polifolia var. glaucophylla (Link) DC. [1839]).

== Etymology ==
The genus was named by Carl Linnaeus who observed it during his 1732 expedition to Lapland and compared the plant to Andromeda from Greek mythology. The specific epithet is a noun in apposition, which Linnaeus based on Johann Christian Buxbaum's pre-Linnaean generic designation Polifolia. Buxbaum in turn derived the name from Johann Bauhin, who used it to mean "having polium-like leaves". The precise plant that Bauhin meant by polium is uncertain, but it may have been Teucrium montanum. The common name "bog rosemary" derives from the superficial resemblance of the leaves to those of rosemary, which is not closely related.

== Fossil record ==
Many fossil seeds of †Andromeda carpatica have been extracted from borehole samples of the Middle Miocene fresh water deposits in Nowy Sacz Basin, West Carpathians, Poland.

== Cultivation ==
Numerous cultivars have been developed for garden use, all of which require damp acid soil in shade. The cultivars 'Compacta' and 'Macrophylla' have gained the Royal Horticultural Society's Award of Garden Merit. Like most other members of the family Ericaceae, they are acid-loving plants (calcifuges), and must be grown in a medium with a low pH.

== Chemistry ==
Bog rosemary contains grayanotoxin, which when ingested may cause respiratory problems, dizziness, vomiting, or diarrhoea.

== Fungal associations ==
Research in West Siberian bogs has revealed that Andromeda polifolia harbors a diverse fungal community. While many of these fungi are also found on other bog plants, some appear to be specific to A. polifolia. This fungal community plays a role in the decomposition of the plant's leaf litter and contributes to the overall carbon cycling in the bog ecosystem. The composition of this community is influenced by environmental factors, particularly water level.

== Images ==
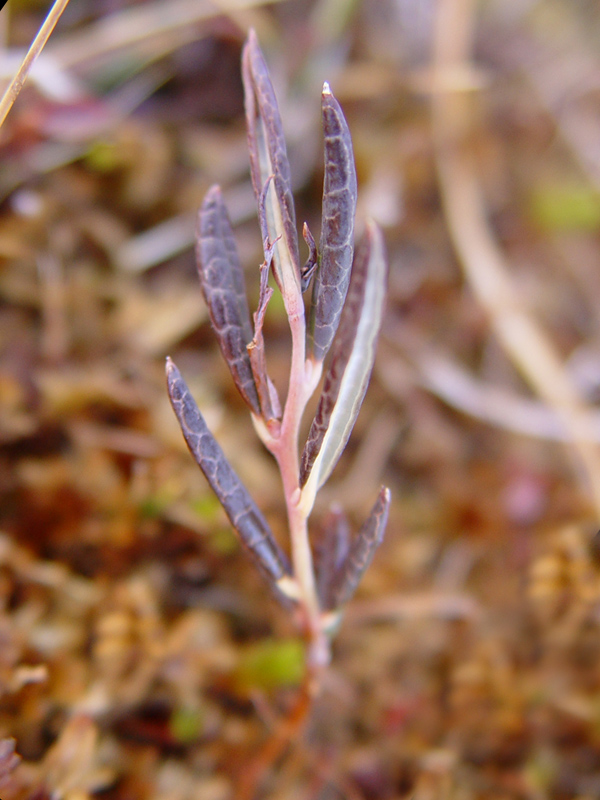
Andromeda polifolia var. polifolia leaves

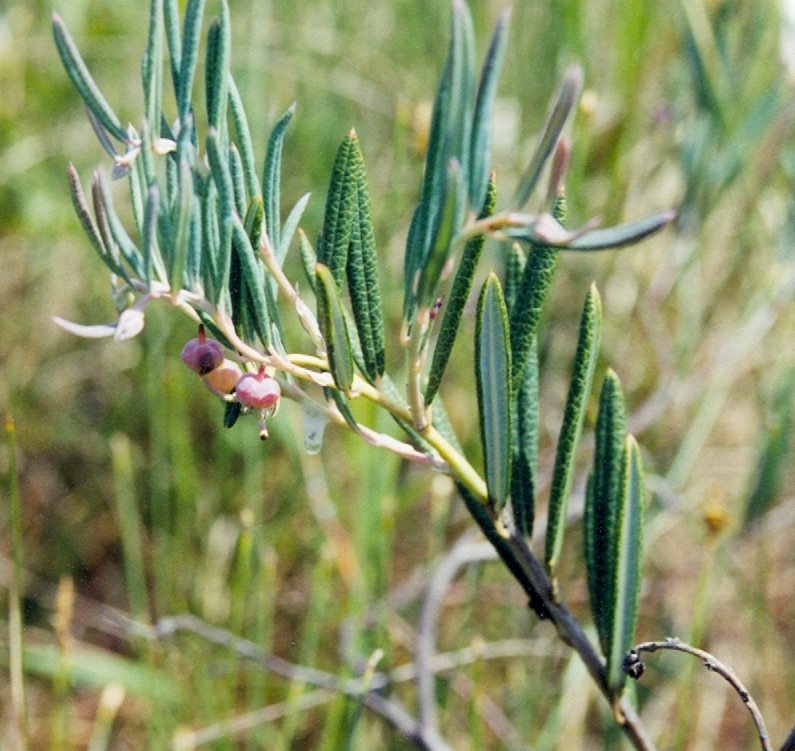
A. polifolia, Pancake Bay, Ontario

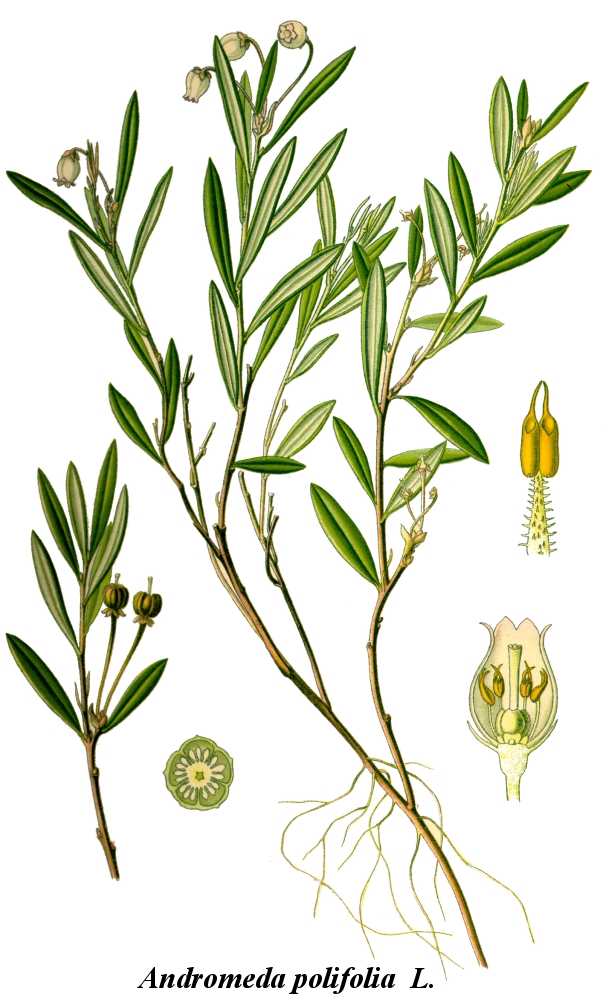
1885 illustration

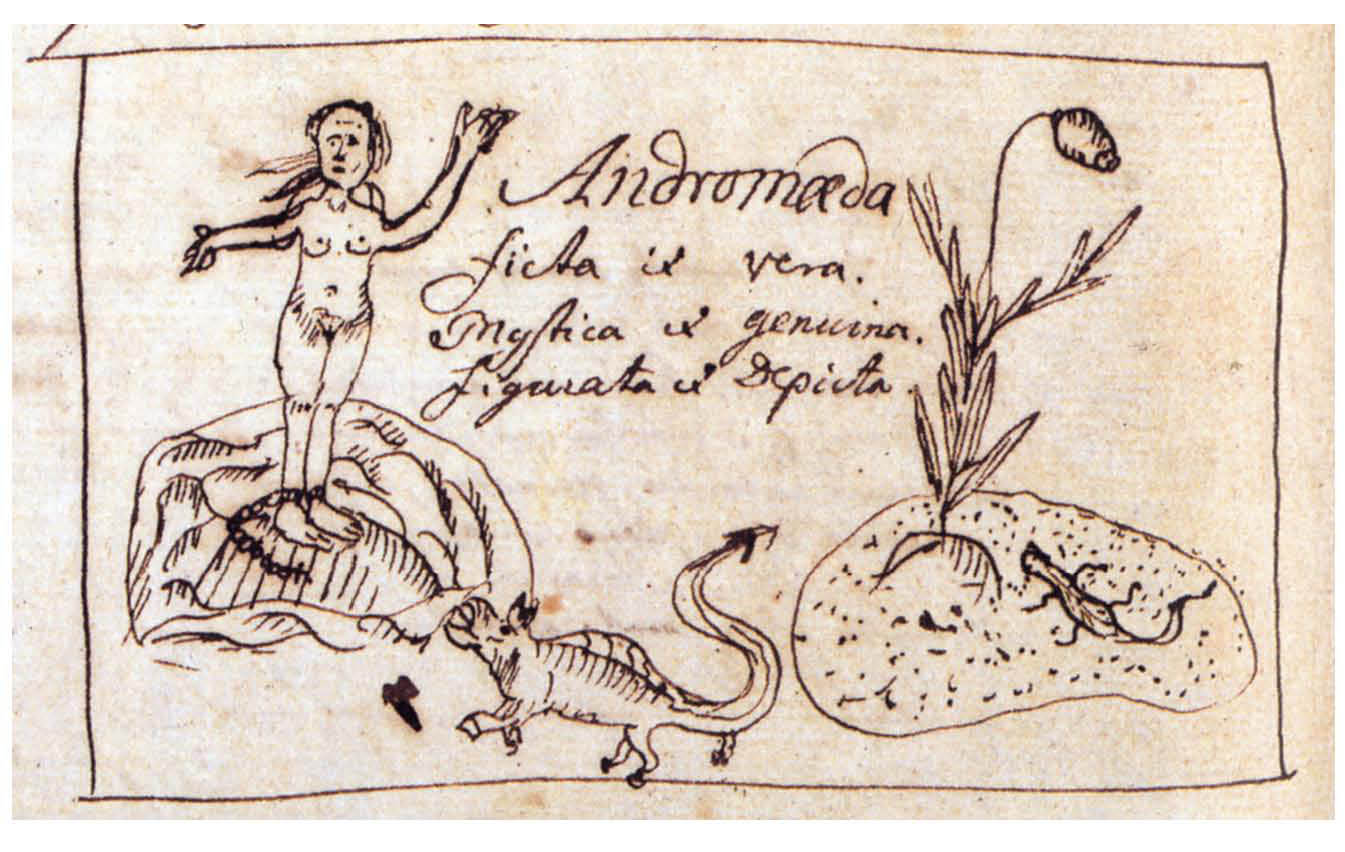
Linnaeus' original drawing
