= Linnaeus' expedition to Lapland =

18th-century Arctic expedition

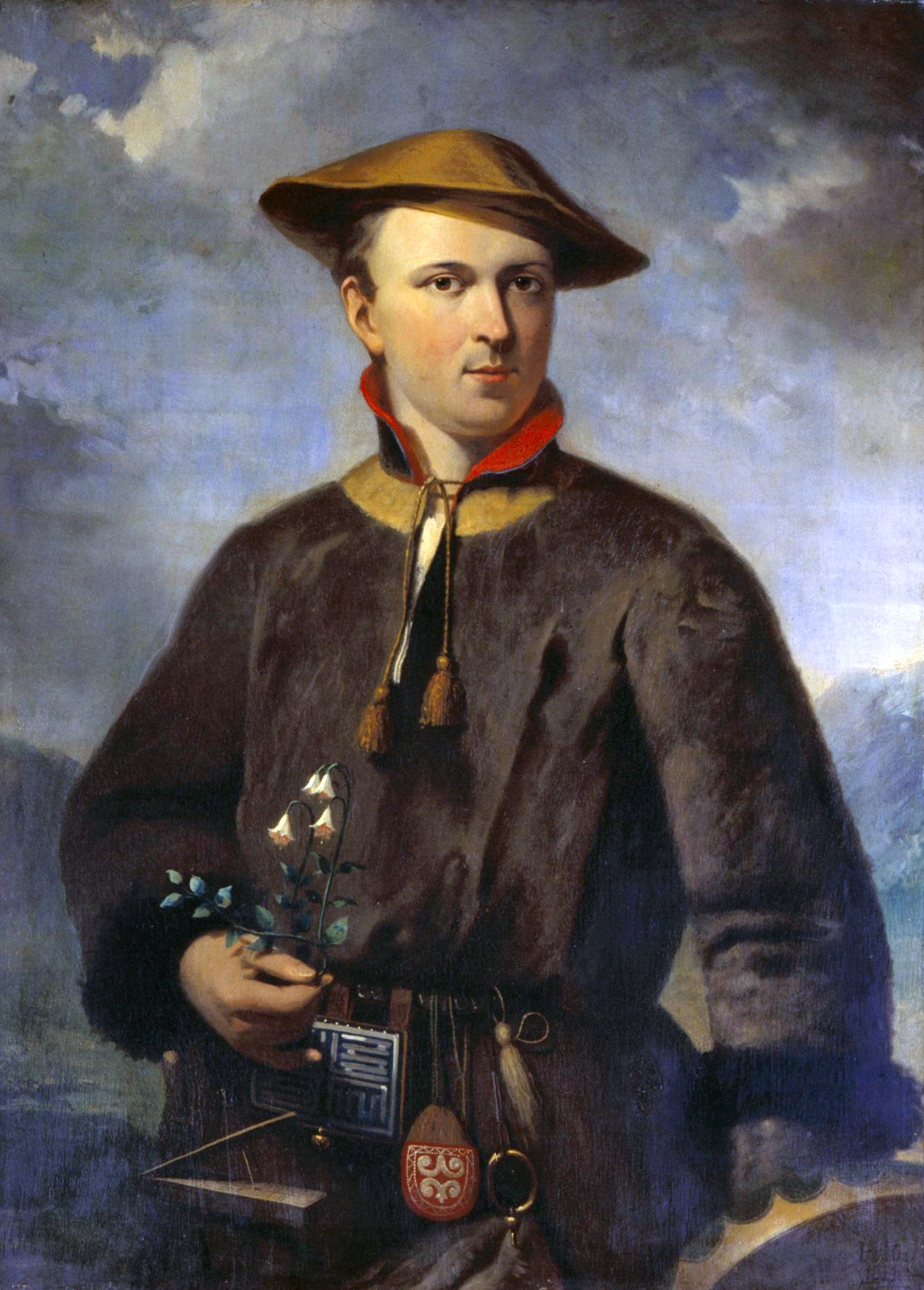
Linnaeus in the traditional dress of the Sami people of Lapland, (Note: For a full view of the clothing and drum, see File:Carl Linnaeus dressed as a Laplander.jpg Regarding the Sami drums and their religion, Blunt (2001; Pages 45 and 54) recounts two anecdotes from Linnaeus' Lapland expedition: Linnaeus showed a Sami some of his highly accurate drawings of wildlife; the man "was alarmed at the sight, took off his cap, bowed, and remained with head down and his hand on his breast as if in veneration, muttering to himself and trembling as if he were just going to faint." This was because "he thought the drawings magical, like those on the drums of his own country, and Linnaeus a wizard." At another time, Linnaeus was "told that when a [Sami] refused to surrender objects of his religion such as his magic drum or his idols to the missionaries, his coat would be removed and he would be held down while the main artery in his arm was opened; he was then left to bleed until he had promised to come to heel – a procedure, says Linnaeus, that was 'often successful'.") holding the Twinflower that became his personal emblem.

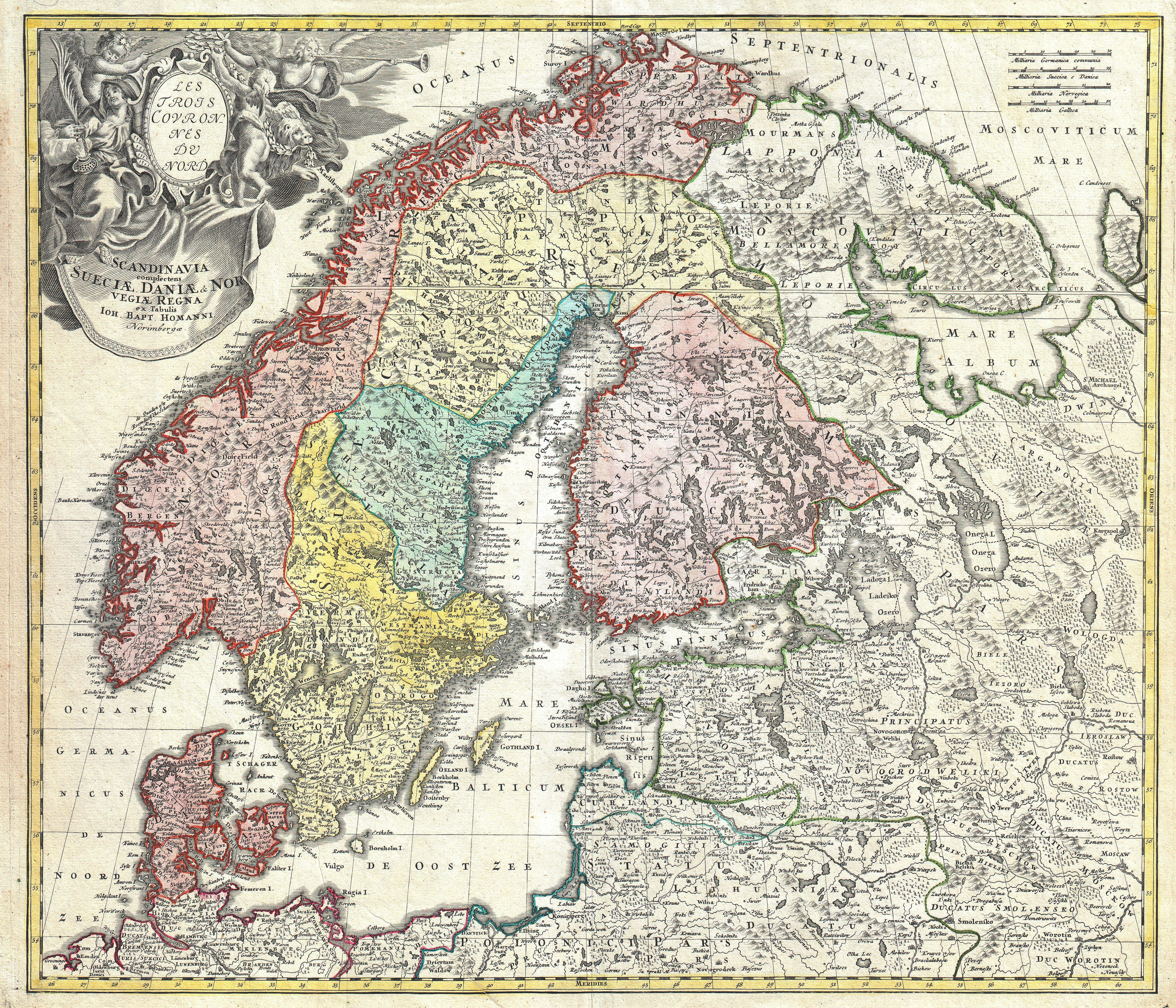
Contemporary map by Johann Homann (printed c. 1730) depicting the Scandinavian region of Europe; Lapland is the pale yellow area in the upper-middle. (Note: In 1809 Lapland was split between Sweden and the newly formed Grand Duchy of Finland; for the region traditionally inhabited by the Sami people which stretched from Norway to Russia, see Sápmi (area).)

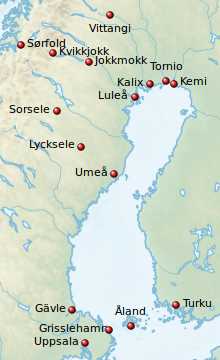
Waypoints for Linnaeus' Lapland expedition. (Note: See also this map showing Linnaeus' travels during his Lapland expedition via from Linné, Carl von. 1991. Lappländische Reise und andere Schriften. Leipzig.)

The expedition to Lapland, the northernmost region in Sweden, by Carl Linnaeus between May and October 1732 was an important part of his scientific career.

Linnaeus departed from Uppsala and travelled clockwise around the coast of the Gulf of Bothnia over the course of six months, making major inland incursions from Umeå, Luleå and Tornio. His observations became the basis of his book Flora Lapponica (1737) in which Linnaeus’ ideas about nomenclature and classification were first used in a practical way. Linnaeus kept a journal of his expedition which was first published posthumously as an English translation called Lachesis Lapponica: A Tour in Lapland (1811).

== Background ==
In April 1732, Linnaeus was awarded a grant from the Royal Society of Sciences in Uppsala for his journey. Olof Rudbeck the Younger, one of Linnaeus' former professors at Uppsala University, had made an expedition to Lapland in 1695, but the detailed results of his exploration were lost in a fire seven years afterwards. Linnaeus' hope was to find new plants, animals and possibly valuable minerals. He was also curious about the customs of the native Sami people, reindeer-herding nomads who wandered the vast tundras of Fennoscandia.

== Uppsala to Umeå ==
Linnaeus began his expedition from Uppsala in May; he travelled on foot and horse, bringing with him his journal, botanical and ornithological manuscripts and sheets of paper for pressing plants. It took him 11 days to reach Umeå, via Gävle (near which he found great quantities of Campanula serpyllifolia, later known as Linnaea borealis, the twinflower that would become his favourite). He sometimes dismounted on the way to examine a flower or rock and was particularly interested in mosses and lichens, the latter a main part of the diet of the reindeer, a common animal in Lapland.

== First inland incursion ==
From Umeå, Linnaeus headed towards Lycksele, a town much further inland from the coast than he had traveled until then, examining water birds on the way. After five days, he reached the town and stayed with the pastor and his wife. He then attempted to reach Sorsele but had to turn around at a place called Lycksmyran ("lucky marsh") due to extremely difficult conditions. In the beginning of June he returned to Umeå after having spent additional days in Lycksele, and learning more of the customs of the Sami. (See e.g. Tablut)

== Umeå to Luleå and second inland incursion ==
After returning to Umeå, he travelled further north along the coast of the Gulf of Bothnia, via Skellefteå and Old Piteå, passing Old Luleå where he received a Sami woman's cap on the way. From Luleå he again traveled inland, following the Lule River via Jokkmokk on the Arctic Circle and Kvikkjokk (then Hyttan), into the Scandinavian Mountains, crossing the border into Norway, arriving in Sørfold on the coast and making a trip to nearby Rörstadt. He then returned the way he came, approximately 300 kilometres (190 mi) back to Luleå.

== Luleå to Tornio, third inland incursion and return to Uppsala ==
Linnaeus then continued his travel along the coast to Tornio (Torneå in Swedish), from which he made his third and final inland incursion, along the Torne River as far as Vittangi. He spent some time in the Tornio area; in Kalix he received instructions in assaying. In the middle of September he began his return journey. Travelling via Kemi, he followed the Finnish coastline to Turku (Åbo in Swedish), where he sailed via Åland, arriving in Sweden in Grisslehamn and then finally home to Uppsala.

== Results ==
He returned from his six-month-long, over 2,000 kilometres (1,200 mi) expedition on 10 October, having gathered and observed many plants, birds and rocks. Although Lapland was a region with limited biodiversity, Linnaeus described about a hundred previously undescribed plants. The details of his discoveries became the basis of his book Flora Lapponica.

Linnaeus's account of the journey, Iter Lapponicum was translated into English by James Edward Smith and published in 1811 as Lachesis Lapponica: A Tour in Lapland. Some of Linnaeus' original illustrations:

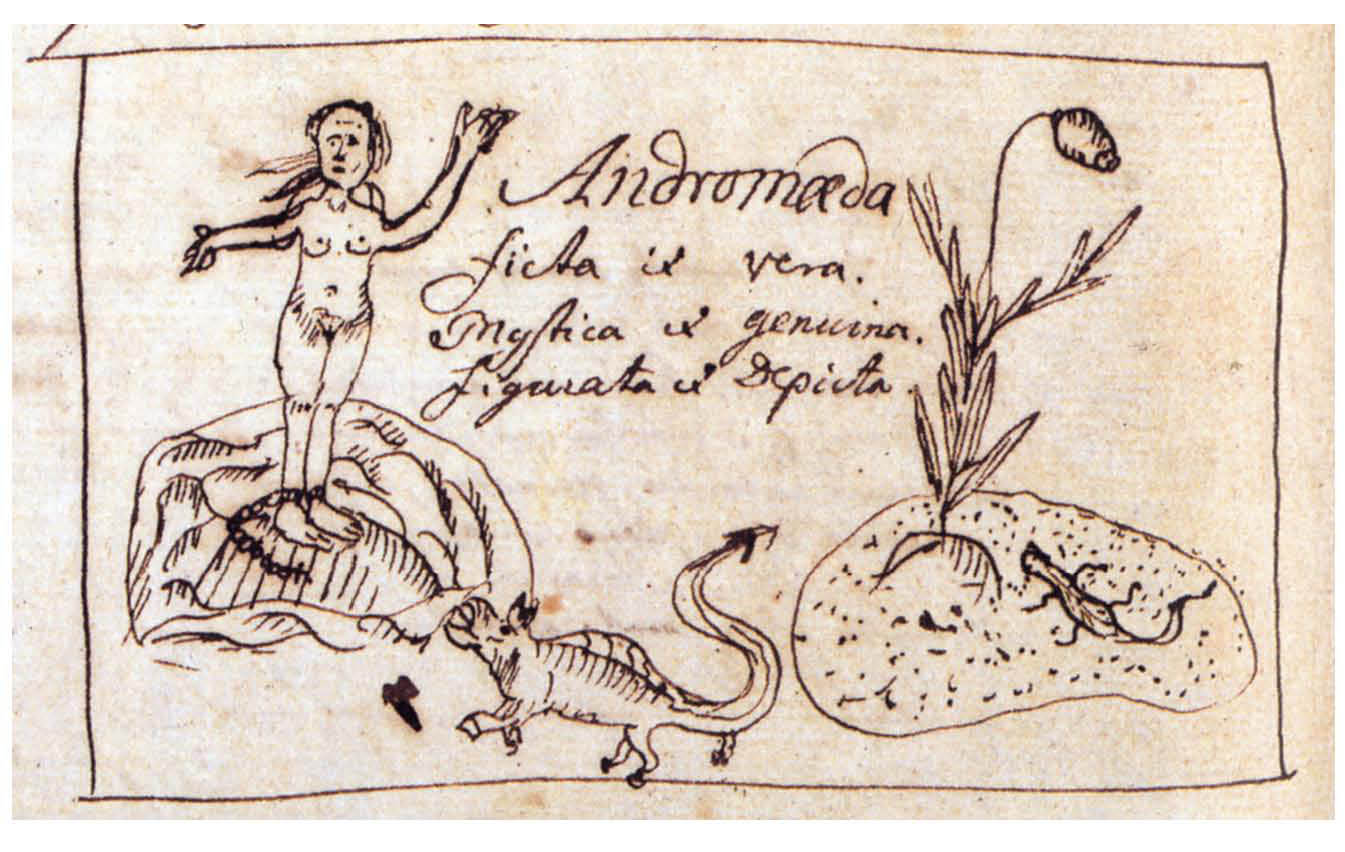
The mythological Andromeda and the plant he named for her.

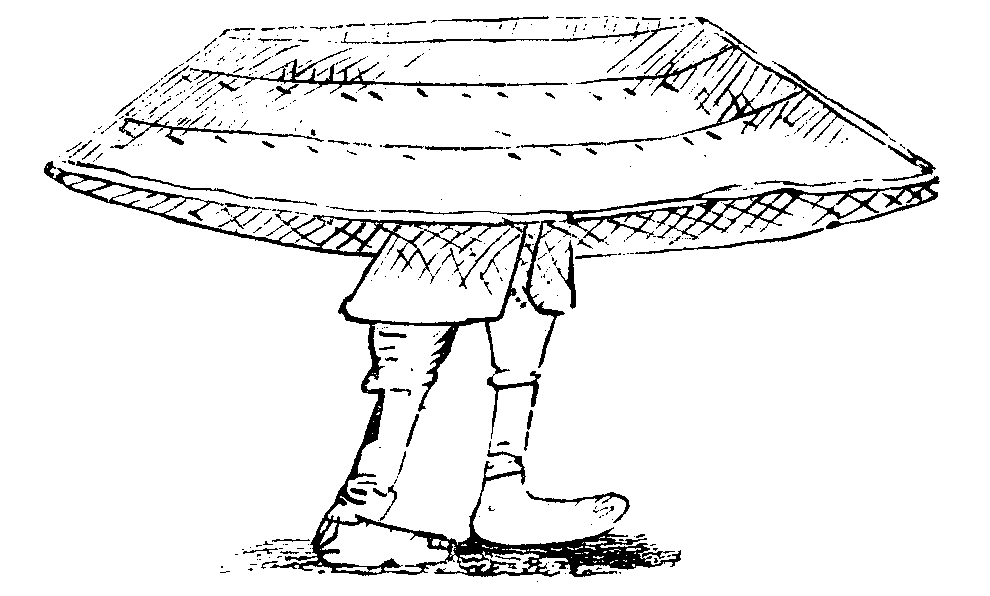
A Sami carrying his boat.

== Bibliography ==
- Anderson, Margaret J. (1997). Carl Linnaeus: father of classification. United States: Enslow Publishers. ISBN 978-0-89490-786-9.
- Blunt, Wilfrid (2001). Linnaeus: the compleat naturalist. London: Frances Lincoln. ISBN 0-7112-1841-2.
- Blunt, Wilfrid (2004). Linnaeus: the compleat naturalist. London: Frances Lincoln. ISBN 0-7112-2362-9.
- Broberg, Gunnar (2006). Carl Linnaeus. Stockholm: Swedish Institute. ISBN 91-520-0912-2.
- Linnaeus, Carl (1811). Lachesis Lapponica: A Tour in Lapland. Tr. James Edward Smith. London: White and Cochrane.
- Stöver, Dietrich Johann Heinrich (1794). Joseph Trapp (ed.). The life of Sir Charles Linnæus. London: Library of Congress. ISBN 0-19-850122-6.
