= Flora Svecica =

Book by Carolus Linnaeus

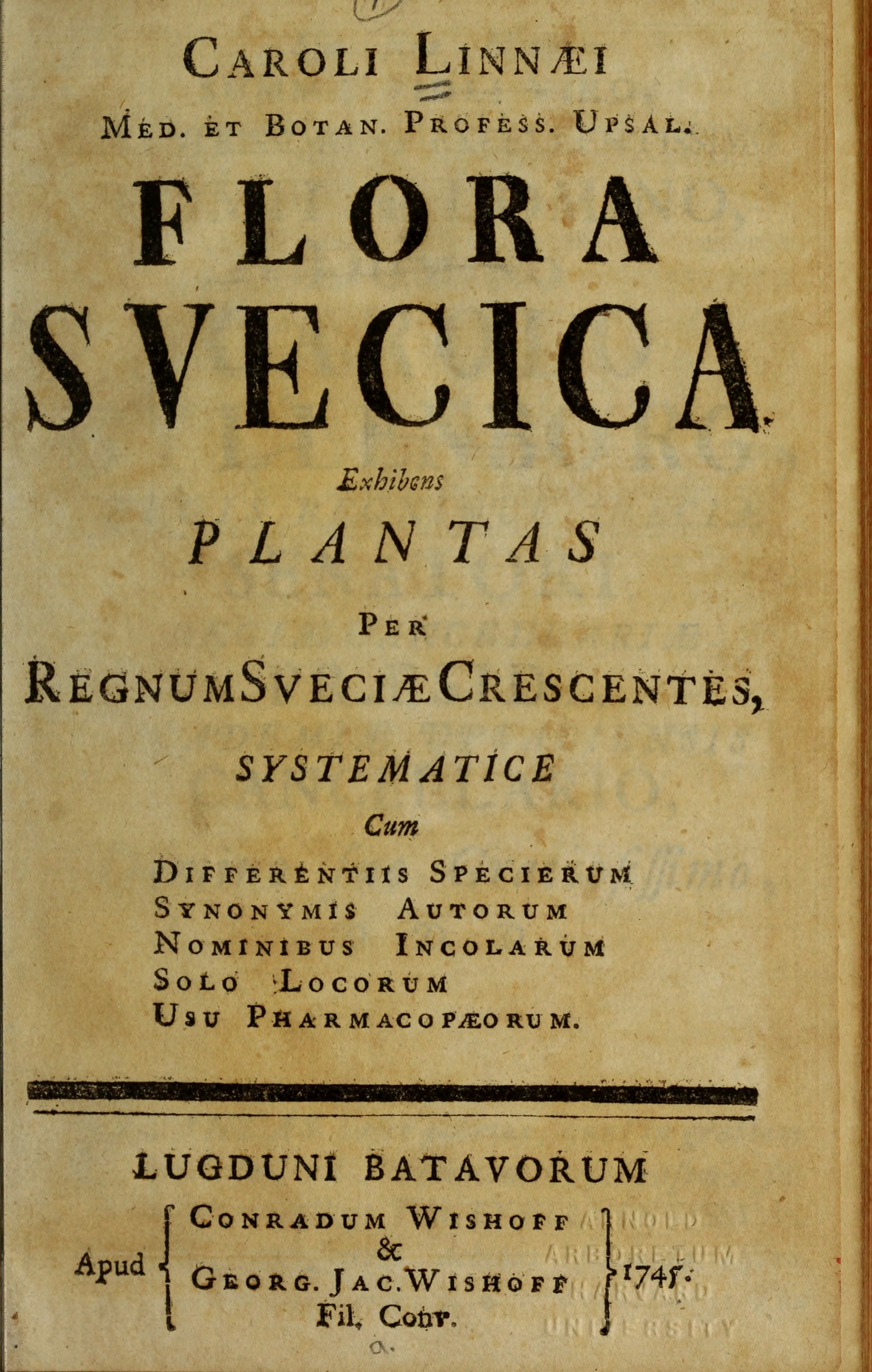
Title page of Linnaeus's Flora Svecica (1745)

Flora Svecica ("Flora of Sweden", ed. 1, Stockholm, 1745; ed. 2 Stockholm, 1755) was written by Swedish botanist, physician, zoologist and naturalist Carl Linnaeus (1707–1778).

This was the first full account of the plants growing in Sweden and one of the first examples of the Flora in the modern idiom. The full title of the publication was Flora Svecica: Enumerans Plantas Sueciae Indigenas Cum Synopsi Classium Ordinumque, Characteribus Generum, Differentiis Specierum, Synonymis Citationibusque Selectis - Locis Regionibusque Natalibus - Descriptionibus Habitualibus Nomina Incolarum Et Qualitat.

== Bibliographic details ==
Full bibliographic details including exact dates of publication, pagination, editions, facsimiles, brief outline of contents, location of copies, secondary sources, translations, reprints, manuscripts, travelogues, and commentaries are given in Stafleu and Cowan's Taxonomic Literature.

== See also ==
- Flora Lapponica
