= Genera Plantarum =

1737 book by Carl Linnaeus

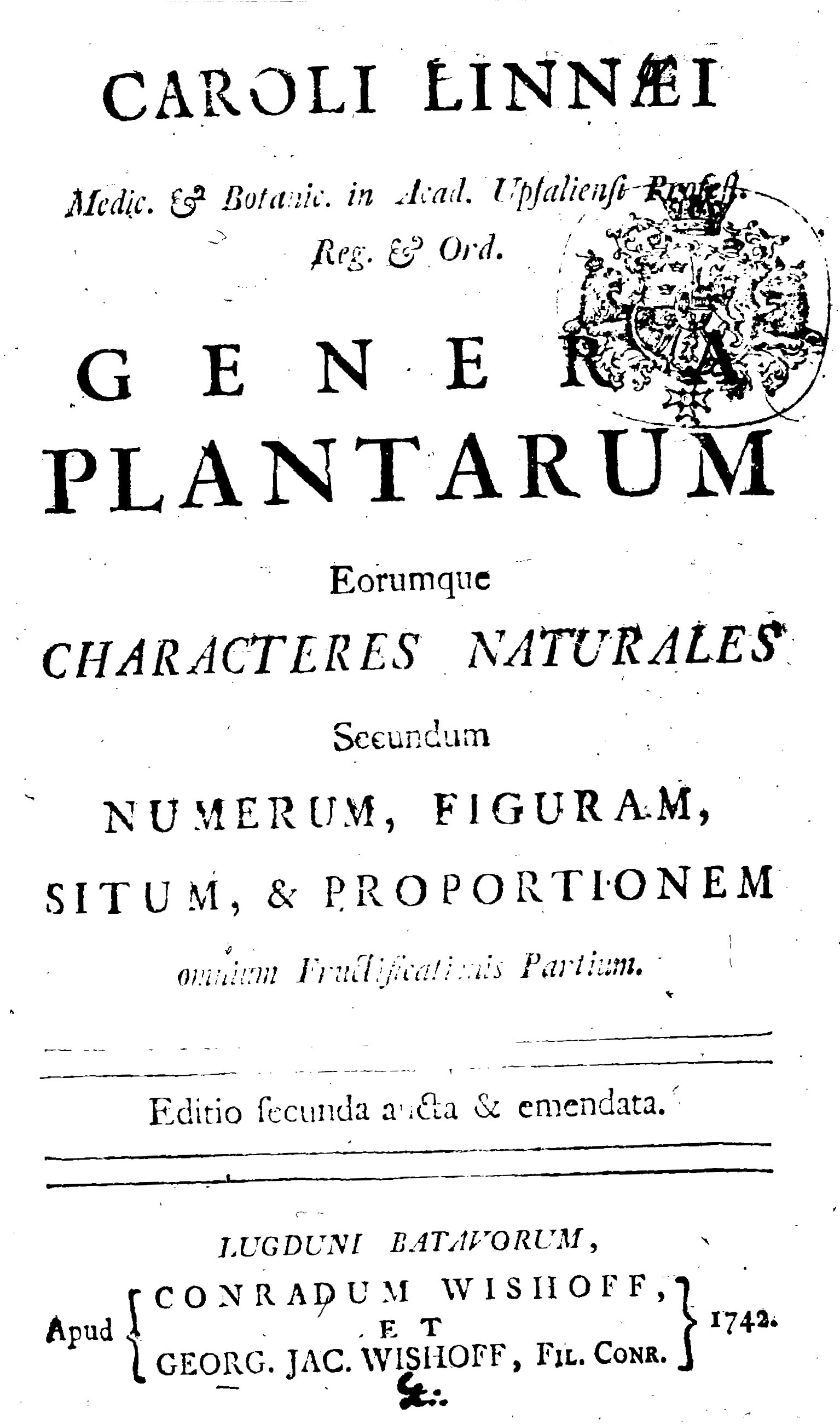
Title page of the second edition of Linnaeus's Genera Plantarum, Leiden, 1742

Genera Plantarum is a publication of Swedish naturalist Carl Linnaeus (1707–1778). The first edition was issued in Leiden, 1737. The fifth edition served as a complementary volume to Species Plantarum (1753). Article 13 of the International Code of Nomenclature for algae, fungi, and plants states that "Generic names that appear in Linnaeus' Species Plantarum ed. 1 (1753) and ed. 2 (1762–63) are associated with the first subsequent description given under those names in Linnaeus' Genera Plantarum ed. 5 (1754) and ed. 6 (1764)." This defines the starting point for nomenclature of most groups of plants.

The first edition of Genera Plantarum contains brief descriptions of the 935 plant genera that were known to Linnaeus at that time. It is dedicated to Herman Boerhaave, a Leiden physician who introduced Linnaeus to George Clifford and the medico-botanical Dutch establishment of the day. Genera Plantarum employed his “sexual system” of classification, in which plants are grouped according to the number of stamens and pistils in the flower. Genera Plantarum was revised several times by Linnaeus, the fifth edition being published in August 1754 (eds. 3 and 4 were not edited by Linnaeus) and linked to the first edition of Species Plantarum. Over the 16 years that passed between the publication of the first and fifth editions the number of genera listed had increased from 935 to 1105.

Linnaeus established the system of binomial nomenclature through the widespread acceptance of his list of plants in the 1753 edition of Species Plantarum, which is now taken as the starting point for all botanical nomenclature. Genera Plantarum was an integral part of this first stepping stone towards a universal standardised biological nomenclature.

== History ==
From 1735 to 1738 Linnaeus worked in the Netherlands where he was personal physician to George Clifford (1685–1760), a wealthy Anglo-Dutch merchant–banker with an impressive garden containing four large glasshouses that were filled with warmth-loving plants from overseas. Linnaeus was enthralled by these collections and prepared a detailed systematic catalogue of the plants in the garden, which he published in 1738 as Hortus Cliffortianus. This list was published with engravings by Georg Ehret (1708–1770) and Jan Wandelaer (1690–1759). Linnaeus included Ehret's Tabella (an illustration of his "Sexual System" of plant classification) in his Genera Plantarum but without credit to the artist. This provoked the accusation from Ehret that "When he was a beginner [Linnaeus] appropriated everything for himself which he heard of, to make himself famous". Nevertheless, Ehret probably met Linnaeus again when the latter visited London for a month. The time in the Netherlands was a productive one for Linnaeus because in these four years he also published Systema Naturae (1735), Bibliotheca Botanica (1736), Fundamenta Botanica (1736), Flora Lapponica (1737) and Critica Botanica (1737), this is in addition to his Genera Plantarum (1737).

One of Linnaeus's main points is that a botanist can and must know all genera, and must memorise their ‘definitions’ (diagnosis). The natural definitions given in the various editions of the Genera Plantarum are intended to facilitate this. Stability of generic taxonomy was one of his first aims, and the way he went about achieving it aroused the criticism of many of his contemporaries. Yet, this generic reform was one of his greatest achievements: his genera and their nomenclature stand at the beginning of the victory of Linnaean taxonomy. He dealt with the theory of generic names in the Critica Botanica which was a prelude to his main practical work on the subject, the Genera Plantarum. The rules for the formation of generic names are contained in the Fundamenta but are worked out in greater detail in the Critica. The result was a reform of generic definitions that appeared in the Genera Plantarum.

== Publication and dedication ==
The typesetting of Genera Plantarum started in 1736 leading to the publication of the first edition in early 1737; the book was dedicated to Herman Boerhaave, the great Leiden physician to whom Linnaeus owed his introduction into the medico-botanical Dutch establishment of the day. Linnaeus published a revised edition in 1742. The fifth edition appeared in Stockholm, in 1754, and the sixth, the last one edited by Linnaeus himself, in 1764, also in Stockholm. The last edition that was based on Linnaeus's work was the 9th edition, revised by Kurt Sprengel, and issued in Göttingen, 1830–31.

== Botanical background ==
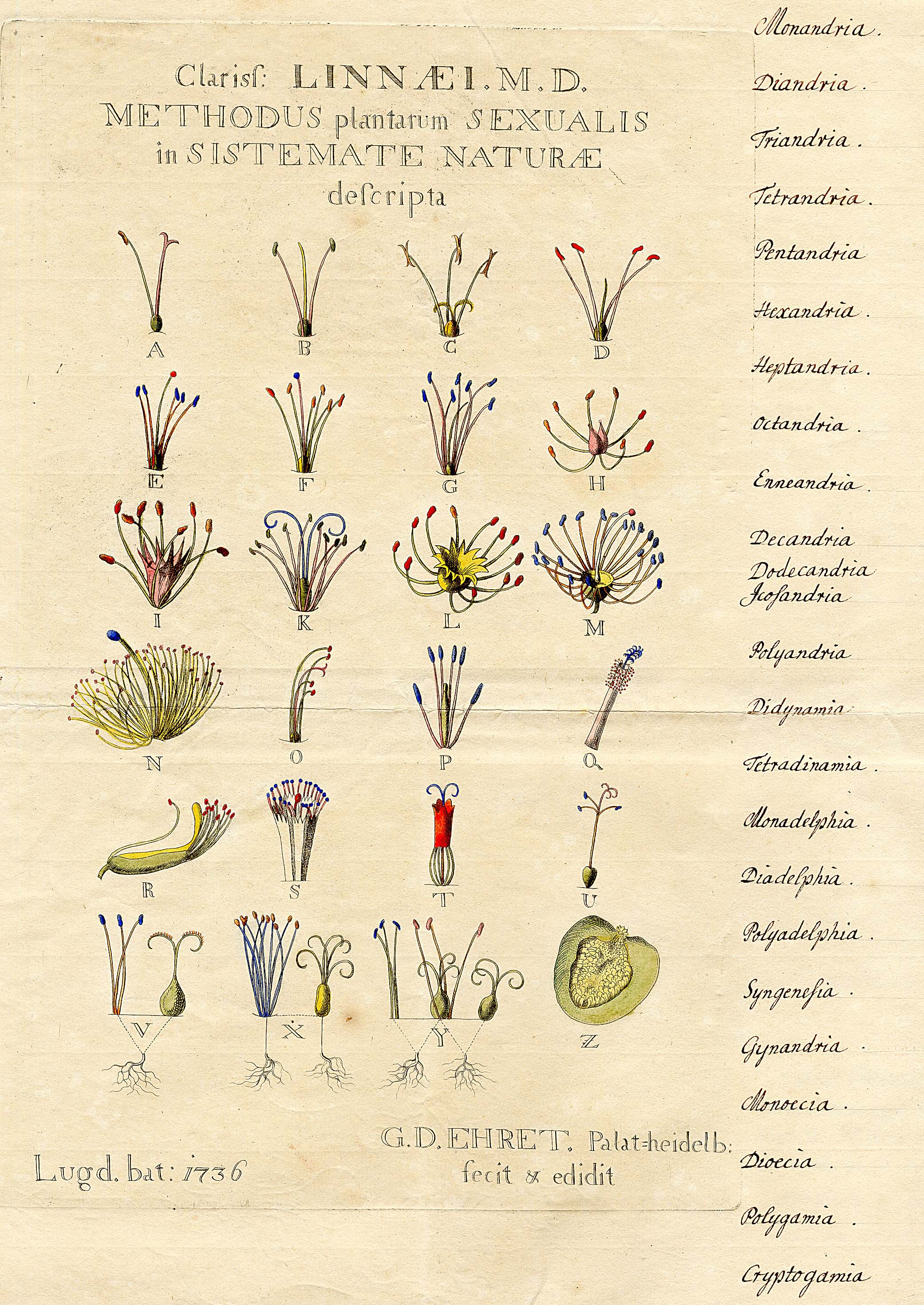
Ehret's illustrations, in Systema Naturae, showing the characters used to determine Linnaeus's 24 classes of plants

In the work Linnaeus divided the plant kingdom into 24 classes, each of which he named according to the number of stamens and their arrangement in the flowers. In Ehret's engraved plate these classes are represented by the 24 letters of the Latin alphabet. In Ehret's original drawing for the plate, preserved in the Natural History Museum in London, he has written the name of the plant he had chosen as an example of each particular class, but only for the first ten and last four classes. Each of the first ten classes (A–K) is named according to the number of stamens, beginning with Monandria (one stamen), Diandria (two stamens), etc. up to Decandria (ten stamens). The flowers in the eleventh (L) class, Dodecandria, have 12–19 stamens. The following four classes (M–P) are characterized not only by the number of stamens but also by their position; the four classes (Q–T) have stamens united in a bundle or phalanx, the next three classes (V–Y) have stamens and pistils in separate flowers. The whole is completed with Cryptogamia (Z), which are plants without proper flowers. For this class Ehret chose the fig as an example.

== Nomenclatural importance ==
By far the most important edition for nomenclature today is the fifth, published in August 1754 (editions 3 and 4 were not edited by Linnaeus); this is the edition which is linked nomenclaturally with the Species Plantarum, the starting point for the naming of most groups of plants.

The genus descriptions in this edition were original, methodically and tersely drafted according to his own plan, with an asterisk * following the generic name to indicate that he had studied living material, a dagger † to indicate that he had seen only herbarium material, and the absence of these signs to indicate he had seen no material himself and hence depended upon the literature or correspondence. In preparing a description of a genus he would describe the flower and fruit of the main species most familiar to him and then remove the characters that did not occur in other species. As new species were added Linnaeus should have updated his genus descriptions but in practice did not have time to do so. As a result, some species listed in Species Plantarum do not fit the descriptions in Genus Plantarum. All generic names in Genera Plantarum ed. 5 are treated as validly published on 1 May 1753.

== Significance ==
William Stearn states: "The clear typographical layout, the elimination of verbs such as est, occupant and abit, and the much greater detail given for all floral parts ... immediately catch the attention. Such improvements in technique made Linnaeus's Genera Plantarum the model for later works on the genera of plants."

Frans Stafleu regards Genera Plantarum as Linnaeus's most important book with respect to the practical introduction of his ideas – even more than Systema Naturae. The notion that the genus is the basic unit of taxonomy remained in force until the advent of evolutionary biology and biosystematics. "His reform was daring and thorough, based on an exceptional and practical knowledge of plants; although influenced by somewhat outmoded ideas, it had exactly the salutary effect which he wanted it to have: consistency and simplicity. These two were prime needs for taxonomy in 1737."

== Bibliography ==
- Stafleu, Frans Antonie (1971). Linnaeus and the Linnaeans: The spreading of their ideas in systematic botany, 1735–1789. Utrecht: Oosthoek. ISBN 90-6046-064-2. OL 27071356M.
- Stearn, William T. (1960) [1754]. "Introduction: Notes on Linnaeus's 'Genera Plantarum'". Genera Plantarum. By Linnaeus, Carl. Cramer, J.; Swann, H. K. (eds.). Historiae Naturalis Classica. Vol. 3 (1960 facsimile of 5th ed.). Weinheim: Wheldon & Wesley, Ltd. pp. v–xxiv. OCLC 896638426. OL 26620909M.
- Stearn, William T. (1971). "Appendix: Linnaean Classification, Nomenclature, and Method". The Compleat Naturalist: A Life of Linnaeus. By Blunt, Wilfrid. New York: The Viking Press. pp. 242–252. LCCN 78-147393. OL 22131063M. SBN 670-23396-X.
- Stearn, William T. (1986). "Linnaeus and his students". In Goode, Patrick; Lancaster, Michael (eds.). The Oxford Companion to Gardens. Consultant editors: Sir Geoffrey Jellico and Susan Jellico. Oxford University Press. pp. 338–340. ISBN 0-19-866123-1.
