= Fundamenta Botanica =

1736 book by Carl Linnaeus

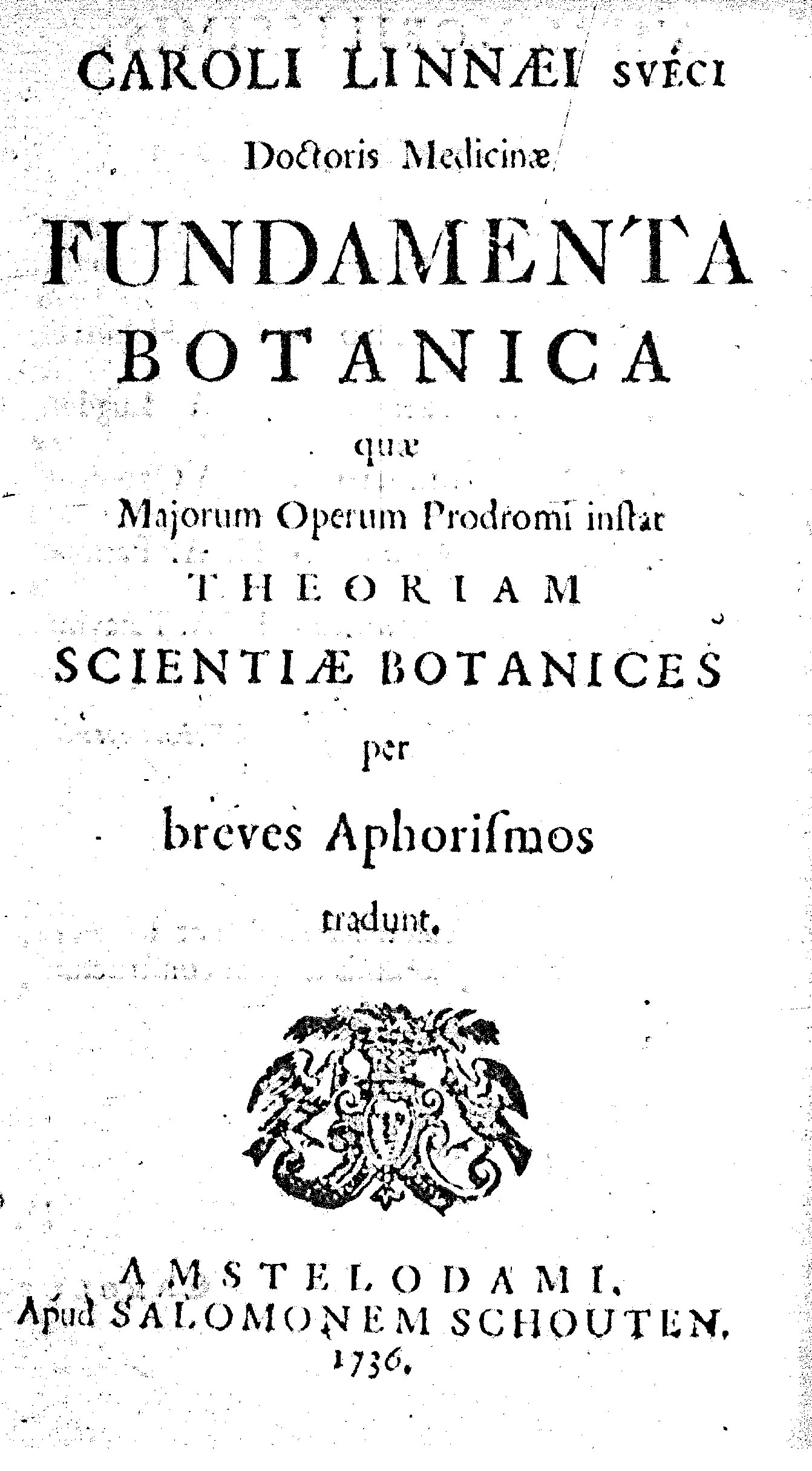
Title page of Linnaeus's Fundamenta Botanica of 1736

Fundamenta Botanica ("Foundations of botany") (Amsterdam, Salomon Schouten, ed. 1, 1736) was one of the major works of the Swedish botanist, zoologist and physician Carl Linnaeus (1707–1778) and issued both as a separate work and as part of the Bibliotheca Botanica.

== Publication and reprints ==
This book states, for the first time, Linnaeus's ideas for the reformation of botanical taxonomy. The first edition is dated 1736 but it was released on 14 September 1735 (Linnaeus wrote in his personal copy "Typus absolutus 1735, Sept 3".). The full title was Fundamenta Botanica, quae Majorum Operum Prodromi instar Theoriam Scientiae Botanices by breves Aphorismos tradunt.

The first edition was dedicated to Olof Rudbeck, Lorenz Heister, Adriaan van Royen, Johann Jacob Dillen, Antoine de Jussieu, Giulio Pontedera, Johann Amman, Johannes Burman, Pierre Magnol and Giuseppe Monti.

A second edition was published in Stockholm in 1740 and a third in Amsterdam in 1741. The publication of this work as well as Genera Plantarum and Systema Naturae was encouraged by Herman Boerhaave, who had been Linnaeus's teacher.

== Impact ==
The Fundamenta in combination with the Critica Botanica lays Linnaeus's foundations for his system of nomenclature, classification and botanical terminology that were later reviewed and expanded in the Philosophia Botanica (1751). He does this by means of 365 aphorisms (principles) arranged into 12 chapters:

== Table of contents ==
VIRIS NOBILISSIMIS (Dedication to men to honor)
BOTANICIS CELEBERRIMIS (Dedication to famous botanists)
PRAEFATIO (Preface)

FUNDAMENTA BOTANICA (Botanical fundamentals or fundamental botanical aphorisms)

I. BIBLIOTHECA (library), Aphorismen : articles 1-52 (page 1-5)
II. SYSTEMATA (systematics) : articles 53–77 (pages 5-7)
III. PLANTAE (plants) : articles 78–85 (pages 7-9)
IV. FRUCTIFICATIO (fruit carrier) : articles 86–131 (pages 10-15)
V. SEXUS (sex) : articles 132–150 (pages 15-17)
VI. CHARACTERES (characterisation) : articles 151–209 (pages 18-22)
VII. NOMINA (nouns or names) : articles 210–255 (pages 23-26)
VIII. DIFFERENTIAE (distinction) : articles 256–305 (pages 26-29)
IX. VARIATIONES (Varieties) : articles 306–317 (pages 30-31)
X. SYNONYMA (synonyms) : articles 318–324 (pages 31-31)
XI. ADUMBRATIONES (description) : articles 325–335 (pages 31-32)
XII. VIRES (forces) : articles 336–365 (pages 33-35)

CONCLUSIONES EX DICTIS (Conclusion from the foregoing) I-XII (page 36)

== Bibliographic details ==
Full bibliographic details including exact dates of publication, pagination, editions, facsimiles, brief outline of contents, location of copies, secondary sources, translations, reprints, manuscripts, travelogues, and commentaries are given in Stafleu and Cowan's Taxonomic Literature.

== Bibliography ==
- Stafleu, Frans A. & Cowan, Richard S. 1981. "Taxonomic Literature. A Selective Guide to Botanical Publications with dates, Commentaries and Types. Vol III: Lh–O." Regnum Vegetabile 105.
