= Flora Lapponica =

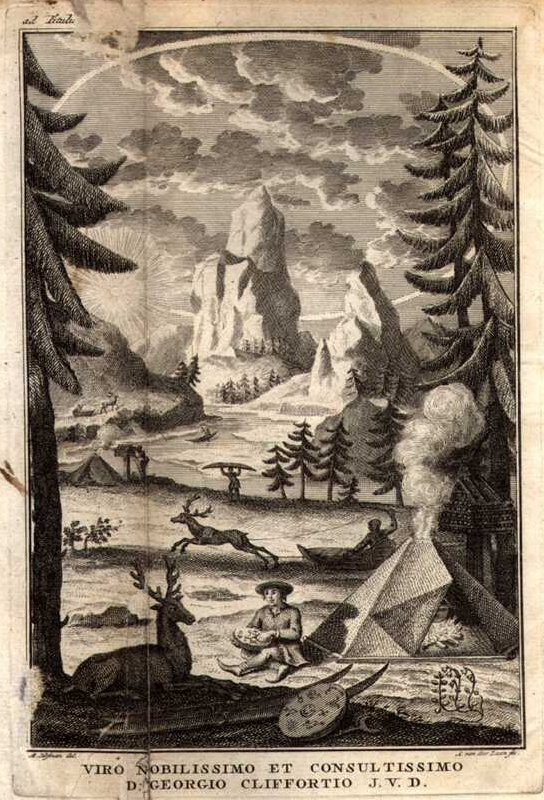
Frontispiece of Flora Lapponica

Flora Lapponica (Amsterdam, 1737) is an account of the plants of Lapland written by botanist, zoologist and naturalist Carl Linnaeus (1707–1788) following his expedition to Lapland.

== Background ==
Over the period from 12 May 1732 to 10 September 1732, and with a grant from the Royal Society of Sciences in Uppsala for his journey, Linnaeus was able to combine his interest in medicine with that of natural history to travel for five months in Lapland collecting animals, plants, and minerals.

== Classification used ==
In Flora Lapponica Linnaeus's ideas about nomenclature and classification were first used in a practical way, making this the first proto-modern Flora. The account covered 534 species, used the Linnaean classification system and included, for the described species, geographical distribution and taxonomic notes. It was Augustin Pyramus de Candolle who attributed Linnaeus with Flora Lapponica as the first example in the botanical genre of Flora writing. Botanical historian E.L. Greene described Flora Lapponica as “the most classic and delightful of Linnaeus’s writings”.

== Commemorative personal names ==
A Lapland plant, Linnaea borealis, was named by the eminent botanist Jan Frederik Gronovius in commemoration of Linnaeus's achievements. In the Critica Botanica Linnaeus uses this name to advocate the use of commemorative personal names as botanical names:

it is commonly believed that the name of a plant which is derived from that of a botanist shows no connection between the two...[but]...Linnaea was named by the celebrated Gronovius and is a plant of Lapland, lowly, insignificant, disregarded, flowering but for a brief space – after Linnaeus who resembles it.

== Updated edition ==
An update of this work was published in 1792 by James Edward Smith, citing Linnaeus as the main author and using Linnaeus' binomial nomenclature. These books are not to be confused with Gerog (Göran) Walhenberg's 1812 "Flora Lapponica", who organized species according to their vegetation types and geographic areas.
