= Bibliotheca Botanica =

Book by Carl Linnaeus

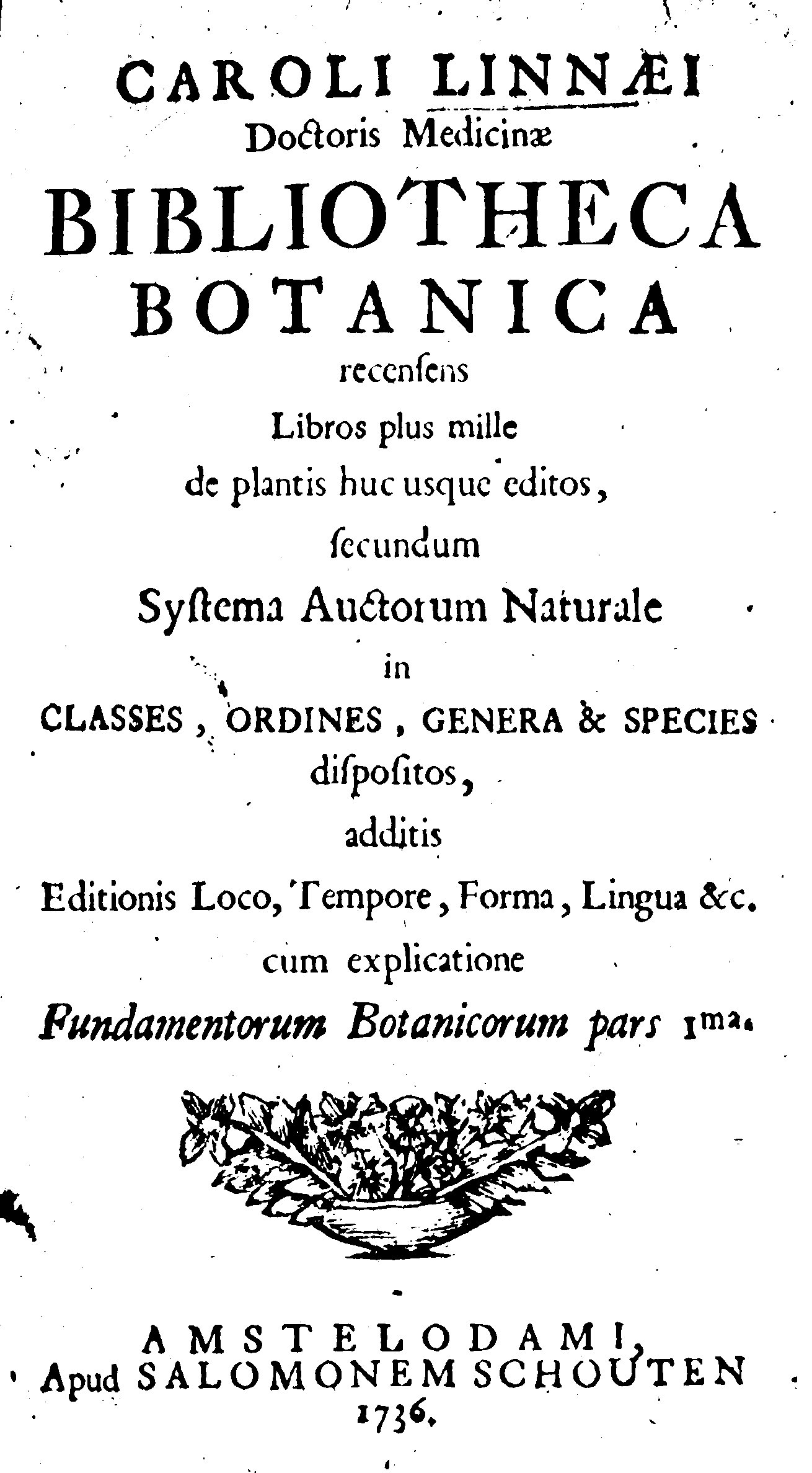
Title page of Linnaeus's Bibliotheca Botanica, 1736

Bibliotheca Botanica ("Bibliography of botany", Amsterdam, 1736, Salomen Schouten; 2nd edn., 1751) is a botany book by Swedish naturalist Carl Linnaeus (1707–1778). The book was written and published in Amsterdam when Linnaeus was twenty-eight and dedicated to the botanist Johannes Burman (1707–1779). The first edition appeared in 1736 with the full title Bibliotheca Botanica recensens libros plus mille de plantis huc usque editos secundum systema auctorum naturale in classes, ordines, genera et species; it was an elaborate classification system for his catalogue of books.

A digest of Bibliotheca Botanica, which elaborated on the first chapter of the Fundamenta Botanica, is given in Aphorisms 5–52 of the Philosophia Botanica.

== Botanical history ==
The Preface, dated 8 August 1735, on pages 2–19 contains Linnaeus's extended account of botanical history in the form of a botanical analogy; in pages 2–3 Linnaeus lists previous bibliographers and then gives his account of botanical history leading to a golden age lasting from 1683 to 1703 (see also Incrementa Botanices, Biuur 1753 and Reformatio Botanices, Reftelius, 1762, for other historical notes by Linnaeus). The Preface mentions that Bibliotheca Botanica was the first part of a planned Bibliotheca medica (which he did not produce).

Linnaean authority Frans Stafleu describes the book:

The Bibliotheca is a concise history of botany in a dry, enumerative, but very efficient style. Linnaeus describes the development of botanical science by subdividing the authors in various categories and by adding several statements on the main events in human affairs without which the growth of botany as a science cannot be understood. The often enlightening and amusing names for the various categories of botanists show not only a good knowledge of the literature, but also an awareness of the fact that botanical history is human history.

== Botanical bibliographies ==
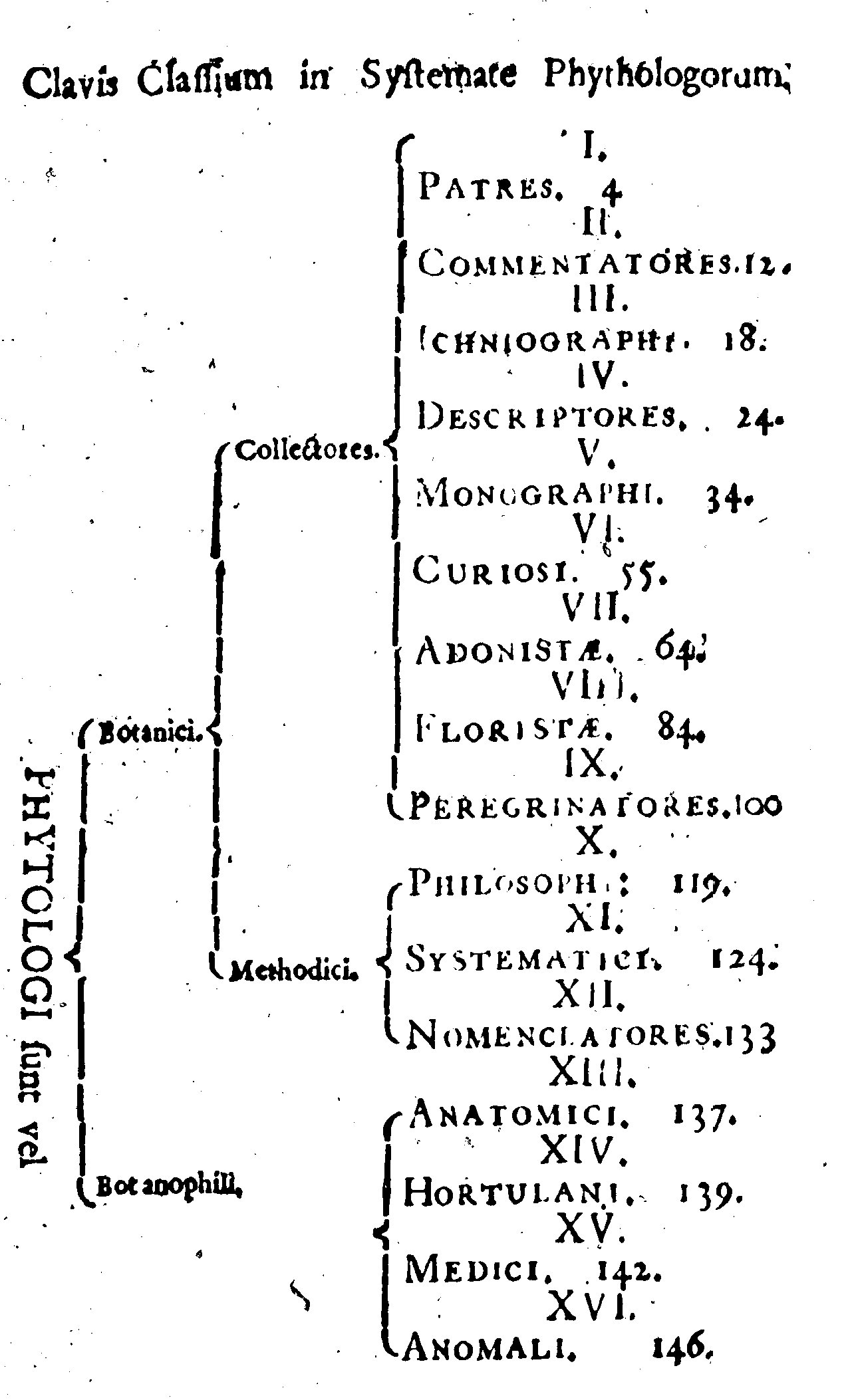
Linnaeus's method for classifying the elements of Bibliotheca Botanica

The term "methodists" (methodici, equivalent to present-day systematists) was coined by Linnaeus in his Bibliotheca Botanica to denote the authors who care about the principles of classification in contrast to the collectors who are concerned primarily with the description of plants paying little or no attention to their arrangement into genera etc. For Linnaeus the important early Methodists were Italian physician and botanist Andrea Caesalpino, the English naturalist John Ray, German physician and botanist Augustus Quirinus Rivinus, and a French physician, botanist, and traveller Joseph Pitton de Tournefort.

Botanical bibliography effectively began, as did bibliography in general, with the work of the sixteenth-century Swiss natural historian and polymath Conrad Gesner (1516–1565). His Bibliotheca Universalis, a general compendium of some 12,000 items in Latin, Greek, or Hebrew arranged by authors' forenames, appeared in 1545 as an attempt to bring some order into the rapidly increasing range of literature consequent to the Renaissance and the introduction of printing.

The Bibliotheca Botanica was the first botanical bibliography arranged by subject. The titles were arranged hierarchically into 16 classes or chapters, each with one or more ordines or sections. Applying this methodus naturalis to books and people was a mark of his 'scholastic' view of the world. Most subsequent classifications of botanical literature, including geographical entities, would be more or less empirically based highlighting a recurrent conflict between essentialism, empiricism, nominalism and other doctrines in the theory and practice of any kind of classification.

== Birth of the word biology ==
Linnaeus employed the Latin term biologi to refer to botanists who wrote about the life cycle of plants, the first use of the term.

== Historical assessment ==
Heller notes the incomplete coverage of material, incorrect dating of books, and many minor errors in his book descriptions. Also, that his "natural method" of classifying books was "not very practical".

== Bibliographic details ==
Full bibliographic details including exact dates of publication, pagination, editions, facsimiles, brief outline of contents, location of copies, secondary sources, translations, reprints, travelogues, and commentaries are given in Stafleu and Cowan's Taxonomic Literature.

== Bibliography ==
- Frodin, David 2002. Guide to Standard Floras of the World, 2nd ed. Cambridge University Press: Cambridge.
- Heller, John L. 1970. "Linnaeus’s Bibliotheca Botanica". Taxon 19: 363–411.
- Stafleu, Frans A. 1971. Linnaeus and the Linnaeans: the Spreading of their Ideas in Systematic Botany, 1735–1789. Utrecht: International Association for Plant Taxonomy. ISBN 90-6046-064-2.
- Stafleu, Frans A. & Cowan, Richard S. 1981. "Taxonomic Literature. A Selective Guide to Botanical Publications with dates, Commentaries and Types. Vol III: Lh–O." Regnum Vegetabile 105.
