= Frans Stafleu =

Dutch botanist (1921–1997)

- Born: 8 September 1921; Velsen, North Holland, Netherlands
- Died: 16 December 1997 (aged 76); Utrecht, Netherlands
- Known for: Taxonomic Literature: A Selective Guide to Botanical Publications and Collections, with Dates, Commentaries, and Types, and its successor with Richard Sumner Cowan, TL-2
- Scientific career
- Fields: Botany
- Author abbrev. (botany): Stafleu

Frans Antonie Stafleu (8 September 1921 – 16 December 1997) was a Dutch systematic botanist, former Chair of the Institute of Systematic Botany at the University of Utrecht, and author of Taxonomic Literature: A Selective Guide to Botanical Publications and Collections, with Dates, Commentaries, and Types along with 644 other publications. He occupied several positions in the International Association for Plant Taxonomy. The latter organization now triennially awards the Stafleu Medal, "for an excellent publication dealing with historical, bibliographic and/or nomenclatural aspects of plant systematics".

== Selected publications ==
- Stafleu, Frans A.; Cowan, Richard S. (1976–1988). Taxonomic literature: a selective guide to botanical publications and collections with dates, commentaries and types: Taxon. Lit., ed. 2 (TL2) (2nd ed.). Utrecht: Bohn, Scheltema & Holkema. ISBN 90-313-0224-4.
