= List of students of Linnaeus =

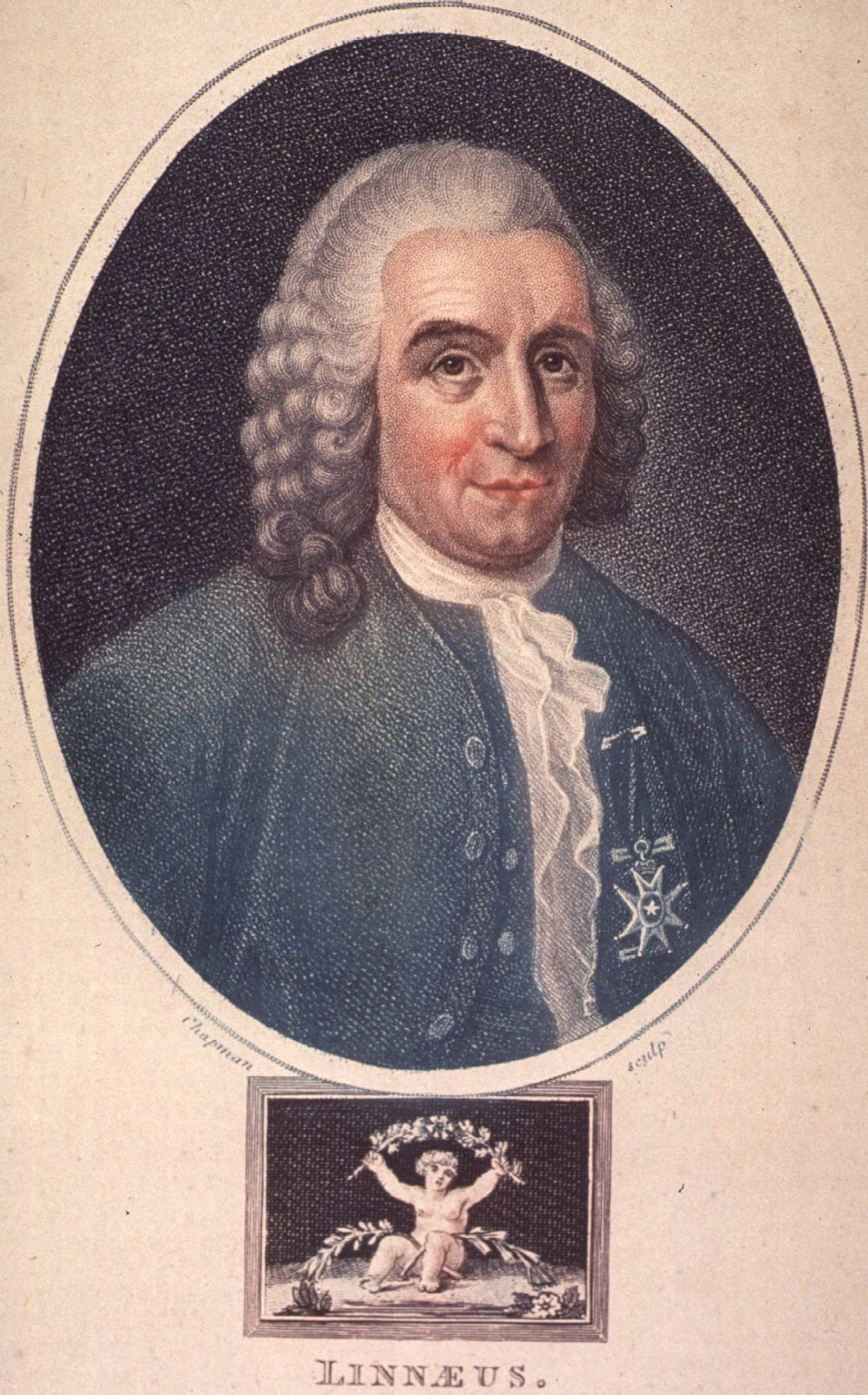
Carl Linnaeus

This list encompasses students of the Swedish naturalist Carl Linnaeus (1707–1778), professor of medicine at Uppsala University from 1741 until 1777, who laid the foundations for the modern scheme of taxonomy and also had a deep indirect influence through his many students.

Individuals in bold italics were Apostles of Linnaeus, Linnaeus' most promising and committed students who made botanical expeditions to various places in the world.

== A-F ==
- Erik Acharius
- **Adam Afzelius**
- **Carl Fredrik Adler**
- Johann Beckmann
- **Andreas Berlin**
- Anders Dahl
- Jonas Carlsson Dryander
- Jakob Friedrich Ehrhart
- Johan Christian Fabricius
- **Johan Peter Falk**
- **Peter Forsskål**

== G-Q ==
- Leonard Gyllenhaal
- Birger Martin Hall
- **Fredric Hasselquist**
- **Pehr Kalm**
- Johann Gerhard König
- Adam Kuhn
- **Pehr Löfling**
- Erik Gustaf Lidbeck
- **Anton Rolandsson Martin**
- **Pehr Osbeck**

== R-Z ==
- **Daniel Rolander**
- **Göran Rothman**
- **Daniel Solander**
- **Anders Erikson Sparrman**
- **Christopher Tärnström**
- Peter Gustaf Tengmalm
- **Carl Peter Thunberg**
- Anders Tidström
- **Olof Torén**
- Martin Vahl
- Johan Gustav Wahlbom 1724–1808

== See also ==
- Peter Artedi (1705–1735), naturalist and friend of Linnaeus, called "the father of Ichthyology".
