= Henry Smeathman =

British entomologist (1742–1786)

Henry Smeathman (1742–1786) was an English naturalist, best known for his work in entomology and colonial settlement in Sierra Leone.

In 1771 the Quaker physician John Fothergill, along with two other members of the Royal Society, Sir Joseph Banks and Marmaduke Tunstall, sponsored Smeathman to spend four years in and around the Sierra Leone peninsula studying its natural history, specifically its insects.

== Life ==
=== Sierra Leone ===
Smeathman made his voyage to Africa aboard a trade ship called the Fly, which was transporting barrels of rum to the West African coast. The Fly arrived at Sierra Leone on 12 December 1771. Smeathman was given some key contacts in West African coast including Afro-European slave trading families, presumably from Drury, Fothergill or Banks. With these contacts, Smeathman was first granted permission to stay in the Banana Islands, where he settled on 17 December 1771, and stayed for more than three years. Upon arrival, Smeathman presented himself to King James Cleveland, an Afro-European slave trader who helped him settle and explore by taking him in through negotiating terms with other members of the local ruling elite (referred to as "kings" or "chiefs" by the traders in the region). In exchange for gifts, Smeathman was given permission to settle on the islands, and he was also given help in his research. He relied on the locals to assist him in constructing a house and he bartered with them in order to obtain local resources. This dependence came about due to the lack of European settlement in his location of residence. Shortly after his arrival, Smeathman contracted a case of what he described as malaria. Though he claimed that he had cured himself with Dr. Fothergill's advice and his medical books that he had brought along, he suffered from symptoms of the disease until his death from a fever, which was fifteen years after initial exposure.

Although his voyage was sponsored in large part by anti-slavery Quakers like John Fothergill, Smeathman relied on individuals involved in slave-trading networks, such as British slave-trader Miles Barber, for support and assistance. He initially vowed to tell the truth about "those little-known and much misrepresented people, the Negroes." However, being lonely and dependent on the slave traders for food, protection, and transportation, "compromise by compromise", he slowly integrated himself into the system. He and Andreas Berlin, his botanist assistant, frequently socialized and played golf with slave-trading merchants and agents. By around 1774, he began to trade slaves in exchange for supplies for his expeditions. In fact, Smeathman seems to have regarded slave traders as 'gentlemen' and tried to refashion himself as one of them.

Smeathman travelled and gathered specimens throughout the Sherbro area, the Kamaranka River, and the Sierra Leone River estuary. In addition, he visited Bunce Island to ship out his specimens. Smeathman relied on assistance from indigenous people in his collections and research, particularly with the examination of termite mounds, but was often reluctant to accept their entomological knowledge. He initially encountered problems with preserving his specimens during oceanic transport, but discovered that placing boxes of specimens atop opened rum barrels effectively prevented their destruction.

=== Marriages ===
On 21 July 1772, Smeathman married his first wife, an African woman who was the daughter of "the King of a Country up the River Sherbro," and at one point may have had three wives simultaneously. Marriage with local women, especially daughters of influential persons, was one of the most significant chances for strangers to settle down. He wrote frankly about his African wives and seemed to view them as a necessary commodity in comparison to his books. Though he wrote about spending very little amounts of money on his wives, he also denounced the slave traders for having too many wives and for treating their wives poorly.

According to John C. Lettsome, Smeathman married first the daughter of King Tom and later the daughter of King James Cleveland; however on both these occasions his spouse died.

=== Departure from Africa ===
Smeathman departed Sierra Leone in 1775 via a slave ship. However, he was delayed in the Caribbean by illness and the American War of Independence while en route to England. Hence, Smeathman supplemented this work with a further four years spent in the Caribbean. Smeathman also sold a number of enslaved Africans in the Caribbean which he purchased in Sierra Leone.

After he returned to England, Smeathman drew up a proposal for the resettlement of the "Black Poor" community in Sierra Leone, which he presented to the Committee for the Relief of the Black Poor and the British government. The plan resulted in the founding of the Sierra Leone Colony and Protectorate in 1787.

Andreas Berlin, one of the apostles of Linnaeus, was among Smeathman's associates.

== Texts ==
- Smeathman, H. (1781) Some Account of the Termites, which are Found in Hot Climates. Phil. Trans. Roy. Soc. 71: 139–192,
- Smeathman, H. (1785?) Elocution and Polite Literature
- Smeathman, H. (1786) Plan of a Settlement to be Made near Sierra Leone, on the Grain Coast of Africa

== Bibliography ==
- Braidwood, Stephen (1994). Black Poor and White Philanthropists: London's Blacks and the Foundation of the Sierra Leone Settlement 1786 - 1791. Liverpool: Liverpool University Press. ISBN 978-0-85323-377-0.
- Coleman, Deirdre (2018). Henry Smeathman, the Flycatcher: Natural History, Slavery, and Empire in the late Eighteenth Century. Liverpool University Press. ISBN 9781786940537.
