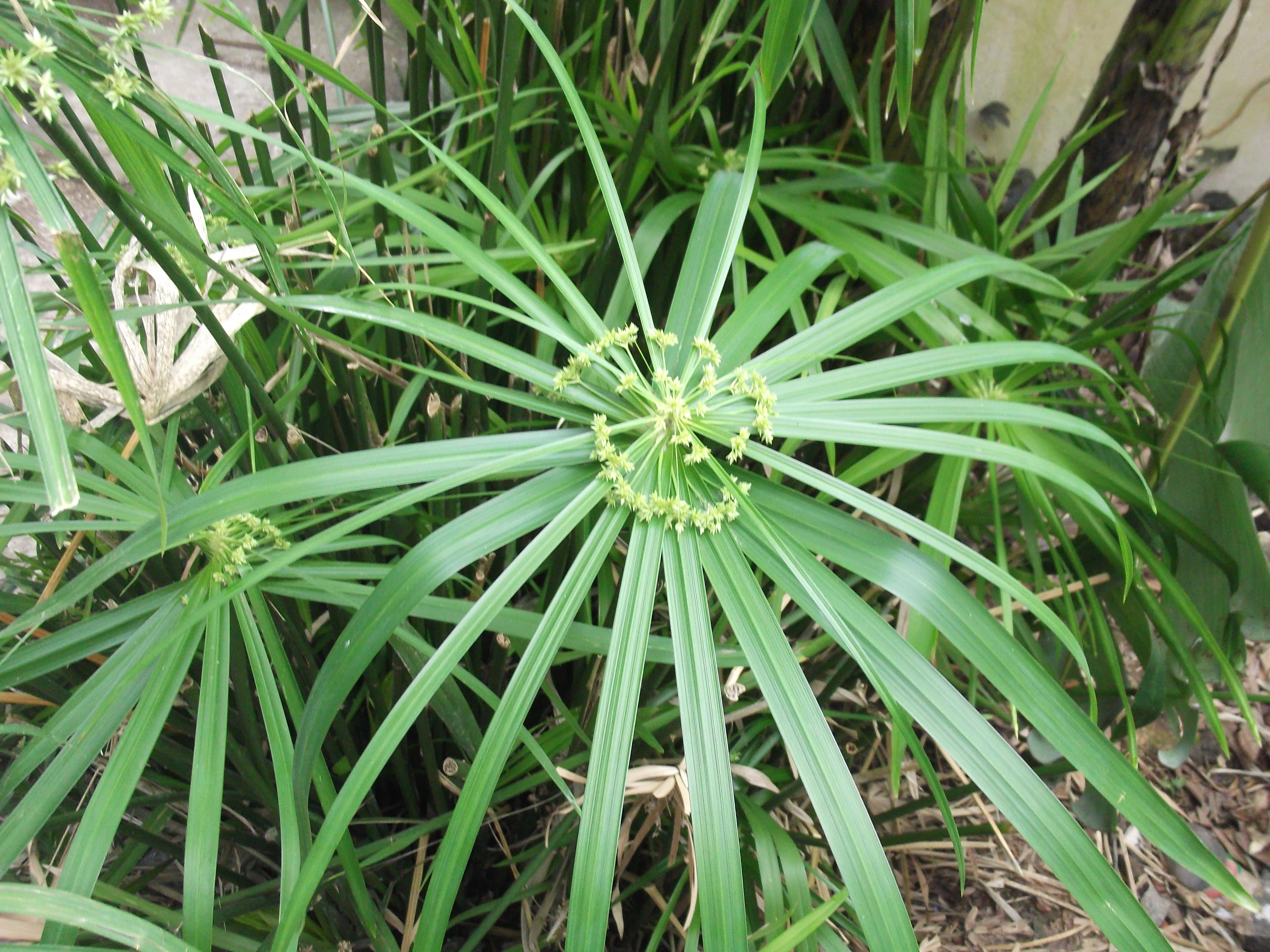

Scientific classification
- Kingdom: Plantae
- Clade: Tracheophytes
- Clade: Angiosperms
- Clade: Monocots
- Clade: Commelinids
- Order: Poales
- Family: Cyperaceae
- Genus: Cyperus
- Species: C. paniceus

Binomial name
- Cyperus paniceus (Rottb.) Boeckeler 1870

= Cyperus paniceus =

Species of sedge

Cyperus paniceus is a species of sedge that is native to parts of Asia.

== See also ==
- List of Cyperus species
