= Cyperus tenuiflorus =

Scaly sedge

Scientific classification
- Kingdom: Plantae
- Clade: Tracheophytes
- Clade: Angiosperms
- Clade: Monocots
- Clade: Commelinids
- Order: Poales
- Family: Cyperaceae
- Genus: Cyperus
- Species: C. tenuiflorus

Binomial name
- Cyperus tenuiflorus Rottb.

Species of plant

Cyperus tenuiflorus is a sedge of the family Cyperaceae, commonly known as scaly sedge.

The rhizomatous perennial herb or grass-like sedge typically grows to a height of 0.9 metres (2.95 ft) and has a tufted habit. It blooms between spring and late summer, October and April in the southern hemisphere, producing green-brown flowers.

It has been introduced into Western Australia it is found in coastal areas around damp areas in the Wheatbelt, Peel and South West regions where it grows in sandy or clay soils.

== See also ==
- List of Cyperus species
