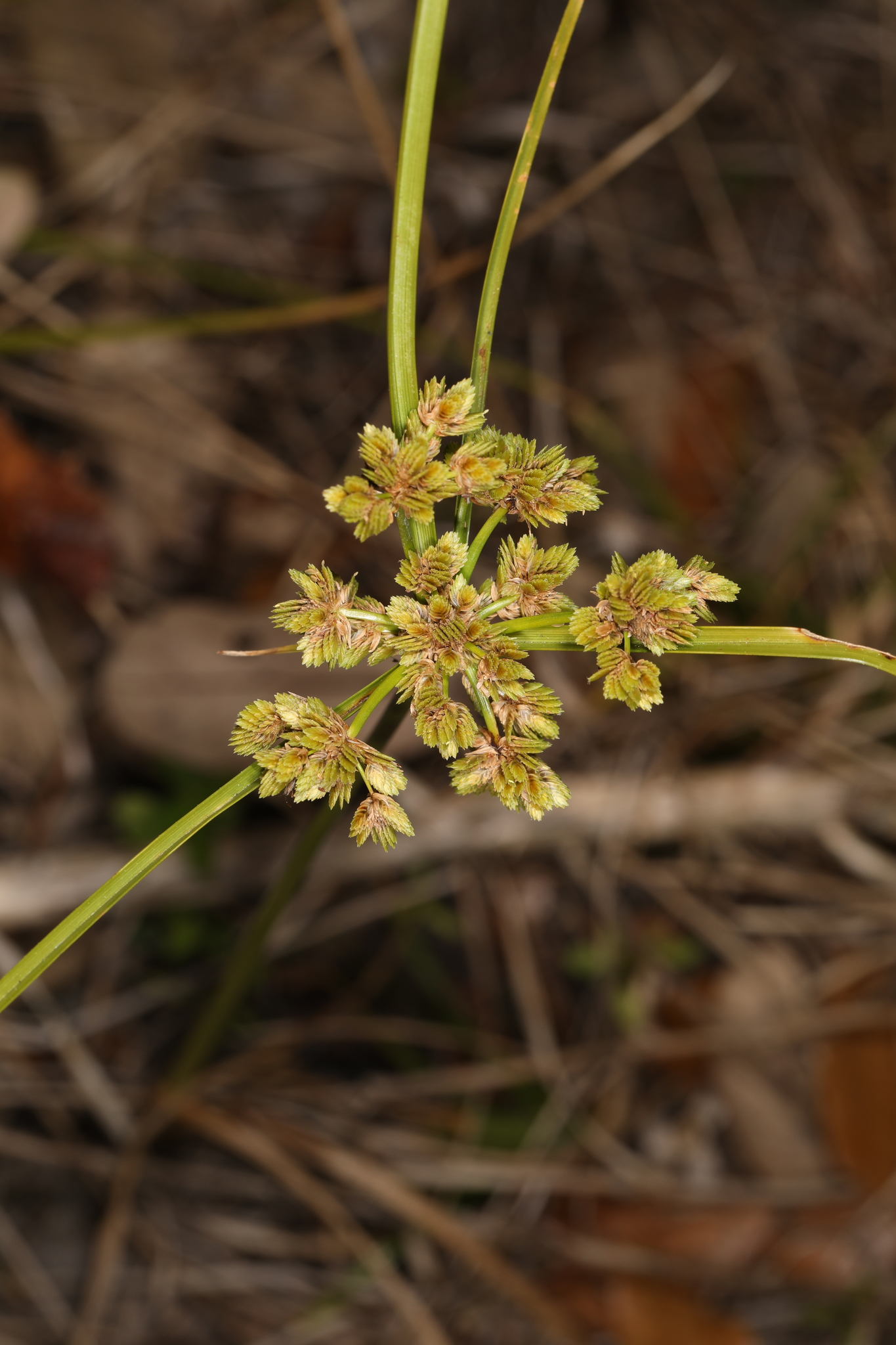

Scientific classification
- Kingdom: Plantae
- Clade: Tracheophytes
- Clade: Angiosperms
- Clade: Monocots
- Clade: Commelinids
- Order: Poales
- Family: Cyperaceae
- Genus: Cyperus
- Species: C. surinamensis

Binomial name
- Cyperus surinamensis Rottb.

= Cyperus surinamensis =

Tropical flatsedge

Species of plant

Cyperus surinamensis, also known as the tropical flatsedge, is a sedge of the family Cyperaceae that is native to the Americas.

== Description ==
The annual or short-lived perennial sedge typically grows to a height of 0.35 to 0.8 metres (1.15 to 2.62 ft). It blooms between late spring and early fall producing reddish-brown flowers.

== Distribution ==
The species is native to the south east of the United States of America, Mexico and parts of Central America. It is an alien species in Western Australia but is found in the Kimberley region.

== Ecology ==
It grows in sunny areas with disturbed soil from sea level to an altitude of 200 metres (656 ft).

== See also ==
- List of Cyperus species
