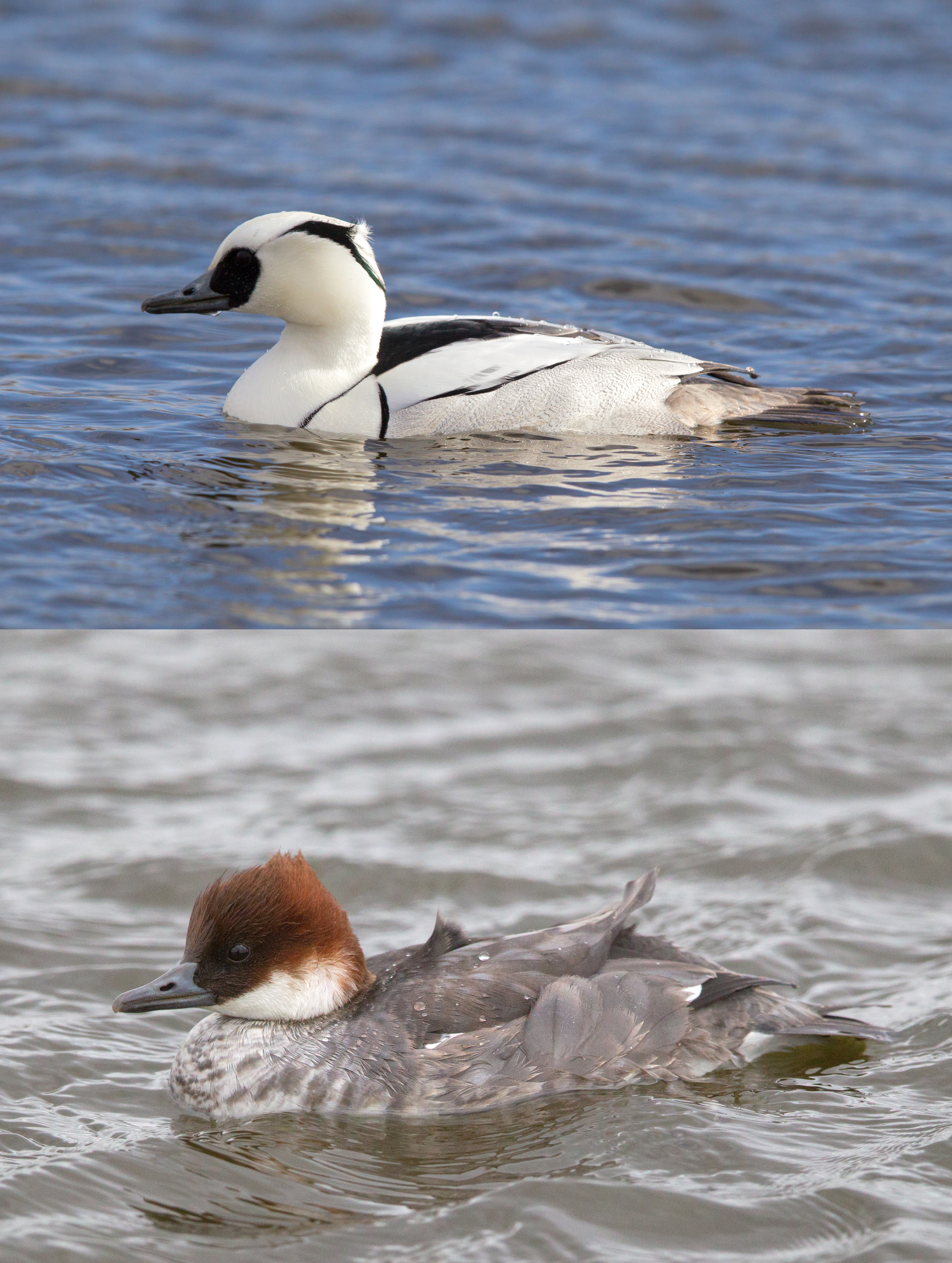
- Male (top) and female smew, Texel, Netherlands

Conservation status
- Least Concern (IUCN 3.1)

Scientific classification
- Kingdom: Animalia
- Phylum: Chordata
- Class: Aves
- Order: Anseriformes
- Family: Anatidae
- Genus: Mergellus
- Species: M. albellus

Binomial name
- Mergellus albellus (Linnaeus, 1758)
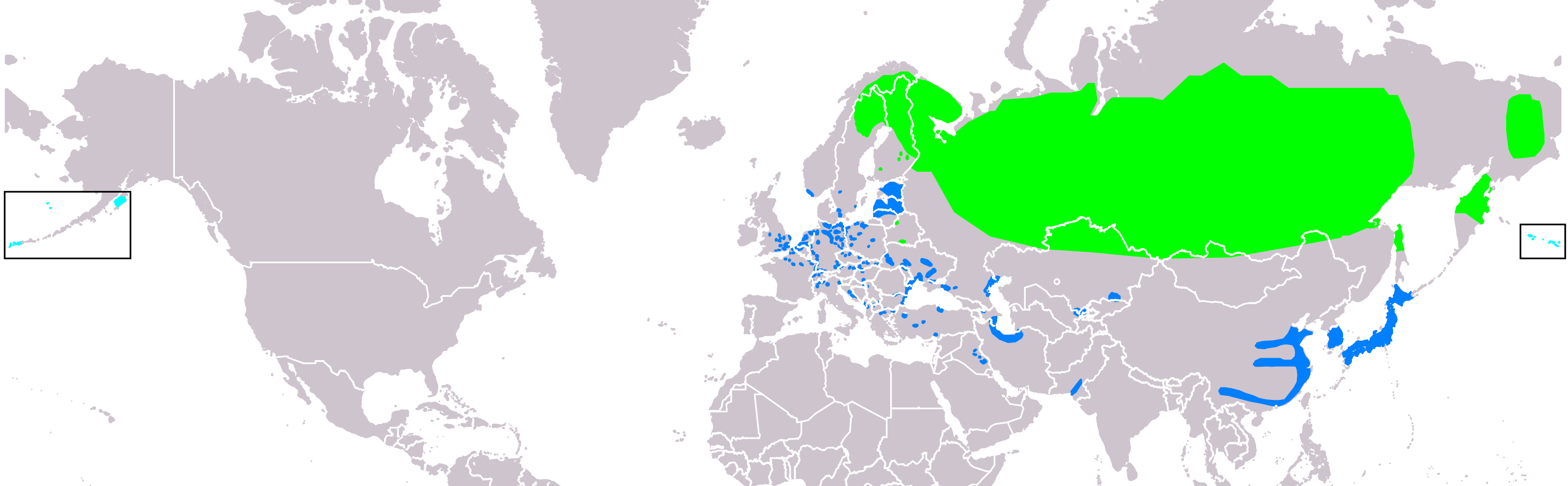
- Range of M. albellus Breeding Non-breeding Passage

Synonyms
- Mergus albellus Linnaeus, 1758; Mergus minutus Linnaeus, 1758

= Smew =

Species of duck

The smew (Mergellus albellus) is a species of duck and is the only living member of the genus Mergellus. The genus is closely related to Mergus and is sometimes included in it; genetic studies have shown that it is the sister taxon to Mergus and Lophodytes. The smew has hybridised with the common goldeneye (Bucephala clangula).

== Taxonomy ==
The smew was formally described in 1758 by the Swedish naturalist Carl Linnaeus in the tenth edition of his Systema Naturae under the binomial name Mergus albellus. Linnaeus based his account on the description published in 1757 by another Swedish naturalist, Fredrik Hasselqvist, who collected one in Smyrna (now İzmir) in Turkey. Linnaeus specified the type locality as Europe but this was restricted to the Mediterranean near İzmir in Turkey on the basis of Hasselqvist's travels. The smew is now the only living species placed in the genus Mergellus that was introduced in 1840 by the English naturalist Prideaux Selby. The species is monotypic, with no subspecies recognised.

=== Etymology ===
The genus name Mergellus is a diminutive of Mergus, a Latin word related to mergo, to dive or submerge, used by Pliny for an unspecified diving bird. The specific epithet albellus is a Latin diminutive of albus meaning "white".

The term smew has been used since the 17th century and is of uncertain origin. It is believed to be related to the Dutch smient ("wigeon") and the German Schmeiente or Schmünte, "wild duck". It is probably derived from smee, a dialectal term for a wild duck.

== Description ==
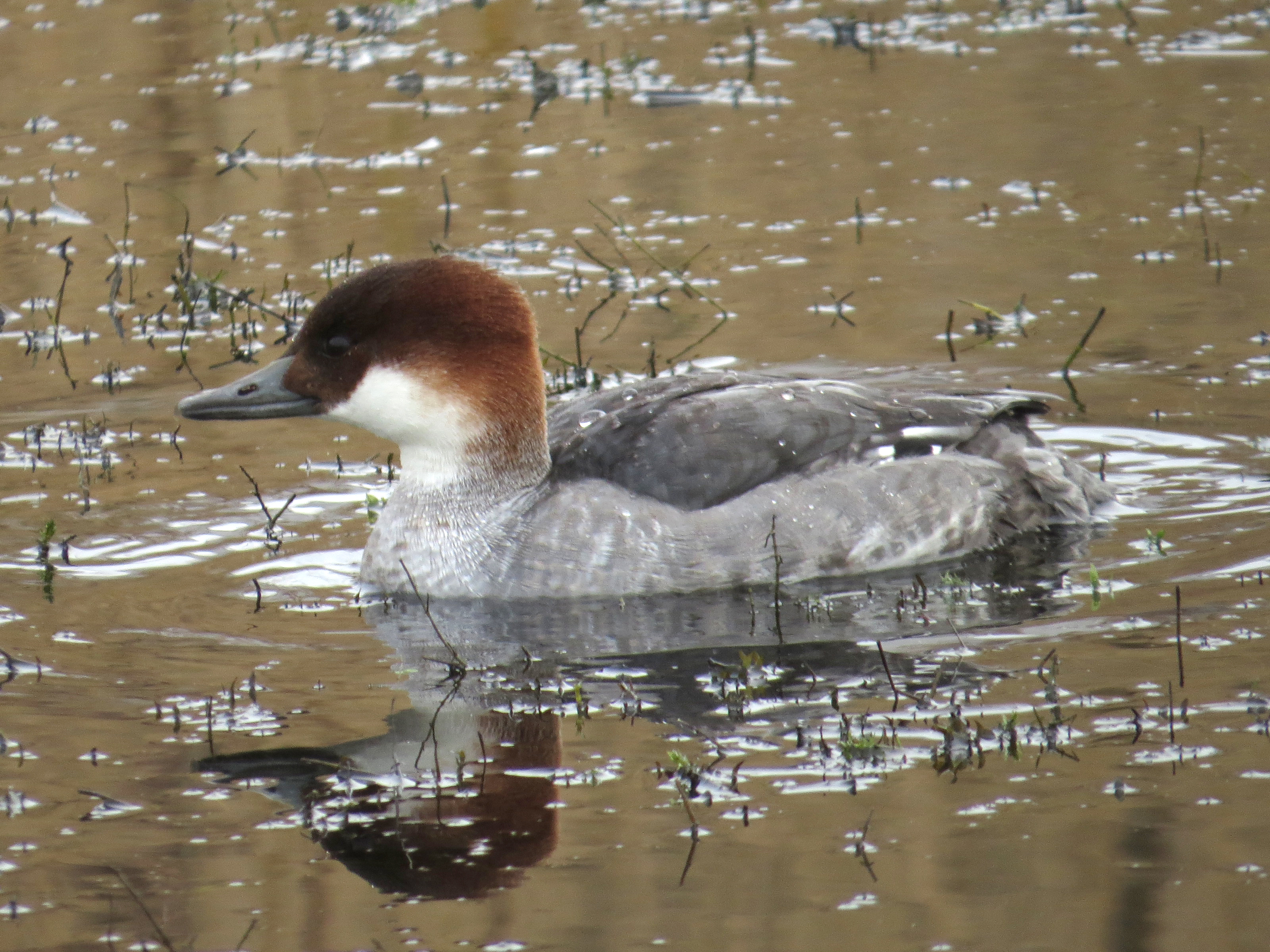
Mergellus albellus female, Northumberland, England

The smew is 38–44 cm (15–17 in) long, with a wingspan of 56–69 cm (22–27 in), and a weight of 450–650 g (16–23 oz).

Adult drake smew, with its 'cracked ice' or 'panda' appearance, is unmistakable, and looks very black-and-white in flight. The females and immature males are grey, with chestnut forehead and crown, white chin and cheeks, and black lores; they are often known as "redhead" smew. Young males moult into adult plumage late in their first winter, when about 8–10 months old; adult males have an eclipse plumage when they become similar to females, but retaining more white in the wing, in late summer and autumn. It has oval white wing-patches in flight. The smew's bill has a hooked tip and serrated edges, which help it catch fish when it dives for them.

== Distribution ==
This species breeds in the Palearctic in the northern taiga from northern Scandinavia east to Chukotka. It needs trees for breeding. The smew lives on fish-rich lakes and slow rivers. As a migrant, it leaves its breeding areas and winters on sheltered coasts or inland lakes; in Europe in the Baltic Sea, the Black Sea, northern Germany, the Low Countries, and Great Britain (mainly in southeast England but some reaching Scotland); in Asia in the Caspian Sea, in eastern China, Korea, and Japan, and a small number reaching northern India. Vagrants have been recorded in northern Africa (Algeria, Egypt) and North America (Alaska, where regular in the Aleutian Islands, and Canada).

== Ecology ==
On lakes it prefers areas around the edges, often under small trees. The smew breeds in May and lays 7–11 cream-coloured eggs, incubated by the female for 26–28 days. Ducklings leave the nest soon after hatching and learn to fly within about 10 weeks.

It nests in tree holes, such as old woodpecker nests. It is a shy bird and flushes easily when disturbed.

The smew is one of the species to which the Agreement on the Conservation of African-Eurasian Migratory Waterbirds (AEWA) applies. It is not considered threatened on the IUCN Red List, though its population is decreasing.

== Fossil history ==
Subfossils from this species have been found in the Early Pleistocene of West Runton, England.

== Gallery ==
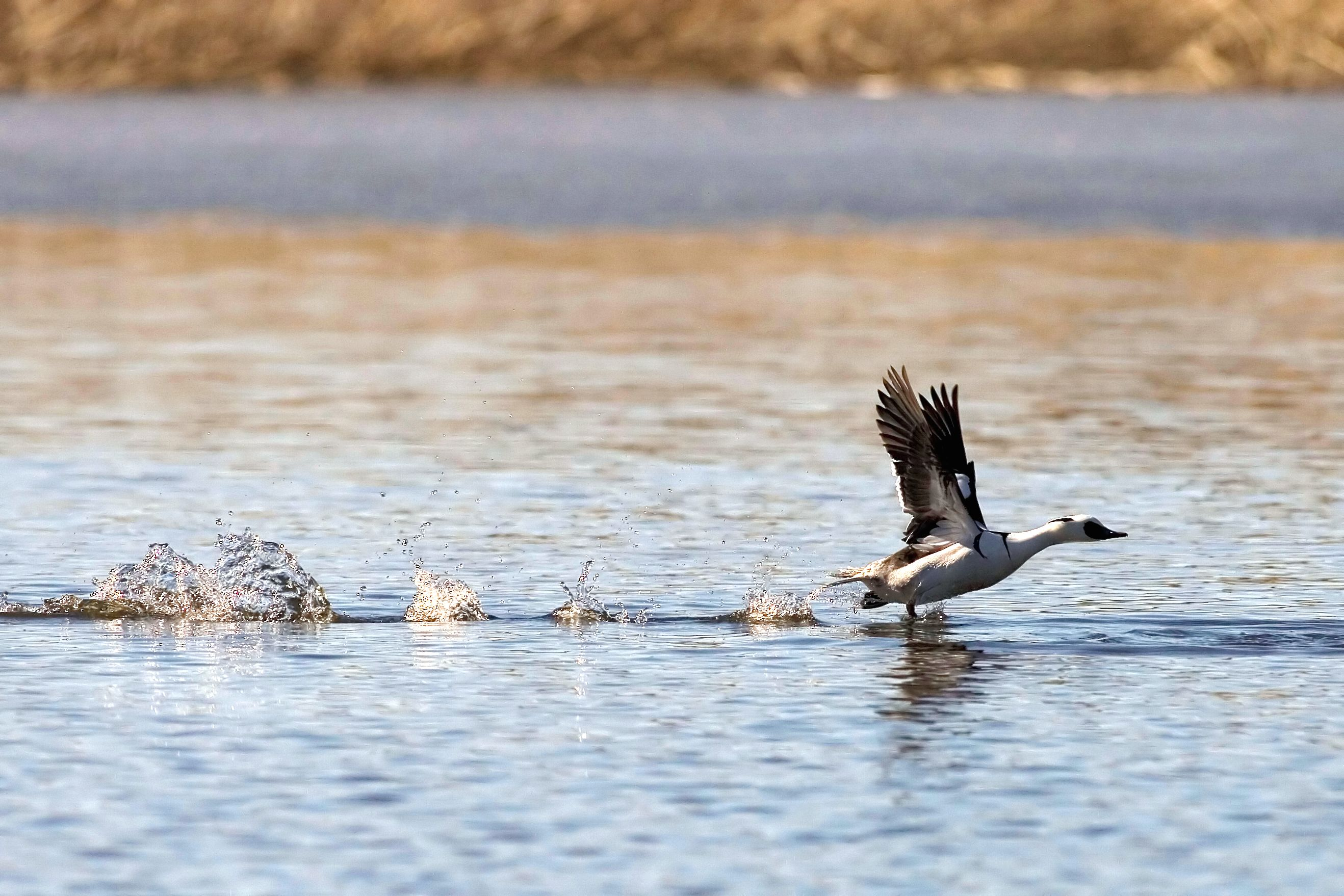
Male taking off, Helsinki, Finland

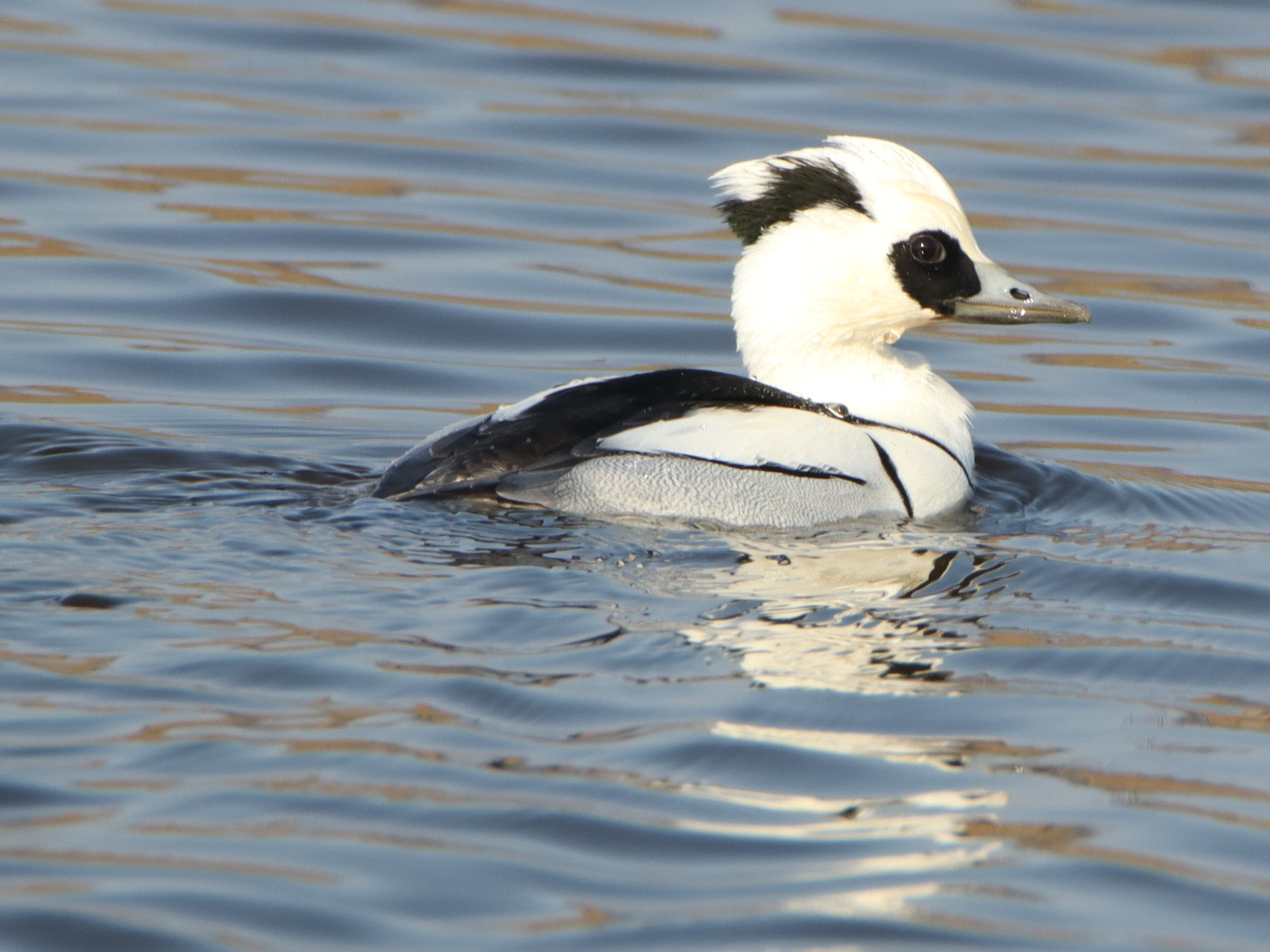
Male, Japan

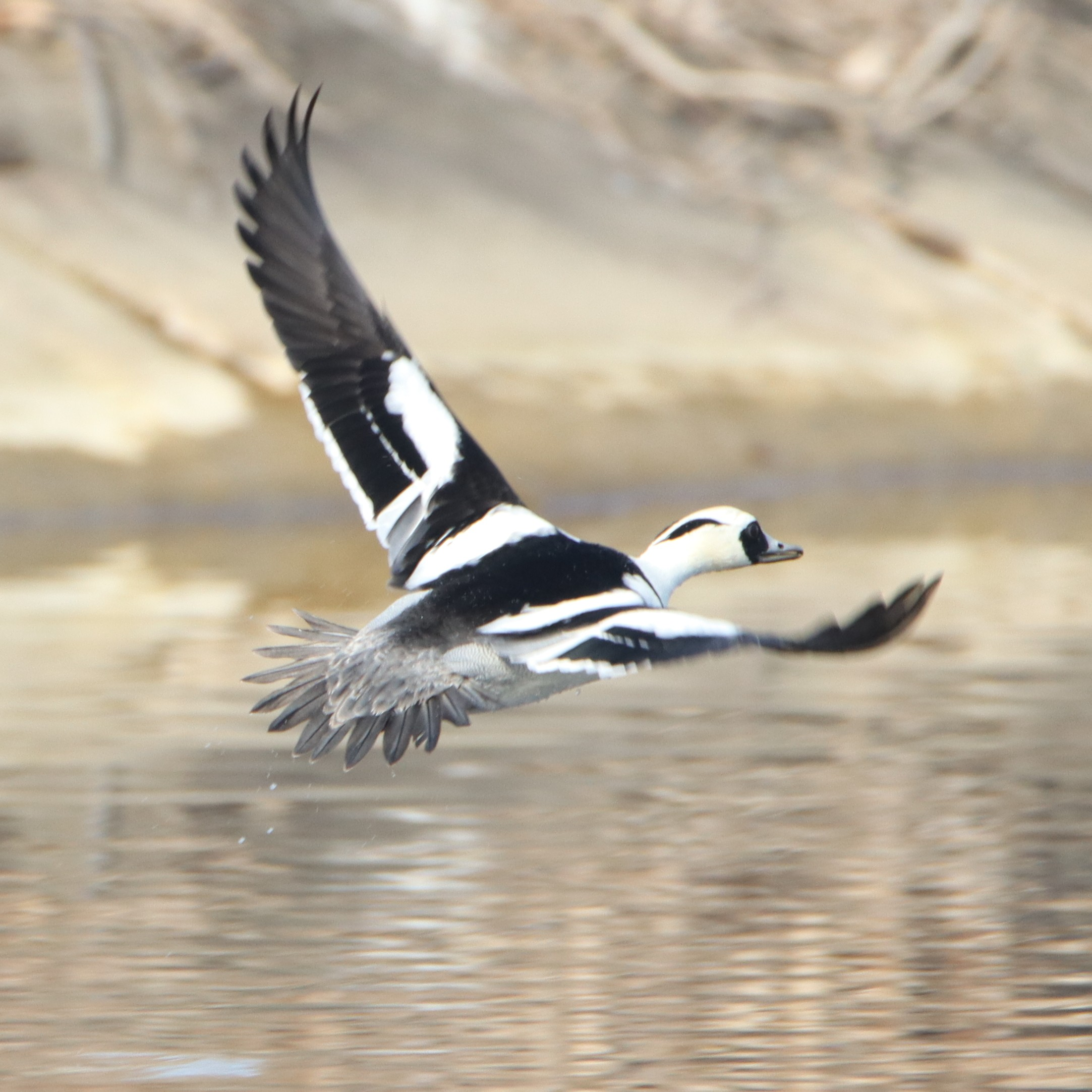
Male in flight, Japan

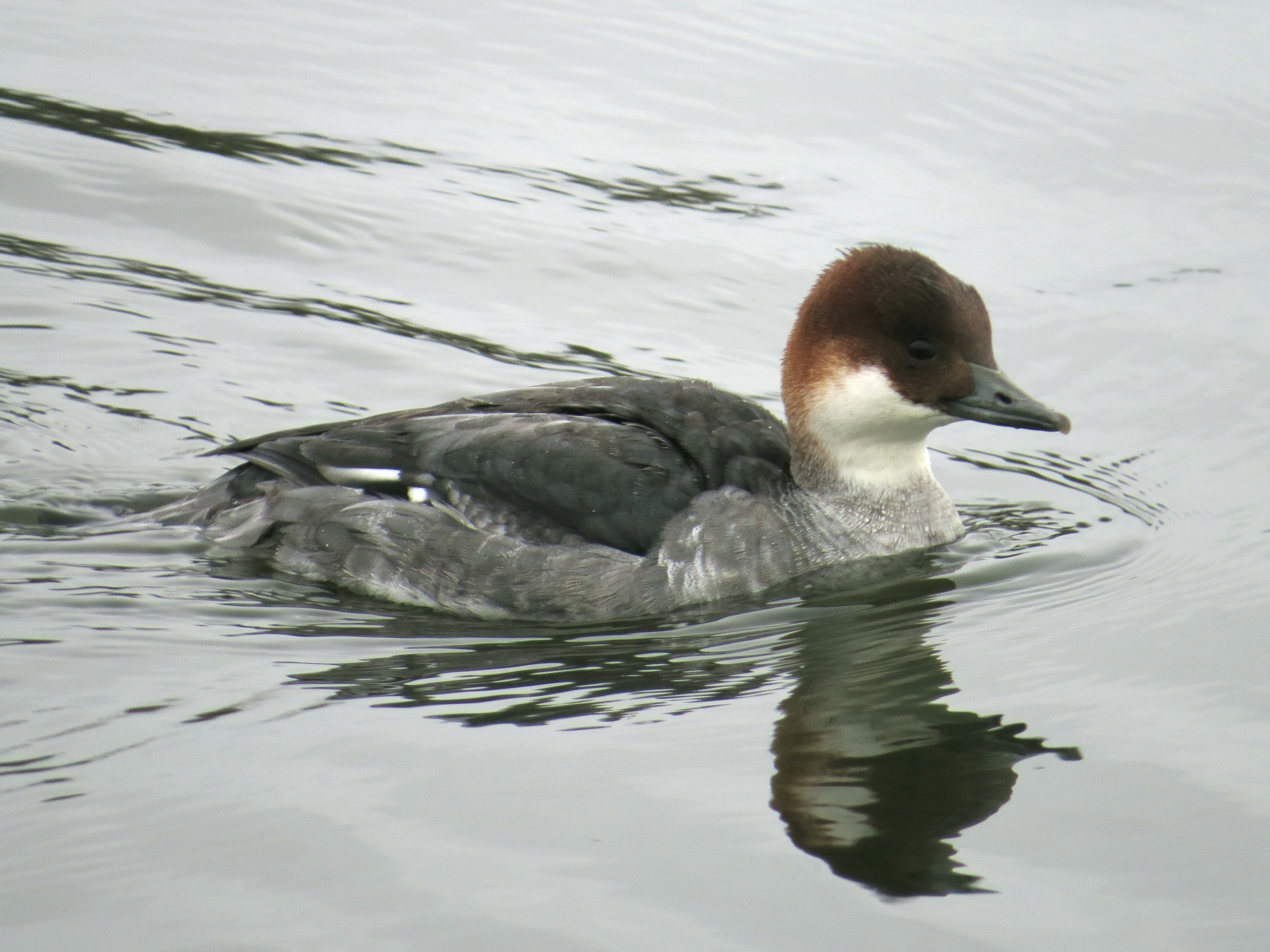
Female, England

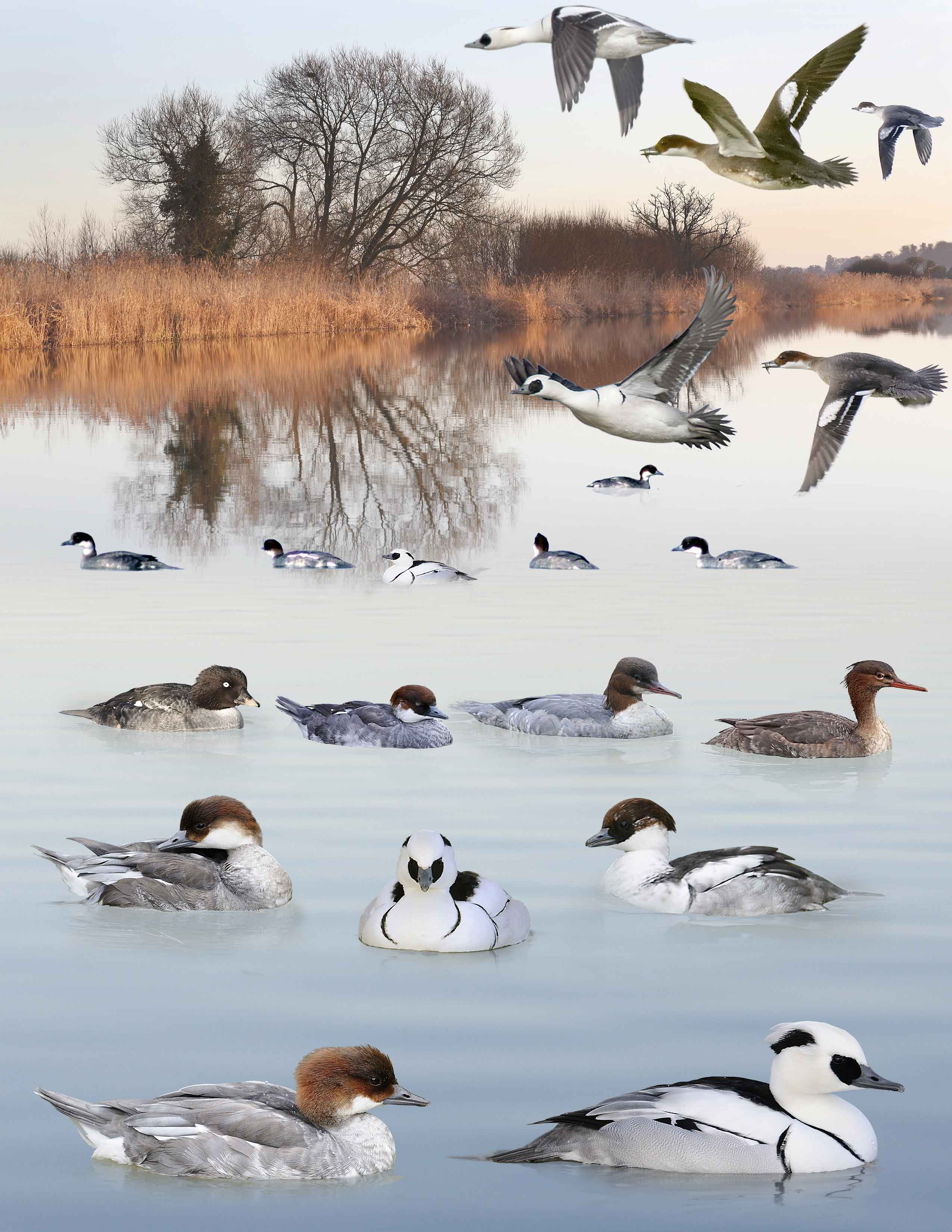
ID composite

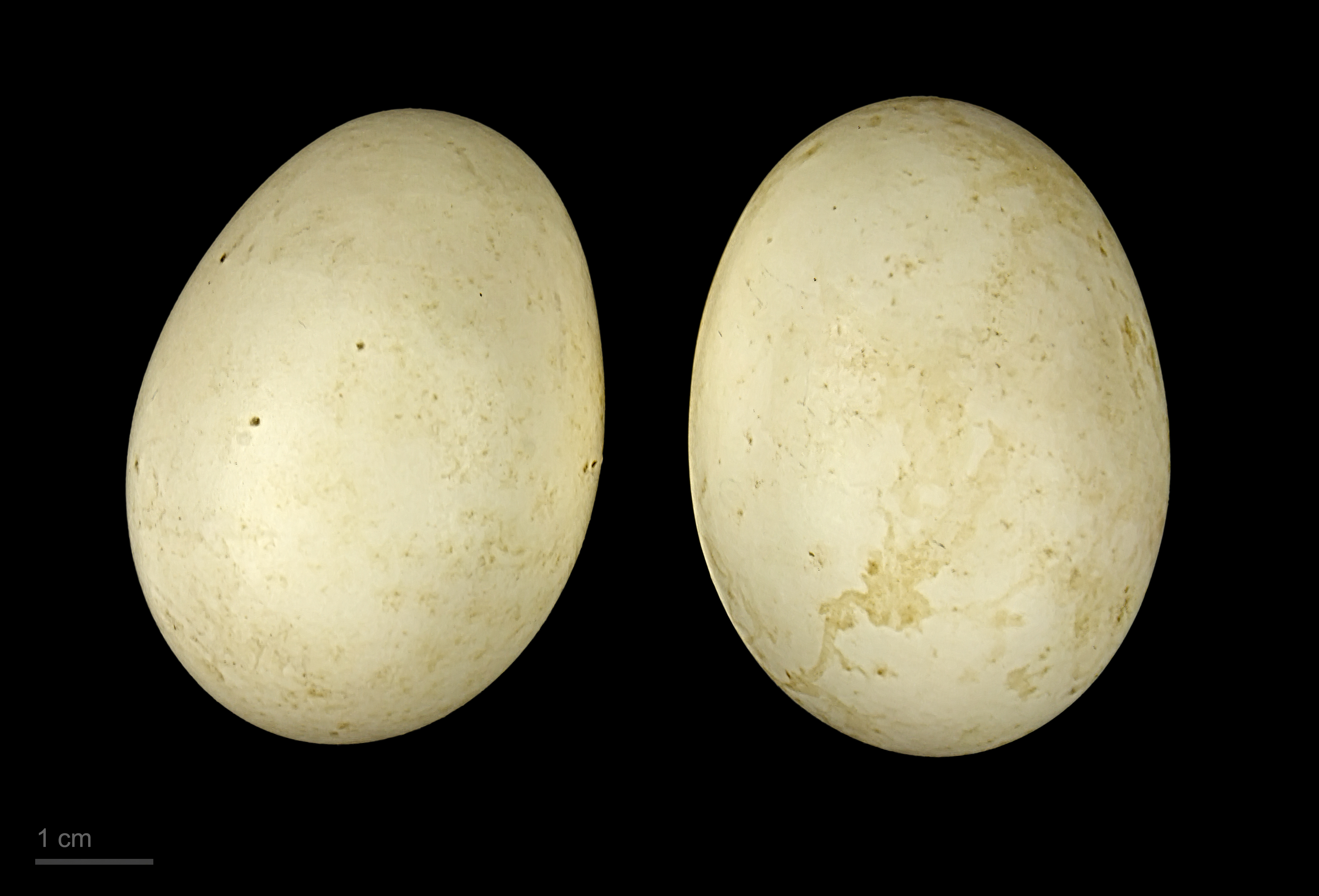
Smew eggs, from Suomussalmi, Finland, at the Muséum de Toulouse
