= Daniel Rolander =

Swedish biologist

Daniel Rolander (1722/3 – 10 August 1793) was a Swedish biologist and an apostle of Carl Linnaeus.

Rolander was born to a simple family in Hälleberga, Småland, Sweden and studied at Uppsala University where he came under the influence of Linnaeus. In 1755, Rolander went to Surinam to study and collect plants, which he sent back to Sweden. He recorded his seven months' activities in his journal, Diarium Surinamicum, quod sub itinere exotico conscripsit Daniel Rolander, tomus I & II, 1754-1756; it was not published until 1811, after Rolander's death. Rolander's work was used by Christen Friis Rottbøll as the basis of botanical publications later in the 18th century.

Rolander also made extensive zoological observations, focusing on insects. While in Surinam, he traveled and collected extensively around Paramaribo at first and then up the Suriname River. Fearing for his health, the naturalist returned to Europe but was unable to return to Sweden until October 1756, nine months after leaving the Americas.

Apparently because of Linnaeus' lack of help in getting home from Germany and his refusal to give his mentor access to the Surinam collections without first being offered an academic post, Rolander and Linnaeus had a severe falling-out. Linnaeus' power and prestige in the academic world made it possible for him to blackball Rolander. Thus, he was unable to gain an academic position and did not publish his findings, gradually drifting into obscurity and poverty due to a misfortune (perhaps the death of a patron he had finally found) and his apparently abrasive personality.

He died in Lund. With his Latin journals now translated and published, his reputation is being rehabilitated.

Rottbøll named the plant genus Rolandra (Asteraceae) after Rolander.

== Sources ==
- Eisner, Thomas, Jayne Yack and Daniel J. Aneshansley 2001 "Acoustic Concomitants of the Defensive Discharges of a Primitive Bombardier beetle (Metrius contractus)," Chemoecology 11(4): 221–223.
- Pain, Stephanie 2007 "The Forgotten Apostle," New Scientist 195 (4 August 2007): 41–45.
