= Adélaïde Victoire Hall =

Swedish-French artist (1772–1844)

Adélaïde "Adéle" Victoire
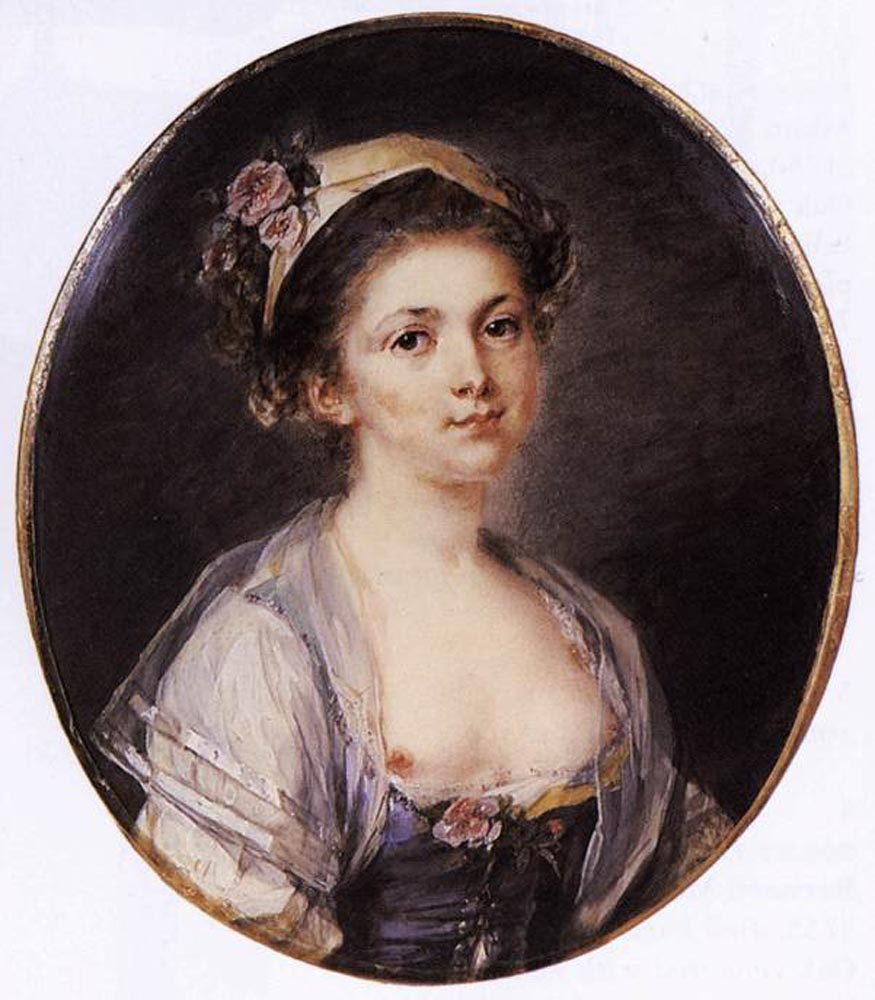
- Adélaïde Victoire Hall by Peter Adolf Hall, 1785, The Wallace Collection, London
- Born: Adélaïde Victoire Hall; 11 April 1772; Paris, France
- Died: 14 October 1844 (aged 72); Paris, France
- Education: Royal Swedish Academy of Arts
- Occupation(s): Painter and nobelwoman
- Spouses: Francois Louis Seleau; Blaise Lievre de la Grange
- Parent(s): Peter Adolf Hall and his wife Marie-Adélaïde Gobin

Adélaïde Victoire Hall, called Adèle (11 May 1772 – 14 October 1844), was a Swedish-French artist and noble (marquise). She was given the honorary title of agré of the Royal Swedish Academy of Arts (1793).

Hall was born in Paris, the daughter of the Swedish artist painter of the royal French court Peter Adolf Hall and his wife Marie-Adélaïde Gobin. She was married in 1792 to the lawyer of the royal council, Francois Louis Seleau, who was murdered during the September Massacres the same year, and to the officer Blaise Lievre de la Grange, marquess de Fourilles in 1796.

Her self-portrait in oil was shown to the Royal Academy of Arts in Stockholm in 1791. She was furthermore represented with her work at the art exhibitions of the academy in 1792 and 1793. She was also a miniaturist and painted on wood and porcelain cups. She died in Paris, aged 72.

Her self-portrait is kept at the Nationalmuseum in Sweden.
