= Mergellus mochanovi =

Mergellus mochanovi Temporal range: Late Pleistocene

Scientific classification
- Kingdom: Animalia
- Phylum: Chordata
- Class: Aves
- Order: Anseriformes
- Family: Anatidae
- Genus: Mergellus
- Species: †M. mochanovi

Binomial name
- †Mergellus mochanovi Zelenkov & Kurochkin, 2014

Extinct species of bird

Mergellus mochanovi is an extinct species of Mergellus that lived in Russia during the Late Pleistocene.
