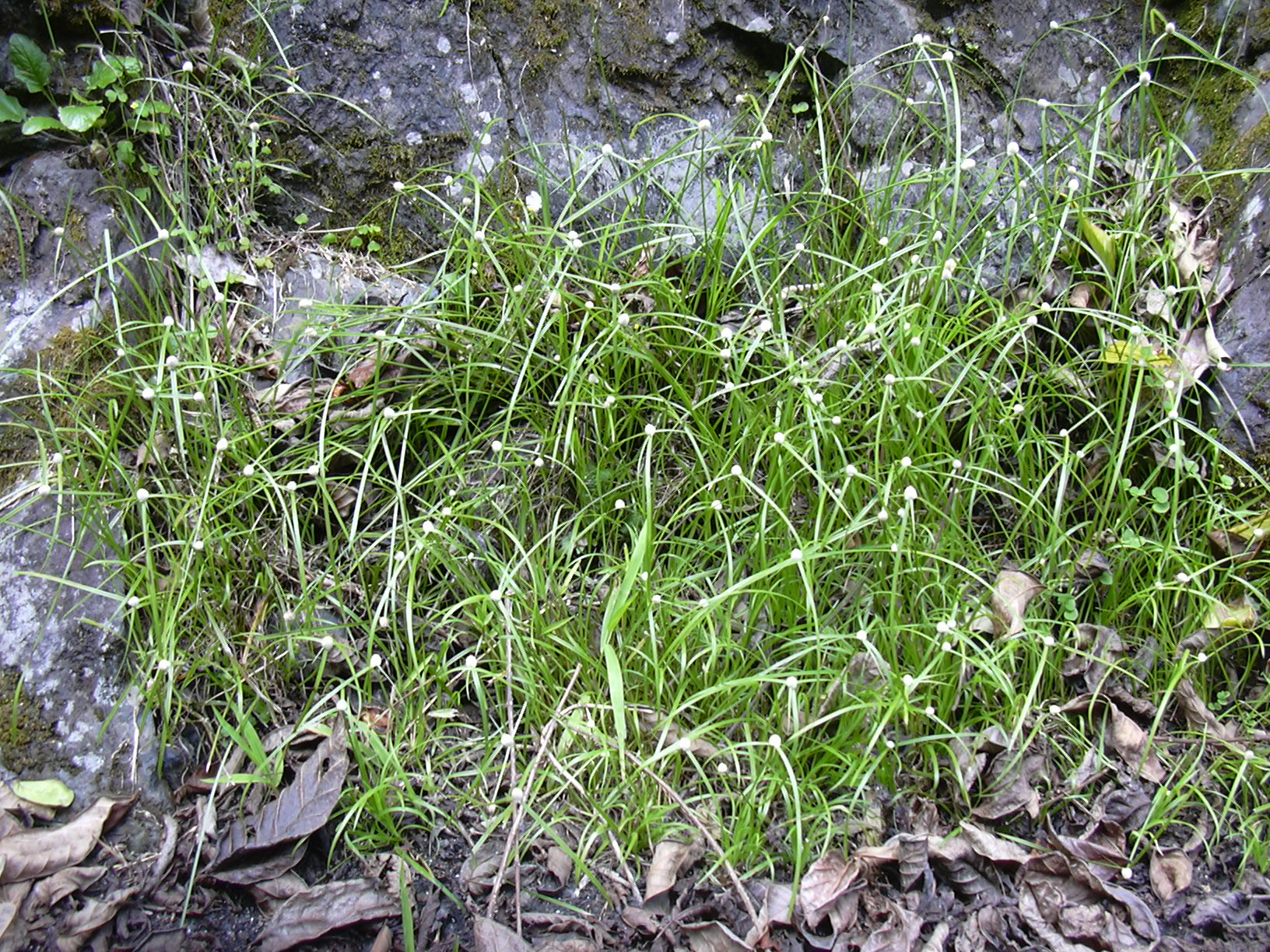
- Kyllinga nemoralis

Scientific classification
- Kingdom: Plantae
- Clade: Tracheophytes
- Clade: Angiosperms
- Clade: Monocots
- Clade: Commelinids
- Order: Poales
- Family: Cyperaceae
- Genus: Kyllinga; Rottb.

Species
- 40-50, see text

Synonyms
- Thryocephalon J.R.Forst. & G.Forst; Killinga T.Lestib.; Hedychloe Raf.; Cyprolepis Steud.; Lyprolepis Steud.

= Kyllinga =

Genus of grass-like plants

Kyllinga is genus of flowering plants in the sedge family known commonly as spikesedges. They are native to tropical and warm temperate areas of the world, especially tropical Africa. These sedges vary in morphology, growing to heights from 2.5 centimeters to a meter and sometimes lacking rhizomes. They are closely related to Cyperus species and sometimes treated as part of a more broadly circumscribed Cyperus.

The genus was named for the 17th century Danish botanist Peder Lauridsen Kylling.

Species include:

- Kyllinga brevifolia
- Kyllinga coriacea
- Kyllinga erecta
- Kyllinga exigua
- Kyllinga gracillima
- Kyllinga melanosperma
- Kyllinga nemoralis
- Kyllinga odorata
- Kyllinga planiculmis
- Kyllinga polyphylla
- Kyllinga pumila
- Kyllinga squamulata
- Kyllinga tibialis
- Kyllinga triceps
- Kyllinga vaginata
