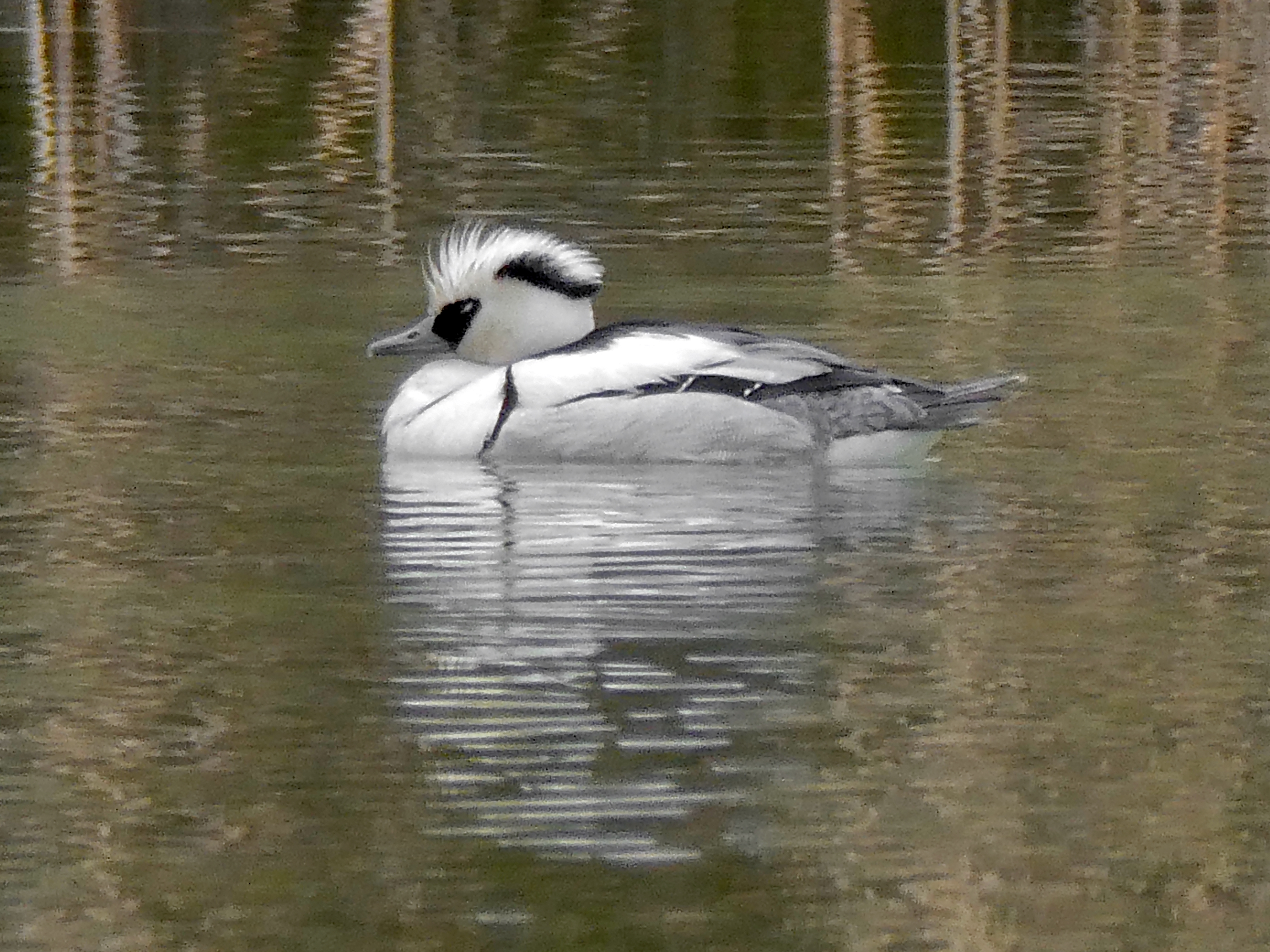
- Smew (Mergellus albellus)

Scientific classification
- Kingdom: Animalia
- Phylum: Chordata
- Class: Aves
- Order: Anseriformes
- Family: Anatidae
- Subfamily: Anatinae
- Genus: Mergellus; Selby, 1840

Species
- Mergellus albellus; †Mergellus mochanovi

= Mergellus =

Genus of duck

Mergellus is a genus of duck. The smew (Mergellus albellus) is the only living species, but an extinct species known as Mergellus mochanovi has also been described from Late Pleistocene deposits in the Yakutia region of Russia.

An unnamed fossil seaduck, known from a humerus found in the Middle Miocene Sajóvölgyi Formation (Late Badenian, 13–12 million years ago) of Hungary was assigned to Mergus. However, the authors included the smew therein, and consequently, the bone is more properly assigned to Mergellus—especially as it was more similar to a smew's than to the Bucephala remains also found at the site. It is sometimes argued that the Mátraszõlõs fossil is too old to represent any of the modern seaduck genera, but apparently these were all well-distinct even back then.
