= Peter Adolf Hall =

Swedish-French artist (1739–1793)

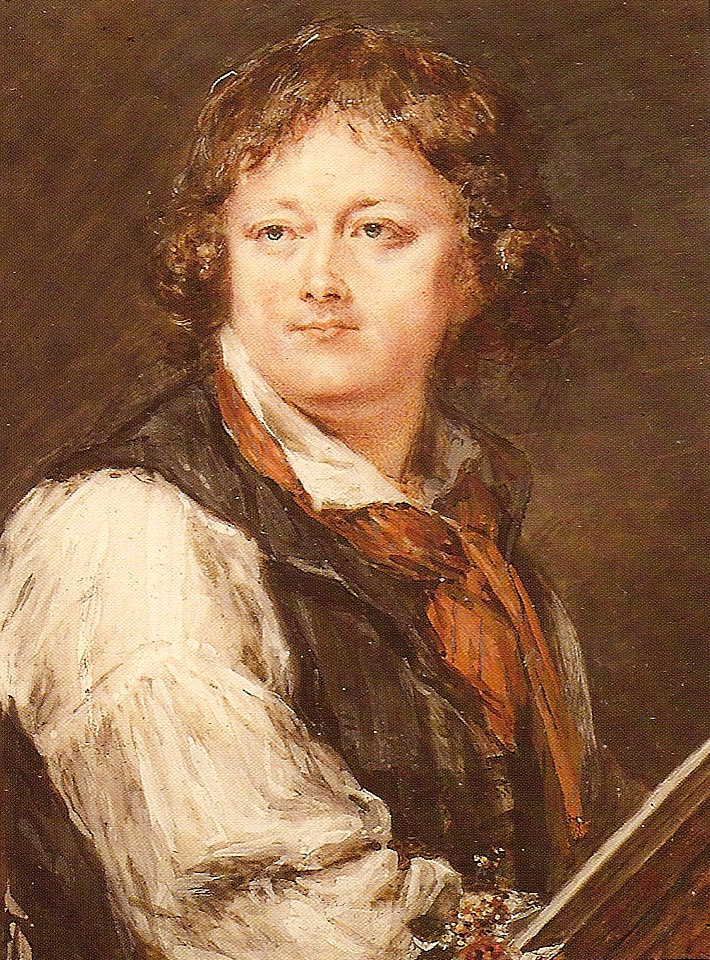
- Selfportrait, before 1793
- Born: Peter Adolf Hall; 23 February 1739; Borås, Sweden
- Died: 15 May 1793 (aged 54); Belgium
- Education: Uppsala University
- Occupation: Painter
- Spouse: Marie Adelaïde Gobin
- Parent(s): Petter Börjesson Hall and Eva Margareta
- Relatives: Pehr Wilhelm Wargentin, (once removed cousin); Birger Martin (brother); Adélaïde Victoire Hall, Angélique Lucie Hall, Adolphine Mélanie Isabelle Hall and Hippolyte Adolphe Hall (1780-1833).

Peter Adolf Hall, also known as PA Hall or Peter Adolphe Hall, (23 February 1739 in Borås – 15 May 1793 in Liège), was a Swedish-French artist who mainly devoted himself to miniature painting.

== Early life ==
Hall was born to a merchant and magistrate in Borås, who was also a Member of Parliament, Petter Börjesson Hall (1707-1776) and Eva Margareta. Eva was an older cousin of the astronomer Pehr Wilhelm Wargentin. Together with his younger brother Birger Martin, Hall studied medicine and 'natural history' between 1753-55 at Uppsala University's medical faculty where Carl Linnaeus taught. In the following years, 1755–59, the brothers went on a period-style educational journey in Europe under the guidance of a teacher, Mr. Lars Brisman. In Berlin and Hamburg, Peter Adolf acquainted himself both with playing music and took a liking to the visual arts. To his father's chagrin, he started working in enamel and miniature painting instead of becoming a doctor.

== Career ==
In May 1766 Hall began to work as an artist in Paris. Three years later, at the age of 30, he was elected to the French Academy of Fine Arts. He painted portraits of the Dauphin of France, the prospective Louis XVI, as of his two brothers, who also would ascend the throne eventually, after the Revolution and the Napoleonic period, namely, Louis XVIII and Charles X. Peter Adolf Hall was then appointed a court painter or Peintre du Roi et des Enfants de France. According to an account book kept by his wife, between the years 1782-87 Hall painted an average of 70 portraits a year, of nobilities in general and people from the fashionable society. His annual income was around 25,000 livres.

== Family ==
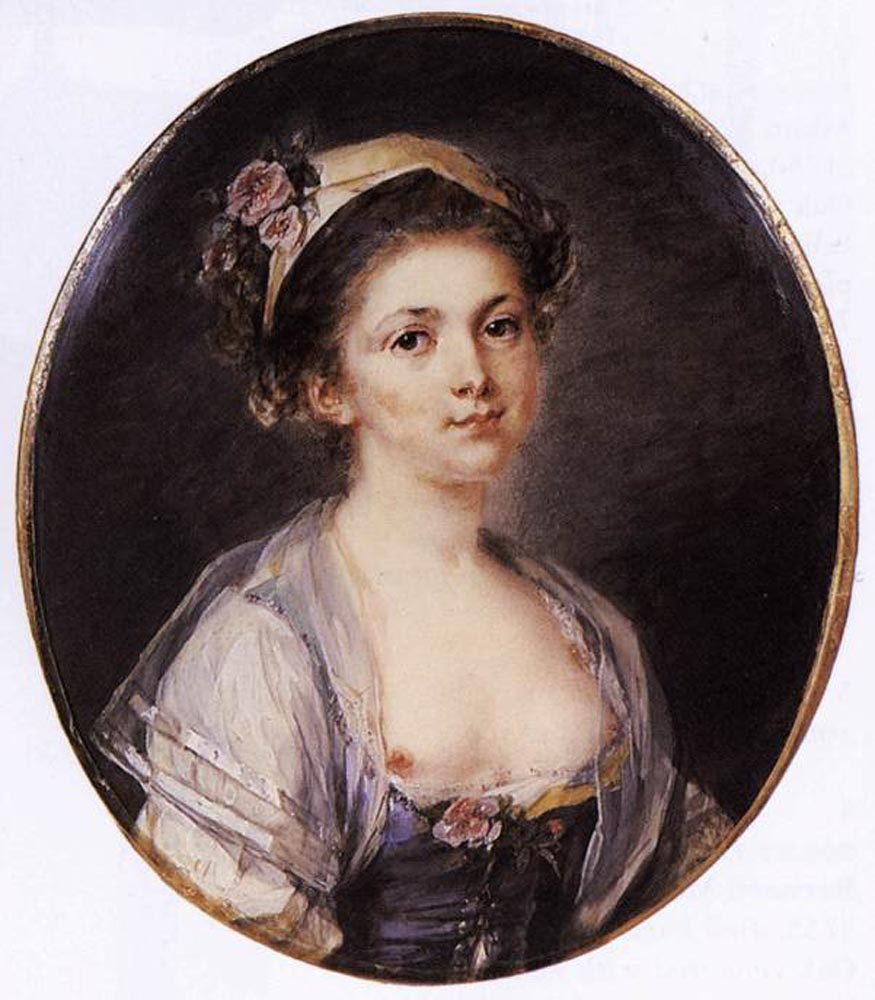
Adélaïde Victoire Hall by Peter Adolf Hall, 1785, The Wallace Collection, London

On 23 April 1771 he married a merchant's daughter, Marie Adelaïde Gobin (1752-1832), in the newly built parish church of Saint-Louis at Versailles. They would in time have three daughters and a son. He encouraged his eldest daughter Adélaïde Victoire Hall's talent for visual arts, and played the flute with his second daughter, the musical Angélique Lucie Hall (1774-1819) who played the piano. His third daughter was named Adolphine Mélanie Isabelle Hall (1777-1852) and the fourth child was the son Gabriel Hippolyte Adolphe Hall (1780-1833).

== Exile ==
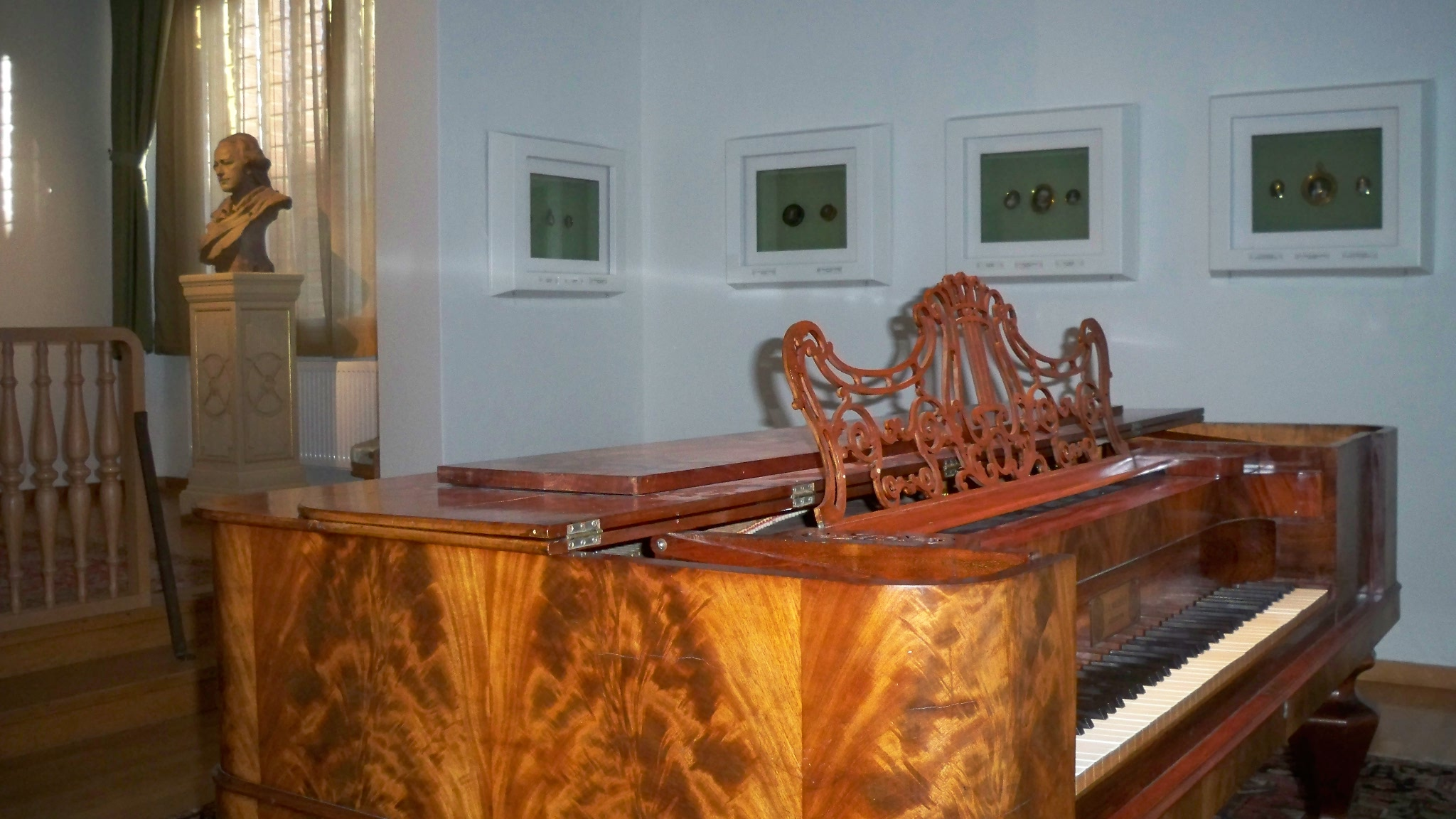
Peter Adolf Hall's 18th century room. The piano represents a central part of the artistic Hall family life as one of the daughters was playing it, often together with her father on flute. Some of his miniature works are framed on the wall, Borås Art Museum

Peter Adolf Hall was a strong supporter of Jean-Jacques Rousseau's ideology. Among those who visited his home on the Rue du Petit-Reposoir in Paris were not only the art world participants and patrons but also the Marquis of Lafayette. Hall was present at the Storming of the Bastille as a revolutionary officer. In 1791 he went into exile though and never reunited with his family in Paris ever again. His wife's inherited wealth was confiscated by the nation and a son-in-law married to the painter's first-born was torn to pieces by a mob six weeks after their wedding. Hall supported his family from abroad as best as he could, but died in Belgium a few years later.
