= Peder Lauridsen Kylling =

Danish botanist

Peder Lauridsen Kylling (c. 1640 – 1696) was a 17th-century Danish botanist.

== Biography ==
He was born in Assens and began studies at the University of Copenhagen in 1660. He graduated in theology in 1666 and was called as parish minister. However, for reasons now unknown, the call was withdrawn shortly afterward. Kylling then engaged in studies of botany.

His best known work is the Viridarium Danicum ("Danish Garden"), published in 1688. This work contains an alphabetic list of plant species and their places of occurrence in the crown lands of the Danish king, mainly from Zealand, but also from Jutland and Slesvig. More than 1,100 plant species were mentioned in the book. Some of the entries in the Viridarium Danicum are known to have been contributed by Henrik Gerner who was then the priest in Birkerød. The species list was later critically reviewed by M. T. Lange. Kylling is known to have worked on an enlarged edition, which however was never published. According to some sources, that manuscript was found in the library of Albrecht von Haller.

The plant genus Kyllinga (Cyperaceae) was named in his honour by botanist Christen Friis Rottbøll.

== Citation ==
- Bricka, C F in Projekt Runeberg, Dansk Biografisk Lexikon. Vol 5 Page 609 - Henrik Gerner
