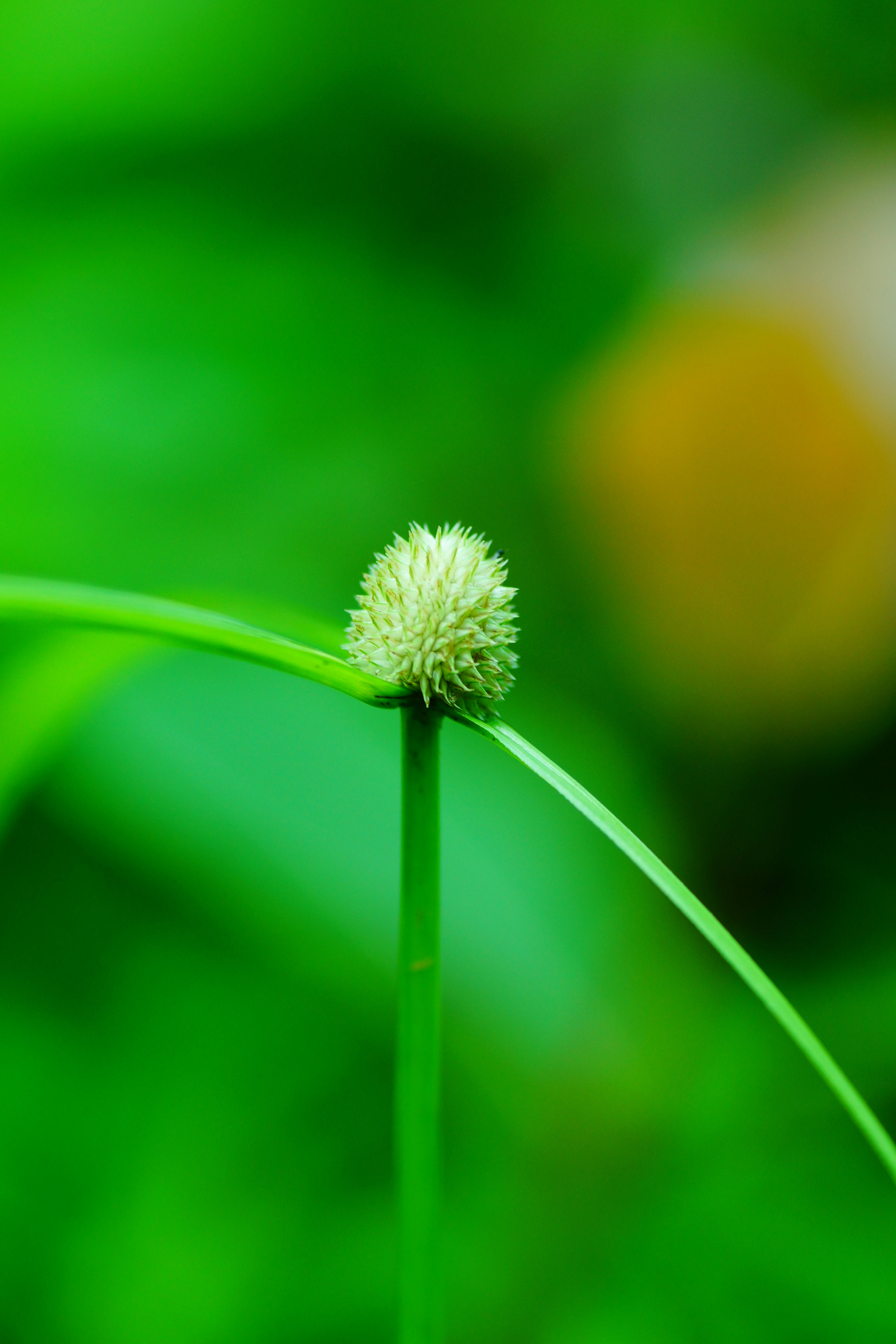

Scientific classification
- Kingdom: Plantae
- Clade: Tracheophytes
- Clade: Angiosperms
- Clade: Monocots
- Clade: Commelinids
- Order: Poales
- Family: Cyperaceae
- Genus: Kyllinga
- Species: K. nemoralis

Binomial name
- Kyllinga nemoralis (J.R.Forst. & G.Forst.) Dandy ex Hutch. & Dalziel

= Kyllinga nemoralis =

Species of grass-like plant

Kyllinga nemoralis, the white water sedge or whitehead spikesedge, is a plant species in the sedge family, Cyperaceae. It is found in shaded meadows, rock crevices and road sides.

== Description ==
Kyllinga nemoralis is a perennial creeping sedge spreading by means of a long-creeping rhizome, found in shaded meadows, rock crevices and road sides. Stems erect, up to 55 cm in height, 3-angled; single flower.
