= Apostles of Linnaeus =

Students on the expeditions of Linnaeus

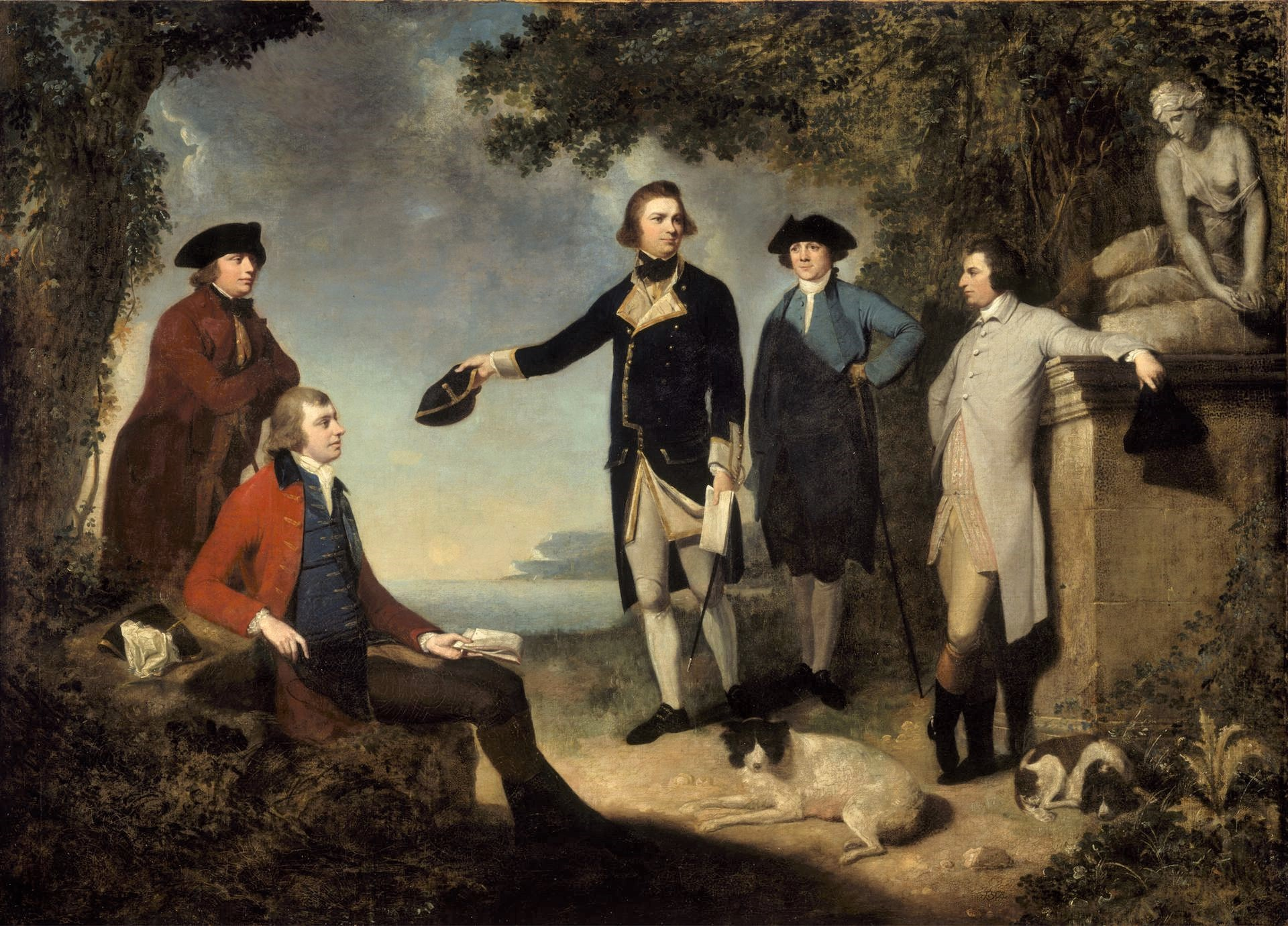
Apostle Daniel Solander (far left) with Joseph Banks (left, sitting) accompanied James Cook (centre) on his journey to Australia. Portrait by John Hamilton Mortimer.

The Apostles of Linnaeus were a group of students who carried out botanical and zoological expeditions throughout the world that were either devised or approved by botanist Carl Linnaeus. The expeditions took place during the latter half of the 18th century and the students were designated 'apostles' by Linnaeus.

Many apostles began their journey from Sweden. Some would act as chaplains or doctors aboard a Swedish East India Company ship. The expeditions were often dangerous. Seven of the seventeen apostles never came home. The first apostle, Christopher Tärnström, died of a tropical fever on Côn Sơn Island in 1746. Tärnström's widow was angry with Linnaeus for making her children fatherless. After this incident, Linnaeus sent only unmarried men.

Linnaeus remained involved in most expeditions. He often left notes for the apostles and outlined what they should look for during their journeys, and the apostles sent letters and botanical samples to Linnaeus. Upon their return, it was usual to give Linnaeus a selection of anything collected. However, Daniel Rolander elected not to transfer his collection and was criticised by Linnaeus.

Many newly discovered plants, animals and insects were named and catalogued by Linnaeus and apostles. As a result, the apostles' expeditions helped spread the Linnaean taxonomy, a system for classifying organisms. Additionally, one of Linnaeus' admirers, the English botanist Joseph Banks, was inspired to begin the tradition for all British research ships to have a naturalist aboard. Thus the apostles had a direct influence on future expeditions such as Charles Darwin's expedition aboard HMS Beagle.

== Origins ==
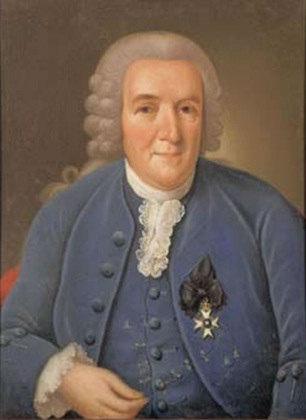
Carl Linnaeus

Carl Linnaeus was born in Råshult, Småland, Sweden on 23 May 1707. Linnaeus enrolled at Uppsala University to study botany and medicine in 1728. Following his studies, he went to the Netherlands to study medicine. While in the Netherlands, he published Systema Naturae that describes a new system for classifying plants.

Linnaeus returned to Sweden in May 1741 and was appointed Professor of Medicine at Uppsala University. Nine years later he became the university's rector, starting a period where natural sciences were held in the greatest esteem.

One contribution Linnaeus made during his time in Uppsala was as a teacher. His lectures were normally full and often held in the Botanical Garden. The Saturday botanical excursions during summer were more popular than his lectures. Linnaeus and students explored the flora and fauna in the vicinity of Uppsala. Additionally, he let some of the best students live with him at his house.

Among Linnaeus' notable students, the most promising and committed ones made botanical expeditions to various places in the world, often with the help of their professor. These seventeen adventurers were referred to as Linnaeus' apostles. The amount of this help varied; sometimes he used his influence as Rector to grant his apostles a place on an expedition or a scholarship. Most apostles were given instructions of what to find during their journeys. The apostles collected, organised and classified new plants, animals and minerals according to Linnaeus' classification system. Most gave their collections to Linnaeus when their journey finished.

== The Apostles ==
=== Christopher Tärnström, China (1746) ===
Christopher Tärnström (1703–1746) was the first apostle. Linnaeus permitted Tärnström to conduct a botanical expedition in China. In early 1746, Tärnström received free passage on the Swedish East India Company ship Calmar to China. He took a list, written by Linnaeus, of things to collect which included plants, animals and insects. However, Calmar stopped sailing beyond Côn Sơn Island (off the modern-day Vietnamese coast) because it had been forced to find a winter berth. On 4 December 1746, Tärnström died of a tropical fever without a botanical or zoological specimen having been sent to Sweden. His widow blamed Linnaeus for making her children fatherless. Following the death of Tärnström, Linnaeus allowed only unmarried men to become his apostles.

=== Pehr Kalm, North America (1747–1751) ===
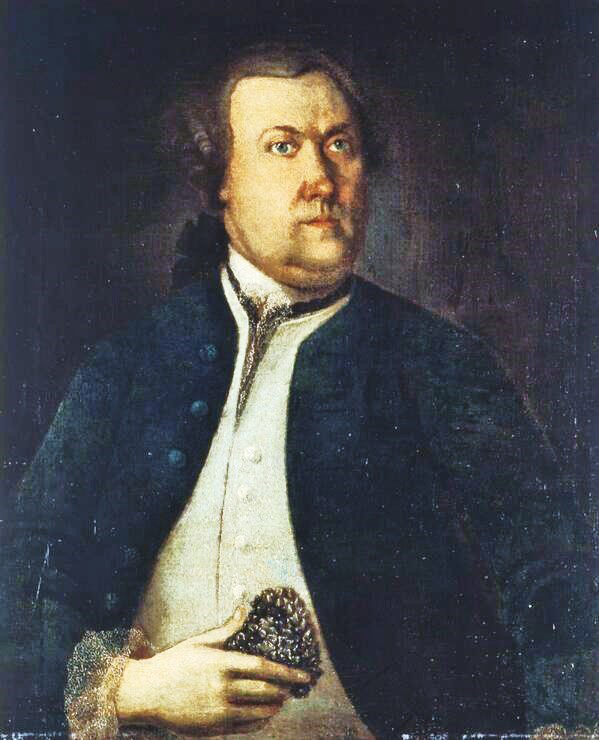
Pehr Kalm

Pehr Kalm (1715–1779) was born in Sweden to Finnish parents and became a student of Linnaeus in December 1740. He proposed to Linnaeus that he travel to North America on a botanical expedition. Linnaeus concurred and in November 1747 Kalm began his journey to North America sponsored by the universities in Uppsala and Turku. After a long stay in England, on the way he reached Philadelphia in autumn 1748. Once there, he stayed in North America for two and a half years, visiting the states of Pennsylvania, New Jersey, New York and southern Canada. He then returned to Sweden. Kalm is one of the few apostles who actually lived up to Linnaeus' hopes; bringing with him a large collection of pressed plants and seeds. His travel experience was later published in a three-volume book, En resa til Norra America.

=== Fredric Hasselquist, Izmir, Egypt etc. (1749–1752) ===
Fredric Hasselquist (1722–1752) heard Linnaeus talking about the botanically unexplored Eastern Mediterranean and he was inspired to travel there. Hasselquist was poor and to make the expedition possible, he relied on sponsorships from Linnaeus and Olof Celsius. On 7 August 1749, Hasselquist sailed from Stockholm to Izmir (a city in Turkey) where he spent the winter. Subsequently, he sailed to Egypt where stayed for ten months before returning. On the way he passed: Syria; Cyprus; Rhodes; and Chios. He returned to Izmir with a rich collection of botanical and zoological findings and also minerals. On 9 February 1752, he died before returning to Sweden. During his expedition he accumulated a large debt and Linnaeus was informed that Hasselquist's collections and manuscripts would not be sent home until the debt was paid. Swedish Queen Louisa Ulrika paid the debt and Linnaeus received Hasselquist's findings. In 1757, Linnaeus published Iter Palaestinium based on Hasselquist's collections and manuscripts.

=== Olof Torén, Surat and Guangzhou (1750) ===
Olof Torén (1718–1753) travelled to Surat and India as a priest with the Swedish East India Company in 1750. He continued to Guangzhou (Canton) and China before returning to Sweden. During his journey, he corresponded with Linnaeus; these letters were published posthumously as an appendix in the travelogue of another apostle, Pehr Osbeck. He fell ill during his journey and died shortly after his return in 1753. He returned with a large collection of specimens.

=== Pehr Osbeck, China (1750–1752) ===
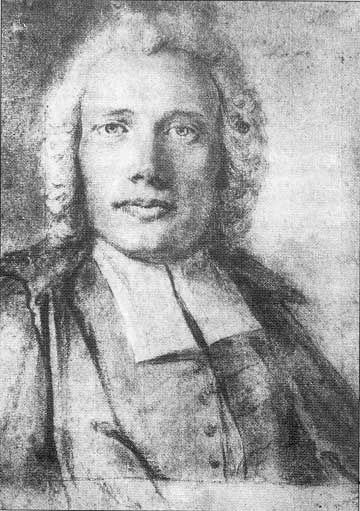
Pehr Osbeck

Pehr Osbeck (1723–1805) sailed from Gothenburg to China in 1750 on ship Prins Carl. His primary task was to collect a tea plant for Linnaeus. He spent four months in Guangzhou where he collected many plants, but not the tea plant. He returned to Sweden in June 1752 with his collection and several other objects which he gave to Linnaeus.

=== Pehr Löfling, Spain and Venezuela (1751–1756) ===
Pehr Löfling (1729–1756) was recommended by Linnaeus when the Spanish ambassador in Stockholm asked for help exploring Spanish flora. Löfling travelled to Madrid in 1751 where he stayed for approximately two years. He explored the flora and fauna and regularly sent plants to Linnaeus. In 1754 the Spanish organised an expedition to South America and Löfling was invited to join them. They first stopped in the Canary Islands, staying for a short time before continuing to Venezuela. In Venezuela, Löfling collected plants with the help of his two assistants. Löfling stayed in South America until his death on 22 February 1756 in Guyana.

=== Daniel Rolander, Suriname (1755) ===
Daniel Rolander (1725–1793) followed Linnaeus' acquaintance, Carl Gustav Dahlberg, to Suriname in 1755. Although he became ill on the way, he had almost recovered by the time he arrived. In Suriname he tried to explore the rainforests but disliked the climate. He developed an alcohol addiction and his health began to decline. He stayed for seven months and then returned with a collection containing plants and insects. He did not, however, give anything from his collection to Linnaeus. This is reported to have made Linnaeus "furious". Linnaeus, determined to acquire parts of Rolander's collection, broke into Rolander's home and reportedly stole a Sauvagesia plant. This incident ended the relationship between the two men and Linnaeus was heard to speak ill of Rolander on several occasions.

=== Anton Rolandsson Martin, Spitsbergen (1758) ===
Anton Rolandsson Martin (1729–1785) was born in what is now Estonia and later came to Sweden to be taught by Linnaeus. Linnaeus helped Martin get a small grant from Sweden's Royal Academy of Sciences to go to Spitsbergen, an island in the Arctic Ocean. In 1758, Martin joined a whaling expedition to the island but was only able to get ashore a few hours. He managed to bring back mosses and lichen. Despite how few samples he was able to bring back, Martin's expedition gained Linnaeus' praise.

=== Carl Fredrik Adler, East Indies, China and Java (c. 1761) ===
Carl Fredrik Adler (1720–1761) sailed to the East Indies in 1761 on a Swedish East India Company ship. He also visited China and Java on the same expedition. His journey was short. He died later in the year of his departure while still in Java. However, before his death he had succeeded in sending some samples back to Linnaeus from China.

=== Pehr Forsskål, Egypt and Yemen (1761–1763) ===
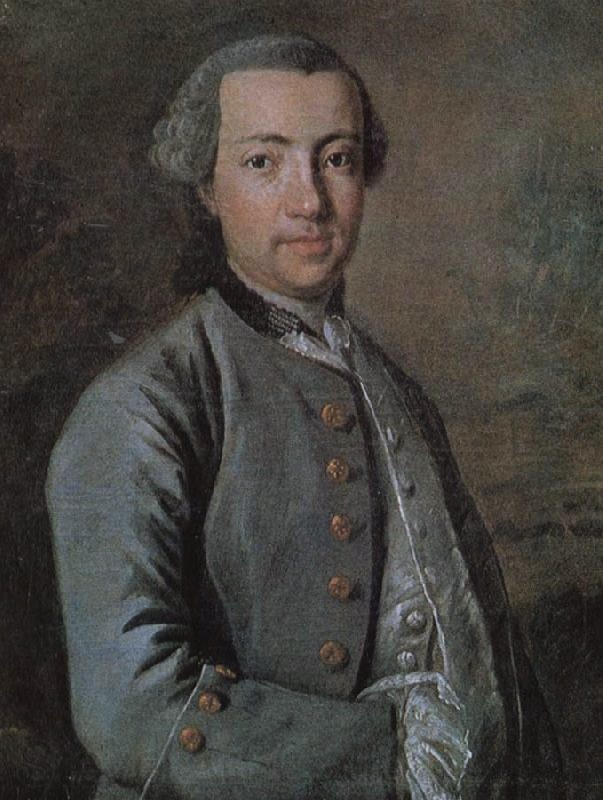
Pehr Forsskål

Pehr Forsskål (1732–1763) was born in Finland and became a student of Linnaeus when he was 18 years old. Forsskål was asked if he wanted to join a Danish expedition, commissioned by the Danish King Frederick V, to the Middle East. He consulted Linnaeus and was given permission to go. Although it was a Danish expedition, King Frederick V stated that the findings would not be placed in Copenhagen until several international botanists, including Linnaeus, had studied them. Forsskål and the expedition sailed in the winter of 1761. Their first stop was Alexandria, Egypt. Forsskål made many findings at Suez and was one of the first to describe the flora and fauna of the Red Sea. The expedition reached Yemen in April 1763 where Forsskål found a Commiphora which Linnaeus was particularity interested in. However, Forsskål died of malaria on 11 July 1763 before he could deliver Commiphora to Linnaeus. Forsskål worked on Flora Aegyptiaco-Arabica and Descriptiones Animalis during the expedition. His works were published posthumously in 1775 by another expedition member. Carsten Niebuhr.

=== Göran Rothman, Tunisia and Libya (1773–1776) ===
Göran Rothman (1739–1778) studied medicine at Uppsala University and carried out his dissertation with Linnaeus as his supervisor. In 1773 Rothman travelled to North Africa that was commissioned by the Swedish Academy of Sciences. He visited Libya and Tunisia but was unable to go as far inland as he wished due to local unrest. He returned to Sweden in 1776 with very few findings.

=== Johan Peter Falk, Russia (1768–1774) ===
Johan Peter Falk (1732–1774) arrived in Uppsala University in 1751 and became an apostle. He followed Linnaeus on his expedition to the island province Gotland and later became a tutor to Linnaeus' son, Carl. In 1760, Linnaeus encouraged Falk to follow apostle Forsskål on the Danish expedition to Egypt but Falk did not gain approval from the Danes. In 1768, the Russian Academy of Sciences created several expeditions to explore eastern Russia. Thanks to Linnaeus, Falk was given responsibility for one of the expeditions and headed out the same year. The expedition explored many places in Russia, including Volgograd and the steppes. Falk explored and described native customs as well as both flora and fauna. During the journey Falk became addicted to opium and caused him to suffer depression throughout the expedition. In 1774 the expedition reached Kazan where Falk committed suicide. Following his death, his collections and journals were sent to Saint Petersburg to be later completed and published as Beyträga zur topografischen Kenntniss des Russichen Reichs in 1785–86 by Samuel Georg Gmelin.

=== Daniel Solander, Australia etc. (1768–1771) and Iceland (1772) ===
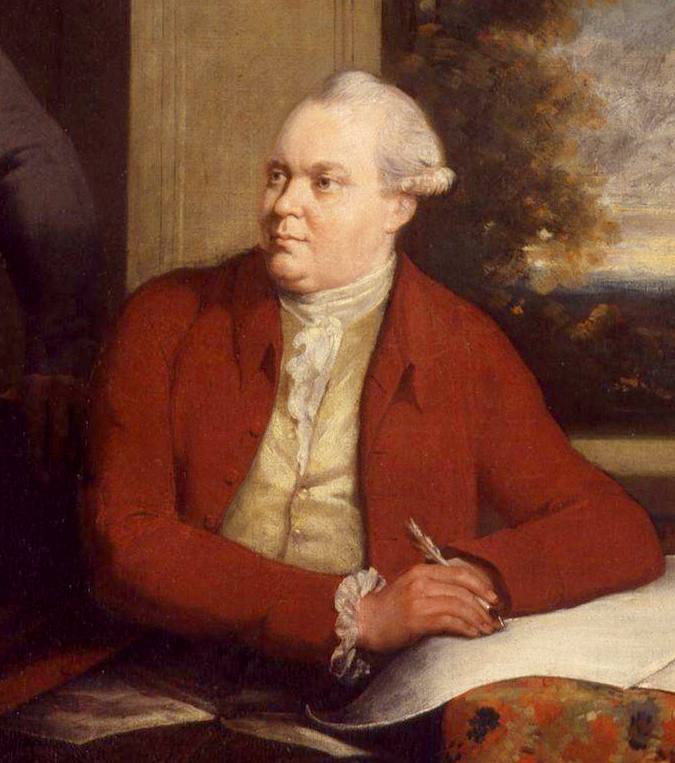
Daniel Solander

Daniel Solander (1733–1782) was living in Linnaeus's house during his time as a student in Uppsala. Linnaeus was fond of him, promising Solander his eldest daughter's hand in marriage and telling Solander that he would become his successor. Based on Linnaeus's recommendation, Solander travelled to England in 1760 where he spread the Linnaean taxonomy. Two years later Linnaeus got Solander a position as professor in botany in Saint Petersburg. Linnaeus was surprised and disappointed when Solander answered that he had decided to stay in England. This damaged their relationship and thereafter Linnaeus was heard to refer to "the ungrateful Solander." In 1768 Solander was employed by the English botanist Joseph Banks to follow James Cook on his first journey to the Pacific Ocean aboard the Endeavour. The Endeavour sailed to Australia, Asia, Africa and several other places where Solander and Banks made many natural sciences discoveries. About a year after the expedition, in 1772, Solander and Banks made another botanical journey to Iceland. He never sent anything from his collection home to Linnaeus, but continued to organise his samples according to Linnaeus's system.

=== Anders Sparrman, China (1765–1767), South Africa (1771–1772 and 1775) Oceania etc. (1772–1775) Senegal (1787) ===
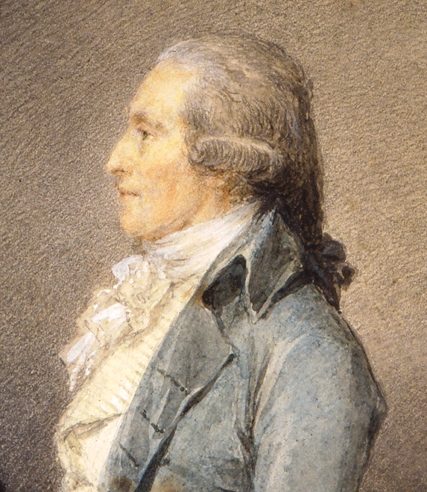
Anders Sparrman

Even before he became an apostle, Anders Sparrman (1748–1820) had made a two-year-long journey to China as a surgeon on a Swedish East India Company ship. In 1771, he sailed to South Africa as one of Linnaeus' apostles where he tutored and explored the flora and fauna. The next year he was asked to join Cook's second expedition on Resolution. On the journey, he visited and studied plants in various locations including Oceania and South America. He returned to South Africa two years later having made many botanical findings. He stayed there for another eight months before returning to Uppsala in 1776. In 1787, he travelled to Senegal on an expedition to find land for colonisation. He published his travel diary Resa till Goda Hopps-Udden, södra Polkretsen och omkring Jordklotet, samt till Hottentott- och Caffer-Landen Åren 1772-1776 in three volumes, 1783-1818.

=== Carl Peter Thunberg, South Africa, Japan etc. (1770–1779) ===
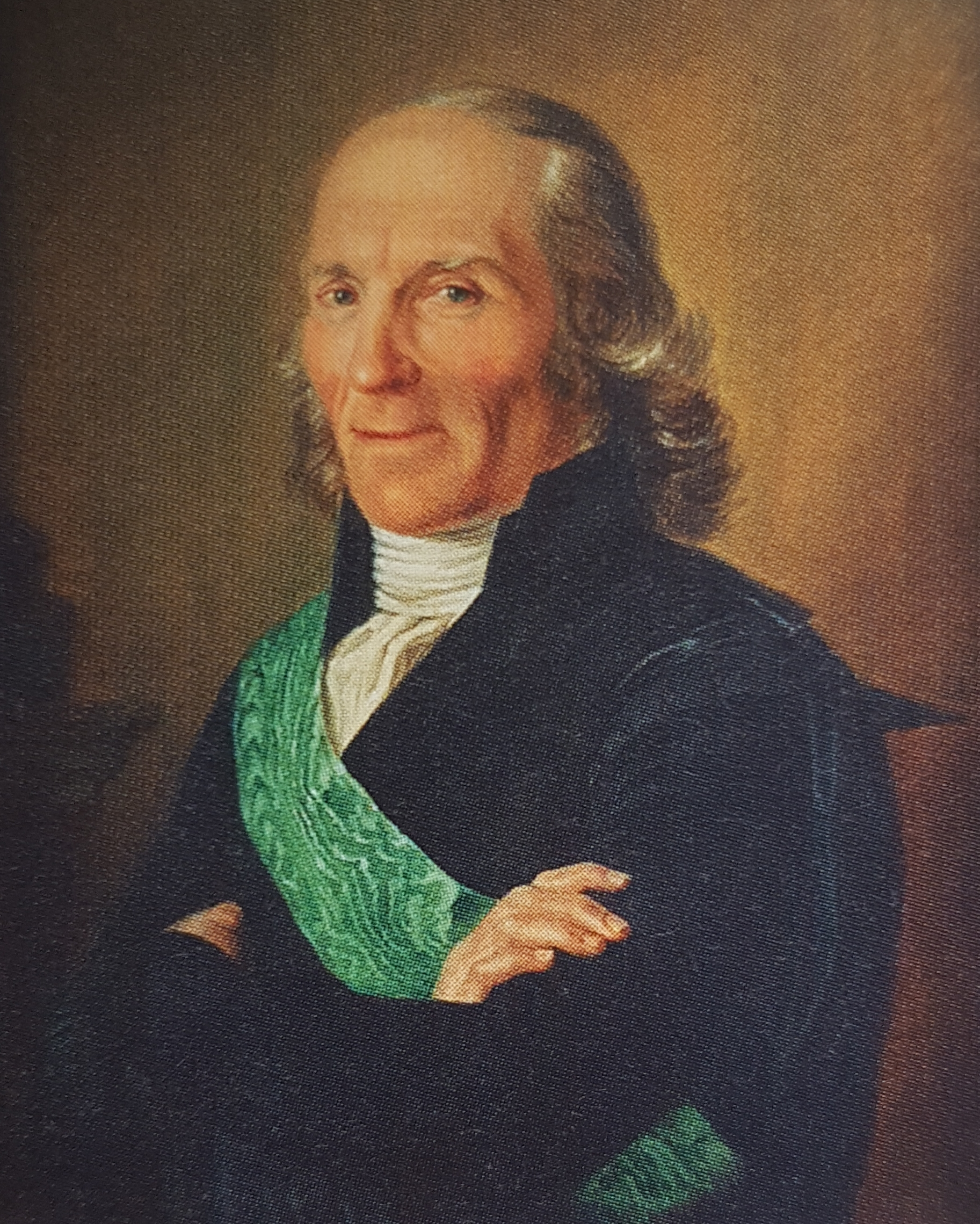
Carl Peter Thunberg

Just like Linnaeus, Carl Peter Thunberg (1743–1828) arrived in Uppsala at the age of 18. Having completed his dissertation in 1770, he travelled to Paris. On the way back to Sweden he met Linnaeus' friend Johannes Burman in Amsterdam. With Burman's influence, Thunberg became a surgeon in the Dutch East India Company. He joined an expedition heading to Japan, which at that time was only open for Dutch ships. The expedition stopped in South Africa in 1772 where it remained for three years. During this time Thunberg found 300 new plant species and sent many of his findings to Linnaeus. In 1775, the expedition continued to Java and then to Japan. All foreigners in Japan were forced to stay on the Dejima island, outside Nagasaki, so it was difficult for Thunberg to study the mainland flora. However, he got many translators to bring him some mainland specimens to add to those plants he found in the gardens of Dejima. The only time Thunberg could explore the Japanese landscape was when he visited the shōgun in Edo. After 15 months, he returned to Sweden, passing Sri Lanka on the way. From his findings in Japan, Thunberg published Flora Japonica. From his findings in South Africa, he published Flora Capensis.

=== Andreas Berlin, Guinea (1773) ===
Andreas Berlin (1746–1773) studied in Uppsala University with Linnaeus as his student before travelling to London to find a botanical expedition he could join. In 1773 he travelled to Guinea with the English naturalist Henry Smeathman. The purpose of the expedition was to explore the central parts of Africa but prior to reaching the mainland, Berlin died of a stomach illness while on the Îles de Los. Before his death, Berlin managed to send a few plants to Linnaeus.

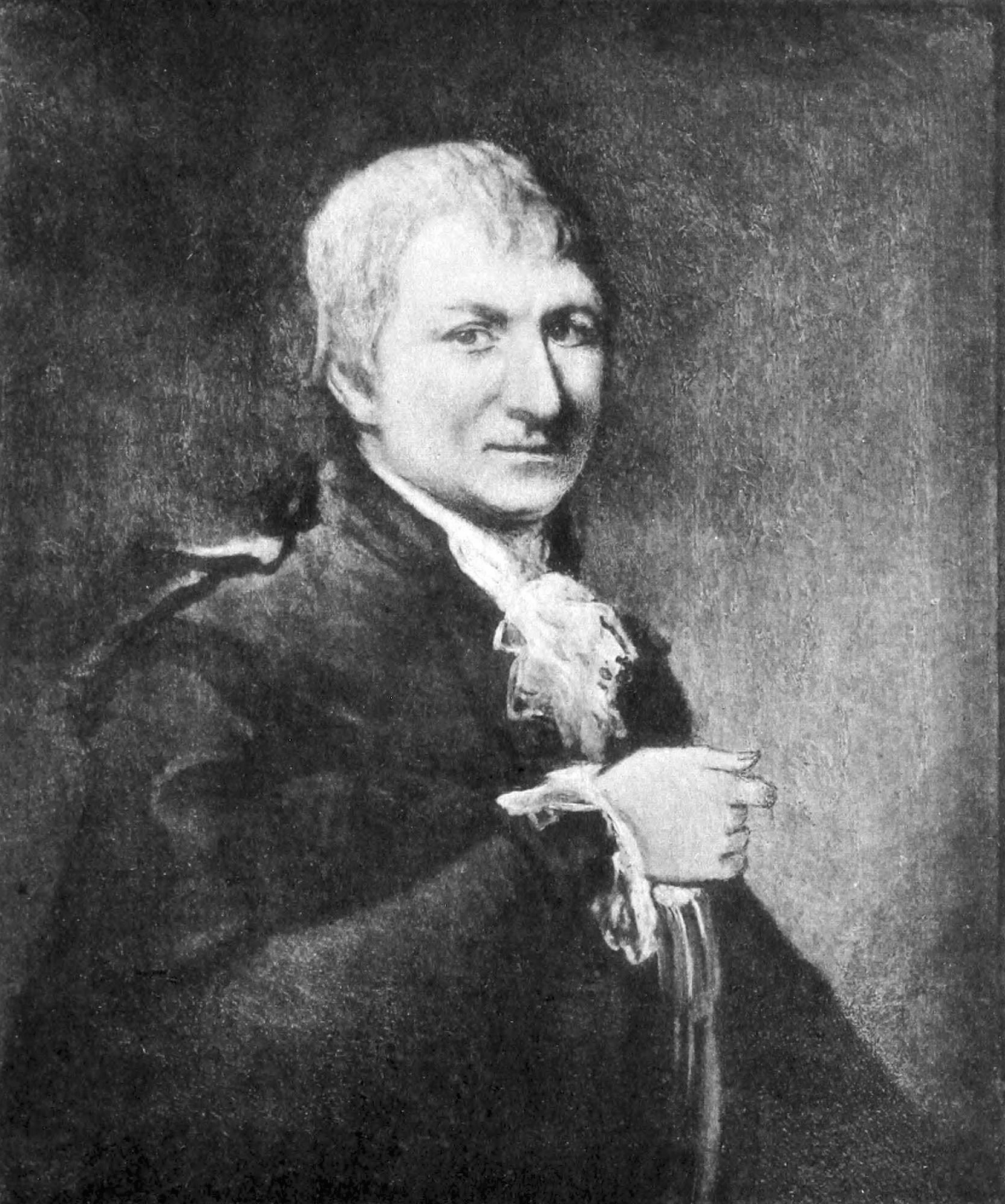
Adam Afzelius

=== Adam Afzelius, Sierra Leone (1792–1796) ===
Adam Afzelius (1750–1837) joined an English expedition to Sierra Leone in 1792 after studying and lecturing in Uppsala. He returned in 1796 having found many new samples, which he described in some of his botanical writings. He also published Linnaeus' autobiography.
