= Birger Martin Hall =

Swedish district medical officer and botanist

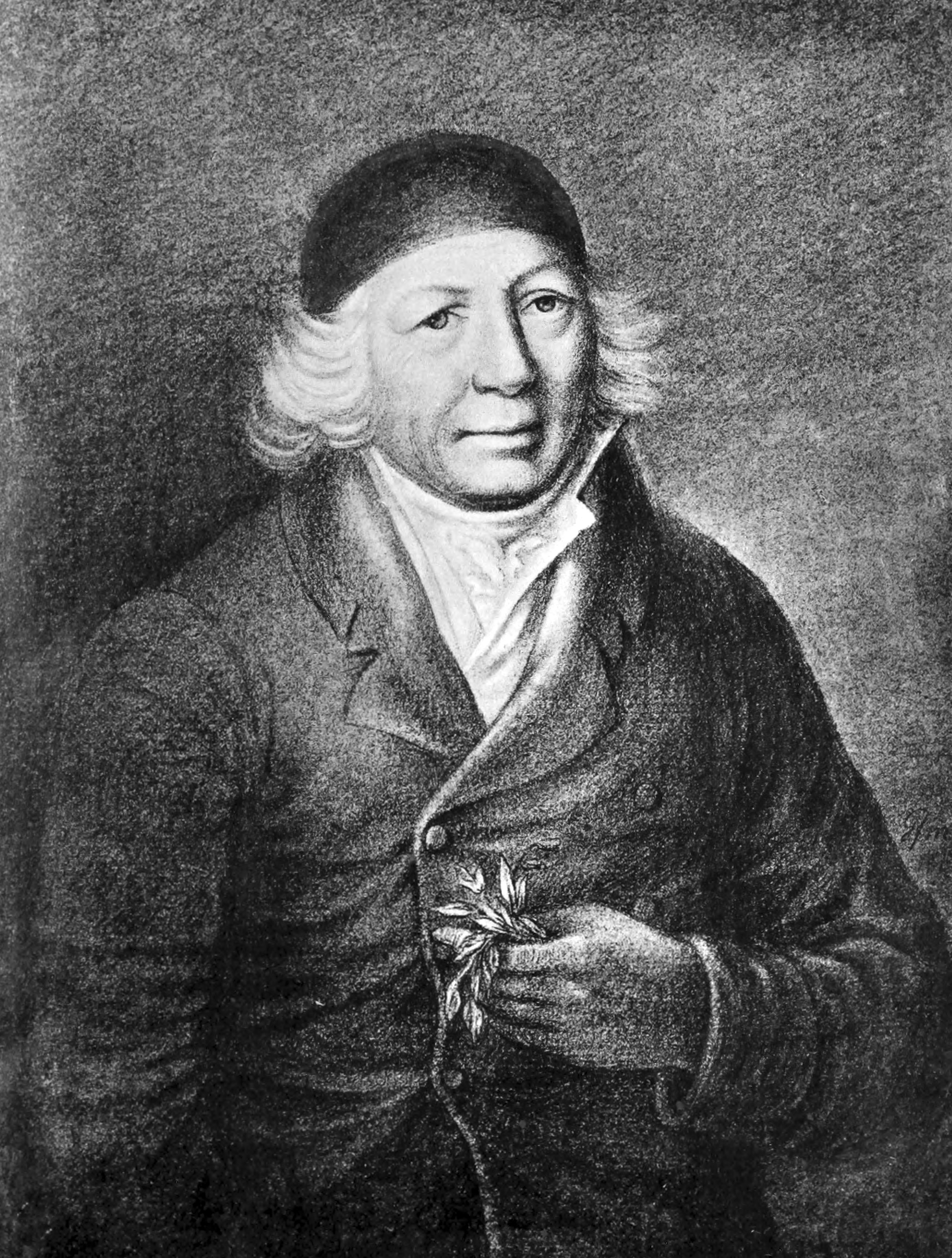
Portrait of Birger Martin Hall

Birger Martin Hall (26 August 1741, in Borås – 10 August 1815, in Västerås), was a Swedish district medical officer and botanist. He was soon one of Linnaeus' disciples, but chose medicine in front of botany.

== Early life ==
Hall was born to a merchant and magistrate in Borås, who was also a Member of Parliament, Petter Börjesson Hall (1707-1776) and Eva Margareta. Eva was an older cousin of the astronomer Pehr Wilhelm Wargentin. Together with his older brother Peter Adolf, Hall studied medicine and 'natural history' between 1753 and 1755 at Uppsala University's medical faculty where Carl Linnaeus taught. In the following years, 1755–59, he pursued further medical studies abroad, under the guidance of master Lars Brisman, including in Greifswald (Swedish Pomerania), Berlin and Hamburg. He then returned to Uppsala.

== Medical career ==
In June 1762 he defended his dissertation botanical Nectaria Florum before Professor Linnaeus. The topic was the presence of honey glands of the flowers, what kinds there are and how they work. It was the first detailed report on the subject and gave examples of flowers with different types of honey glands or Nektaria. Carl Linnaeus had in 1763 published the essay in Volume VI of Amoenitates Academicae ('academic amusements'). In 1778 Dr. Hall gave out his own Swedish translation of this pioneering work. Linnaeus disciple and fellow student Carl Peter Thunberg named a flowering and fruit-bearing species after Hall. The genus belongs to the family of legumes and bears the name Hallia. 25 species are described.

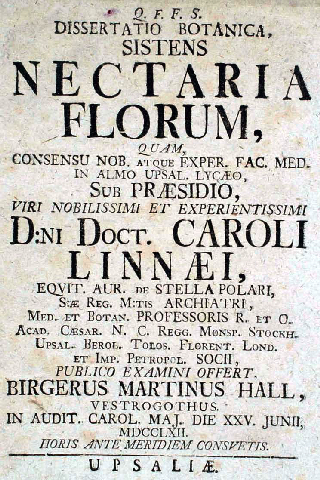
The cover of the first edition of Nectaria Florum, flyleaf, 1763

Hall began as the surgeon at the hospital Nosoconium academicum, currently at Uppsala University Hospital, in 1764. After a few years he took his surgical exam under the supervision of inspectors from Collegium Medicum. In 1768 he was conferred to MD, which for this time was at an unusually young age, and thereafter practiced as a doctor in Stockholm. In 1773 he became a district medical officer in Västerås, a post he fulfilled for 20 years. To get an idea of all that he had to deal with, a detailed autopsy report written by Dr. Hall in connection with a murder case in 1778 read in #1 of the online magazine Gammelbo Allehanda. At the age of 52, in 1793, he resigned and retired due to illness.

== Family ==
On March 13, 1777, he married Anna Engel Schenström (1748-1801), daughter of a merchant, in Västerås. They had three daughters and a son together. Their son major general Birger Hall was knighted von Hall.

== Death ==
At his death Dr. Hall's bequeathment includes a collection of manuscripts that systematically described fungi with accompanying drawings. He was a great collector and had an extensive library of medicine and science, a large insect collection and a very large herbarium. He donated 770 plants to the grammar school in Västerås, most gathered in the . At the Royal Coin Cabinet are also a couple of old handwritten lists, 51 and 80 pages long, over a remarkable coin, banknote and medal collection he owned. He is said to have been an avid purchaser of Swedish medieval coins from soil deposits. He also had a number of rare banknotes, one of Stockholm Banco 50 daler sm (silver coin) from the year of 1666.
