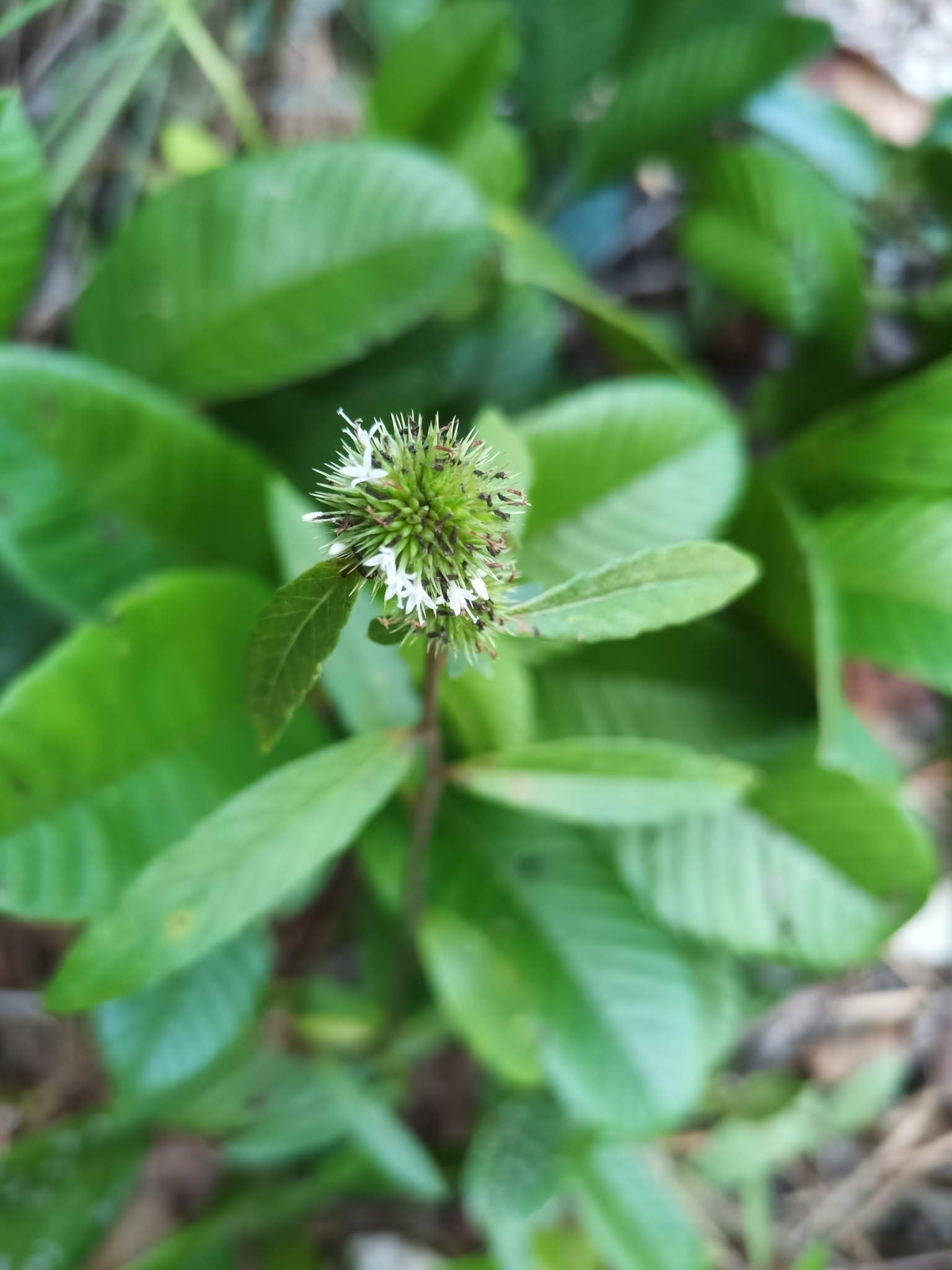
- Rolandra fruticosa in French Guiana

Scientific classification
- Kingdom: Plantae
- Clade: Tracheophytes
- Clade: Angiosperms
- Clade: Eudicots
- Clade: Asterids
- Order: Asterales
- Family: Asteraceae
- Subfamily: Cichorioideae
- Tribe: Vernonieae
- Genus: Rolandra; Rottb.
- Species: R. fruticosa

Binomial name
- Rolandra fruticosa (L.) Kuntze

Synonyms
- Echinops fruticosus L.; Rolandra argentea Rottb. (type species of Rolandra); Rolandra monacantha Cass.; Rolandra diacantha Cass.; Echinops nodiflorus Lam.; Echinops fruticosa L.

= Rolandra =

Genus of plants

Rolandra is a genus of flowering plants in the tribe Vernonieae within the family Asteraceae.

Species

The only species is Rolandra fruticosa, native to Central and South America plus the West Indies. It is also reportedly naturalized in Japan and Java.

Formerly included

see Ichthyothere Trichospira

- Rolandra reptans Willd. ex Less. - Trichospira verticillata (L.) S.F.Blake
- Rolandra septans Willd. ex Less. - Trichospira verticillata (L.) S.F.Blake
- Rolandra terminalis Spreng. - Ichthyothere terminalis (Spreng.) S.F.Blake
