= Andreas Berlin =

Swedish naturalist

Andreas (Anders) Berlin (20 May 1746 – 12 June 1773) was a Swedish naturalist, one of the "apostles of Linnaeus", though not among the more successful.

The son of Henrik Berlin (1704–1781) and his wife Anna Catharina Hellström (1711–1799), Berlin matriculated at Uppsala University 13 February 1765 and studied there with Carl Linnaeus in 1767-68 and with professor of medicine Jonas Sidrén in 1768–1769, before travelling to London with a Stiegler fellowship, to find a botanical expedition he could join. In the meantime he assisted Sir Joseph Banks and Banks's assistant Daniel Solander, another of Linnaeus' "apostles".

In 1773 Berlin travelled to Guinea with the English botanist Henry Smeathman. The purpose of the expedition, which was sponsored by members of the Royal Society, was to explore the central parts of West Africa but prior to reaching the mainland, Berlin died of a stomach illness while on the Îles de Los. Before his death, Berlin managed to send a few plants to Linnaeus.
