= Fredrik Hasselqvist =

Swedish traveller and naturalist

Fredrik Hasselquist
- Born: 3 January 1722; Törnevalla, Östergötland
- Died: 9 February 1752 (aged 30); Buca, Sanjak of Suğla, Ottoman Empire
- Education: Uppsala University
- Known for: Collection of natural history specimens from Asia Minor
- Scientific career
- Fields: Naturalist
- Author abbrev. (botany): Hasselq.

Fredrik Hasselquist (3 January 1722 – 9 February 1752) was a Swedish traveller and naturalist.

Hasselquist was born at Törnevalla, which is two kilometers east of Linghem, Östergötland. He studied under Carl Linnaeus at Uppsala University and became one of the "Apostles of Linnaeus". On account of the frequently expressed regrets of Carl Linnaeus at the lack of information regarding the natural history of the Levant, Hasselquist resolved to undertake a journey to that country. With a sufficient subscription having been obtained to defray expenses, he reached Smyrna towards the end of 1749.

He visited parts of Asia Minor, Egypt, Cyprus and the Land of Palestine, making large natural history collections, but his constitution, naturally weak, gave way under the fatigues of travel, and he died in Buca near Smyrna on his way home.

His collections reached home in safety, and five years after his death his notes were published by Linnaeus under the title Iter Palæstinum, Eller Resa til Heliga Landet, Förrättad Ifrån år 1749 til 1752, which was translated into French and German in 1762 and into English in 1766 (as Voyages and Travels in the Levant, in the Years 1749, 50, 51, 52).

He was elected a member of the Royal Swedish Academy of Sciences in 1750.

Hasselquist is commemorated in the scientific name of a species of lizard, Ptyodactylus hasselquistii.
