= Anton Rolandsson Martin =

Swedish botanist

Anton Rolandsson Martin (3 August 1729 at Mündi manor (Müntenhoff) near Paide, Estonia, Russian Empire – 30 January 1785 in Åbo) was a Swedish botanist.

He was a son of Roland Martin, who later became an appeals court judge, and was born when the family was visiting friends in the Russian Empire (in an area now in Estonia). In the mid-1730s, the family moved to Åbo (Turku) in present-day Finland (then part of Sweden), as the father received a position as secretary at the appeals court (hovrätt) there. Martin was enrolled at Royal Academy of Åbo in 1745, where he spent time as a musician and music teacher, while at the same time doing botanical excursions and discovering several plants previously unknown in Finland.

He worked as a tutor in Stockholm 1753–1756. After coming into contact with Pehr Wargentin, the permanent secretary of Royal Swedish Academy of Sciences, and presenting some papers to the academy, he was enrolled as an apprentice student at the academy in 1756. He also enrolled at Uppsala University 1756, and received a bachelor's degree in medicine in Uppsala 1761.

In Uppsala, Carl Linnaeus was teaching, and he was sufficiently impressed with Martin to select him to travel with a whaleship to collect specimens from the Arctic regions and become a pioneering Arctic researcher. In April 1758, Martin left Gothenburg on a whaleship belonging to the Swedish Greenland Company. The three-month trip went as far north as the 80th parallel, encountered difficult weather conditions, and Martin was only ashore for a few hours, on some small islands to the west of Spitsbergen. The trip did however produce valuable weather observations, and collections of marine life and birds. In 1760, he did a trip to Norway's west coast, and made collections of marine life using Bergen as a base. He also studied causes of leper and migrations of herring.

In 1761, after his degree in medicine, he moved to Stockholm intending to finish his education and at the same time practice as a physician. In the autumn he became ill, and after months of pain he was forced have his right leg amputated after it had been attacked by gangrene. He thereafter abandoned his plans for a higher degree, and in 1763 went to Finland, where he lived on small means in different cities but from 1770 in Åbo, receiving some financial support from friends. He continued to make scientific observations and experiments, in particular relating to physiology.
