= Christen Friis Rottbøll =

Danish physician and botanist

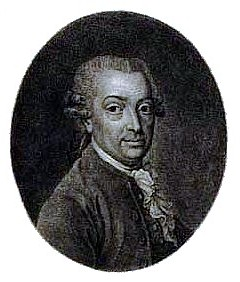
Christen Friis Rottbøll Portrait

Christen Friis Rottbøll (3 March 1727, at Hørbygård, Denmark – 15 June 1797, in Copenhagen) was a Danish physician and botanist. He was a pupil of Carolus Linnaeus. The standard author abbreviation Rottb. is used to indicate this person as the author when citing a botanical name.

== Early life ==
Rottbøll was born on the Hørbygaard estate at Holbæk, the son of Christen Michelsen Rottbøll (died 1729) and Margrethe Cathrine Friis. His father was the manager of the estate but died in 1729. His mother was married second time to manager of Hagestedgaard Ole Nielsen Faxøe.

== Education and career ==
Rottbøll studied at the University of Copenhagen, first theology, then medicine, in which he took his doctorate degree in 1755 (De morbis deuteropathicis seu Sympathier). He then travelled abroad 1757–1761 to further his studies of medicine, and to study chemistry and botany – the latter subject at Uppsala University with Linnaeus.

From 1761, he was executive at the Botanic Garden in Copenhagen, and succeeded Georg Christian Oeder as its director in 1770. He was appointed professor at the Chair of Medicine in 1776 and received the title of "royal adviser" (konferensråd) in 1784.

== Work on smallpox ==
As a medical doctor, he studied smallpox and reformed the vaccination programme that had run in Copenhagen since 1755. He abolished pre and post treatment and instead advised systematic weakening of the inoculum before application.

== Botany ==
As a botanist, Rottbøll gave out the first comprehensive list of the Flora of Greenland, he published descriptions of plants from the Danish colonies in India collected by Johann Gerhard König, and similarly of plants from Suriname collected by Daniel Rolander. Corresponding with Lorenz Praetorius (1708-1781) of the Danish Moravian Church, Rottbøll also solicited the collection of plant specimens in 1766 by Moravians in North America.

Rottbøll named the plant genus Rolandra (Asteraceae) after Rolander and the genus Kyllinga (Cyperaceae) after Peder Kylling. Carolus Linnaeus the Younger named the genus Rottboellia (Poaceae) after him.

== Personal life ==
Rottbøll married three times. His first wife was Ursula Schnabel (1732-1767), a daughter of rector Bernhard Schnabel (1691–1754) and Sophie Rasmusdatter (1700–52). They married on 10 May 1762 in Roskilde. His second wife was Johanne Elisabeth Mangor (1740-1771), a daughter of pharmacist Christopher Heerfordt Mangor (1704–82) and Anna Saur (c. 1715–83). They married on 18 May 1768 in Trinitatis Church in Copenhagen. His third wife was Catharina Hedvig Wohlert (1750-1811), a daughter of turner Daniel Jacob Wohlert. They married on 29 September 1777 in Schleswig.
