= Pleasance =

Pleasance may refer to:

== People ==
- Pleasance Pendred (1864–1948), British women's rights activist and suffragette
- Pleasance Smith (1773–1877), English letter writer, literary editor and centenarian
- Richard Pleasance, Australian rock musician and record producer
- Simon Pleasance (born 1944), Anglo-French art translator and writer

== Other uses ==
- Pleasance (street), a street just outside the Old Town of Edinburgh, Scotland
- The Pleasance, a theatre, bar, sports and recreation complex on the street
  - Pleasance Theatre Trust, often simply called The Pleasance, a Scottish venue operator and producer of live events
- Pleasance B.C., a basketball club based in Edinburgh
- Pleasance Islington, also known as the Pleasance Theatre, a fringe theatre in Islington, London

== See also ==
- Emslie Horniman's Pleasance, a park in the Borough of Kensington and Chelsea in London
- Pleasence, a surname
