= Pleasance (surname) =

Pleasance is a surname. Notable people with the surname include:

- Richard Pleasance (21st century), Australian musician and record producer
- Simon Pleasance (born 1944), Anglo-French art translator and writer

== See also ==
- Pleasence, another surname
