= Sara Elisabeth Moræa =

Wife of Carl Linnaeus (1716–1806)

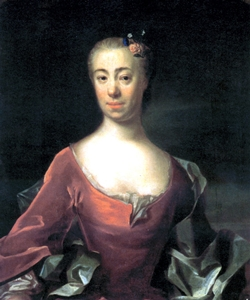
- Sara Elisabeth Moræa, 1739.
- Born: 26 April 1716; Falun, Sweden
- Died: 20 April 1806 (aged 89); Uppsala, Sweden
- Resting place: Uppsala Cathedral
- Spouse: Carl Linnaeus (m. 1739; died 1778)
- Children: 7, including Carl Linnaeus the Younger; Elisabeth Christina von Linné Sara Christina von Linné
- Parent(s): Johan Moraeus, Elisabeth Hansdotter
- Family: Linné family

Sara Elisabeth "Sara Lisa" von Linné (née Moræa; 26 April 1716 – 20 April 1806) was a Swedish woman who was married to Carl Linnaeus and was mother to Carl Linnaeus the Younger and Elisabeth Christina von Linné. She was involved in the creation of the Linnean Society of London through the auctioning of her late husband's scientific papers. She is one of the historic Swedish women who have streets named after her in the Kärringstan district of Enskededalen, Stockholm (Sara Moraeas väg).

== Biography ==
Sara Elisabeth Moræa was born in Falun, Sweden, in 1716, the daughter of Johan Moraeus (1672–1742; a physician at Falun mine) and his wife Elisabeth Hansdotter (1691–1769). Her parents had a total of seven children. Both her parents came from the wealthy bourgeoisie and she grew up on Svedens gård outside Falun. She attended school and received a formal education.

In February 1735, Carl Linnaeus proposed to Sara Elisabeth when he was travelling through Dalarna. Her father accepted the proposal on the condition that Carl would travel abroad before his marriage and take his doctorate so that he could support his family.

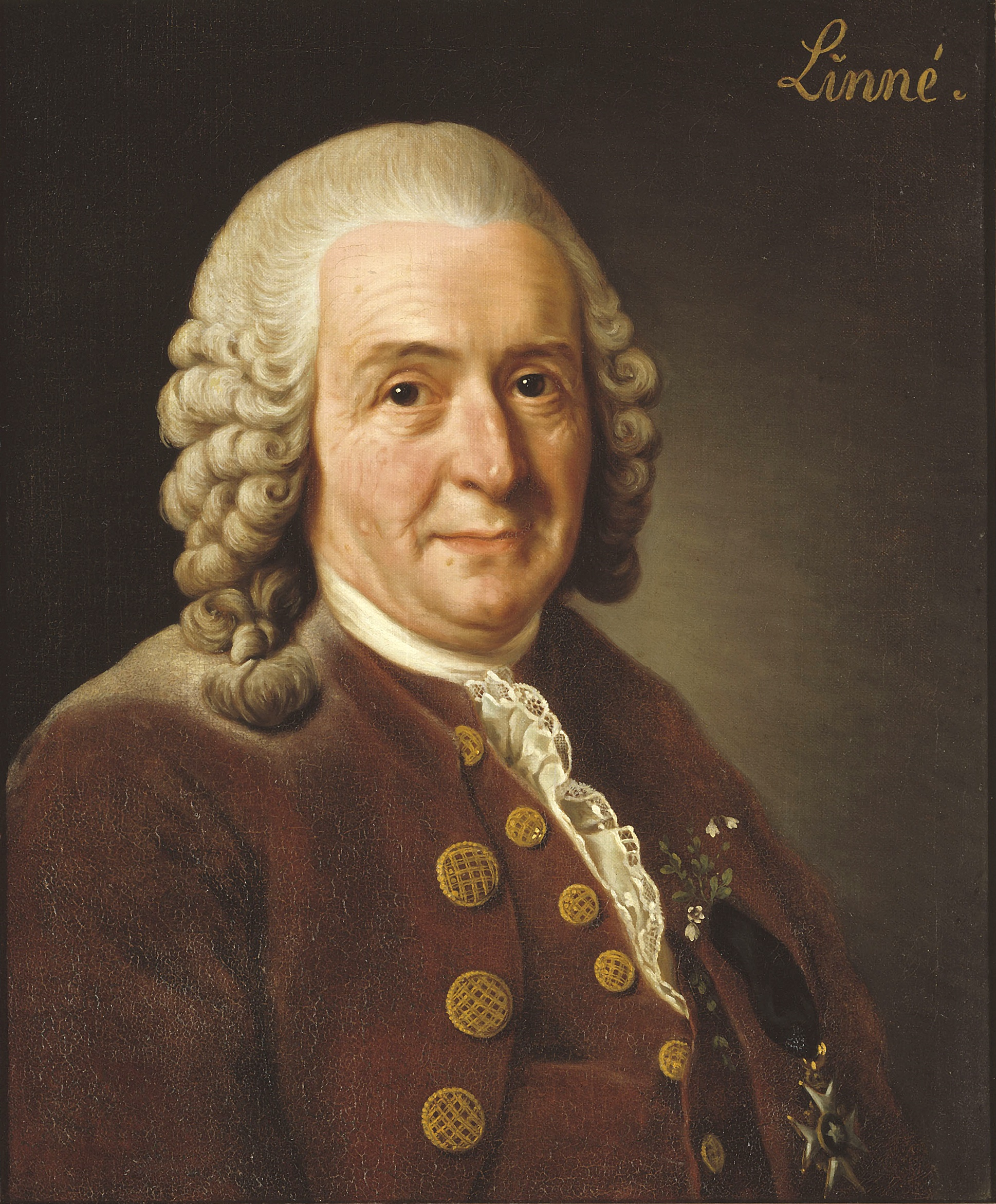
Husband Carl Linnaeus

Carl went to the Netherlands, and during the time Sara Elisabeth was engaged, she lived a good life with many parties and among friends in the bourgeoisie of Falun. This period of her life is preserved in the diaries of friends and acquaintances.

In 1738, Carl Linnaeus returned to Sweden and went to Falun to formalize his engagement to Sara Elisabeth. He then went to Stockholm to take up employment as a doctor, leaving Sara Elisabeth behind again. He did not fare well as a doctor in the capital, but through Carl Gustav Tessin, a Lord Marshal and leader of the Hats Party, he gained employment as a lecturer at Bergs Collegio and later as Admiralty Medicus through Admiral Theodor Ankarcrona. During this time he also helped found the Royal Swedish Academy of Sciences. After that, in the spring of 1739, his finances had improved enough that he was able to return to Dalarna and marry Sara Elisabeth. They were married on 26 June in what is now known as Linnés bröllopsstuga ('Linnaeus' wedding cottage'), a cottage on Svedens gård.

The marriage is believed to have been a happy one, despite contemporary and recent descriptions of Sara Elisabeth as cantankerous. Her husband's own words, however, are consistently positive, and he wrote in notes intended for their children that God "gave him the wife he most desired, and who kept house while he worked". He wrote this after 27 years of marriage. According to his notes in Nemesis Divina, it also appears that they shared a bed at Hammarby and through letters sent by Carl Linnaeus to his friend Abraham Bäck that they were still kissing when they reunited after Carl Linnaeus' many trips after 20 years of marriage. Together they had seven children, five of whom (a son and four daughters) survived to adulthood.

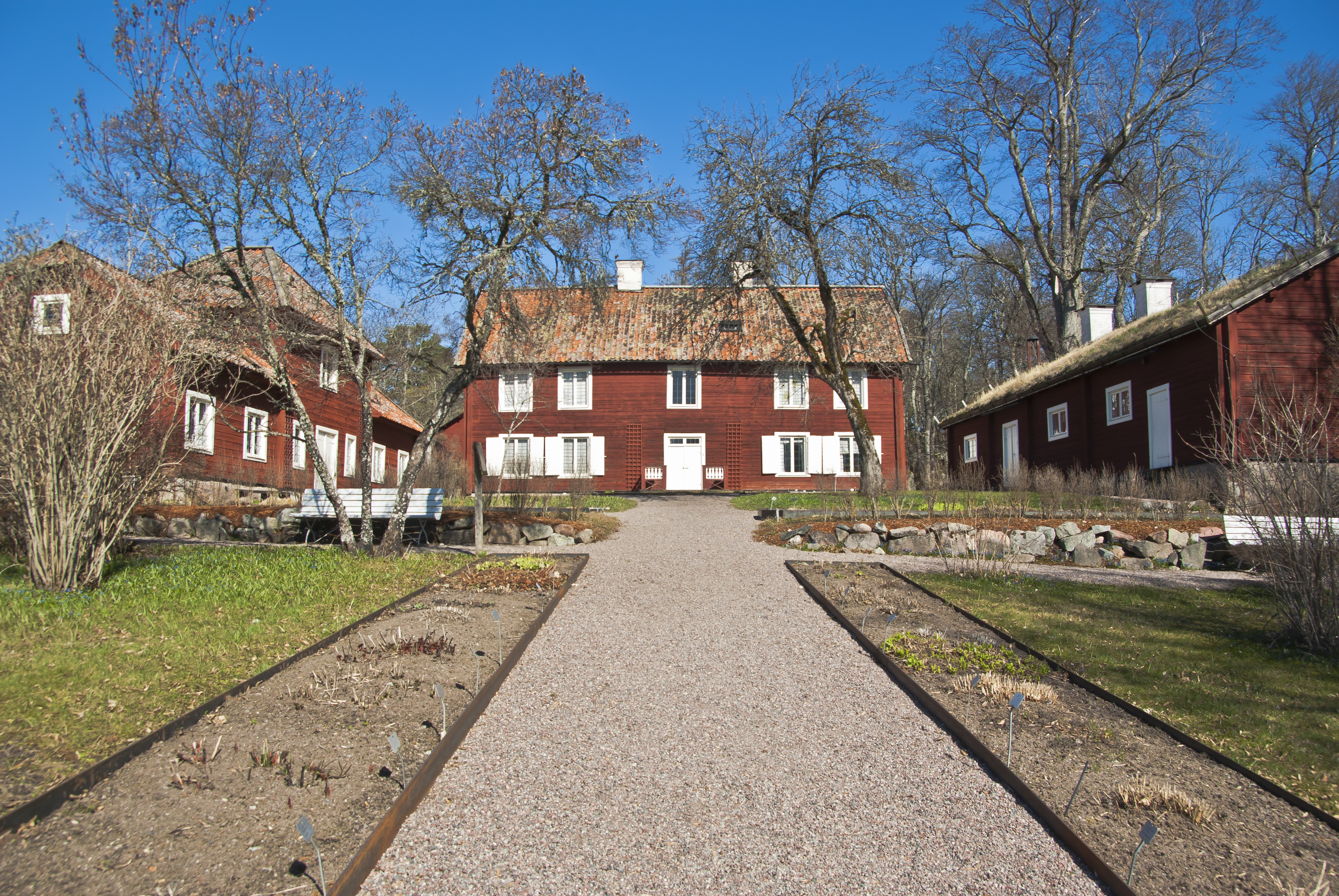
Linnaeus's Hammarby

In 1758, Carl Linnaeus bought the Hammarby estate (today Linnaeus's Hammarby) as his family's summer residence. After her husband's death in 1778, Sara Elisabeth ruled the estate for 30 years until her own death. She was not alone, however, because at the time of her husband's death all five of her children were living at home with them. The only child to marry and move out, Elisabeth Christina, had moved back home with her daughter a few years earlier because her husband had abused her. Carl and Sara Elisabeth wrote their son-in-law out of their wills because of how badly he had treated their eldest daughter and only grandchild.

The eldest children, Carl Linnaeus the Younger and Elisabeth Christina, died a few years after their father. The youngest, Sofia, married in 1781 and moved out. Sara Christina von Linné married 13 years later and moved away with her. Her daughter Lovisa, however, lived with her mother until her mother died.

When her son Carl Linnaeus the Younger died in 1783, Sara Elisabeth inherited her husband's many books, manuscripts, herbariums and correspondence. Due to financial problems, she was forced to sell most of them. According to the instructions in Carl Linnaeus' will, they were to be sold to the highest bidder, which was the Englishman James Edward Smith, who on this basis became one of the founders of the Linnean Society of London.

Sara Elisabeth Moraea died 20 April 1806 in Uppsala. She is buried along with her husband and son Carl in Uppsala Cathedral.

== Personality ==
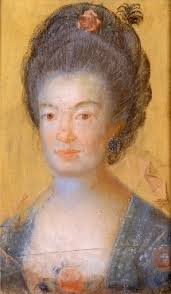
Elisabeth Christina von Linné

Sara Elisabeth has been described condescendingly both by her contemporaries and recent scholars who have written about her husband, mostly based on three quotes from Carl Linnaeus' young male students. Johan Christian Fabricius, aged 17, described the then 47-year-old Sara Elisabeth as "a big, strong woman, domineering, selfish and completely without culture". Johann Beckmann considered her terribly rude for allegedly saying that it was not worth learning German just for the sake of a student. Gustaf Adolf Reuterholm complained about having to spend time with Carl Linnaeus's "cross old wife" when neither Carl Linnaeus nor his daughters were at home. Reuterholm was 17 at the time and Sara Elisabeth was 57.

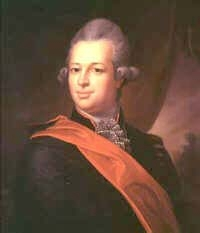
Carl the Younger

She seems to have been a strong-willed woman with poise, who managed the large household and organized the upkeep of the grounds for her husband and all his students. She continued to do this while living as a widow at Linnaeus's Hammarby. She also seems to have been interested in botany, but more in an everyday way (growing and harvesting kitchen plants, knowing what to live on in the woods and fields, making cloth from flax, weeding, canning berries and fruits, storing root vegetables, etc.) and not in a scientific way. She is said to have had good insight into economic and practical matters, but at the same time it is said that her husband was worried every time she went down to Stockholm to buy fabric.

Sara Elisabeth and Carl Linnaeus are said to have had a happy marriage, according to Carl's own notes. However, she disagreed with her husband about not allowing their daughters to attend school. When Carl was away on business, she took matters into her own hands and put their youngest daughter, Sofia, in school. When he returned, he went straight to the school and brought his daughter home again.

== Children ==
Their children were as follows;

- Carl Linnaeus the Younger (1741–1783)
- Elisabeth Christina Von Linné (1743–1782)
- Sara Magdalena (Sara Christina Von Linné) (1744–1744)
- Lovisa Von Linné (1749–1839)
- Sara Christina von Linné (1751–1835)
- Johannes Von Linné (1754–1757)
- Sofia Von Linné (1757–1830)

== In popular culture ==
- Sara Elisabeth and her husband are the main characters in the comic book Sara Lisa och Linné by Maria Bergström and Niklas Jönsson
- Catherine Hansson played her in the TV series Linné och hans apostlar (2004)
