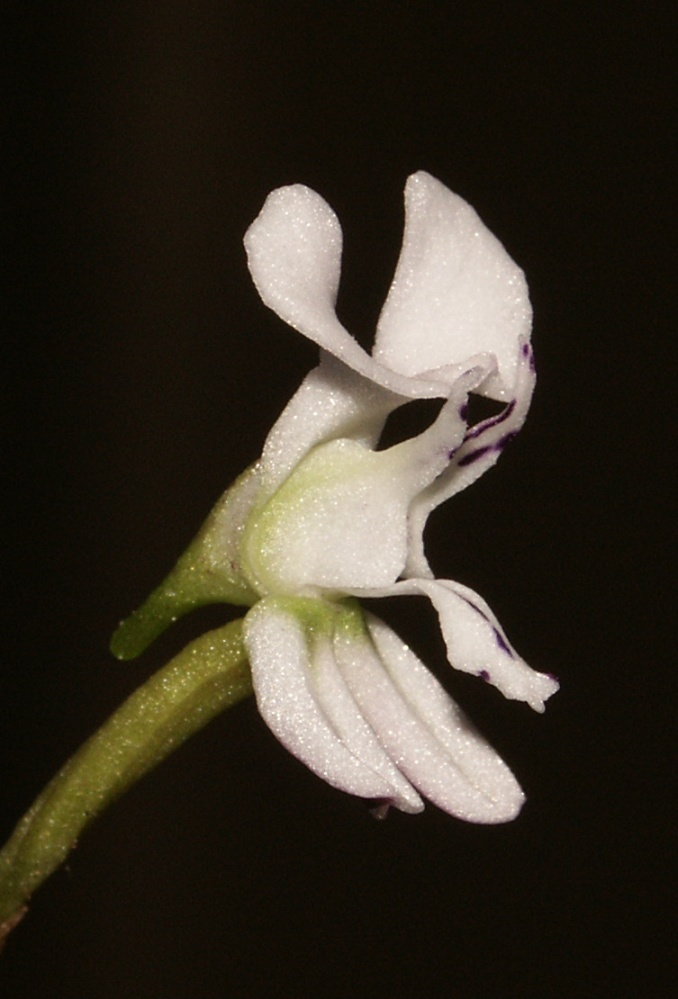

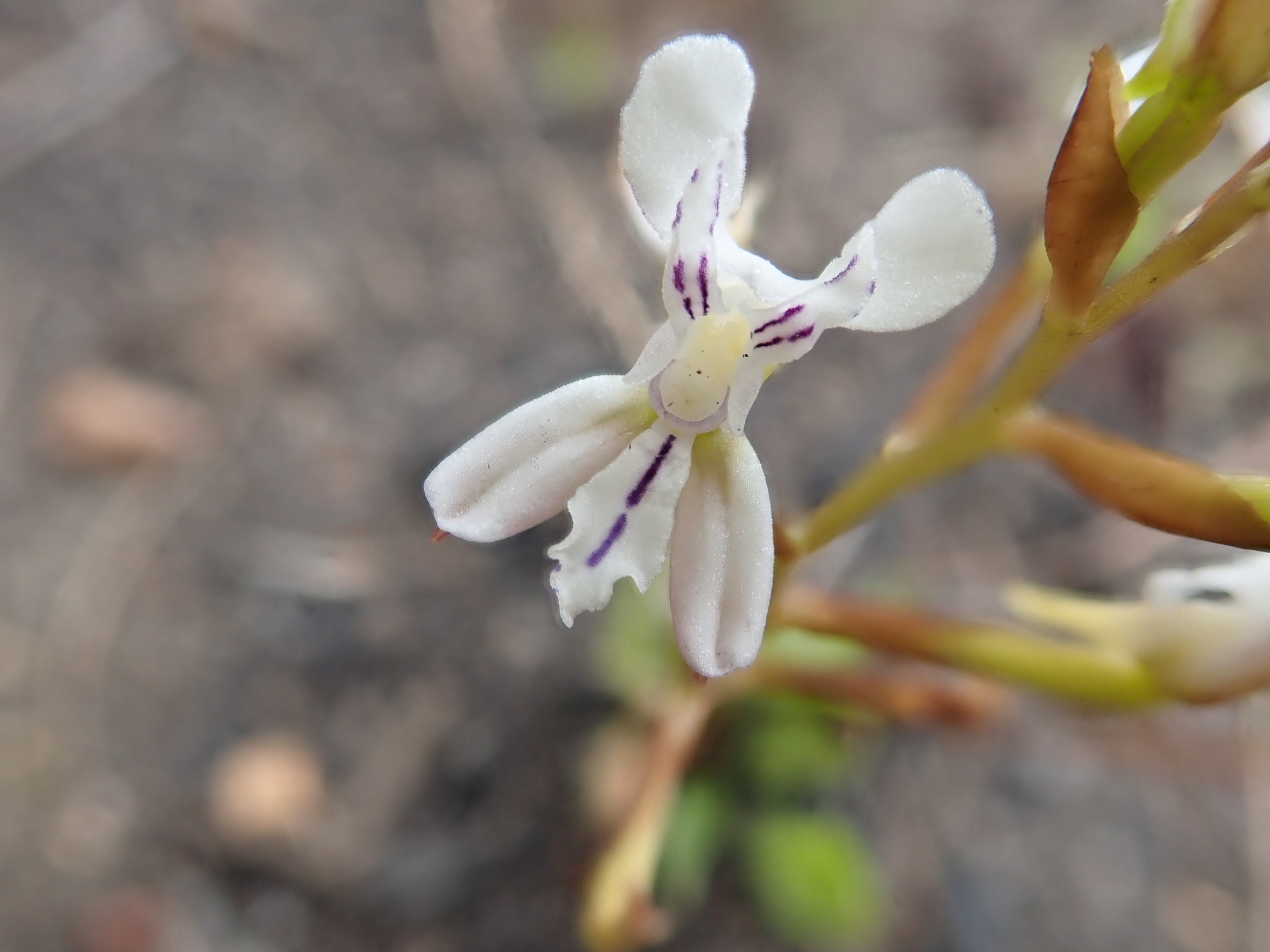

Scientific classification
- Kingdom: Plantae
- Clade: Tracheophytes
- Clade: Angiosperms
- Clade: Monocots
- Order: Asparagales
- Family: Orchidaceae
- Subfamily: Orchidoideae
- Genus: Disa
- Species: D. sagittalis

Binomial name
- Disa sagittalis (L.f.) Sw.

Synonyms
- Orchis sagittalis L.f. (Basionym); Satyrium sagittale (L.f.) Thunb.

= Disa sagittalis =

Species of orchid

Disa sagittalis is a species of orchid found in South Africa from south and southeast Cape Province to southern KwaZulu-Natal.
