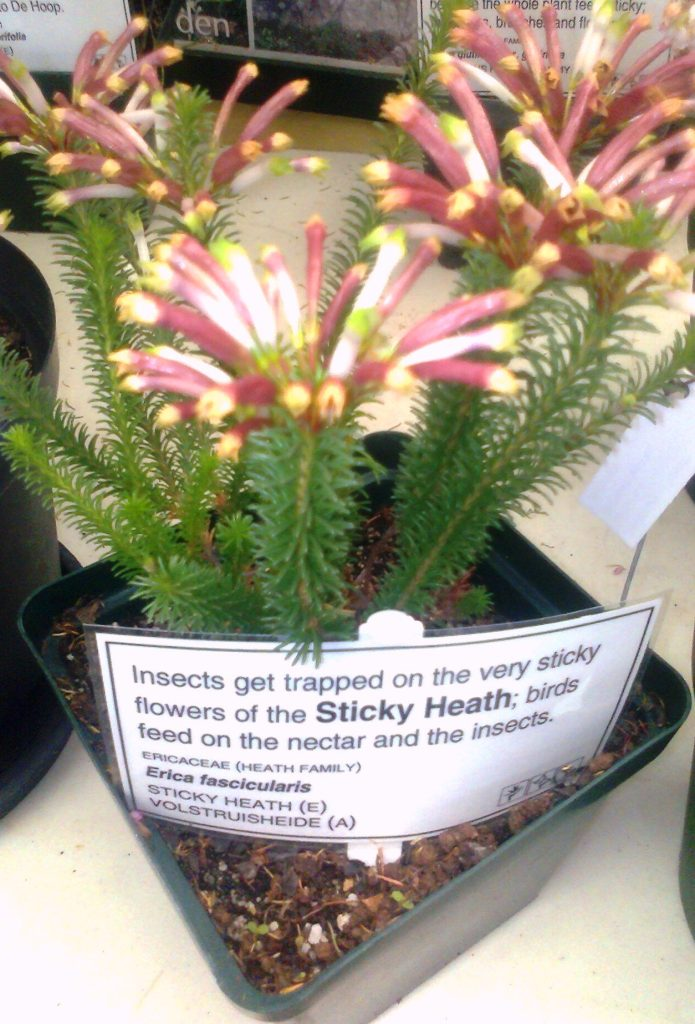

Scientific classification
- Kingdom: Plantae
- Clade: Tracheophytes
- Clade: Angiosperms
- Clade: Eudicots
- Clade: Asterids
- Order: Ericales
- Family: Ericaceae
- Genus: Erica
- Species: E. fascicularis

Binomial name
- Erica fascicularis L.f.

Synonyms
- Erica coronata Andrews; Erica octophylla Thunb.; Erica radiiflora Salisb.; Euryloma imperialis G.Don; Syringodea coronata (Andrews) D.Don; Syringodea fascicularis G.Don

= Erica fascicularis =

Species of flowering plant

Erica fascicularis, the sticky heath, taaiheath, Tygerhoek heath and volstruis heath, is a plant belonging to the genus Erica and forming part of the fynbos. The species is endemic to the Western Cape.
