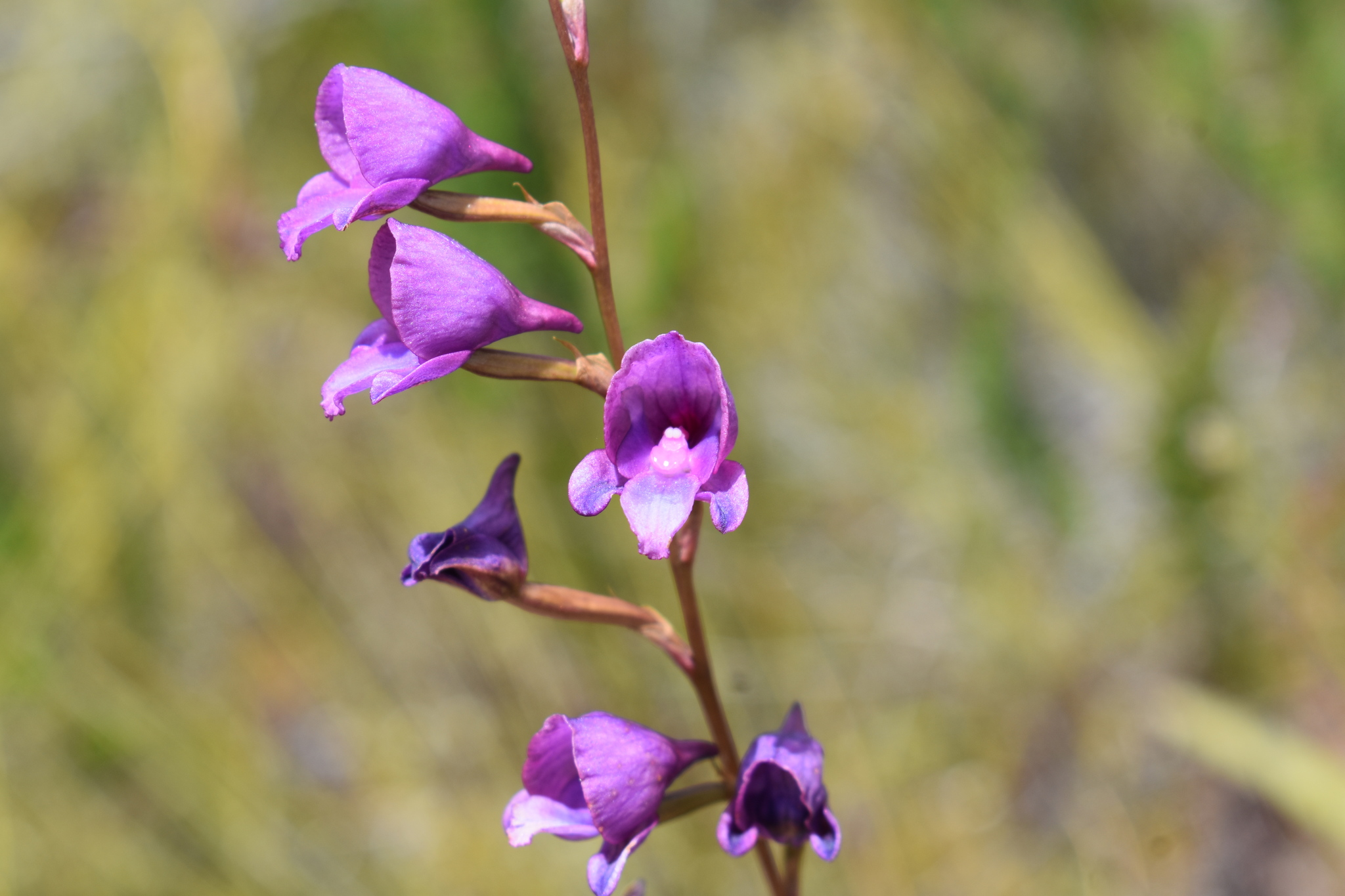

Scientific classification
- Kingdom: Plantae
- Clade: Tracheophytes
- Clade: Angiosperms
- Clade: Monocots
- Order: Asparagales
- Family: Orchidaceae
- Subfamily: Orchidoideae
- Genus: Disa
- Species: D. hians

Binomial name
- Disa hians (L.f.) Spreng.

Synonyms
- Disa lacera Sw.; Disa lacera var. multifida N.E.Br.; Disa outeniquensis Schltr.; Epidendrum hians (L.f.) Thunb.; Graphorkis hians (L.f.) Kuntze; Herschelia hians (L.f.) A.V.Hall; Herschelia lacera (Sw.) Fourc.; Herschelianthe hians (L.f.) Rauschert; Herschelianthe lacera (Sw.) Rauschert; Limodorum hians (L.f.) Thunb.; Satyrium hians L.f.

= Disa hians =

Species of flowering plant

Disa hians is a perennial plant and geophyte belonging to the genus Disa and is part of the fynbos. The plant is endemic to the Eastern Cape and Western Cape.
