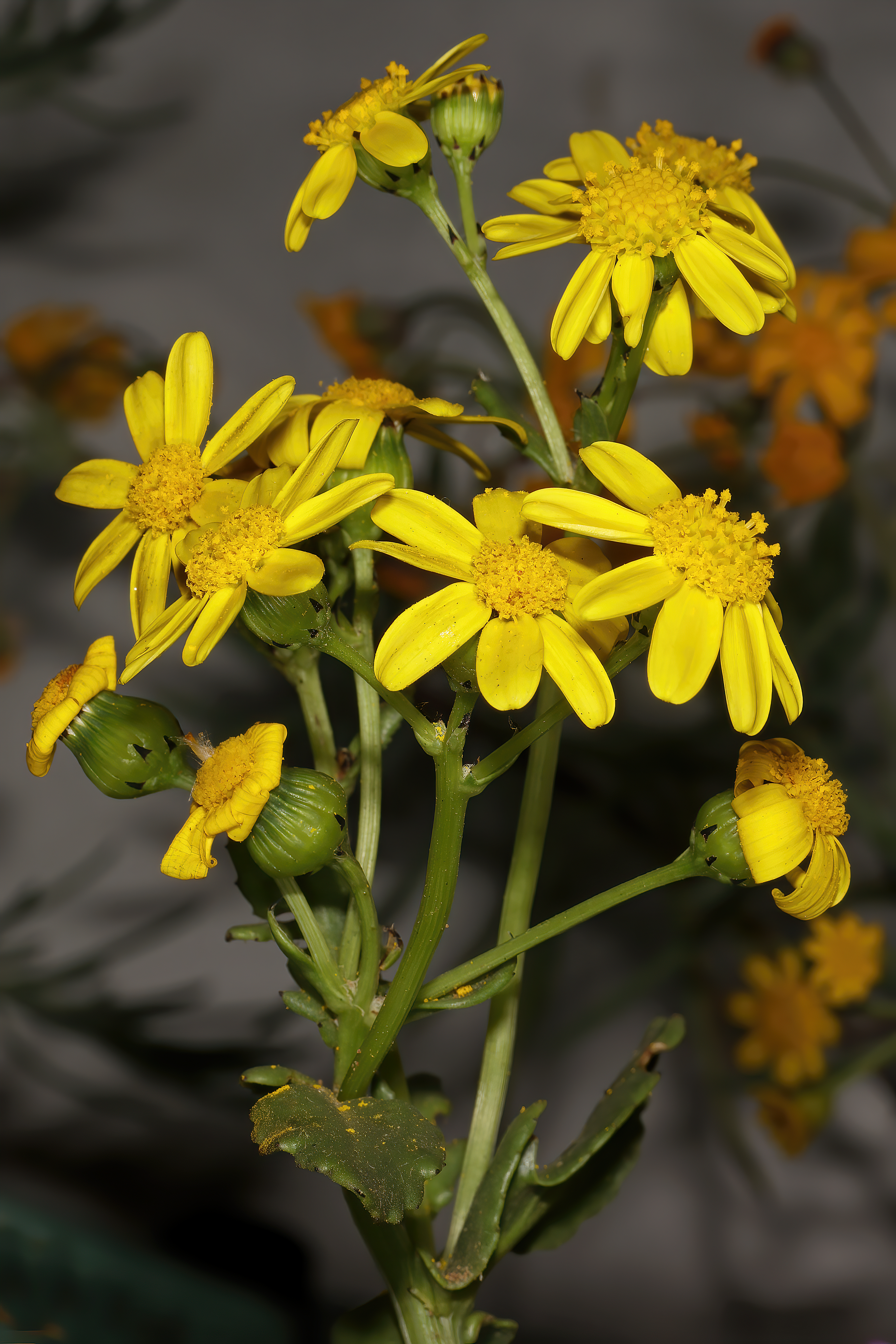

Scientific classification
- Kingdom: Plantae
- Clade: Tracheophytes
- Clade: Angiosperms
- Clade: Eudicots
- Clade: Asterids
- Order: Asterales
- Family: Asteraceae
- Genus: Senecio
- Species: S. maritimus

Binomial name
- Senecio maritimus L.f.

Synonyms
- Senecio telephifolius Jacq.

= Senecio maritimus =

Species of plant

Senecio maritimus is a species of flowering plant in the family Asteraceae, native to the Cape Provinces. It was first described by Carl Linnaeus the Younger in 1782.
