= Elisabeth Christina von Linné =

Swedish botanist

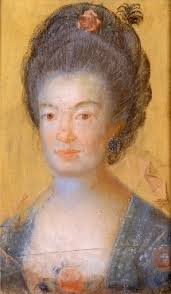
- Elisabeth Christina von Linné, painted by Sven Nikolaus Höök
- Born: June 14, 1743
- Died: April 15, 1782 (age 39)
- Notable work: Om Indiska Krassens Blickande (Concerning the flickering of the Indian crass)
- Spouse: Carl Fredrik Bergencrantz
- Children: Carl Fredrik; Sara Elisabeth
- Parents: Carl von Linné (father); Sara Elisabeth Moræa (mother)
- Family: Linné family

Elisabeth Christina von Linné (June 14, 1743 – April 15, 1782) was a Swedish botanist, daughter of Carl Linnaeus and Sara Elisabeth Moræa.

== Life ==
There is no direct information about the education of Elisabeth Christina von Linné, as it is not clearly mentioned anywhere. However, as her brother was given home tuition in preparation for university studies, and she is confirmed to have socialized with the students of her father, who were also tutored in the family home, it is seen as likely that she was given home tuition by the same teachers as her brother and her father's students, perhaps also with them, which was not uncommon in Sweden at the time.

She was acquainted with several of her father's students, among them Erik Gustaf Lidbeck and Daniel Solander, the latter of whom she reportedly wished to marry, but as he did not return from his expedition, the marriage never took place.

Linné married major Carl Fredrik Bergencrantz in 1764 and had two children. However, she left her husband and moved back with her parents a couple of years after her wedding because she had been subjected to spousal abuse: she died at the age of 39, and her children also died before adulthood. Her mother blamed her early death upon the abuse she had been subjected to while married.

=== Scientific activity ===
Linné is referred to as the first female botanist in Sweden in a modern sense, despite not having received any formal education. It was she who first described the optic phenomenon in which the Tropaeolum majus appears to send out small bursts of lightning, now named the Elizabeth Linnæus Phenomenon (or, in German, Das Elisabeth-Linné-Phänomen) after her.

She published her observations on the topic in a paper for the Royal Swedish Academy of Sciences in 1762, aged 19. The paper is called Om indianska krassens blickande ("Concerning the flickering of the Indian crass"). This paper came to the notice of the English doctor, scientist and poet, Erasmus Darwin. He included a reference to it in his "The botanic garden, part II, containing the loves of the plants" (1789) in which he also reported a confirmation of the phenomenon by M. Haggren, a lecturer in natural history who had published his findings in Paris in 1788.

The poets William Wordsworth and Samuel Taylor Coleridge read Darwin's accounts early in their careers and, influenced by these accounts, they referred to flashing flowers in their poems, Wordsworth in "I wandered lonely as a cloud" also called "Daffodils" ('They flash upon that inward eye') and Coleridge in his "Lines Written At Shurton Bars..." ('Flashes the golden-coloured flower / A fair electric flame'). Thus Elizabeth Linnaeus came, through Darwin, to influence the pioneers of English Romantic poetry.
