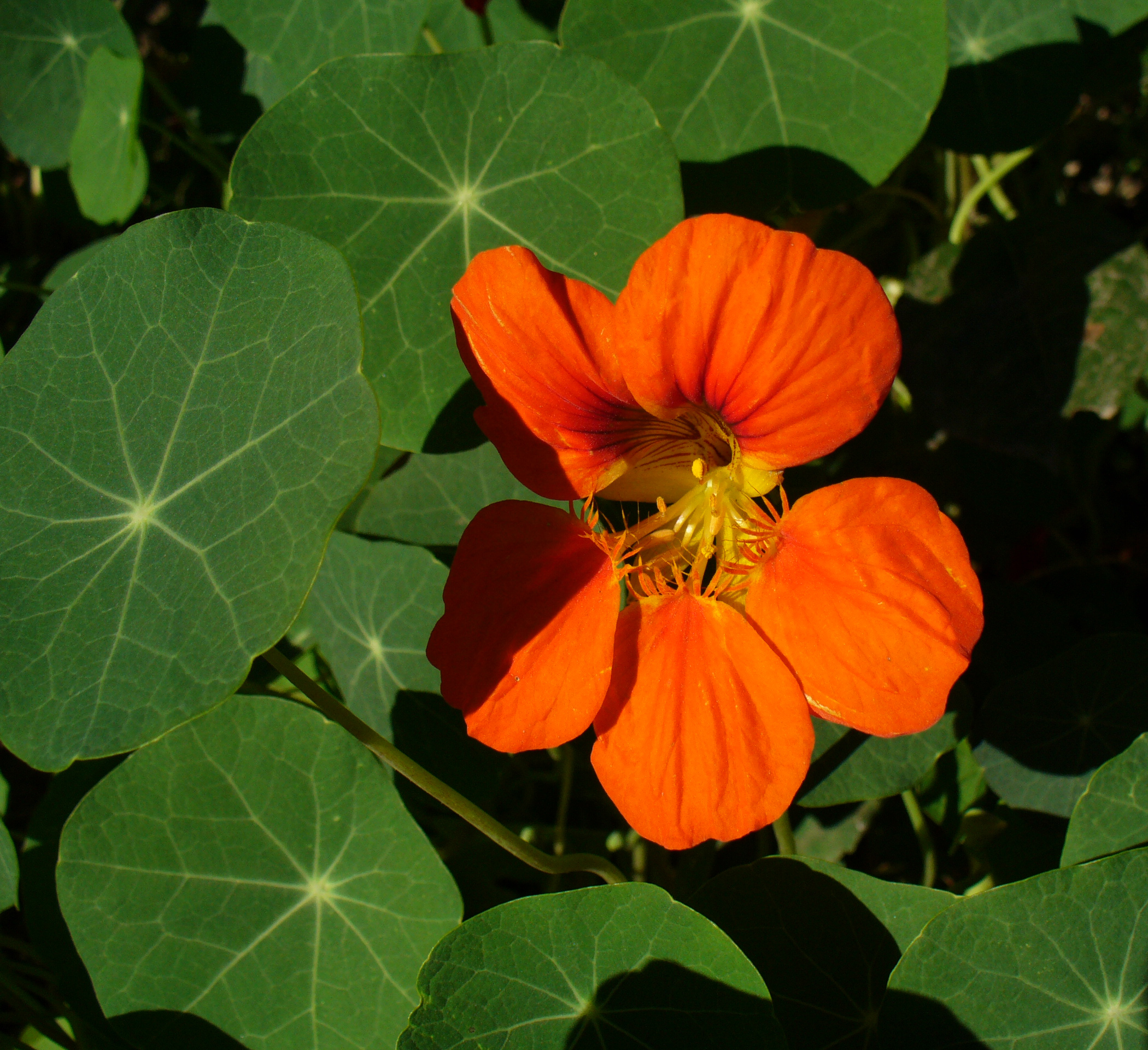

Scientific classification
- Kingdom: Plantae
- Clade: Tracheophytes
- Clade: Angiosperms
- Clade: Eudicots
- Clade: Rosids
- Order: Brassicales
- Family: Tropaeolaceae
- Genus: Tropaeolum
- Species: T. majus

Binomial name
- Tropaeolum majus L.

Synonyms
- Cardamindum majus (L.) Moench; Nasturtium indicum Garsault; Tropaeolum elatum Salisb.; Tropaeolum hortense Sparre; Tropaeolum hybridum L.; Tropaeolum pinnatum Andrews; Tropaeolum quinquelobum Bergius; Trophaeum majus (L.) Kuntze

= Tropaeolum majus =

Species of flowering plant

Tropaeolum majus, the garden nasturtium, nasturtium, Indian cress or monk's cress, is a species of flowering plant in the family Tropaeolaceae. An annual or a short-lived perennial with disc-shaped leaves and brilliant yellow, orange or red flowers, it is of cultivated, probably hybrid origin. It is not closely related to the genus Nasturtium (which includes watercress).

== Description ==
It is a fast-growing plant, either annual or perennial, with trailing stems growing to 0.9–1.8 m (3–6 ft). The leaves are large, nearly circular, 3 to 15 cm (1 to 6 in) in diameter, green to glaucous green above, paler below; they are peltate, with the 5–30-cm-long petiole near the middle of the leaf, with several veins radiating to the smoothly rounded or slightly lobed margin.

The flowers are 2.5–6 cm in diameter, mildly scented, with five petals, eight stamens, and a 2.5–3-cm-long nectar spur at the rear. The petals vary from yellow to orange to red, frilled and often darker at the base. The fruit is 2 cm broad, three-segmented, each segment with a single large seed 1–1.5 cm long.

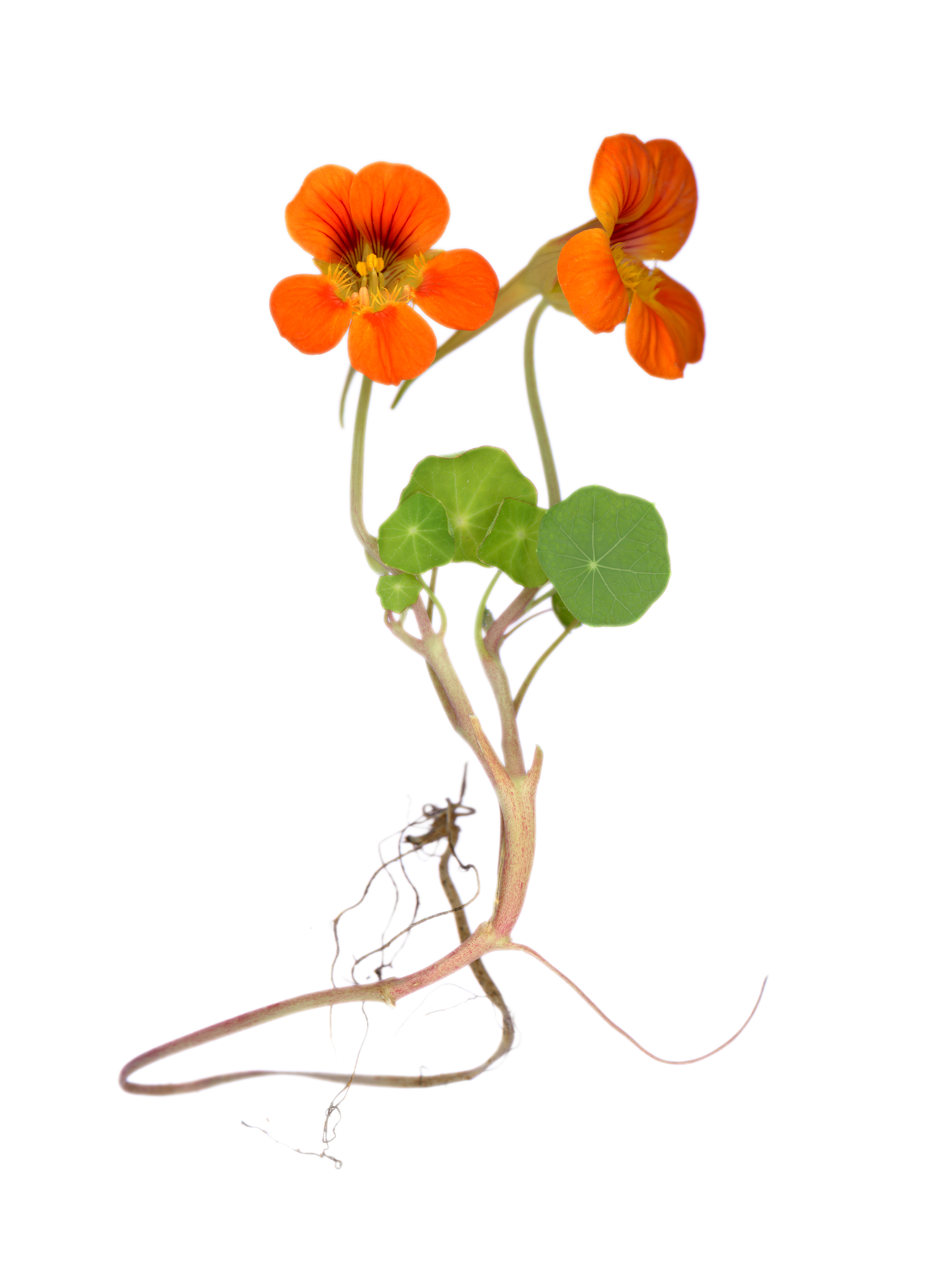
Botanical scan

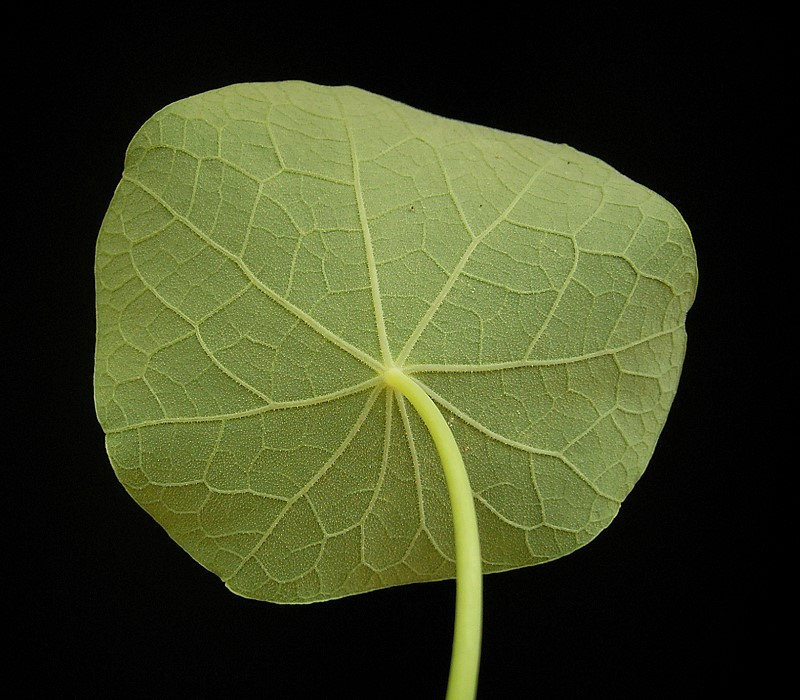
Underside of leaf

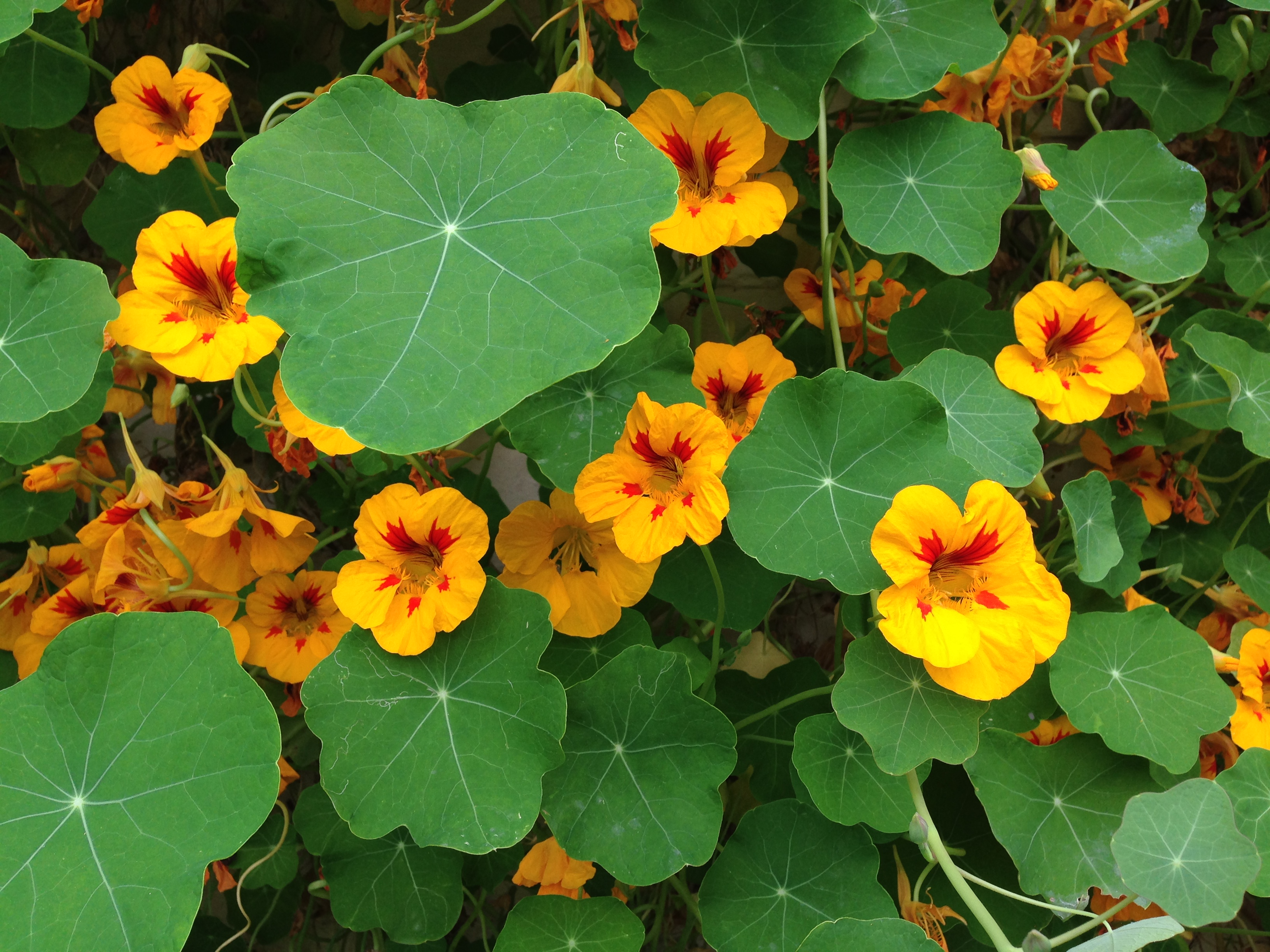
Leaves and flowers

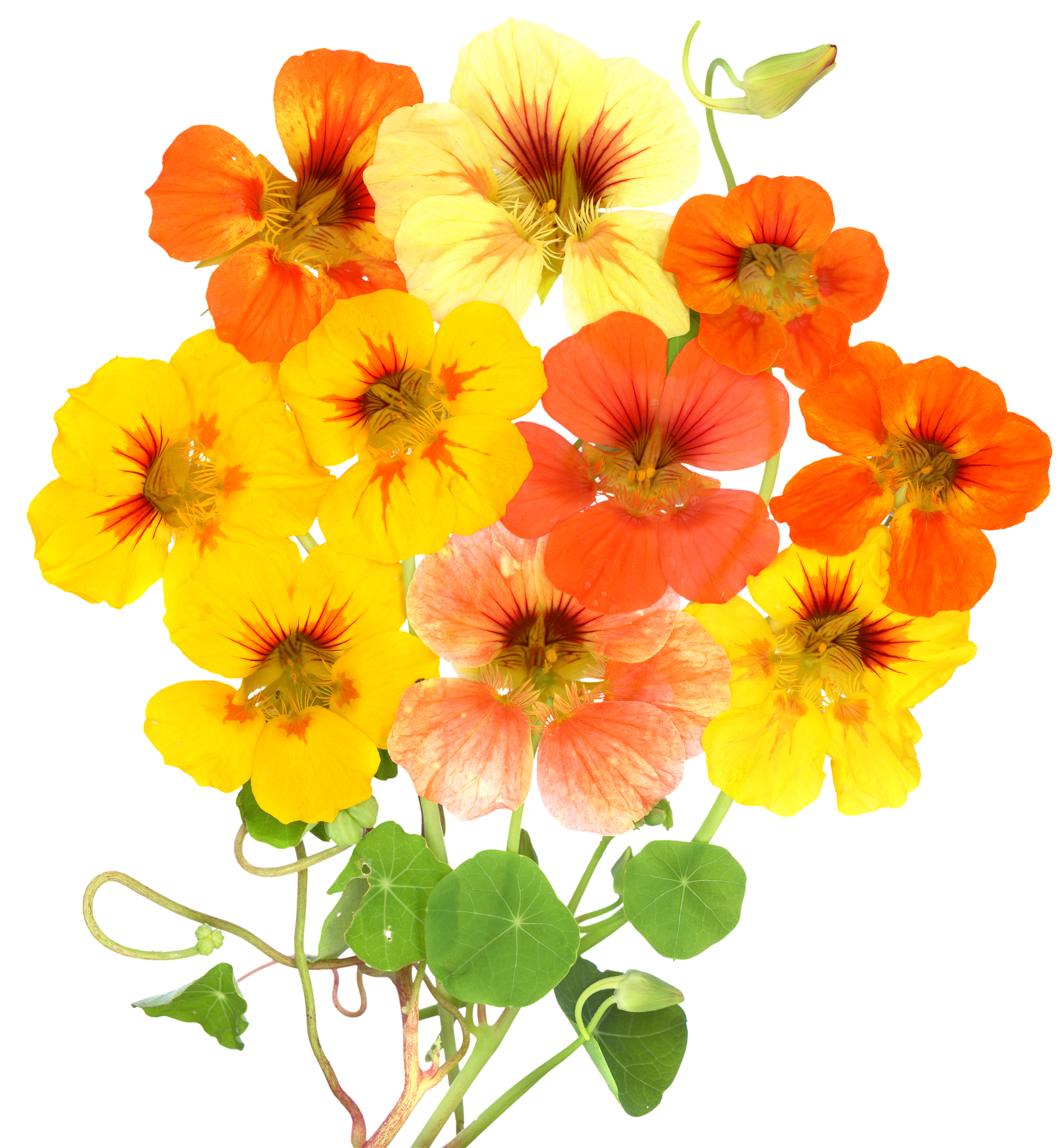
Some colour varieties

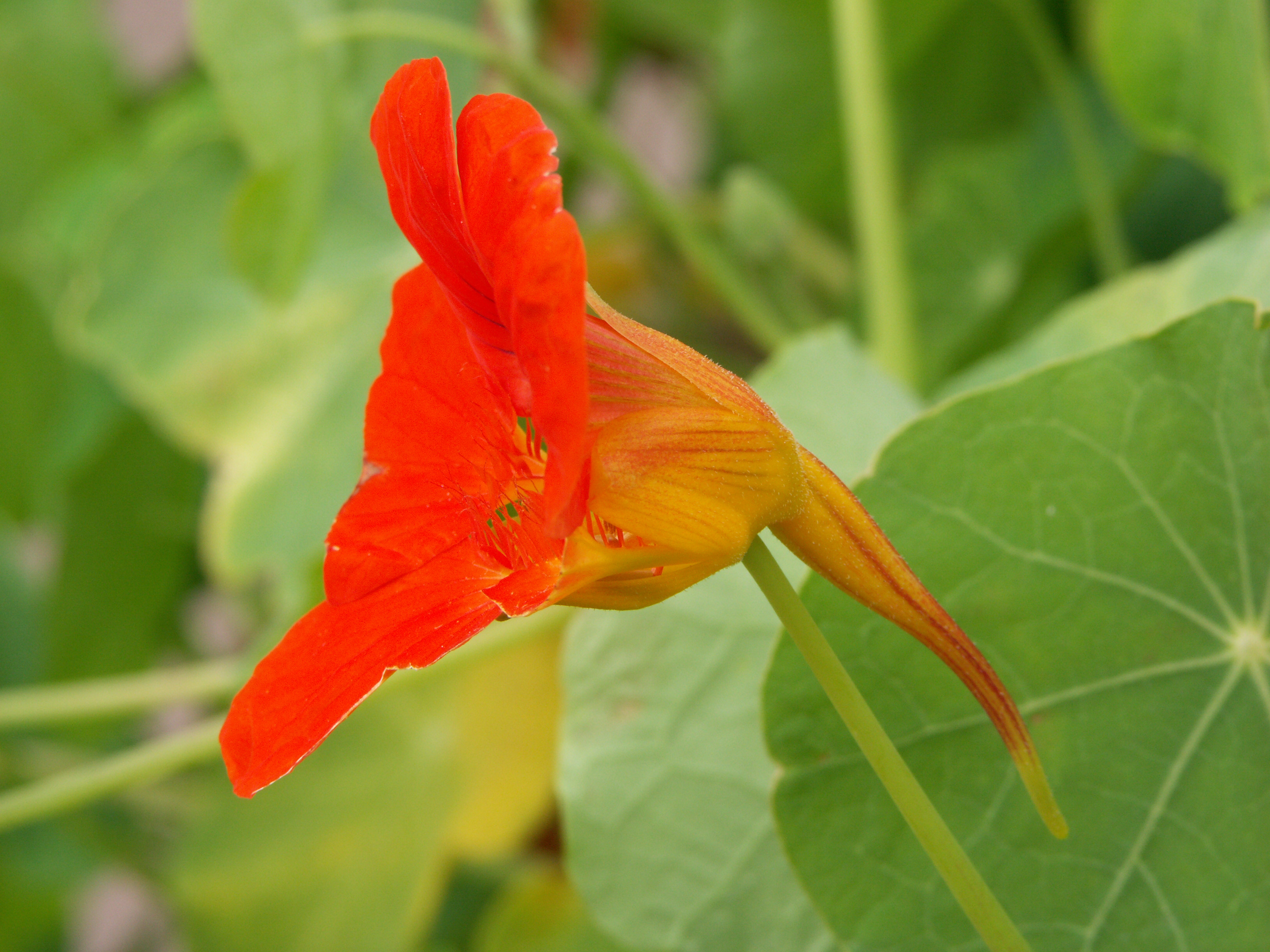
Flower showing nectar spur

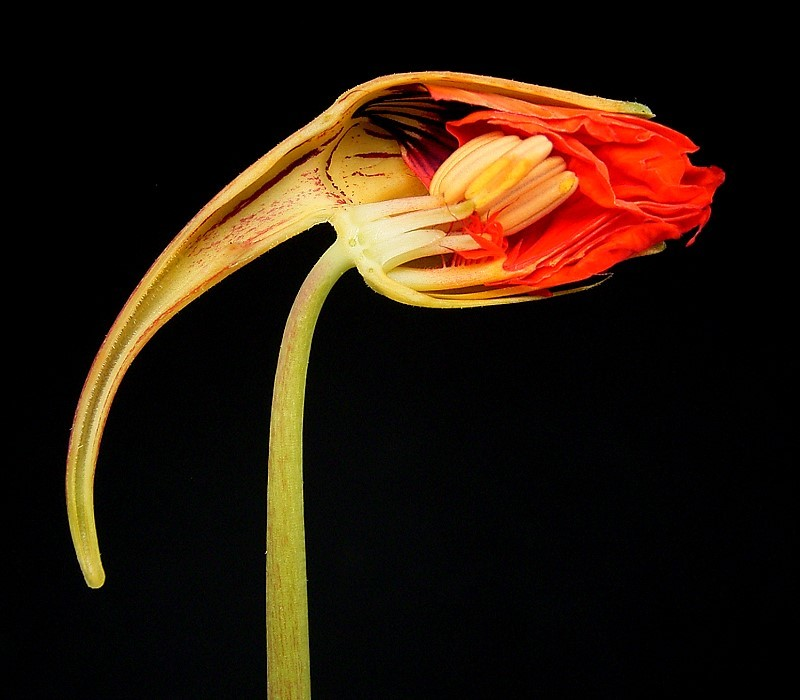
Flower cut through to show structure

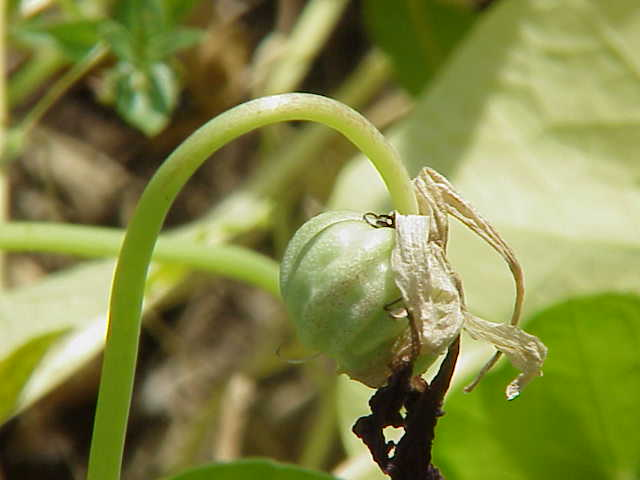
Immature fruit

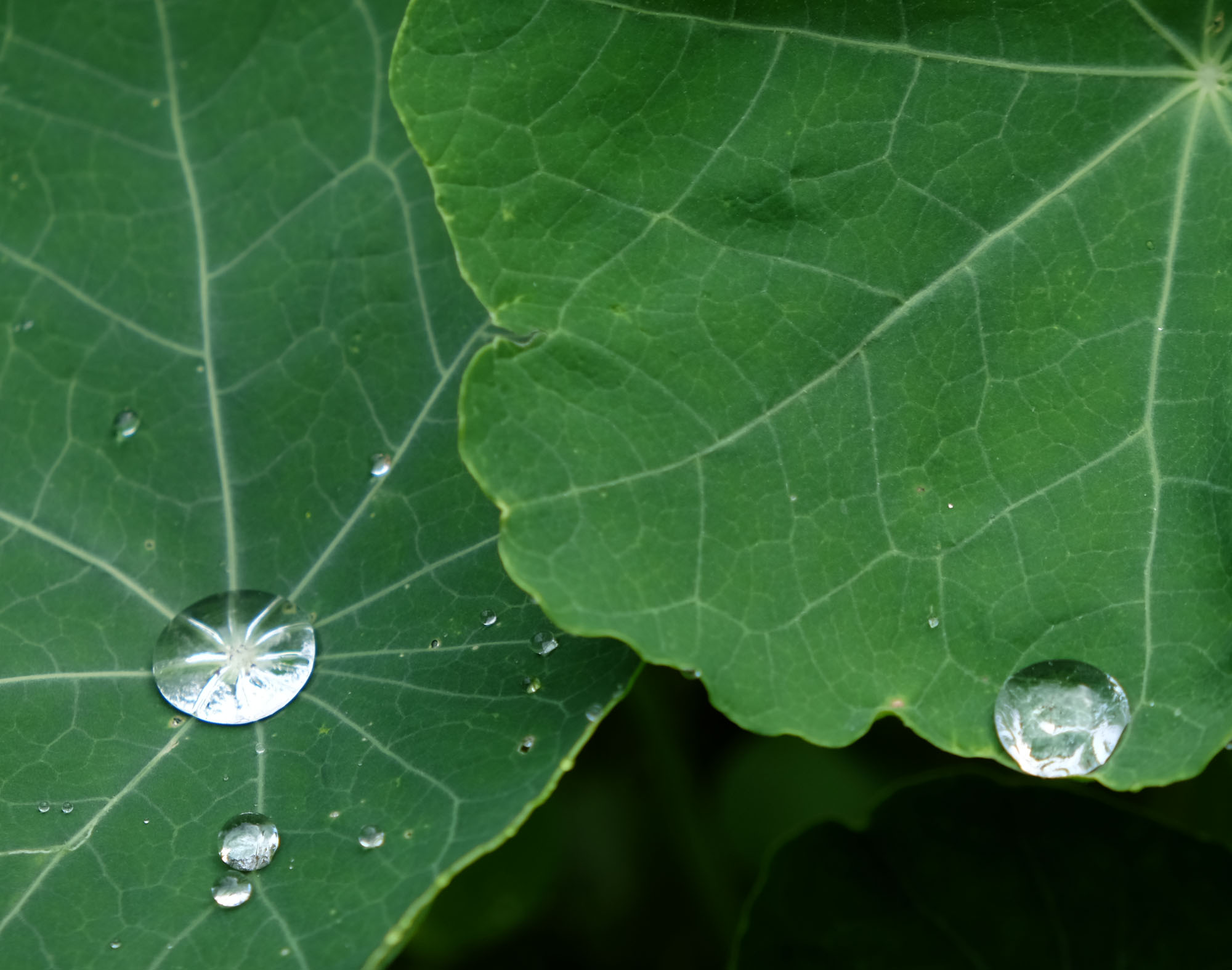
Nasturtium leaves with lotus effect

=== Unique effects ===
Nasturtium leaves, like some other species, demonstrate the lotus effect, whereby rainwater falling on the surface gathers into globular droplets which roll off the leaf, leaving it dry and clean.

Das Elisabeth Linné-Phänomen (the Elizabeth Linnæus Phenomenon), named after Carl Linnaeus's daughter Elisabeth Christina von Linné (who discovered the phenomenon at age 19), refers to the appearance of 'flashing' flowers. Especially at dusk, the orange flowers may appear to emit small flashes. Once believed to be an electrical effect, it is today thought to be an optical reaction in the human eye caused by the contrast between the orange flowers and the surrounding green.

== Etymology ==
The species was originally called Nasturtium indicum ("Indian nasturtium") but the plant is not related to the true Nasturtium genus.

The current genus name Tropaeolum, coined by Linnaeus, means "little trophy". Tropaeolum is the diminutive form of the Latin tropaeum, itself borrowed from Ancient Greek τρόπαιον (trópaion, "trophy").

The Latin specific epithet majus means "larger" (the neuter form of major).

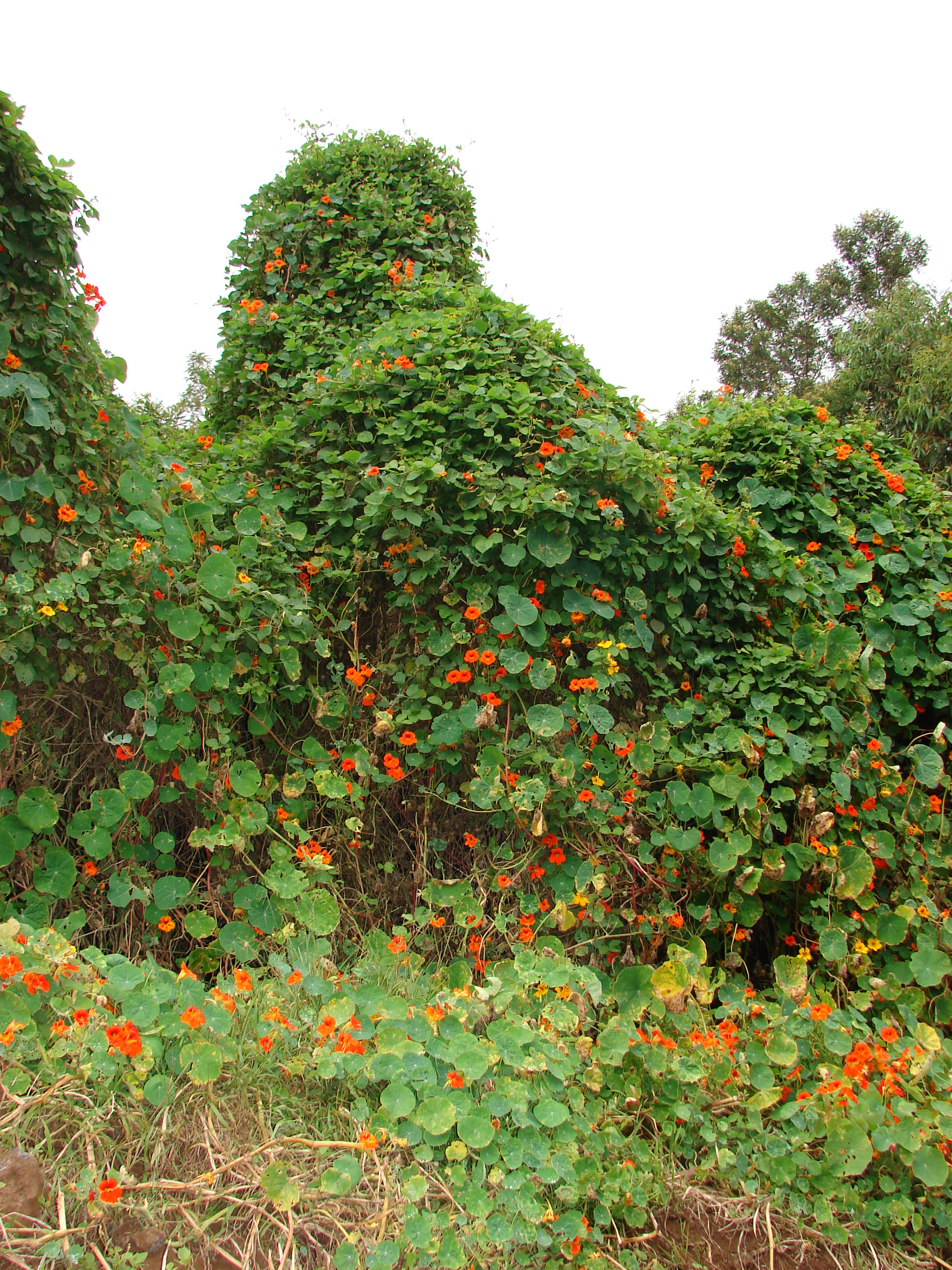
Climbing habit

== Distribution and habitat ==
The species is of cultivated, probably hybrid origin. It originated in the Andes from Bolivia north to Colombia.

The species has become naturalized in parts of the United States (California, New York, Pennsylvania, New Hampshire, Massachusetts, Connecticut and Virginia), as well as parts of Europe and Asia, Africa and Australia. It is listed as invasive in Hawaii and Lord Howe Island, Australia.

== Ecology ==
The garden nasturtium is used as a food plant by the larvae of some lepidopteran species including the dot moth, the garden carpet moth and the large white or cabbage white butterfly.

== Cultivation ==
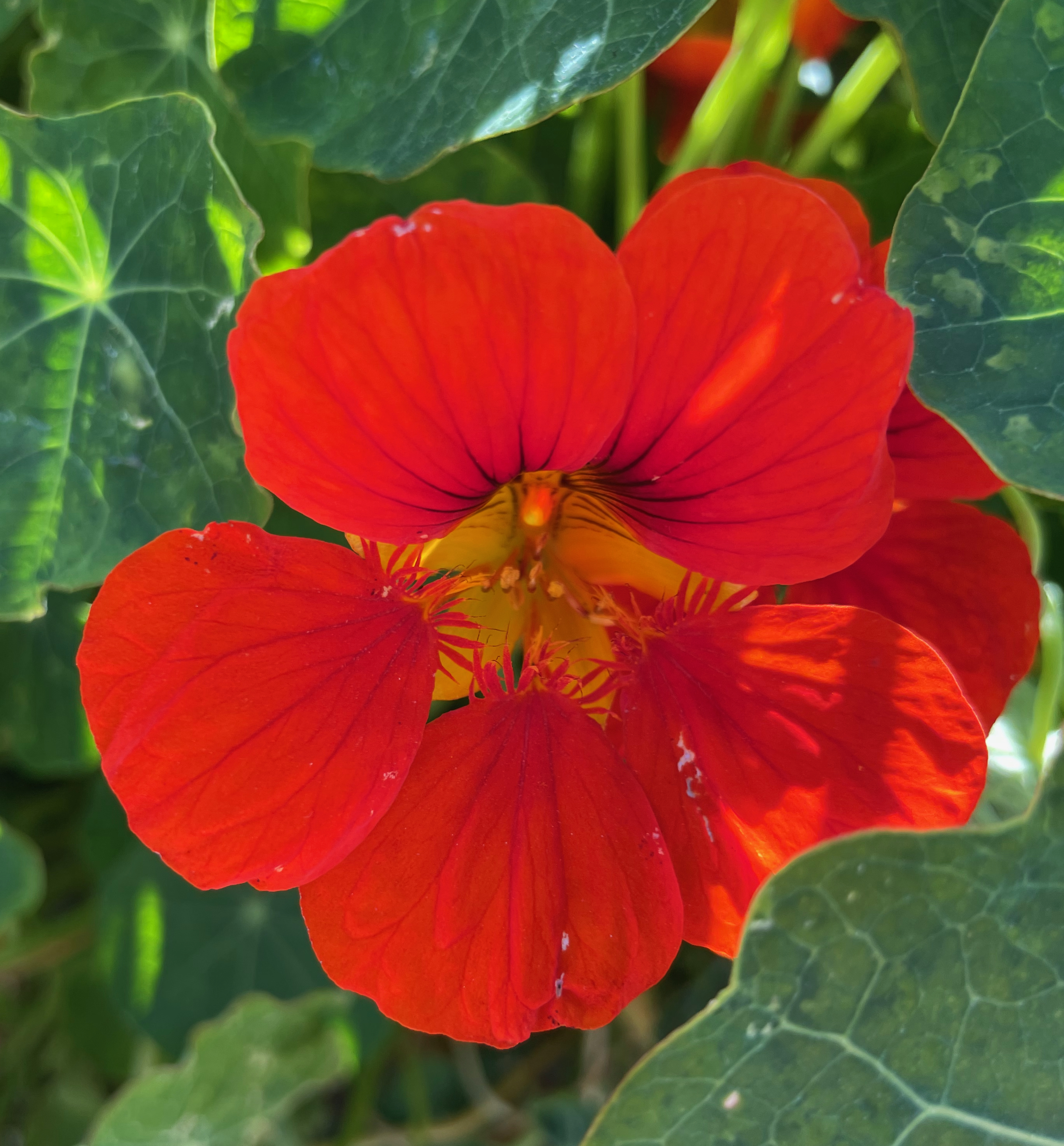
Garden specimen in Cayucos, California

Tropaeolum majus cultivars are widely grown as easy annual plants, and will grow in poor, damp soil in full sun. The large seeds are easy to handle individually.

As they do not tolerate heavy frost, in cooler climates they are best sown under glass in heat, and planted out after all danger of frost has passed. Alternatively, as they are fast-growing, they may be sown in situ after that time.

Many flower colours are available, in the warm spectrum from cream through yellow, orange, red and maroon. Some have highly decorative marbling on the leaves.

The groups Whirlybird Series and Alaska Series have gained the Royal Horticultural Society's Award of Garden Merit.

== Uses ==
All of the above-ground parts of the plants are edible. The flower has most often been consumed, making for an especially ornamental salad ingredient; it has a slightly peppery taste reminiscent of watercress, and is also used in stir fry. The flowers contain about 130 milligrams (0.0046 oz) vitamin C per 100 g (3 1/2 oz), about the same amount as is contained in parsley. Moreover, they contain up to 45 milligrams (0.0016 oz) of lutein per 100 grams (3.5 oz). The unripe seed pods can be harvested and dropped into spiced vinegar to become a condiment and garnish, sometimes used in place of capers.

Some native South Americans used the plant medicinally, apparently due to its antibiotic (including antibacterial) properties. Some Europeans ate it to treat urinary and genital infections.

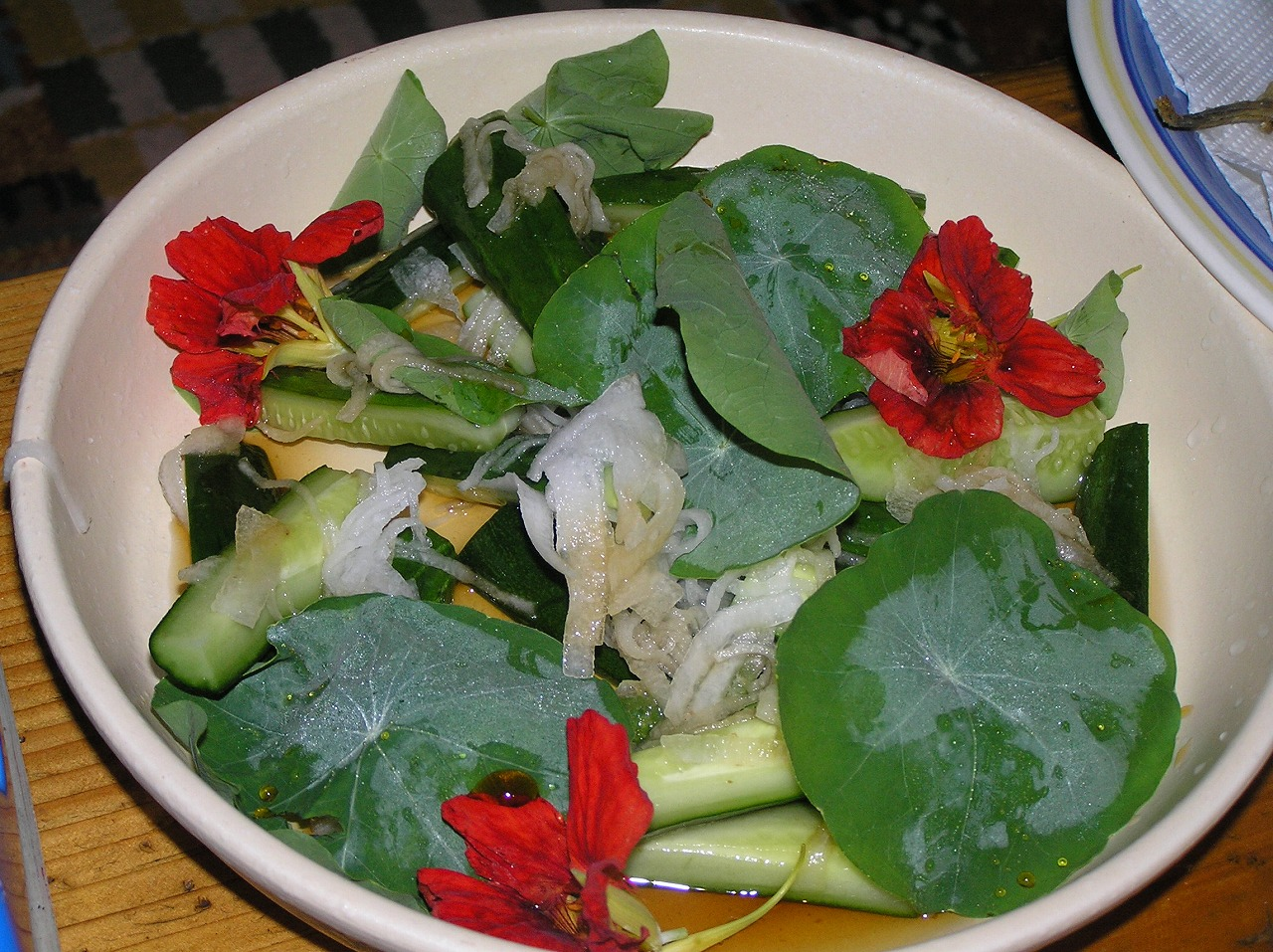
Salad with flowers and leaves

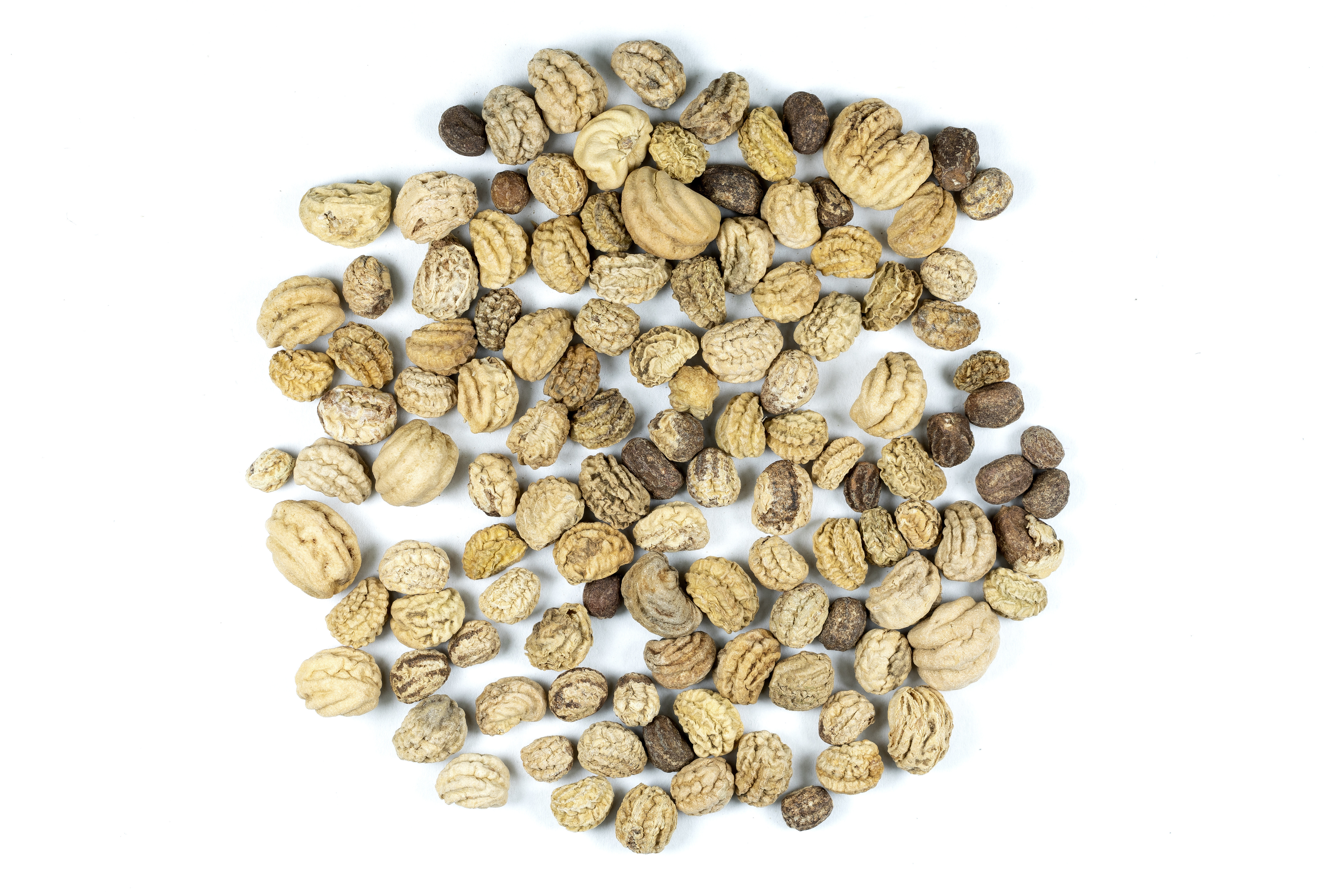
Seed pods
