= Linné family =

Swedish noble family

von Linné Linnaeus
- Swedish noble family
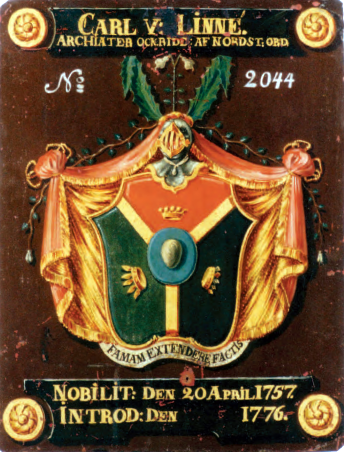
- Coat of arms of the House of von Linné

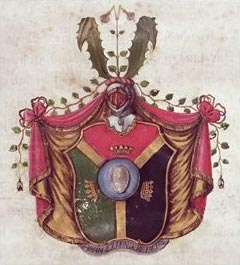
- Country: Sweden
- Origin: Småland, Sweden
- Founded: Ennoblement 20 April 1757; Introduction 1776
- Founder: Carl Linnaeus
- Connected members: Bergencrantz, Duse
- Motto: FAMAM EXTENDERE FACTIS
- Estate: Linnaeus's Hammarby

The von Linné family and Linnaeus family was the family of the renowned botanist, zoologist, taxonomist, physician and formalizer of the binomial nomenclature, Carl Linnaeus, and a Swedish noble family (No. 2044), ennobled on 20 April 1757 by the Swedish King Adolf Frederick, introduced at the House of Nobility in 1776.

The von Linné family is predominantly famous for its contributions in the fields of science. The von Linné family descends from generations of priests and peasants in the historical province of Småland. The noble family's coat of arms prominently features a twinflower, one of Linnaeus's favourite plants.

== Family tree ==
- Nils Linnaeus (1674–1748) ⚭ Christina Brodersonia (1688–1733)
  - Carl Linnaeus (1707–1778) ⚭ Sara Elisabeth Moræa (1716–1806)
    - Carl Linnaeus the Younger (1741–1783)
    - Elisabeth Christina von Linné (1743–1782)
    - Sara Christina von Linné (1751–1835)
