= James Edward Smith (botanist) =

English botanist (1759–1828)

Sir James Edward Smith
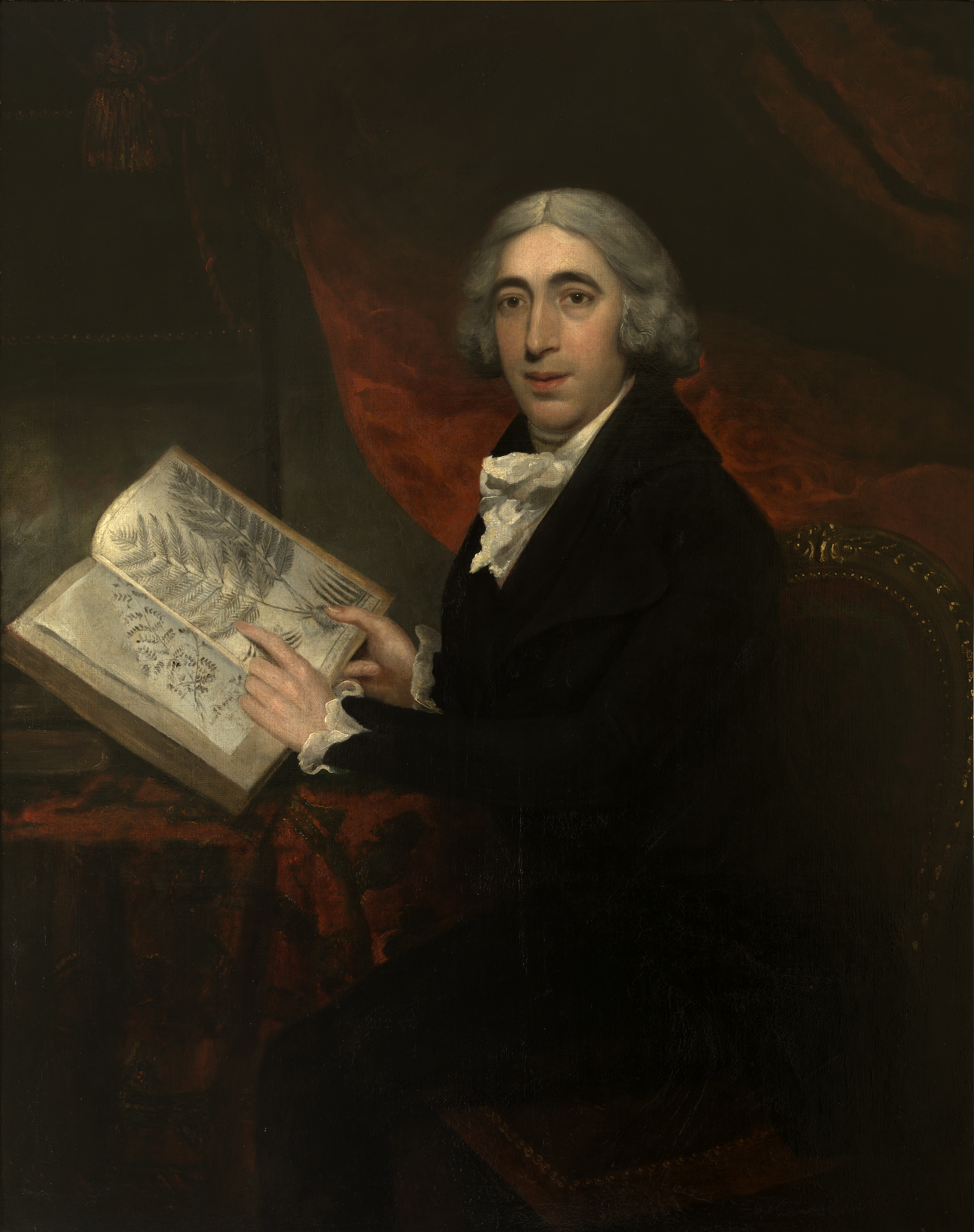
- Portrait of Sir James Edward Smith
- Born: 2 December 1759; Norwich, England
- Died: 17 March 1828 (aged 68); Norwich, England
- Education: University of Edinburgh
- Scientific career
- Fields: Botany
- Workplaces: Royal Swedish Academy of Sciences
- Academic advisors: Joseph Black; John Walker
- Author abbrev. (botany): Sm.

Sir James Edward Smith (2 December 1759 – 17 March 1828) was an English botanist and founder of the Linnean Society.

== Early life and education ==
Smith was born in Norwich in 1759, the son of a wealthy wool merchant. He started studying botanical science when he was eighteen. In 1781 he enrolled in the medical course at the University of Edinburgh, where he studied chemistry under Joseph Black, natural history under John Walker, and botany under John Hope, an early teacher of Linnaean taxonomy. He moved to London in 1783 to continue his studies and became a friend of Sir Joseph Banks, who was offered the entire collection of books, manuscripts and specimens of the Swedish natural historian and botanist Carl Linnaeus following the death of his son Carolus Linnaeus the Younger. Banks declined the purchase, but Smith borrowed money from his father and bought the collection for the price of £1,000 in 1784. Smith was elected a Fellow of the Royal Society in 1785.

== Academic career ==
Between 1786 and 1788, Smith made the grand tour through the Netherlands, France, Italy and Switzerland visiting botanists, picture galleries and herbaria. He founded the Linnean Society of London in 1788, becoming its first President, a post he held until his death. He returned to live in Norwich in 1796 bringing with him the entire Linnean Collection. His library and botanical collections acquired European fame and was visited by numerous entomologists and botanists from all over the Continent. In 1792, he was elected a foreign member of the Royal Swedish Academy of Sciences.

In 1796, he was elected a member of the American Philosophical Society.

Smith spent the remaining thirty years of his life writing books and articles on botany. His books included Flora Britannica and The English Flora (4 volumes, 1824–1828). He contributed 3,348 botanical articles to Rees's Cyclopædia between 1808 and 1819, following the death of Rev. William Wood, who had started the work. In addition, he contributed 57 biographies of botanists.

He contributed seven volumes to the major botanical publication of the eighteenth century, Flora Graeca, the publications begun by John Sibthorp. A fruitful collaboration was found through descriptions Smith supplied to publisher and illustrator, James Sowerby with whom he subsequently developed as passionate interest in mosses and lichens. Depiction of flora in England had previously only found patronage for aesthetic concerns, but an interest in gardening and natural history saw illustrated publications, such as the exotic A Specimen of the Botany of New Holland and James Sowerby's 36-volume English Botany, reach new audiences.

In 1797, Smith published The Natural History of the Rarer Lepidopterous Insects of Georgia, the earliest book on North American insects. It included the illustrations and notes of John Abbot, with descriptions of new species by Smith based on Abbot's drawings.

Smith's friendship with William Roscoe (after whom he named the genus Roscoea) saw him contribute 5000 plants, between 1806 and 1817, to supplement the Roylean Herbarium. This was to become the Smith Herbarium held by the Liverpool Botanical Garden.

== Personal life and death ==
Smith died at his Norwich home in Surrey Street on 17 March 1828, aged 68. After his death the Linnean Collection, together with Smith's own collections, were bought by the Linnean Society for £3,000.

He was married in 1796 to Pleasance Reeve, who survived him by 49 years and edited his memoirs and correspondence. They are buried together at St Margaret's, Lowestoft. His niece, Frances Catherine Barnard (1796–1869), was an author.

== Eponymy ==
The leguminous genus Smithia and the Himalayan spruce, Picea smithiana, are named after him.

== Works ==
- Icones pictae plantarum rariorum descriptionibus et observationibus illustratae. London, 1790–93
- Linnaeus, Carl von, Disquisitio de sexu plantarum. (1786) – (English) A dissertation on the sexes of plants translated from the Latin of Linnaeus by James Edward Smith. London : Printed for the author, and sold by George Nicol ..., (book details: xv, [1], 62, [2] p.; 22 cm. (8vo))
- "Tentamen Botanicum de Filicum Generibus Dorsiferarum", Mém. Acad. Roy. Sci. Turin, vol. 5 (1793) 401–422; one of the earliest scientific papers on fern taxonomy Available online on Project Gutenberg.
- English Botany: Or, Coloured Figures of British Plants, with their Essential Characters, Synonyms and Places of Growth, descriptions supplied by Smith, was issued as a part work over 23 years until its completion in 1813. This work was issued in 36 volumes with 2,592 hand-coloured plates of British plants. Published and illustrated by James Sowerby.
- Linné, Carl von, Lachesis Lapponica or A Tour in Lapland, Translated by James Edward Smith (1811). London: White and Cochrane In two volumes (Volume 1; Volume 2).
- Tracts Relating to Natural History: published in London in 1798. A collection of essays concerning Linnaeus and botany.

== See also ==
- Category:Taxa named by James Edward Smith (botanist)
