= Pleasence =

Pleasence is a surname. Notable people with the surname include:

- Angela Pleasence (1941–2026), British actress
- Donald Pleasence (1919–1995), British actor

== See also ==
- Pleasance (disambiguation)
