= Pleasance Smith =

English writer and literary editor (1773–1877)

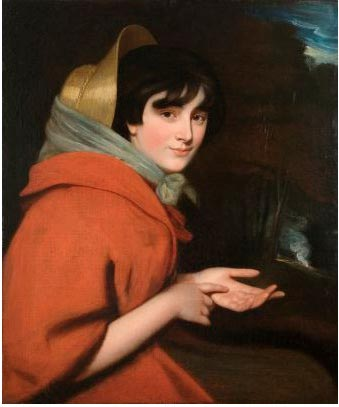
- "as a gypsy" by John Opie
- Born: Pleasance Reeve; 11 May 1773; Lowestoft, Suffolk, England
- Died: 3 February 1877 (aged 103); Lowestoft, Suffolk, England
- Known for: correspondence, being a 19th century centenarian
- Title: Lady
- Spouse: Sir James Edward Smith

Pleasance Smith (née Reeve; 11 May 1773 – 3 February 1877) was an English letter writer, literary editor, and centenarian. Smith lived to the age of 103, becoming well known in later life on account of her advanced years.

== Life ==
Smith was born in Lowestoft, Suffolk in 1773, the fifth child of attorney Robert Reeve and Pleasance (née Clerke). It was said that as a child, Pleasance was 'trained by both her parents to a love of nature and of literature', as well as having an 'innate' love of poetry. In 1796, she married James Edward Smith (1759–1828), founder of the Linnean Society. The couple moved to 29 Surrey Street, Norwich, into a grand Georgian house given to them by Pleasance's father, which became a 'private museum' housing Smith's extensive collections.

The year after her marriage, Pleasance Smith was painted "as a gypsy" by Cornish artist John Opie. She was acknowledged for her beauty, with William Roscoe writing in 1804 that ‘he who could see and hear Mrs. Smith without being enchanted has a heart not worth a farthing.’ Pleasance outlived James Edward Smith by nearly five decades, maintaining a wide circle of friends and correspondents, with whom she discussed matters of science, art, religion, the humanities, and the natural world.

Following the death of her husband in 1828, Smith edited his memoirs and some of his letters, a work published in 1832. That year, Smith returned to Lowestoft.

Smith became 'known for her generosity and philanthropic work', as well as for giving advice 'freely on matters as diverse as religious questions and new knitting patterns'. On reaching 99, she received a letter from her great-niece Alice Pleasance Liddell, the child immortalised in Lewis Carroll's Alice's Adventures in Wonderland. On her hundredth birthday in 1873, a dinner was given in the Public Hall, Lowestoft, for the aged poor of the neighbourhood, and she received from the queen a copy of ‘Our Life in the Highlands,’ with the autograph inscription: ‘To Lady Smith, on her 100th birthday, from her friend Victoria R., May 11th, 1873.’

A prolific letter writer throughout her life, Smith continued to write almost to her death, even as her eyesight began to fail. In 1873 she wrote:

I can yet see the landscape. This is a great alleviation, but I cannot see the lines I attempt to write.

She retained her hearing, and her memory remained 'singularly accurate and tenacious'. It was said too that she 'never lost her interest in political and literary topics, or her sympathy with modern movements', 'did not think the past age better than the present, and met fears of the dangerous tendencies of modern science with the remark, ‘I am for inquiry.’'

== Death ==
Pleasance Smith died at home on 3 February 1877, and buried beside her husband at St. Margaret's Church, Lowestoft. On the day of her funeral, shops were closed and people lined the streets leading from the church.
