= Simon Pleasance =

Simon Pleasance (born 1944) is an Anglo-French art translator and writer. He was educated at St. Edward’s School, then Keble College., Oxford. He is a longtime resident of southern Languedoc, France, and President of the environmental watchdog Observatoire des Paysages Audois. He has previously taught at the Istituto Britannico, Florence, 1966–1967 and worked with Fay Stender’s [RIP] Prison Law Project, Oakland, California, 1971–1973.

== Publications ==
=== Original work ===
- Pleasance, Simon, et al. The Grimani Breviary: Reproduced from the Illuminated Manuscript Belonging to the Biblioteca Marciana, Venice. Translated from the Italian Breviario Grimani by Linda Packer. . Delray Beach, Fla: Levenger Press, 2007. ISBN 978-1-929154-29-6
- Pleasance, Simon, and Fronza Woods., eds. Portraits of Love: Great Romances of the 20th Century. New York: Filipacchi Pub, 2002.Originally published in France by Editions Filipacchi, Société Sonodip, Paris Match. ISBN 978-2-85018-724-7
- Pleasance, Simon. Marc, Macke Und Delaunay The Beauty of a Fragile World (1910–1914); [on the Occasion of the Exhibition Marc, Macke and Delaunay - the Beauty of a Fragile World (1910–1914), Sprengel-Museum Hannover, 29. March - 19. July 2009]. Hannover: Sprengel-Museum, 2009. ISBN 978-3-89169-209-7
- Pleasance, Simon, and Fronza Woods. Charming hotels around the world. Elle decor guide. New York, N.Y.: Filipacchi Pub, 2003. ISBN 978-2-85018-629-5
- Pleasance, Simon. Claude Lévêque, Herr monde: exposition, [Thiers, le Creux de l'Enfer], 11 juin-17 septembre 2000. Thiers (Vallée des Usines, 63300): le Creux de l'enfer, 2000.

Numerous art and other publications include studies on Christian Boltanski, Sophie Calle, Jeff Koons, Annette Messager, Claude Monet, François Morellet, Aurélie Nemours, Fernando Pessoa, Erik Satie, and Jean Tinguely; scores of catalogues from Alberti and Albers via Calder, Cocteau, Duchamp, Giacometti, the GRAV, Lichtenstein, Magritte, Miró, Smithson and Soutine to Wéry and Wines; collaborations with leading art critics and historians; and most recently major monographs on Futurism (Rome, Paris, London), and Leonardo da Vinci (Chât. Clos Lucé, Amboise).

=== Translations ===
- France. Ministère de l'agriculture et de la pêche. La forêt et les industries du bois 2006: données disponibles au 1er septembre 2005.: Forests and the wood and timber industries 2006 : data available as of 1 February 2005 Paris: SCEES, 2006. French text and English translation by Simon Pleasance ISBN 978-2-11-095957-7 (also earlier years, 2000)
- Guy Tosatto. Jörg Sasse: tableaux & esquisses; [l'Exposition "Jörg Sasse, Tableaux & Esquisses" est présentée au Musée de Grenoble du 20 novembre 2004 au 24 janvier 2005]. München: Schirmer/Mosel, 2004. Text in French, English (transl. Simon Pleasance and Fronza Woods), and German (transl. Matthias Wolf) ISBN 978-3-8296-0172-6
- Stéphane Calais: boxe thaï. Orléans: HYX, 2002. French text, and English translation by Simon Pleasance.
