= Carl Linnaeus the Younger =

Swedish naturalist (1741–1783)

- Carl von Linné den yngre
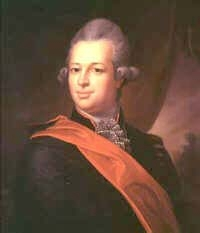
- Portrait by Jonas Forsslund
- Born: 20 January 1741; Falun, Kopparberg County, Sweden
- Died: 1 November 1783 (aged 42); Uppsala, Sweden
- Other names: Carolus Linnaeus the Younger; Linnaeus filius
- Parents: Carl Linnaeus; Sara Elisabeth Moræa
- Family: Linné family
- Scientific career
- Author abbrev. (botany): L.f.

Carl Linnaeus the Younger, Carolus Linnaeus the Younger, Carl von Linné den yngre (Swedish; abbreviated Carl von Linné d. y.), or Linnaeus filius (Latin for Linnaeus the son; abbreviated L.fil. (outdated) or L.f. (modern) as a botanical authority; 20 January 1741 – 1 November 1783) was a Swedish naturalist. His names distinguish him from his father, the pioneering taxonomist Carl Linnaeus (1707–1778).

== Biography ==
Carl Linnaeus the Younger was enrolled at the University of Uppsala at the age of 9 and was taught science by his father's students, including Pehr Löfling, Daniel Solander, and Johan Peter Falk. In 1763, aged just 22, he succeeded his father as the head of Practical Medicine at Uppsala. His promotion to professor — without taking exams or defending a thesis — caused resentment among his colleagues.

His work was modest in comparison to that of his father. His best-known work is the Supplementum Plantarum systematis vegetabilium of 1781, which contains botanical descriptions by the elder Linnaeus and his colleagues, edited and with additions by the son.

He took a two-year trip to England, France, the Netherlands, and Denmark between 1781 and 1783. In London he became ill with jaundice and, shortly after his return, he suffered from fever and a stroke from which he died aged 42. Together with his parents, Carl Linnaeus the Younger was buried in the family grave of Uppsala Cathedral.

While still alive, Carl Linnaeus the Younger had inherited his father's extensive scientific collections of books, specimens, and correspondence, and he had worked to preserve them. In October 1784 his mother, Sara Elisabeth (1716–1806), sold the library and herbarium to the English botanist Sir James Edward Smith (1759–1828). After his death his widow, Pleasance Smith (1773–1877), sold the collection to the Linnean Society of London.
