= Willem van Ruytenburch =

Member of the Dutch gentry

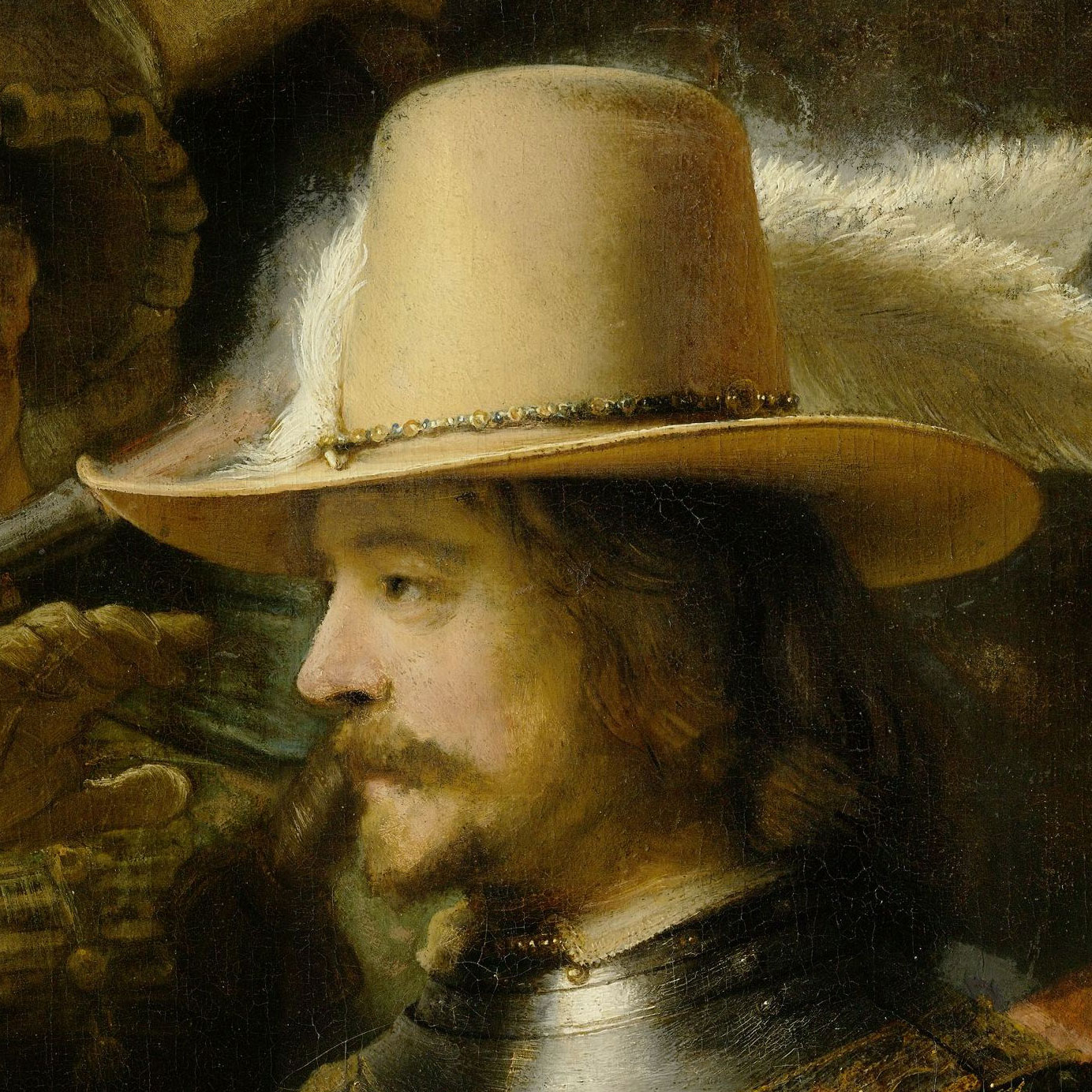
Detail of Willem van Ruytenburch from Rembrandt's The Night Watch

Willem van Ruytenburch, lord of Vlaardingen and Vlaardingen-Ambacht (1600–1652) was a member of the Dutch gentry and Amsterdam patriciate of the Dutch Golden Age. He became an alderman of Amsterdam and joined the Schutterij (city guard) of Frans Banninck Cocq. Willem was featured, as a lieutenant, in Rembrandt's 1642 painting The Night Watch for which he is now probably most famous.

== Biography ==
=== Ancestry and early life ===
Willem van Ruytenburch came from a family of spice merchants, involved in the Eastern trade. His father Pieter van Ruytenburch became wealthy around 1600, the same year that Willem was born. Pieter married Aeltge Pietersdr, an offspring of the Amsterdam Bicker family. Willem had two sisters, Anna van Ruytenburch (1589-1648) who married Adriaen Pauw, Grand Pensionary of Holland, and Christina van Ruytenburch (1591-1666), who married his brother Reinier Pauw, President of the High Council of Holland, Zeeland and West Friesland.

In 1606, Pieter bought a house on Warmoesstraat in Amsterdam that he renamed "Ruytenburch". As a mark of his status he adopted this as his new family name. In 1611 Pieter purchased the manor of Buitenweide (modern-day Oostwijk), in Vlaardingen, from Charles de Ligne, 2nd Prince of Arenberg, for 26,000 guilders. The manor allowed Pieter and his descendants to use the title Lord of Vlaardingen and Vlaardingen-Ambacht. The manor also gave the holder the right to appoint half of the Vlaardingen vroedschap (council), which was resented by some as the van Ruytenburchs were considered outsiders. The van Ruytenburchs also had the right to serve as judges, a potentially lucrative position in which they could collect fines, and wind rights over much of the area.

=== Life and work ===
The Night Watch

In 1626 Willem married Alida Jonckheyna (1609-1677), a woman from a notable Amsterdam family. The couple had the following children:

- Adriana van Ruijtenburgh (1629-1701), married in 1648 with Willem Cornelisz Hartigvelt, vroedschap, schepen and mayor of Rotterdam, and later with Aldert van Driel (born 1629)
- Albert Willemsz van Ruytenburgh (1630-1688), married Wilhelmina Anna van Nassau-Beverweerd (1638-1688), daughter of Lodewijk van Nassau-Beverweerd and Isabella Countess of Hornes. Through his marriage he was linked to the high english aristocracy, representative a brother-in-law to Henry Fitzroy, 1st Duke of Grafton, illegitimate son of King Charles II of England
- Jan van Ruytenburgh (1635-1719) advisor if the Admiralty of 't Noorderkwartier between 1681 and 1719, Hoogheemraad of Delftland. Married to Catharina van der Nisse (1635-1722), daughter of Gillis van der Nisse (1616-1657) burgemeester van Goes en Geertruid Simonsdr. van Alteren (1613-1639).
- Gerard Constantin van Ruytenburgh (1649-1701)
- Elisabeth van Ruytenburgh (died 1697), married in 1650 with Amilius Adriaensz Cool, vroedschap, schepen and mayor of Gouda, Hoogheemraad of Schieland

Willem's father Pieter died in 1627 and he inherited his estates and titles. Soon afterwards Willem constructed a new house, named Het Hof, on a country estate. Willem had pretensions to nobility and in 1632 persuaded an old woman to swear in a court of law that he was descended from Duchy of Brabant nobility, with ancestry in Budel.

In the mid 1630s Willem was appointed as a schepen (alderman) of Amsterdam and lieutenant in Captain Frans Banninck Cocq's Schutterij (city guard) company. He was commemorated in Rembrandt's 1642 painting The Night Watch, holding a prominent position in the foreground dressed in expensive and ornate yellow clothing and carrying a ceremonial lance. His clothing is made of chamois leather and would have been made to measure in the latest Parisian style.

The men featured in the painting, all part of Cocq's company, paid a total of 1,600 guilders to Rembrandt (an average of 100 guilders each) with the payments increasing with their prominence in the piece. Willem, because of his positioning and dress, is particularly prominent. So much so that some observers might mistake him for the commander of the company, though Cocq's position is affirmed by a red sash and directing arm. The Delphi Classics collection of Rembrandt's work suggests that Rembrandt portrays Willem's vanity through his clothing, but ensured that the shadow cast by Cocq's arm falls on Willem as a sign of the captain's superiority.

Willem was active politically and appeared frequently at court in The Hague but, lacking true noble connections, failed to achieve the status he desired; he moved from Amsterdam to The Hague in 1647 and retired to Vlaardingen where he died in 1652. Willem was buried in the family vault of the Grote Kerk in Vlaardingen.

== Legacy ==
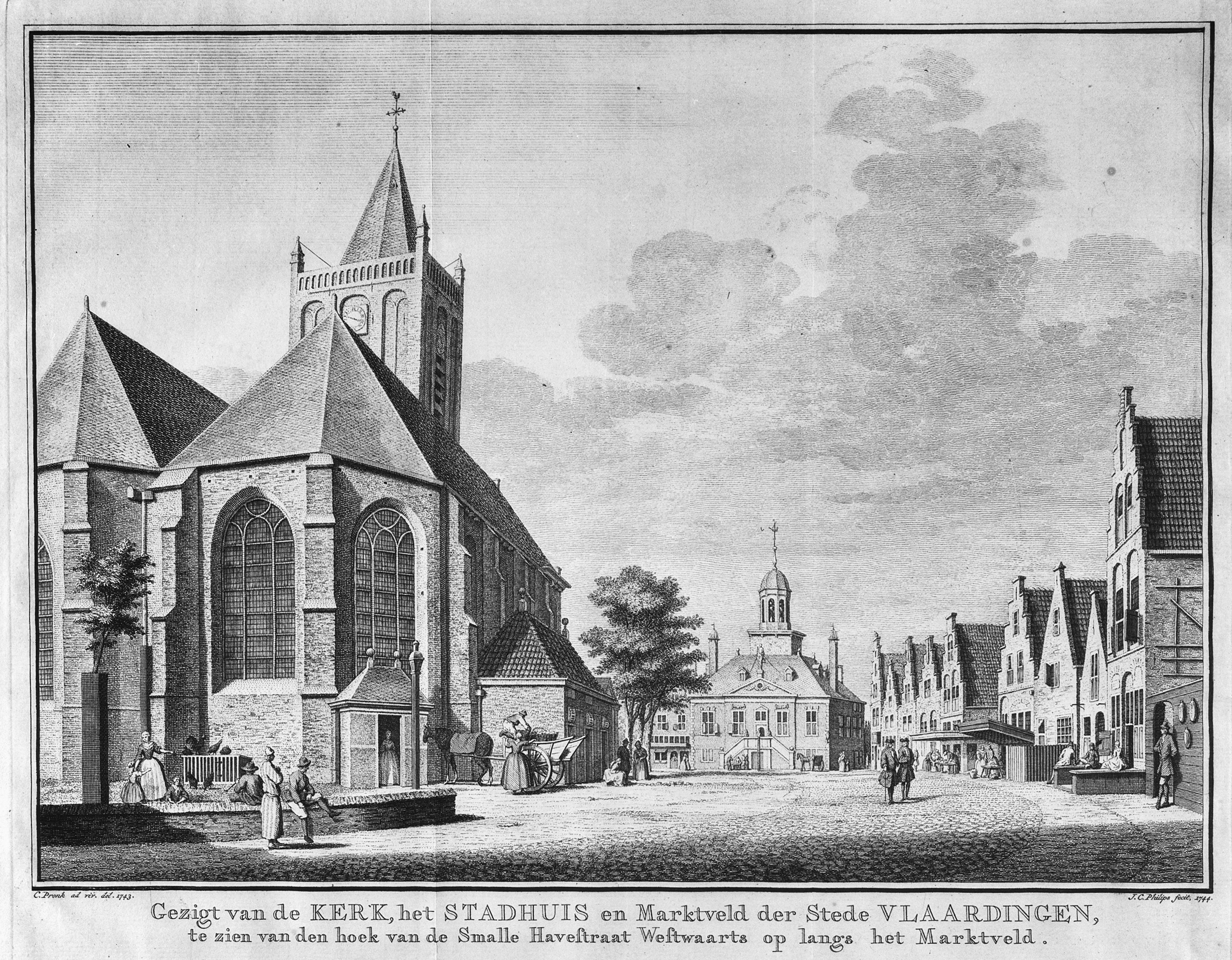
An 18th-century depiction of the Grote Kerk, Vlaardingen

Because of his presence in The Night Watch, recognised as one of the best paintings of the Dutch Golden Age, Willem van Ruytenburch achieved greater fame (as "the man dressed in yellow") after his death than he had in life. The painting's full name mentions Willem: "The Company of Captain Frans Banning Cocq and Lieutenant Willem van Ruytenburch" and since 1885 it has hung in the Rijksmuseum, the Dutch national museum.

The Vlaardingen Museum considers Willem van Ruytenburch perhaps the most famous former resident of the city. Willem's descendants remained as ambachtsheer (minor gentry) in Vlaardingen until 1830, when the Het Hof estate was sold to the city and demolished. The van Ruytenburch burial vault at Grote Kerk was cleared not long after the estate was sold.
