= Adriaan Pauw =

17th-century Grand Pensionary of Holland

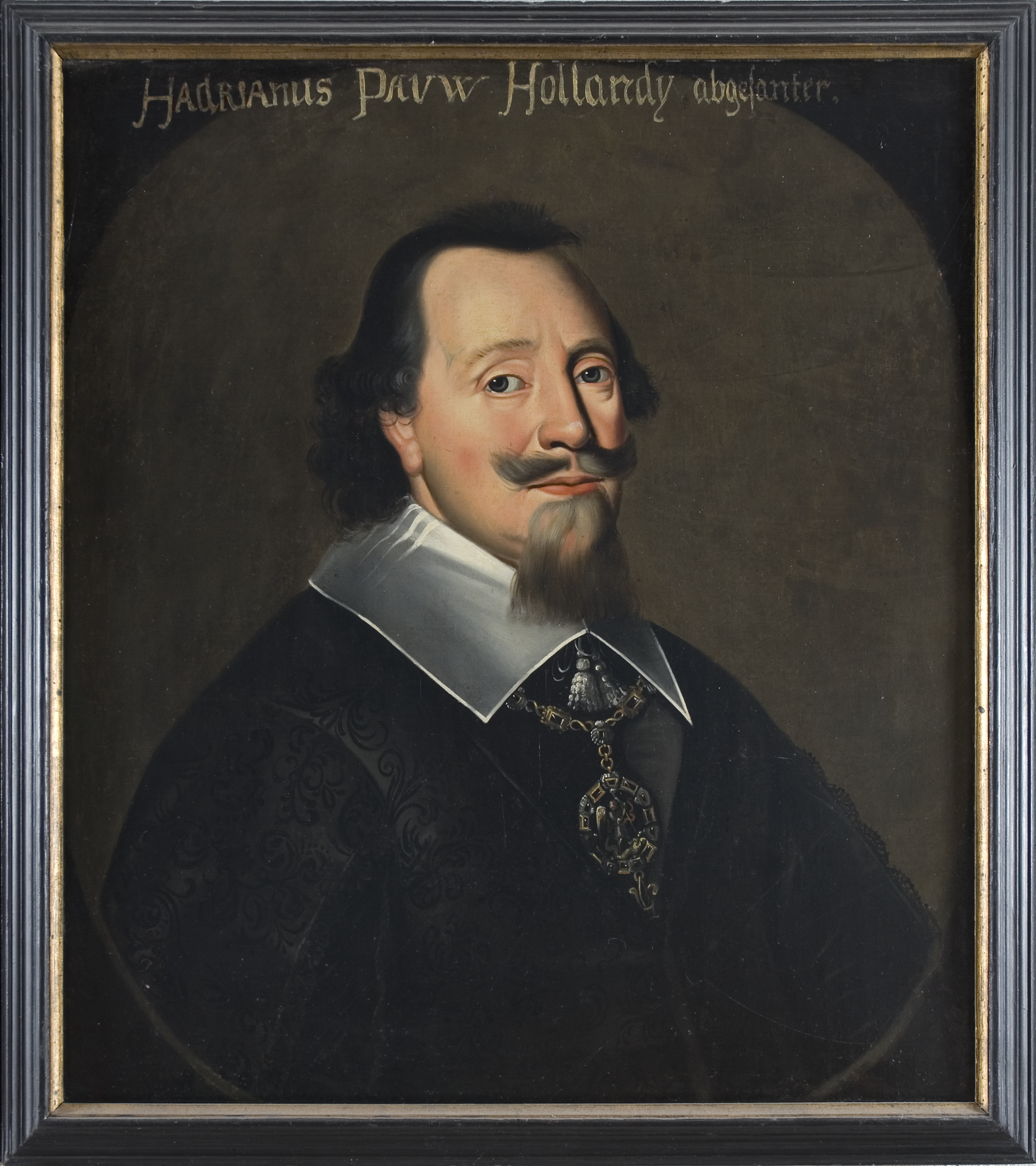
Adriaan Pauw (1585-1653)

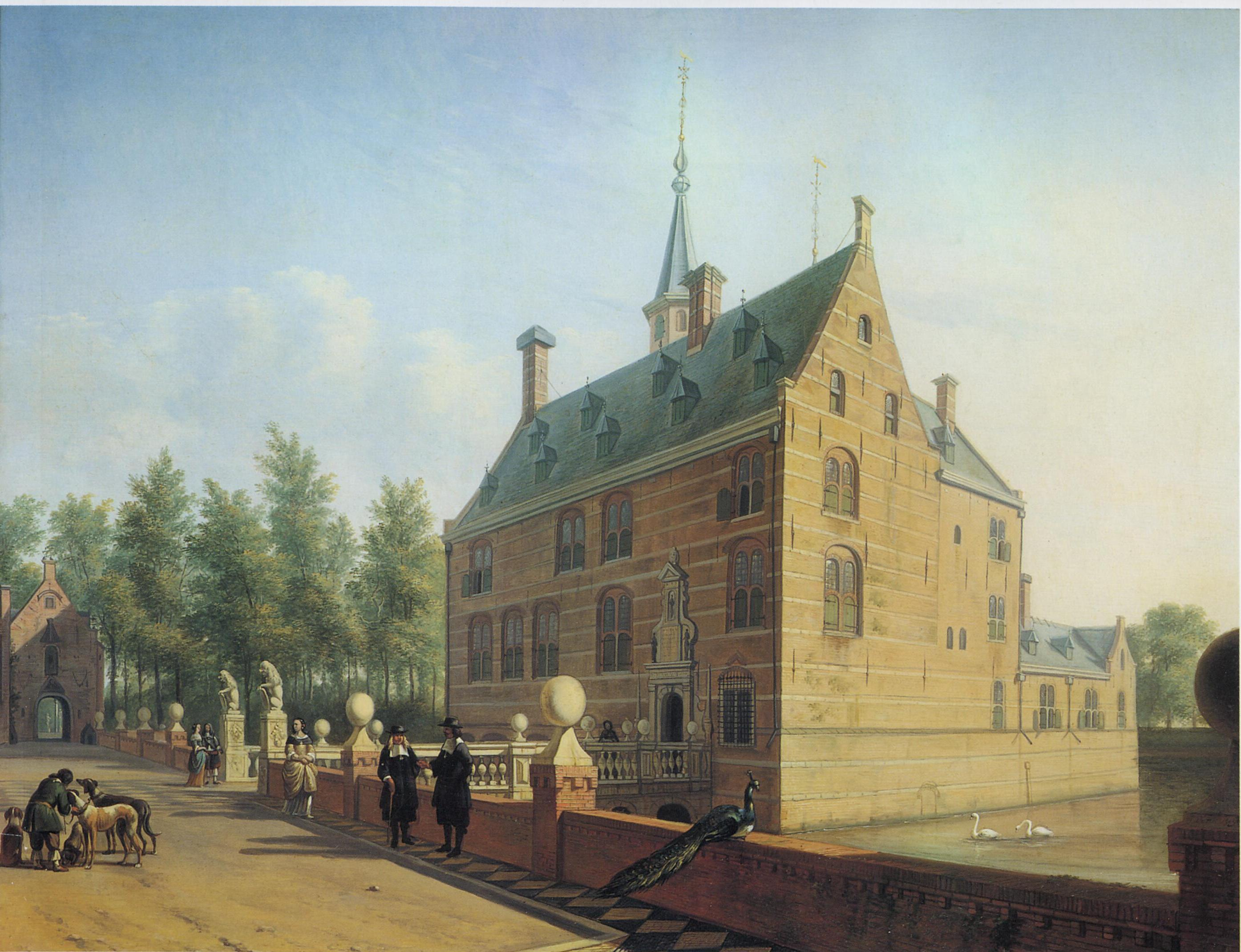
Slot Heemstede in 1667 by Gerrit Adriaenszoon Berckheyde.

Adriaan Pauw, knight, heer van Heemstede, Bennebroek, Nieuwerkerk etc. (1 November 1585 – 21 February 1653) was Grand Pensionary of Holland from 1631 to 1636 and from 1651 to 1653.

== Life ==
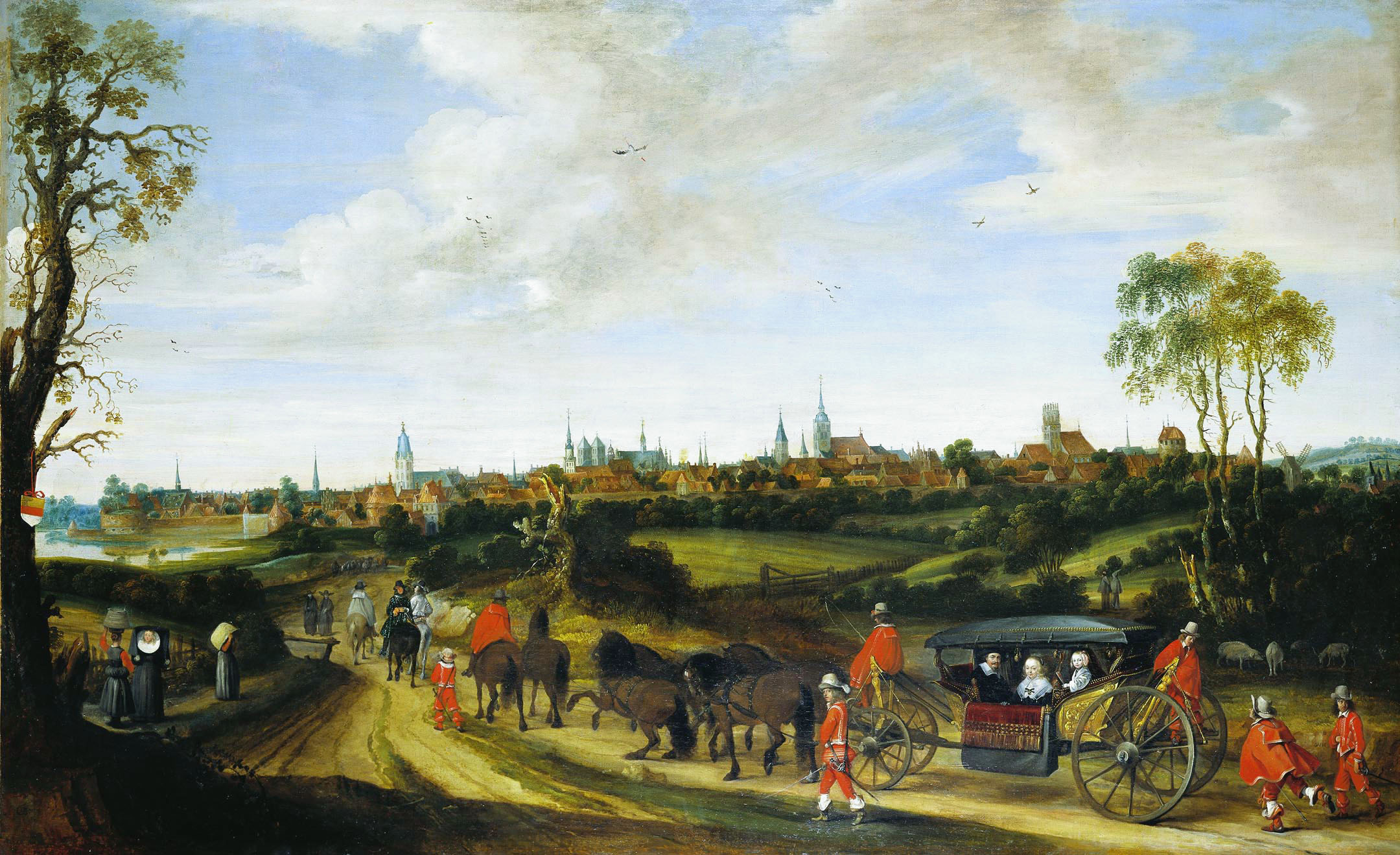
Arrival of the envoy Adriaan Pauw in Münster (1646 oil painting by Gerard ter Borch)

He was born in Amsterdam in a rich merchant family; his father, Reynier Pauw wasn't only a merchant, but also a long time Mayor of Amsterdam. Adriaan studied law in Leiden and was the pensionary of Amsterdam from 1611 to 1627. In 1620 he bought a plot in Heemstede and became 'Lord of Heemstede'. He bought a few rare tulips during Tulip Mania and planted them in his garden surrounded by several mirrors positioned strategically to fully reflect the flowers' beauty.

He was appointed grand pensionary in 1631. Pauw, Holland and Amsterdam and there particularly Andries Bicker wanted an alliance with Spain, but Prince Frederick Henry of Orange wanted an alliance with France. Frederick Henry sent Pauw to France to start an alliance against Spain. Pauw accepted this assignment and allied with France. He resigned in 1636 as grand pensionary. After the Peace of Münster (1648) for which he was instrumental as ambassador for Holland Pauw became grand pensionary again in 1651 although there was much opposition against him. He tried to stop a war with England in 1652. He died in 1653.

== Family ==
Adriaan Pauw was married to Anna van Ruytenburgh (1589–1648), daughter of Pieter van Ruytenburgh, heer van Vlaardingen, Vlaardingerambacht en Ter Horst (1562–1627), a wealthy merchant, and sister of Willem van Ruytenburch. Her mother was Aleyda Huybrechts van Duyvendrecht. Pauw's brother Reinier R. Pauw married to Anna's sister Christina van Ruytenburch (1591-1666).

== Literature ==
- H. W. J. de Boer, H.Bruch, H. Krol (edit.). Adriaan Pauw (1585–1653); staatsman en ambachtsheer. Heemstede, 1985.
- J. C. Tjessinga. Schets van het leven van Adriaan Pauw. Heemstede, 1948.
- J. C. Tjessinga. Het slot van Heemstede onder Adriaan Pauw. Heemstede, 1949.

Political offices
Preceded by Jacob Cats	Grand Pensionary of Holland; 1631–1636	Succeeded by Jacob Cats
Preceded by Jacob Cats	Grand Pensionary of Holland; 1651–1653	Succeeded by Johan de Witt
