= Rajacenna =

Dutch artist

- Born: Rajacenna van Dam; January 24, 1993 (age 33); Vlaardingen, South Holland, Netherlands
- Known for: Ambidextrous hyperrealistic pencil drawings
- Website: www.rajacenna.com

Rajacenna van Dam (born January 24, 1993), known professionally as Rajacenna, is a Dutch hyperreality pencil drawing artist. She is ambidextrous and is known for using both hands to draw different portraits simultaneously. A brain scan showed that the left and right sides of her brain are three times more connected than average. Her paintings sell for between €6,000 and €12,000 each.

== Biography ==
=== Early life ===
Rajacenna van Dam was born on January 24, 1993 in Vlaardingen, Netherlands. Her first name is a combination of the names of her mother and father and, as such, had to be officially approved.

As an actor, she played Remco's daughter for two episodes of the Dutch program Ernstige delicten (later called Serious Crimes) and worked as a model and a TV host. She began as a presenter of the first Dutch Web TV for children when she was 12 years old.

=== Career ===
When Rajacenna was 16 years old, she took up pencil drawing seriously, inspired by an Italian street artist. She did not have any drawing lessons or familiarity with techniques.

After three months her work was published in the art book Amazing Pencil Portraits 2. In 2012, she was published again in Amazing Pencil Portraits 3.

In 2011, Justin Bieber ordered a drawing of himself from Rajacenna, which he praised.

In May 2015, she worked with the band Owl City singer-songwriter Adam Young, for whom she made a promotional drawing and a time lapse video of the cover art of his album, Mobile Orchestra.

Rajacenna states that she was inspired to use her feet to create art after joking about it with a reporter during an interview.

In April 2023, Rajacenna posted a video to her YouTube channel in which she creates eight different portraits simultaneously using both of her hands as well as both of her feet.

== Awards and recognition ==
- CosmoGirl - "Born to Lead award"
- Viva magazine - One of the 400 most influential women in the Netherlands
