= Heerlijkheid =

Lowest administrative and judicial unit in Low Countries before 1800

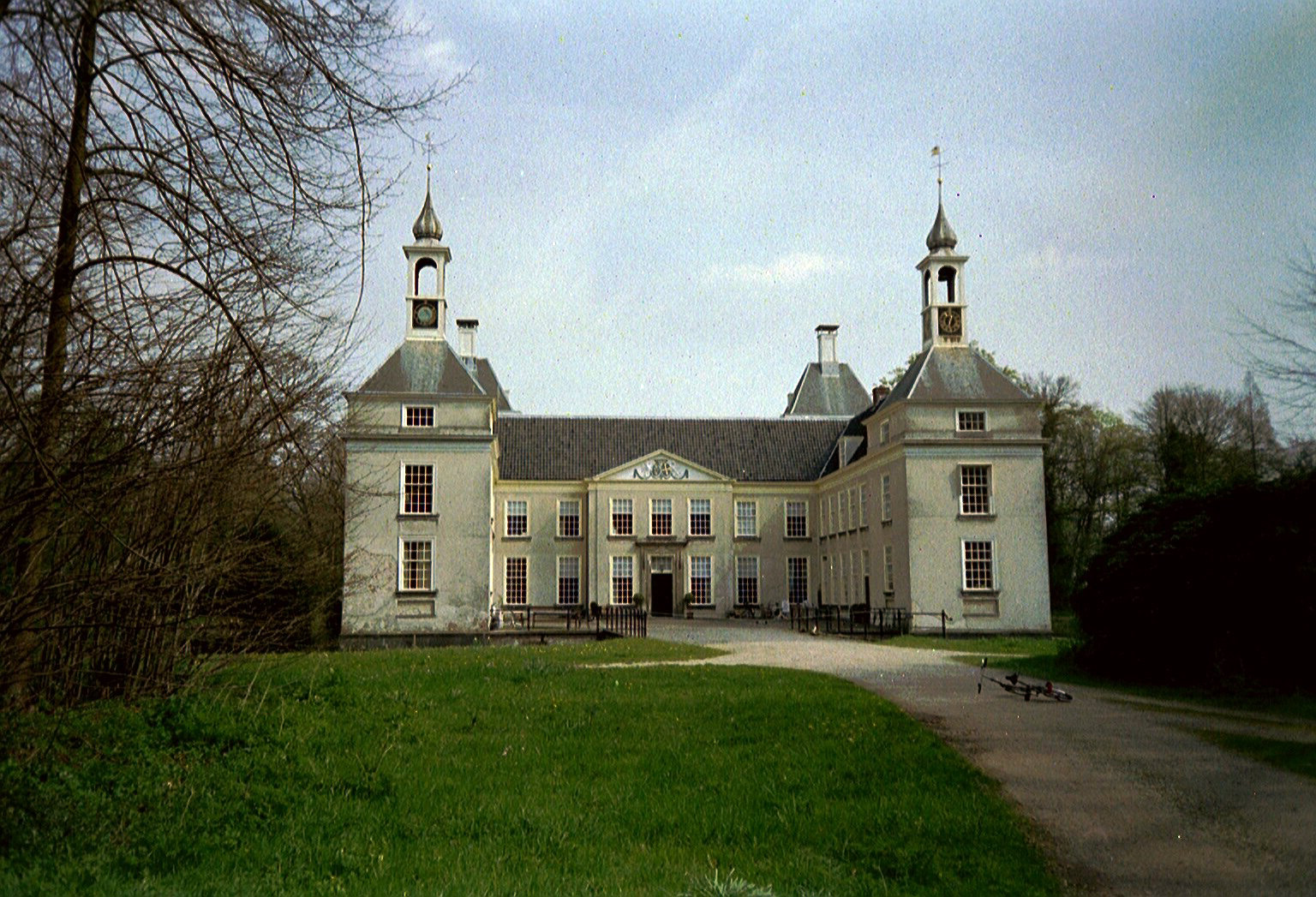
Warmond House (Huis te Warmond), the manor house for the Hoge Heerlijkheid of Warmond

A heerlijkheid (a Dutch word; pl. heerlijkheden; also called heerschap; Latin: Dominium; English: manor, seigniory and lordship; German: Herrschaft) was a landed estate that served as the lowest administrative and judicial unit in rural areas in the Dutch-speaking Low Countries before 1800. It originated as a unit of lordship under the feudal system during the Middle Ages. The heerlijkheid system was the Dutch version of manorialism, that prevailed in the Low Countries and was the precursor to the modern municipality system in the Netherlands and Flemish Belgium.

== Characteristics and types ==
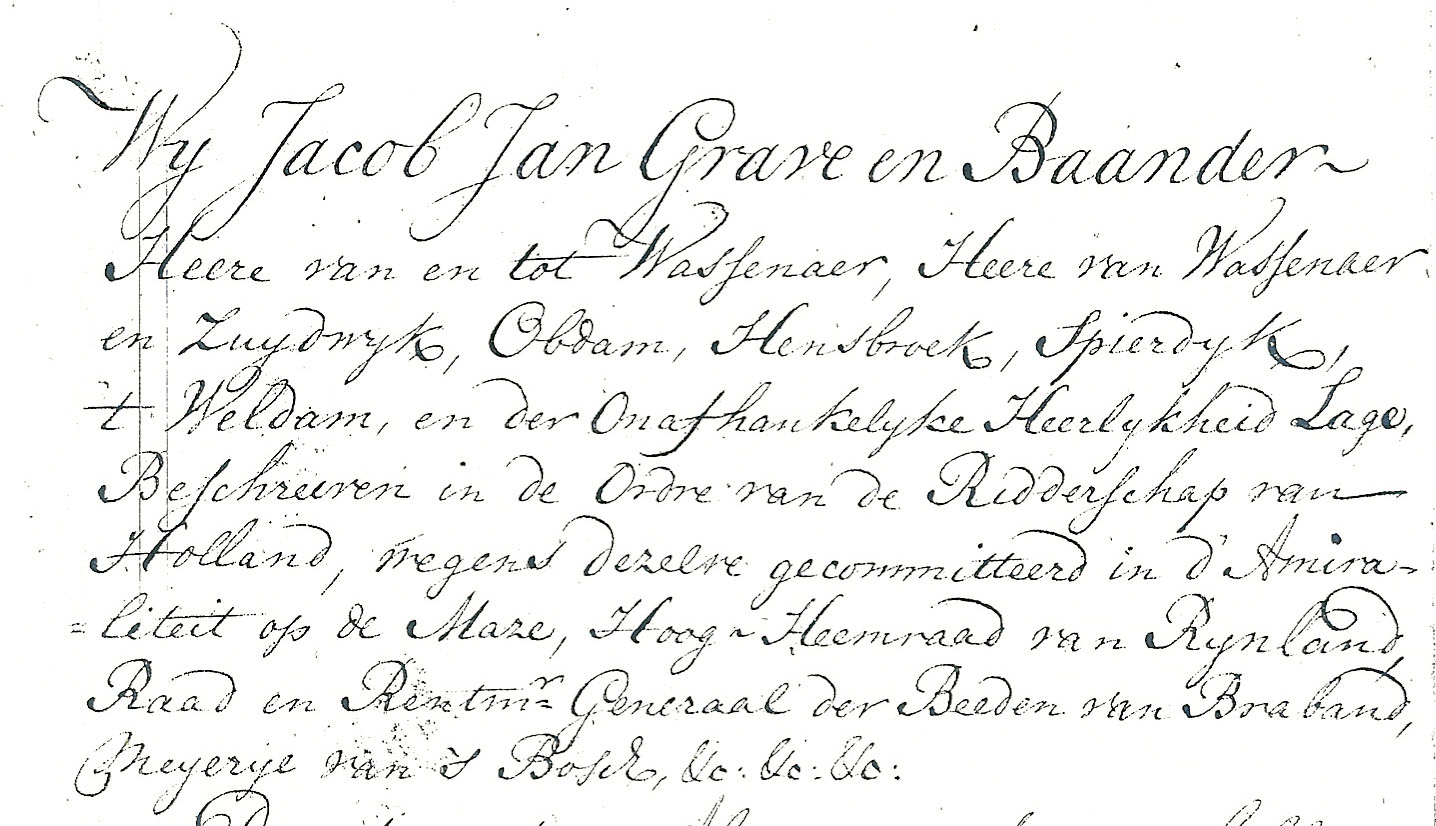
Titles of Jacob Jan, Lord of Wassenaar (1765)

A typical heerlijkheid manor consisted of a village and the surrounding lands extending out for a kilometre or so. Taking 18th-century Wassenaar as an example of a large hoge heerlijkheid, it was 3,612 morgens in size and had 297 houses. Nearby Voorschoten was 1,538 morgens in size and had 201 houses. Nootdorp was an ambachtsheerlijkheid of 196 morgens and 58 houses. There were 517 heerlijkheden in the province of Holland in the 18th century. All fell into the last three categories in the list below (except for a few for which this information is unknown).

Not all heerlijkheden were the same. They differed in size and composition. Also, a heerlijkheid should not be confused with a larger territory, like a county (graafschap) or viscounty (burggraafschap), nor with administrative regions on par with an English shire, Dutch gouw, German Gau, or Roman or Carolingian pagus. A Flemish castellany (kasselrij or burggraafschap) was larger and different from a heerlijkheid, but they were similar in some ways.

There were different kinds of heerlijkheid:

- erfheerlijkheid — a specifically hereditary feudal barony. Depending on the County and era, heerlijkheiden could be hereditary or non-hereditary, and inherited either by the eldest male descendant, all male descendants in the male line in shares, or later by a female descendant where there was no son.
- hoge heerlijkheid — a great barony or ‘honour’, either a fief or allodium. In these large lordships, the lord had jurisdiction to appoint a bailiff (baljuw) instead of just a reeve (schout), and to administer capital punishment. Depending on the county, it was possible for a heerlijkheid to be both prescriptive (vrij) and large (hoge). The largest were actually mini-counties within the county.
  - vrijheerlijkheid — an allod or allodium. These heerlijkheden were a subset of hoge heerlijkheiden, because of the sweeping powers held by the vrijheer, and were often found at the edges of a county. They were called 'free' (vrij) because they were allodial instead of a fief held by an overlord.
- ambacht or ambachtsheerlijkheid — a serjeanty, often located inland rather than on the borders. Serjeanties sometimes consisted of nothing more than a castle and a few hectares of land, although most were larger than this. The serjeant did not have the power of 'pit and gallows', i.e., the power to impose the death penalty.
- schoutsambt — a reeveland, the territory under the charge of a reeve (schout), thus equivalent to the jurisdiction of a heerlijkheid

== Lord of the manor (heer) ==
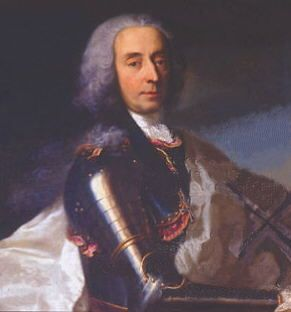
Unico Wilhelm van Wassenaer-Obdam as painted by George de Marees

The central figure was the lord of the heerlijkheid and effectively its owner—the manorial lord or lady. In Dutch, the lord was called heer and the lady vrouw(e). The lord was also referred to by the Latin word dominus. A rarer English alternative is seigneur. There were different kinds of lord and lady:

- vrijheer and vrijvrouwe (literally, 'free lord' and 'free lady') — allodial lord or allodiary, tenant of an allodial lordship.
- erfheer and erfvrouwe (literally, 'hereditary lord' and 'hereditary lady') — feudal baron or mesne lord, tenant of a fiefdom.
- baanderheer (literally, ‘knight banneret’) — tenant by knight-service; some lords used this title when their noble line was ancient and therefore superior to other nobles
- ambachtsheer — tenant by serjeanty (ambacht or ambachtsheerlijkheid).

Under the feudal system, a manorial lord typically was himself the vassal of a higher-ranking tenant-in-chief, usually a highborn noble, who was in turn the crown vassal of the king or emperor. However, sometimes there was no mesne tenancy (tussenliggende heerschappij), as was the case with knight's fees held in capite (rijksonmiddellijke heerlijkheid). The heerlijkheid was ruled directly by a count (graaf), a viscount (burggraaf) or a baron (baron). Also, it was not uncommon for the lord to be ecclesiastical, e.g. a prince-bishop (prins-bisschop) or prince-abbot (vorst-abt).

Originally, heerlijkheden were held exclusively by the nobility. However, starting around the 16th century, lordship over a heerlijkheid was not synonymous with nobility. A heerlijkheid could be bought and sold. Many ended up in the hands of wealthy merchants and a political class known as the regents.

In addition, many were bought by boroughs (burghs). In the 16th, 17th and 18th centuries, it was not unusual for a borough to purchase the heerlijkheden around it in order to gain control and ownership of the surrounding land and the resulting economic advantages. Boroughs were themselves not part of the manorial system: the countryside and villages were governed by lords, whereas boroughs were self-governing.

== Feudal origins ==
The heerlijkheden came into being as a result of the feudal system, in particular the sovereign's delegated judicial prerogative. The crown, as lord paramount, granted the right to govern and to exercise judicial authority to a crown vassal, often a confidante or as a reward for military service or political support. The crown vassal—e.g. a count (graaf) or duke (hertog)—thus exercised all or part of the sovereign's royal authority. In turn the crown vassal granted rights to the mesne lords of the heerlijkheden.

Because a fief (leen) originated out of a bond between vassal and lord for military service, vassalage (Dutch manschap) was personal not heritable. With the advent of professional armies, the vassalage bond fell into disuse or was replaced by scutage; however, vassalage remained personal. One of the consequences of this was that, on the death of the vassal (leenman or vazal), the fief escheated to the lord (leenheer). The vassal's heir was able to retain the heerlijkheid through the commendation ceremony (leenhulde), the process of paying homage and swearing fealty officiated at the head manor court (souveraine leenhof or leenkammer). The new vassal made a symbolic payment (leenverhef) to his lord. The same ceremony was held when a heerlijkheid manor was sold. If there was no direct descendant, other blood relatives could exercise their right of laudatio parentum (Du naderschap), which grants them a right of first refusal and explains how heerlijkheden were able to be kept in the same families for centuries.

== Manorial rights ==
The tenancy of a heerlijkheid is not to be confused with land ownership. It was an estate in land, not land per se. Although lords of the manor generally owned property within a heerlijkheid (often substantial amounts), it was possible for a lord not to own any property at all within his own heerlijkheid. Also, when agricultural land was held by a lord in the Low Countries, the amount held was smaller in comparison to other countries.

Lordship conferred a set of manorial rights. The word heerlijkheid denotes an estate in which these limited rights were held and could be exercised. The rights exercised varied widely, and were more extensive and survived longer in the eastern provinces. A manorial lord was able to function as a minor potentate within "his" heerlijkheid. However, his manorial rights were limited and subject to numerous restrictions. The lord was required to conduct himself in accordance with local customary law.

- Appointments: One of the most important manorial rights was the right to appoint bailiffs, reeves, aldermen, magistrates, schoolmasters, dike and polder officials, and so on. A fee was paid by the recipients of these appointments. In particular, the lord was entitled to make the important appointment of the schout 'reeve'. The reeve was charged with local administrative, law enforcement, and prosecutorial duties. The lord's right to appoint this official was significant because it entailed the associated right to receive the profits from amercements collected by the reeve from sentences and fines for minor and mid-level offences. (Higher fines were paid to officials appointed by a count or duke, i.e. the sheriff, called variously hoofdschout, hoofdmeier, drossaard or amman). The lord of the manor was entitled to act as reeve himself, but most lords delegated this duty by appointing someone else to the office.
- Advowson: A lord might have a right to make advowsons, be they collative (collatie), presentative (gezag) or donative (agrement) when it comes to instituting a parish priest or minister. As early as the high Middle Ages there were already disputes with ecclesiastical authorities over the usurpation of this right. After the Reformation, the involvement of a lord in a minister's institution might similarly result in tension between the lord and his vassals, particularly in places where the lord was of a different faith than most of his fellow parishioners.
- Manor house: Most heerlijkheden had a manor house that served as the caput, or 'capital messuage', of the lord, though not necessarily his permanent residence if he held multiple manors. There were sometimes grand homes with estates or even castles. (Some of these grand homes and castles still exist.)
- Church: If a parochial church had been founded by a previous lord, the lord was considered to have his own church and enjoy the rights that went with that.
- Coat of arms: A lord had his own coat of arms, which was displayed in places like church pews and windows and carriages. Many of these became municipal coats of arms.

== Income from a heerlijkheid ==
A lord was entitled to receive feudal incidents in the form of rents, levies, and other payments from various financial and property rights associated with a heerlijkheid:

- Real burdens (onroerende belastingen): Any bonded or unfree feuar (cijnsplichtige) of the manor's dependent holdings was required to pay a yearly feu-duty (cijns or cijnsgeld), which is comparable to the payment of property taxes today. The amount of the cijns was proportional to the size of the burdened land. Since the amount of the cijns was not tied to inflation, it remained negligible during most of this period.
- Tenurial rents (pachtgelden): The largest revenue source for the lord of the manor was usually the leasehold rents from tenant farmers working free peasant land.
- Entry fine (pontpenning or werfschilling): The lord of the manor was entitled to levy a fee of around 5% of the sales price when holdings or tenancies were conveyed.
- Relief (keurmede): Usually the lord was entitled to levy a relief duty or heriot which was sometimes referred to in Dutch as the recht van de dode hand, or 'dead hand right'. This was an inheritance tax on a deceased tenant's estate that granted the privilege to an heir to succeed to the deceased's estate. The amount was usually in the order of 5% of the value of the real property. Sometimes the lord also had the right to take the deceased's best chattel (beste kateil/katell). Depending on the region, this was also referred to as the 'best beast' (beste hoofd), referring to the best animal in the herd, or the 'high chair' (hoogstoel), meaning the nicest piece of household furniture. Often there was also a special relief for the estate of a 'foreigner' (inwijkeling), that is, someone not born in the heerlijkheid, and illegitimate children.
- Tolls (tolgelden): Tolls were charged to cross the borders of most heerlijkheden. This was a kind of road toll (wegentol), but it also took the form of a charge on the transport of specific commodities (e.g. salt) or people.
- Astrictions (banrechten): Tenants were required to make use of the infrastructure (mill, smith, oven, etc.) that was operated by the lord of the manor more or less as a business. A typical example of these astrictions was thirlage (banmolen): grain could only be ground at the lord's water mill or windmill. A toll, known as multure, for grinding corn at the manorial mill was paid to the lord (or to the miller who leased the mill from the lord).
- Royal privileges (vorstelijke rechten): Royal privileges included game rights, hunting rights, wind rights (windrecht), piscary (visrecht), and market rights (marktrecht). These traditional rights were usually granted in fief to a vassal lord, who continued to maintain them.
- Ecclesiastical privileges (kerkelijke rechten): In some heerlijkheden certain privileges that were in principle held by the church were absorbed by the heerlijkheid. Tithes might accrue to the feudal estate.
- Fines (described in the previous part in the section on the appointment of the schout)
- Quitrent (dienstgeld): Released a tenant from services due by custom to his lord.
- Appointment fee (referred to by Schama as the leenrecht): "The perquisite paid on appointment to office."
- Marriage and death duties: Marriage required the payment of a fee, the consent of the lord, merchet, etc. In some places in later years the lord would receive gifts on St. Walpurga's Day instead. On death a tax also had to be paid.

== Heerlijkheden and the nobility ==
Originally heerlijkheden were in the hands of the nobility. Much of the wealth of a noble family came from their ownership. Many members of the nobility were heavily dependent on this source of power, income and status. Because the surnames of noble families were often derived from a heerlijkheid (e.g. "van Wassenaer"), it was important for the prestige of the family to maintain ownership over it. However, the economic benefits of a heerlijkheid were not always certain, finances were not always well arranged, and some nobles were poor.

In the province of Holland, possession of a heerlijkheid was a prerequisite for admission to the ridderschap (literally, the "knighthood"), the college of nobles that represented rural areas in the States of Holland. A seat in the ridderschap provided access to various financially interesting honorary positions and offices.

It was not unusual for a noble to amass a number of heerlijkheden. King Willem-Alexander is a modern-day example of a nobleman who holds the titles to many heerlijkheden. In addition to his primary titles, he is the Erf- en Vrijheer van Ameland, Heer van Borculo, Bredevoort, Lichtenvoorde, Het Loo, Geertruidenberg, Clundert, Zevenbergen, Hooge en Lage Zwaluwe, Naaldwijk, Polanen, Sint-Maartensdijk, Soest, Baarn, Ter Eem, Willemstad, Steenbergen, Montfort, Sankt Vith, Burgenbach, Daasburg, Niervaart, Turnhout en Besançon.

Starting around 1500, nobles began selling the rights to heerlijkheden to non-nobles; however, losing a heerlijkheid did not result in loss of noble status. The nobility were recognised by all as having a special status not attached to wealth or ownership of a heerlijkheid.

== Heerlijkheden and the rise of a new nobility ==
In the southern provinces (modern-day Belgium) the financial character of a heerlijkheid was accentuated by the Royal Edict of 8 May 1664. From then on, a noble title was granted only if the following minimum payment was obtained from the income of the feudal estate.

- for a barony (baronie): 6,000 guilders;
- for a county (graafschap) or marquisate (markizaat): 12,000 guilders;
- for a duchy (hertogdom) or principality (prinsdom): 24,000 guilders.

In the southern provinces, this edict ensured the financial stability of the most prominent heerlijkheden and resulted in the rise of a new nobility based on wealth.

Starting around the 16th century, lordship over a heerlijkheid was not synonymous with nobility. A heerlijkheid could be bought and sold. Many ended up in the hands of wealthy merchants and a small and exclusive political class known as the regents. In all the provinces the military obligations associated with a fief gradually died out so that by the 16th and 17th centuries the heerlijkheid was increasingly seen by non-nobles as a status symbol.

Successful merchants and regents from the large towns saw the heerlijkheid as a country residence and a means of giving the appearance of noble status. It often came with large tracts of land and a castle or manor house. In noble fashion, they then added the name of their heerlijkheid to their own surname, resulting in surnames like Deutz van Assendelft, Six van Oterleek, Pompe van Meerdervoort and Beelaerts van Blokland). (The word "van" in the surname meant "of". However, very few Dutch surnames with "van" have their origins in the ownership of a heerlijkheid.) They became what J.L. Price refers to as a "quasi-nobility". A heerlijkheid was also a source of income and an investment, but they were usually acquired for other reasons.

In the Netherlands, acquiring the rights to heerlijkheden did not confer noble status. The regent families who purchased heerlijkheden were not a true nobility, but by the early 19th century the ranks of the nobility had become so depleted that the Dutch king elevated certain members of the former regent class to noble status.)

== Abolition ==
In the southern provinces (modern-day Belgium) heerlijkheden and the associated rights were abolished after the French invasion of 1795. In the northern provinces (modern-day Netherlands) they were declared abolished around the same time as part of the inauguration of the Batavian Republic. This was formalised in the 1798 Batavian Constitution (Bataafsche Staatsregeling). A distinction was made between the feudal rights of appointment and patronage, which were completely abolished, and the income-related rights, which were more complicated. Some of these were feudal in nature and abolished. Others were similar to contractual or property rights and therefore their loss was compensable. Lordly claims for reparations flooded in. Some heerlijkheid rights were maintained or later restored as property rights and still exist today.

The overwhelming majority of the remaining rights disappeared in Belgium on the introduction of the 1830 constitution and in the Netherlands with the 1848 constitutional amendments. Most of the administrative functions of a heerlijkheid were transferred to the municipality and fell under the new Municipality Act (Gemeentewet). Responsibility for the manor courts and judicial system were taken over by the national government.

After this, the use of the title "Lord of..." is based on the ownership of the remaining non-abolished rights. To this day there are people in the Netherlands who use the title "Lord of...". Unlike in the U.K., there is no trade today in 'lord of the manor' titles.

== Heerlijkheid manors ==
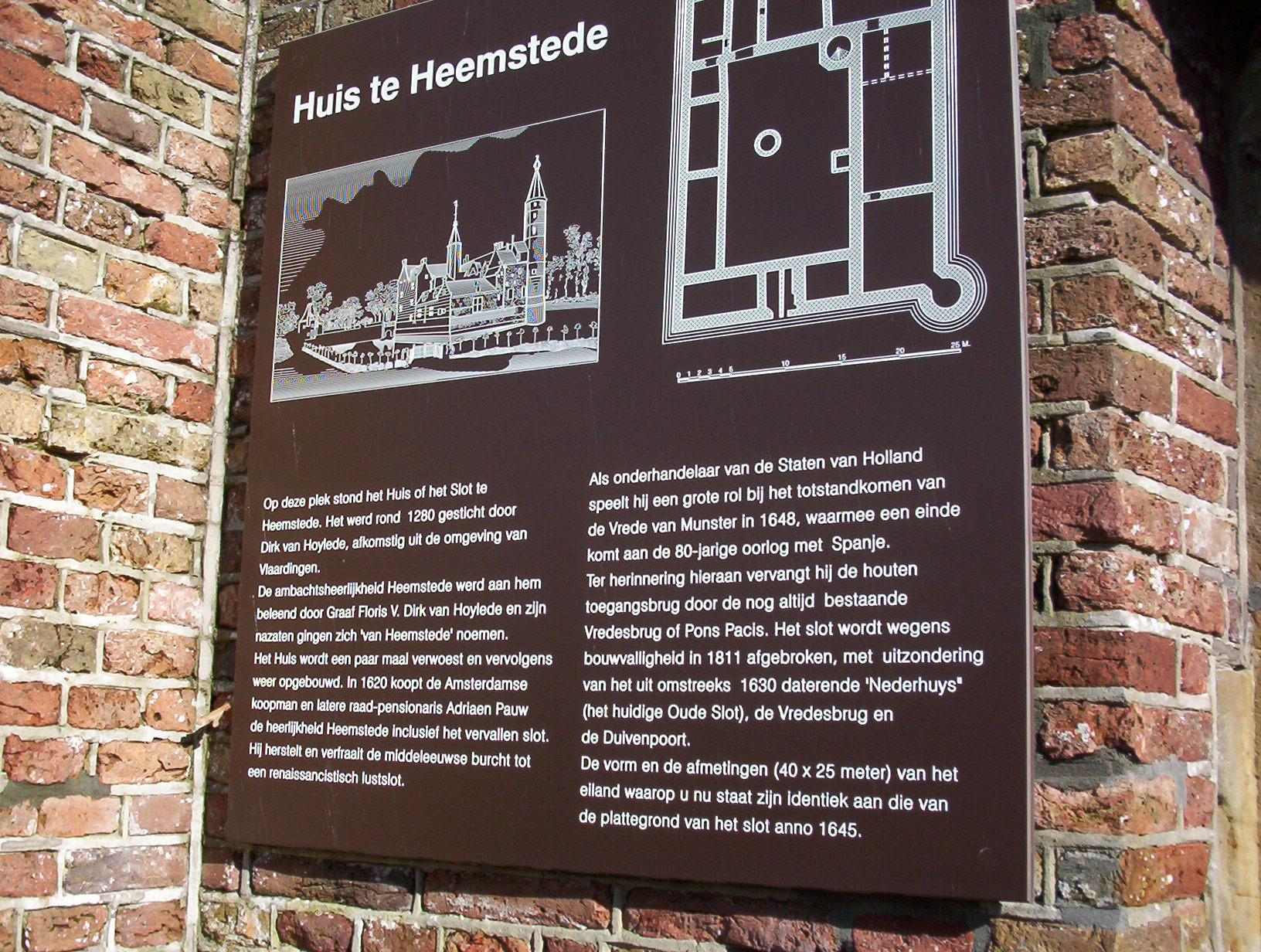
Sign outside of former side of Heemstede Castle

What remains of the heerlijkheid system are many of the manors and castles. Most of them are now parts of estates, museums, parks, hotels, etc. Since the last heerlijkheid was seen over 200 years ago, many of the manor houses and castles have been rebuilt, or have been fully or partially demolished.

A sign erected at the remaining parts of the Slot Heemstede (now in a park) describes what happened to this particular manor. The history and fate of this manor are typical:

On this spot stood Heemstede House or Castle. It was first built by Dirk van Hoylede in 1280, who came from the Vlaardingen area. The ambachtsheerlijkheid of Heemstede was enfeoffed to him by Count Floris V. From then on Dirk van Hoylede and his descendants used the surname 'van Heemstede'. The house was destroyed a couple of times and then rebuilt. In 1620 Amsterdam merchant (and later Grand Pensionary) Adriaen Pauw purchased the heerlijkheid, including its dilapidated castle. After restoration and embellishment, it became a Renaissance summer mansion. As the negotiator for the States of Holland, he played an important role in the 1648 Peace of Munster that ended the Eighty Year War with Spain. As a memorial to this, he replaced the wooden access bridge with the Vredesbrug or Pons Pacis ('Peace Bridge'). By 1811, the house had become dilapidated again, at which time it was demolished with the exception of the 1640 'Nederhuys' ('Lower House'), consisting of the current Old Mansion, the Peace Bridge and the Dove Gate. The form and measurements (40x25 meter) of the island on which you now stand are identical to the plan for the 1645 mansion.

== See also ==
- Herrschaft
- Particuliere landerij, the 17th-century system of feudal landownership in the Dutch East Indies (now Indonesia)
