= Hans Bos =

Dutch biochemist and cancer researcher

Johannes Lukas "Hans" Bos (born 16 June 1950) is a Dutch biochemist and cancer researcher. He has been a professor of physiological chemistry at Utrecht University since 1991. He is also employed by the University Medical Center Utrecht.

== Career ==
Bos was born in Vlaardingen on 16 June 1950. He studied biochemistry at the Vrije Universiteit Amsterdam between 1969 and 1975. In 1980 Bos obtained his title of Doctor at the University of Amsterdam under Piet Borst, with a thesis titled: "Structural analysis of yeast mitochondrial DNA. The region of the 21S ribosomal RNA gene". He then started working under Alex van der Eb at Leiden University. In 1984 Bos started research on Ras mutations. In 1986 Bos became a lector at Leiden University. In 1991 he was appointed professor of physiological chemistry at Utrecht University.

In 2013 the Dutch Cancer Society presented an international "Dream Team" on cancer research, the team was led by Bos and Hans Clevers. In 2015 Dutch newspaper de Volkskrant announced that Bos was the Dutch researcher who obtained most funds in the Netherlands during the previous ten years, obtaining over 31 million euro.

== Honours and distinctions ==
Bos was elected a member of the European Molecular Biology Organization in 1996. He was elected a member of the Royal Netherlands Academy of Arts and Sciences in 2006. In 2014 Bos won the Josephine Nefkens Prize for Cancer Research.
