= Catharina Halkes =

Dutch theologian and feminist (1920-2011)

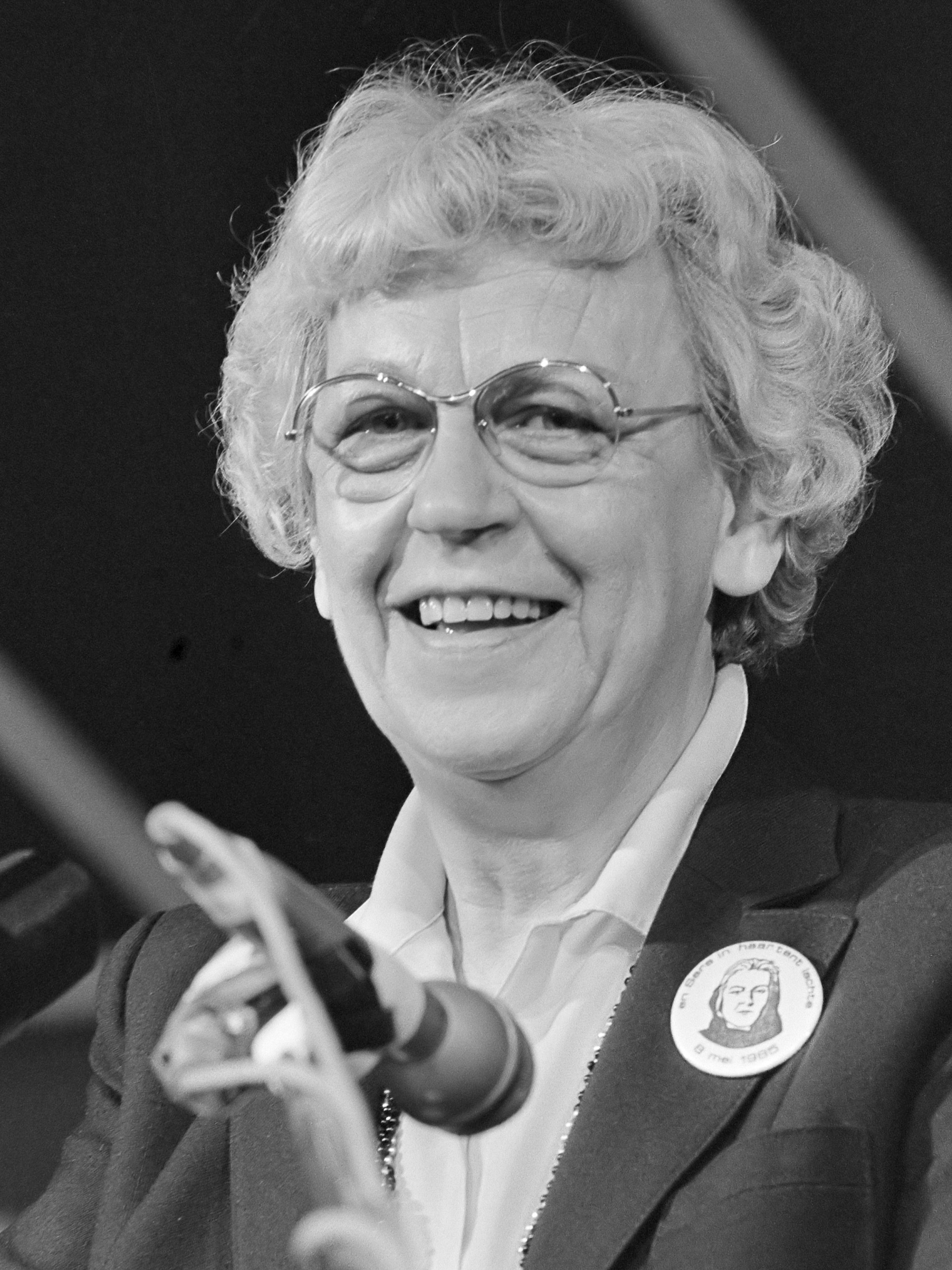
Tine Halkes (1985)

Catharina Joanna Maria Halkes (Vlaardingen, 2 July 1920 - Nijmegen, 21 April 2011) was a Dutch theologian and feminist, notable for having been the first Dutch professor of feminism and Christianity, at the Radboud University Nijmegen from 1983 to 1986. A Roman Catholic who was originally schooled in Dutch language and literature, she became active in the women's movement within the church, and gained a measure of notoriety when she was forbidden to address Pope John Paul II during his visit to the Netherlands in 1985. She is considered the founding mother of feminist theology in the Netherlands.

== Accomplishments ==
Halkes was the first professor of Feminism and Christianity at Radboud University in the Netherlands, which was then known as the Catholic University of Nijmegen.
