= Dirk Hoogendam =

Dutch war criminal (1922–2003)

Dirk Hoogendam, a.k.a. Dieter Hohendamm, alias The Boxer (18 May 1922, Vlaardingen – 8 August 2003 in Ringgau, Germany), was a Dutch war criminal.

Hoogendam joined the Waffen-SS in 1940, later transferring to a Dutch police unit under German command. In 1944 he was involved in tracking down Jews and suspected resistance fighters in the Dutch province of Drenthe. According to eyewitnesses, he severely mistreated prisoners, some of whom died. Arrested after the war, in 1946 he escaped custody and fled to Germany. He was tried in absentia and sentenced to death, which was later commuted to life imprisonment.

In 2001, when he was 78, the Dutch paper De Telegraaf discovered that he was living in Ringgau, Germany, under the name of Dieter Hohendamm. Just before his death, the Netherlands asked the German government to prosecute Hoogendam, together with five other war criminals living in Germany. He however died of heart failure on 8 August 2003 at his home in Ringgau before a final decision whether to prosecute had been made.
