= Wind rights =

Rights relating to windmills and wind power

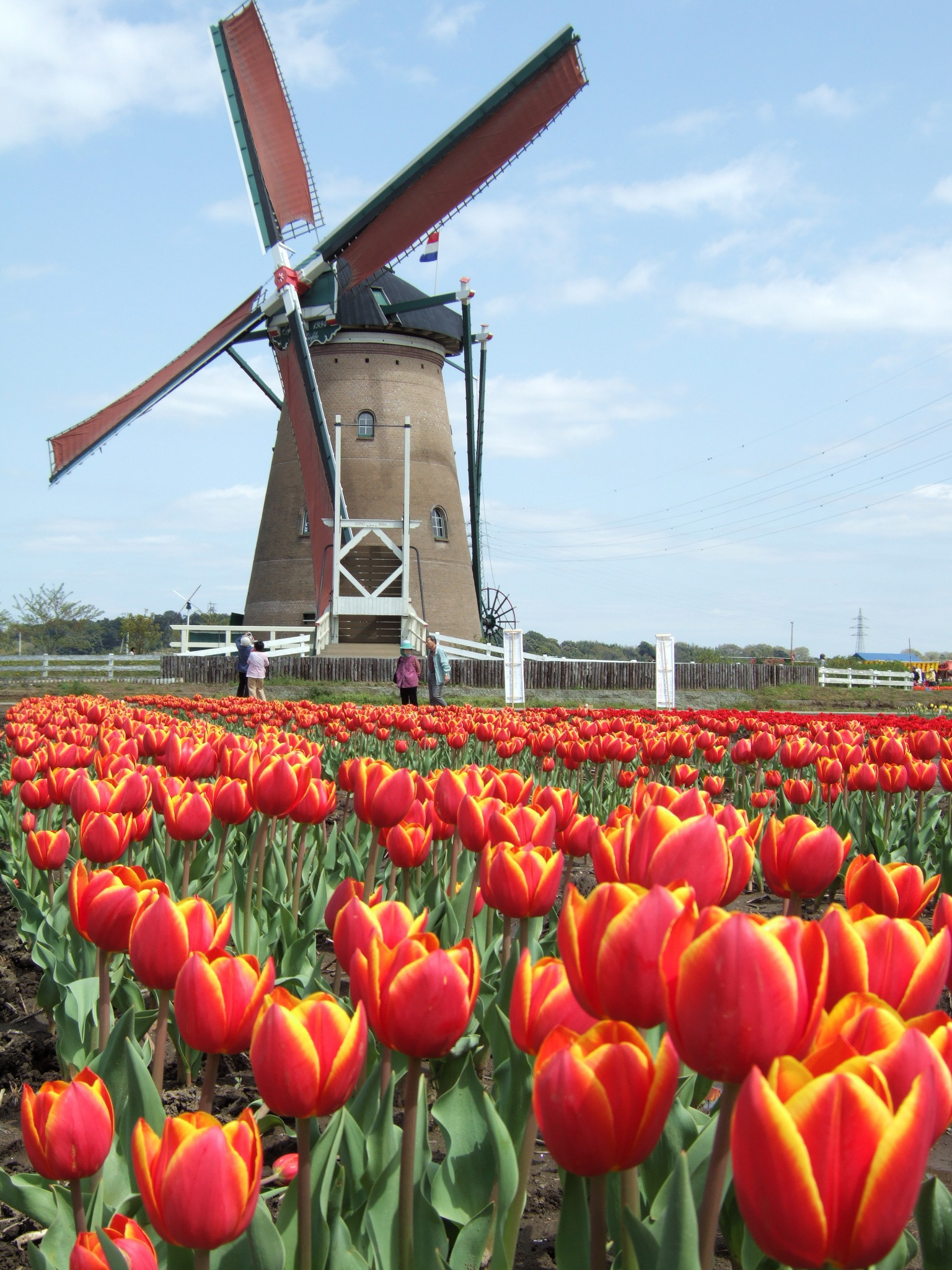
A replica 18th century Dutch windmill fabricated recently in the Netherlands and then assembled on the shore of Lake Imba near Sakura, Japan, named in honour of 'The Love' (De Liefde), the first Dutch sailing vessel to reach Japan in 1600.

Wind rights are rights relating to windmills, wind turbines and wind power. Historically in Continental Europe wind rights were manorial rights and obligations relating to the operation and profitability of windmills. In modern times, as wind becomes a more important source of power, rights relating to wind turbines and windmills are sometimes referred to as "wind rights".

== Low Countries ==
Historically, "wind rights" (Dutch: windrecht) referred to a tax paid by millers in large parts of the Low Countries before around 1800. The tax was paid on the "wind catch" (windvang) needed to turn a windmill, but it was often based on the windmill's output. (Note: This part of the article is an adapted translation of the article on windrecht at the Dutch version of Wikipedia.)

Since a windmill in a heerlijkheid was primarily the property of the lord (although leased out to a miller), wind rights were one way for a lord to discourage competition. In consideration for payment of this tax, the lord ensured that there were no wind obstructions around the mill by imposing a prohibition on buildings and high trees in the area. Another obligation imposed on residents was the "mill obligation" (molendwang), which required them to have their grain ground at the lord's mill. To a certain extent, this was another way for a lord to safeguard the income received from the mill.

Because of these rights and obligations, windmills had to be identifiable. They each had a name, traditionally the name of an animal. An image of the animal was placed on the mill so that even the illiterate would know which mill was which.

In the Netherlands, wind rights and the mill obligations were ended around 1800 when a new constitution was introduced in the Batavian Republic. Similar concepts still exist in modern times. Since around 1973 the wind needed to turn a mill has been referred to as the "windmill biotope" (molenbiotoop). An area of 375 metres (1,230 ft) around a windmill is maintained as a "free zone" so that the windmill can have enough wind. For polder windmills, ensuring that windmills have enough wind is the responsibility of the water board (waterschap or hoogheemraadschap). However, this seldom takes priority over the desire of municipalities to build new housing.

== United States ==
In Minnesota, as a result of the increased interest in wind energy, developers or utilities purchase “wind rights" from landowners to allow the installation of one or more wind generators and an access road to the equipment in exchange for a payment to the landowner.
