= Vlaardinger-Ambacht =

Former municipality in South Holland, Netherlands

Coordinates: 51°55′00″N 4°20′02″E

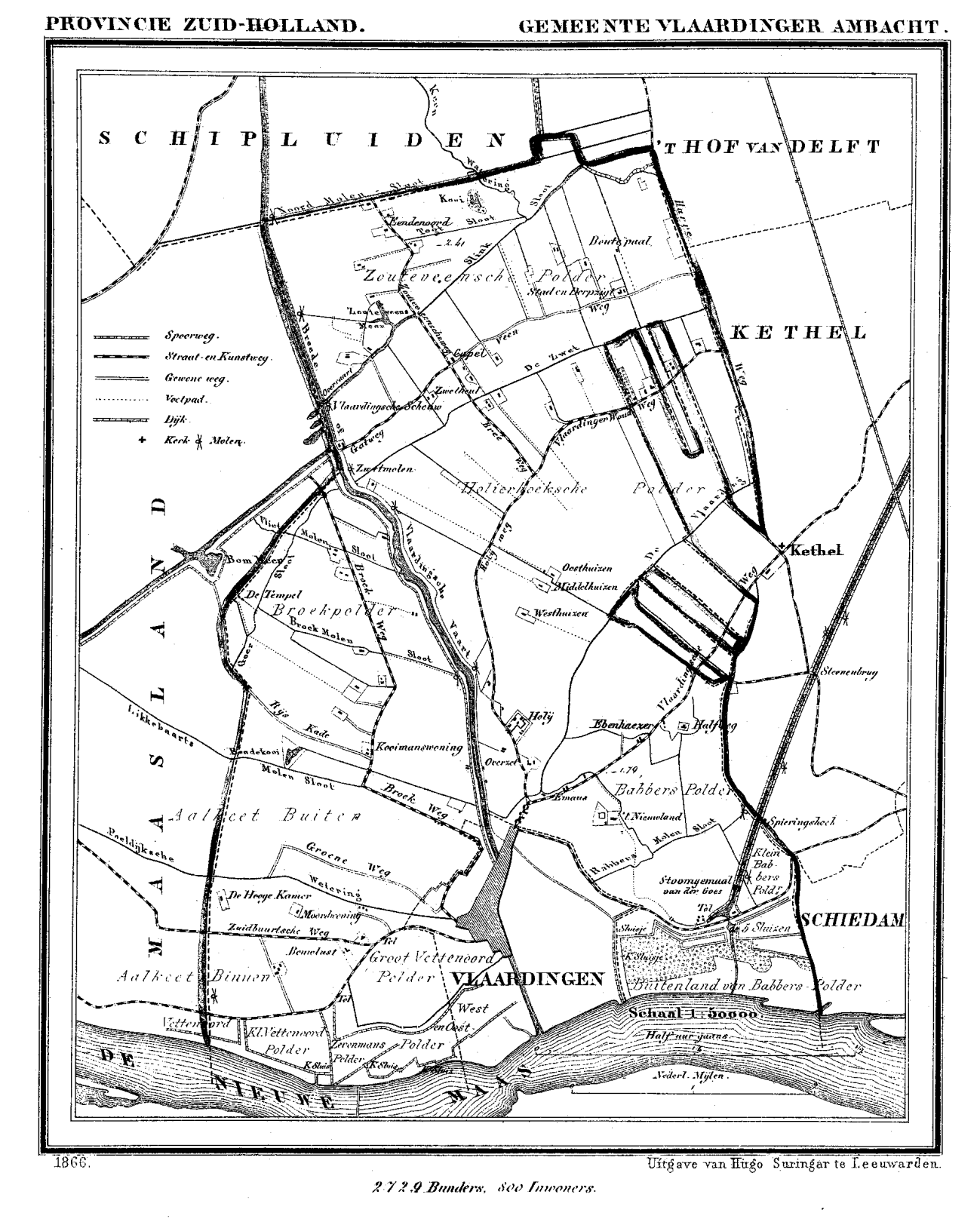
Vlaardinger-Ambacht in 1866

Vlaardinger-Ambacht is a former municipality in the Dutch province of South Holland. It covered the countryside around the city of Vlaardingen.

The municipality existed between 1817 and 1941, when it became part of Vlaardingen.

Before 1817, it was a so-called craftsmanship (an area with a feudal form of government dating back to the Middle Ages, with a 'gentleman' as central person) in the Hoogheemraadschap van Delfland (Delfland Water Board).
