= Vlaardingen =

- Town and municipality
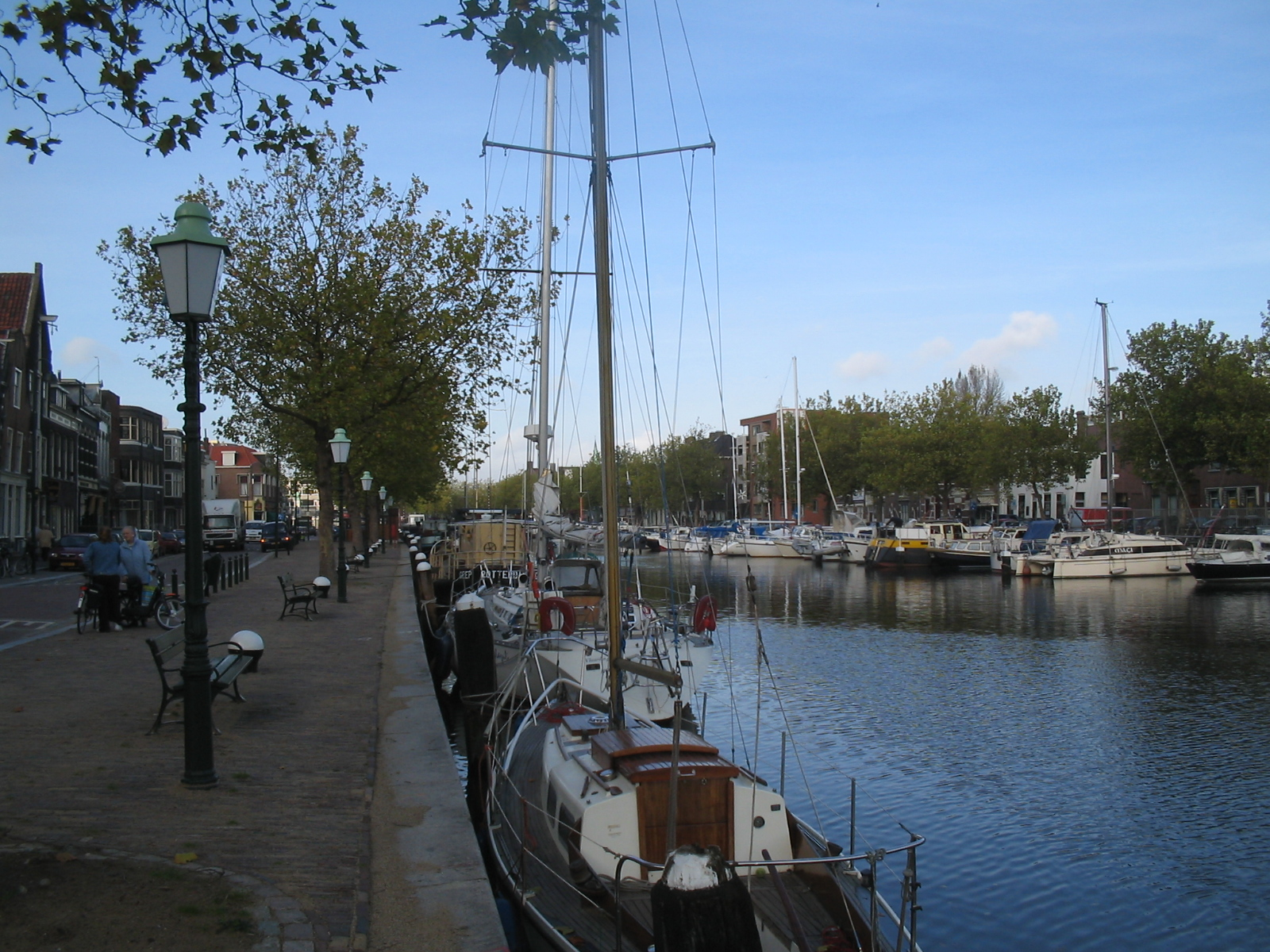
- Old harbour in the centre of Vlaardingen

- Flag Coat of arms
- Nickname: Haringstad (Herring town)
- Location in South Holland
- Coordinates: 51°54′N 4°21′E
- Country: Netherlands
- Province: South Holland

Government
  - Body: Municipal council
  - Mayor: Frederik Zevenbergen (VVD)

Area
  - Total: 26.69 km^{2} (10.31 sq mi)
  - Land: 23.57 km^{2} (9.10 sq mi)
  - Water: 3.12 km^{2} (1.20 sq mi)
- Elevation: 1 m (3.3 ft)

Population (January 2021)
  - Total: 73,924
  - Density: 3,136/km^{2} (8,120/sq mi)
- Demonym: Vlaardinger
- Time zone: UTC+1 (CET)
  - Summer (DST): UTC+2 (CEST)
- Postcode: 3130–3138
- Area code: 010
- Website: www.vlaardingen.nl

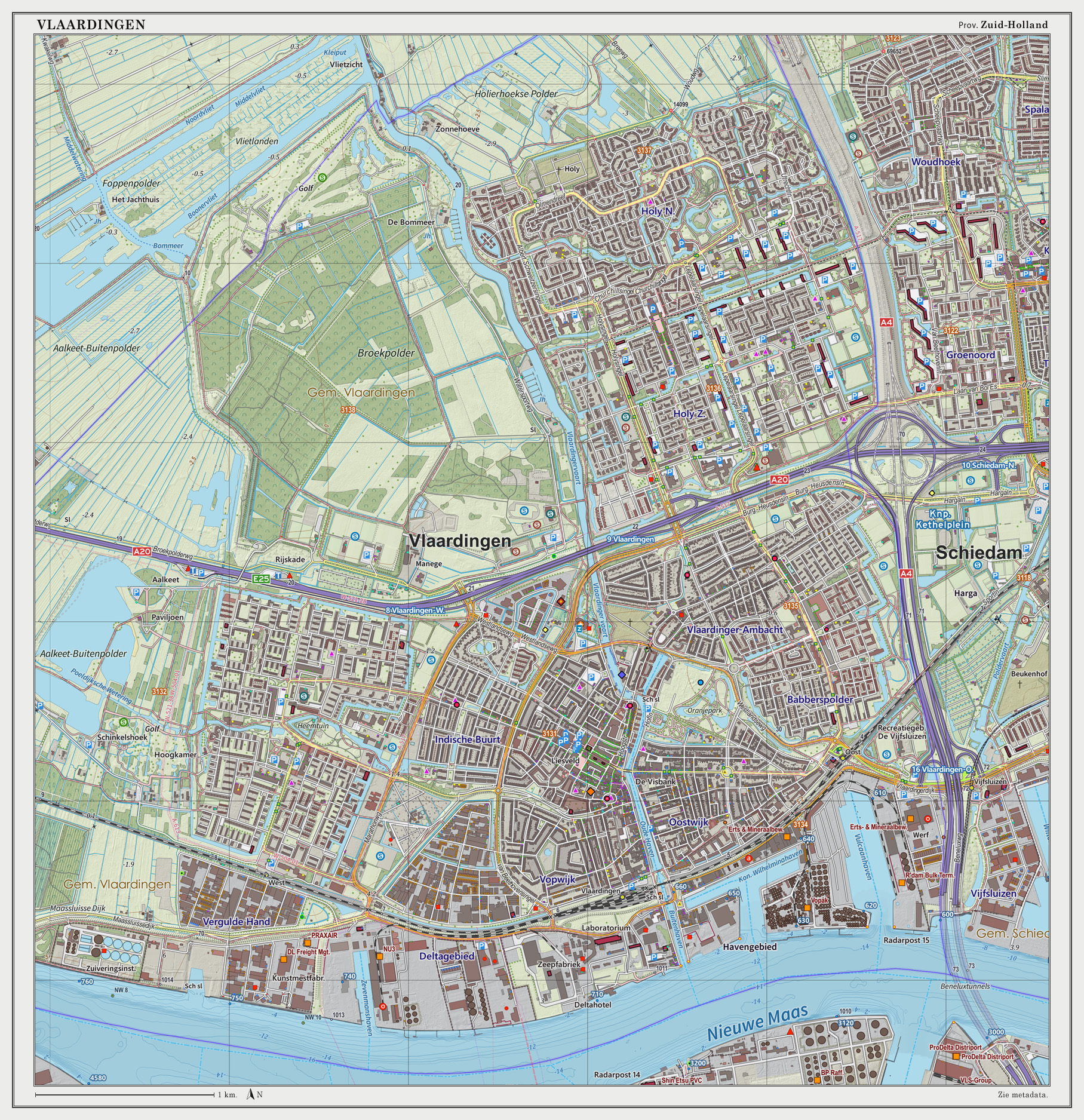
Map of Vlaardingen, September 2014

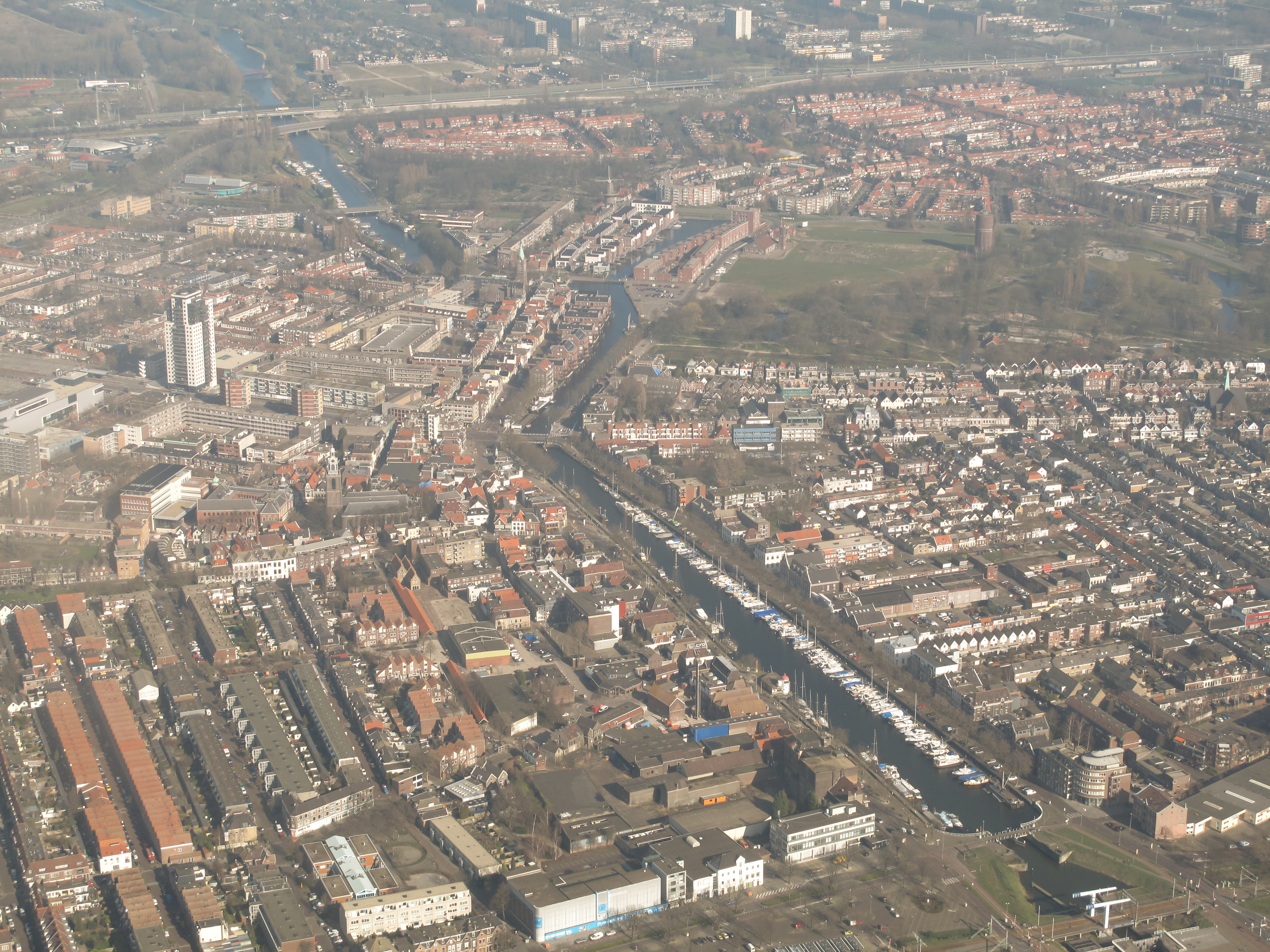
Vlaardingen, town centre from the sky

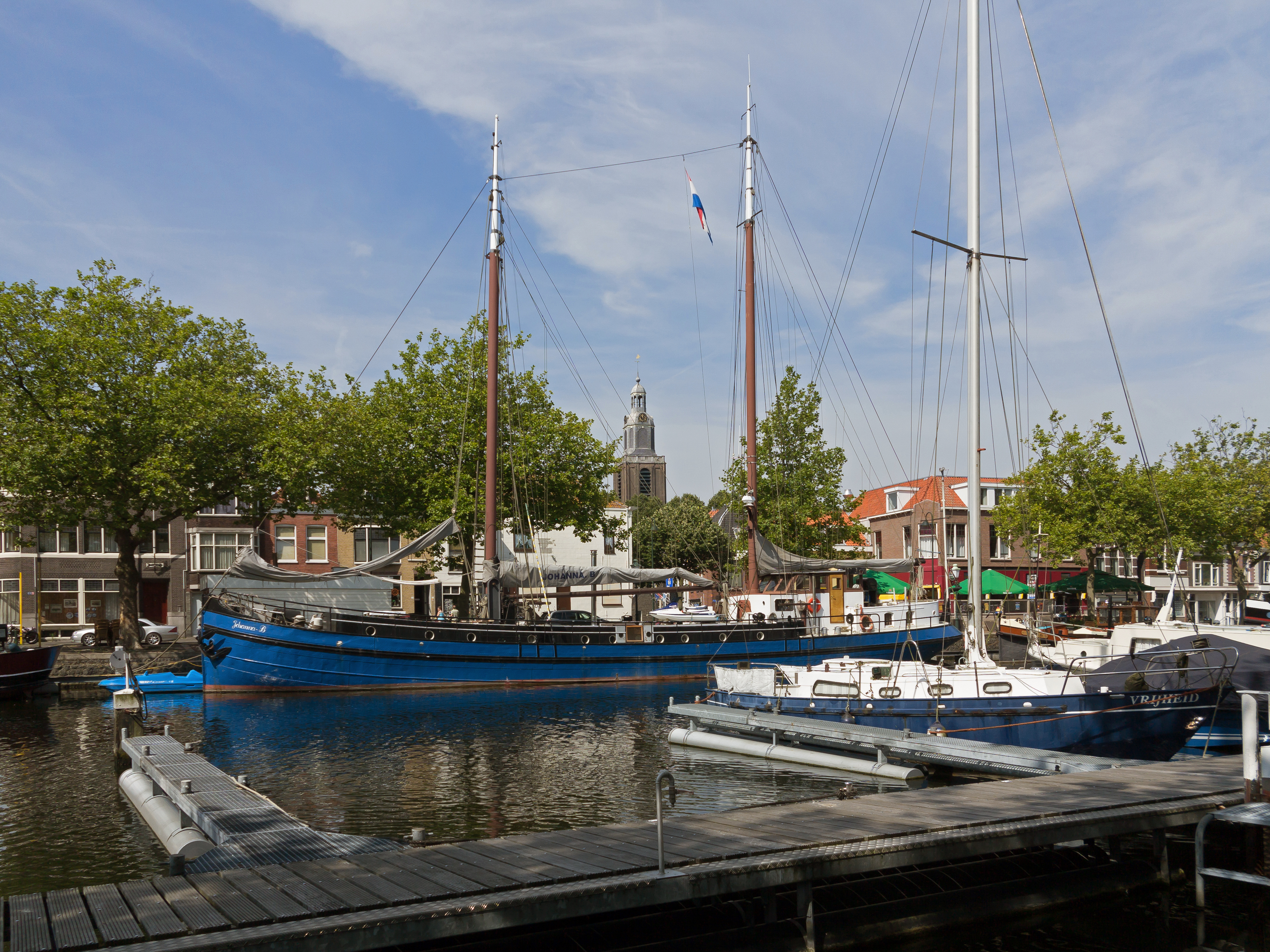
View of the port

Vlaardingen (Dutch pronunciation: [ˈvlaːrdɪŋə(n)]) is a large town and municipality in South Holland in the Netherlands. It is located on the north bank of the Nieuwe Maas river at the confluence with the Oude Maas. The municipality administers an area of 26.69 km^{2} (10.31 sq mi), of which 23.57 km^{2} (9.10 sq mi) is land, with 73,924 residents in 2021.

== Geography ==
The town is divided into a northern part (locally known as the "Holy") and a southern part by the A20 motorway. On the east the town is separated from Schiedam by the A4 motorway. Other places nearby are the small town of Maassluis to the west, the village of Schipluiden and the city of Delft to the north, the town of Schiedam and city of Rotterdam to the east and the town of Spijkenisse in the south-west, on the other side of the river Nieuwe Maas. The A20 connects Rotterdam to the village Hook of Holland. The Beneluxtunnel (the tunnel that runs under the Nieuwe Waterweg) connects the A20 to the A15.

The centre of the town is on the west side of the old harbour, which was originally a stream ('De Vlaarding') from the peat lands north and east of the town, running to the Meuse estuary.

== History ==
The area around Vlaardingen was already settled by about 2900 to 2600 BC. In 1990, a skeleton dated around 1300 BC was dug up on the edge of Vlaardingen. Some human nuclear DNA was identified, the oldest found anywhere in the Netherlands. In Roman times a stronghold or vicus named Flenio may have been on the site of modern Vlaardingen. Between roughly 250 AD and 700 AD the region seems to have been uninhabited, like much of the west of the Netherlands. In 726 or 727 the area is again mentioned as In Pagio Marsum, where a small church was established, around which Vlaardingen formed. The church is mentioned on a list of churches Willibrord, the Apostle to the Frisians, inhered to the Abbey of Echternach.

In 1018, Vlaardingen was a stronghold of Dirk III, who levied an illegal toll on ships on the Maas river. An army sent by German Emperor Henry II to stop this practice was defeated by Dirk III in the (First) Battle of Vlaardingen. In 1047, his successor Dirk IV repelled another such attack (Second Battle of Vlaardingen). The first of these battles was commemorated in 2018 by a historical reenactment.

A flood disaster of December 21, 1163 (Saint Thomas Flood), ended the growth of Vlaardingen. The Counts of Holland moved away and its development stagnated.

In 1273, Vlaardingen was granted town privileges by Floris V, Count of Holland. Older town privileges are possible, but not provable.

In 1574, during the Eighty Years War of Dutch independence, a group of Watergeuzen burnt down Vlaardingen as commanded by William of Orange to prevent the Spanish from capturing the town. Vlaardingen later became a shipbuilding area and a significant harbour for the herring fishing industry. The fishing boats (originally "haringbuizen", later also "sloepen" and "loggers") ceased to use Vlaardingen in the years after World War II.

In 1855, the former municipality of Zouteveen was merged into the municipality Vlaardingerambacht which in turn was merged with Vlaardingen in 1941 during the German occupation of the Netherlands.

Because of industrialization in and close to Vlaardingen, the town suffered from heavy air pollution and, sometimes, pathogenic smog during the 1970s. One day, a high school had to be closed because of the smog. Many environmental groups arose in and around Vlaardingen as it was seen as one of the most polluted cities of the country.

Vlaardingen consists of eight districts/neighbourhoods:

1. Vlaardingen Centrum
2. Westwijk
3. Vettenoordse polder (includes industry)
4. Vlaardingen Oost
5. Ambacht/Babberspolder
6. Holy Zuid
7. Holy Noord
8. Broekpolder

== Politics ==
Seats in the town council after the municipal elections in 2026:

- ONS.Vlaardingen, 11 seats
- Groenlinks (GL)/Labour Party (PvdA), 5 seats
- Vlaardingen Ahead 2000/Livable Vlaardingen (VV2000/LV), 3 seats
- Democrats 66 (D66), 3 seats
- People's Party for Freedom and Democracy (VVD), 2 seats
- HEEL DE STAD, 2 seats
- DENK, 2 seats
- Christian Democratic Appeal (CDA), 2 seats
- Beter voor Vlaardingen, 2 seats
- Christian Union/Political Reformed Party (CU/SGP), 1 seat
- 50PLUS, 1 seat
- Socialist Party (SP), 1 seat

The mayor is Frederik Zevenbergen (VVD).

== Economy ==
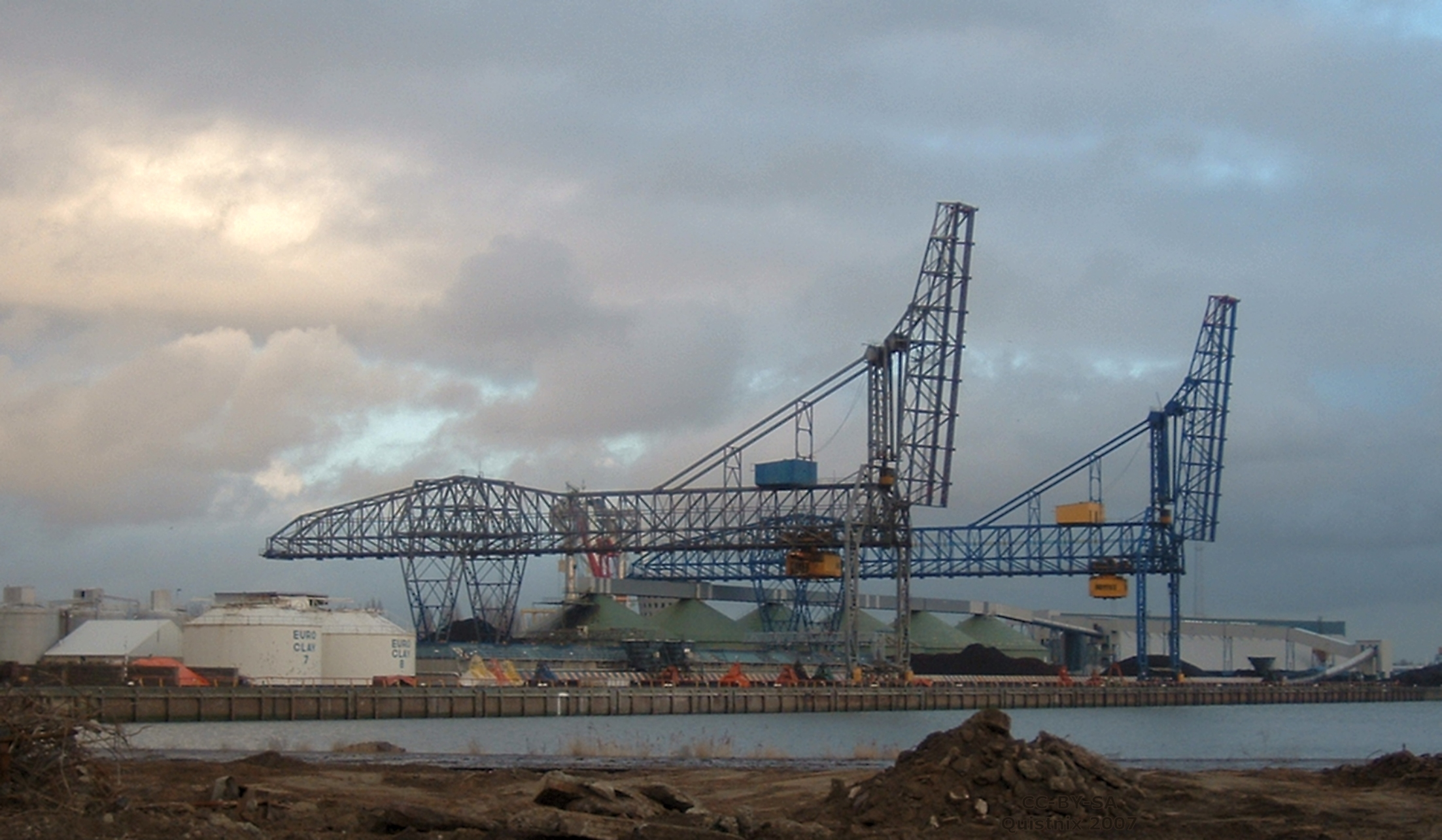
The 2 Vlaardingse ertskranen in the Vulcaanhaven.

There are ship repair business(es) in Eastern Vlaardingen beside the Nieuwe Maas River. The Vulcaanhaven was for many years the largest privately owned artificial harbour in the world. The last major herring factory, Warmelo & Van Der Drift, left Vlaardingen in the middle of 2012 to relocate to Katwijk aan Zee. There are still some ferry terminals (DFDS Seaways, sailing to Felixstowe and Immingham and P&O Ferries sailing to Hull).

== Attractions ==
=== Monuments ===
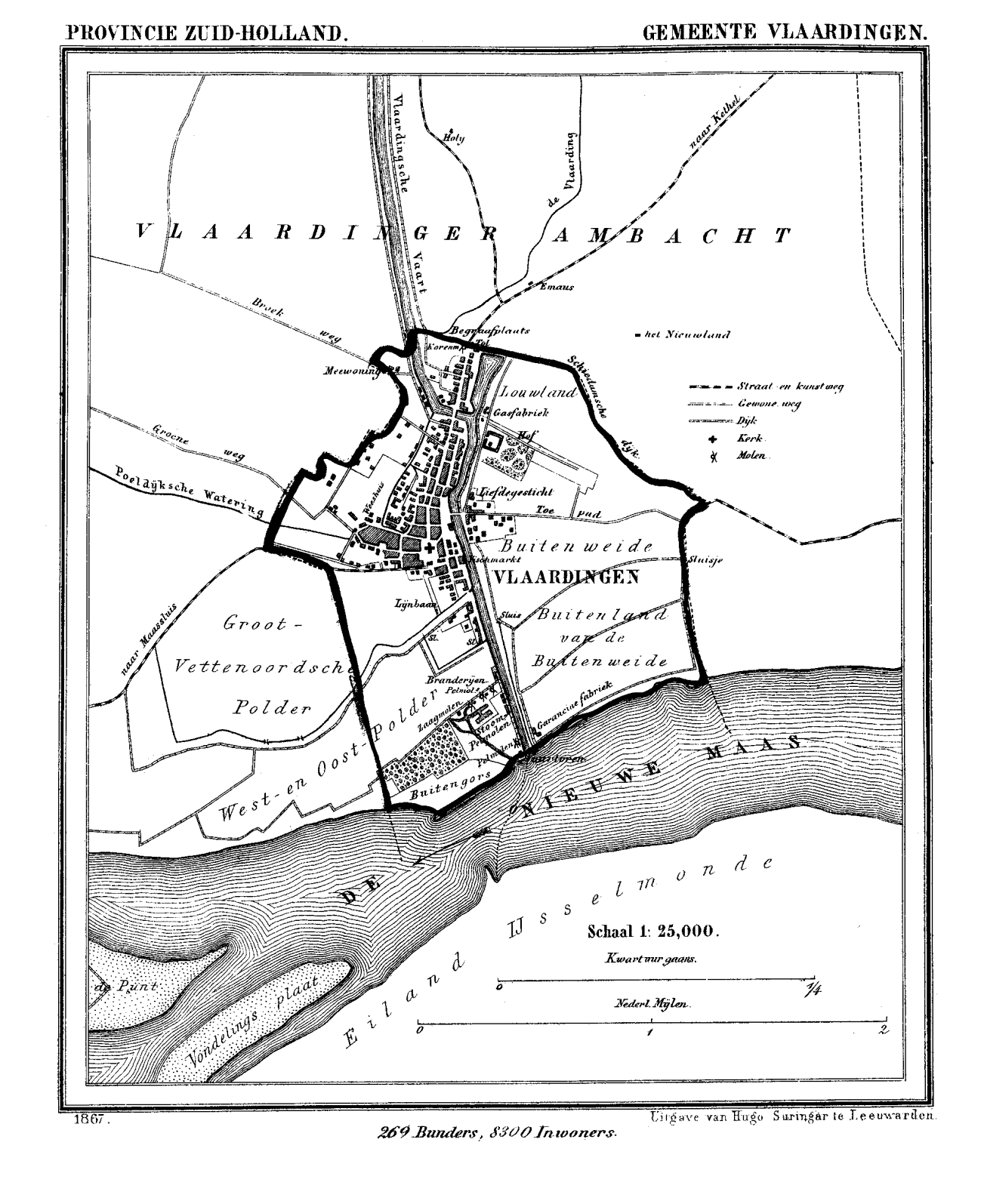
Vlaardingen in 1867

Historical buildings in the town include the Grote Kerk (Big Church), the Waag (Weighing Bridge) next to the church and the old town hall (used for weddings), all on the Markt, the former marketplace, the Visbank (Fish Auction) at the harbour and the Oude Lijnbaan (Old Ropewalk, where ropes were made). The Grote Kerk was probably established between 1156 and 1164 and has been expanded, damaged and rebuilt. To the north of the old harbour is the old Aeolus windmill, which operates and sells ground cereals. The harbour is a marina and open-air museum with old ships. At the harbour is the Museum Vlaardingen (before: Visserijmuseum and the Visserij en Vlaardings Museum), a museum dedicated to commercial sea fishing and lore. A memorial to the crew of a Wellington bomber from No. 142 Squadron RAF, killed when it was shot down over Vlaardingen in March 1942, was erected in Wijkpark Holy-Noord in June 2012.

On Emaus Cemetery in Vlaardinger Ambacht six members of the resistance group "Geuzen" are buried. They were executed in March 1941. Nine adjacent headstones represent nine other members of the "Geuzen" who were also executed and buried elsewhere.

=== Events ===
The "Vlaardings Loggerfestival" (Logger is a traditional ship used for herring fishery, the customary English name is lugger) is held on the first Saturday of June. The festival used to be called "Haring en Bierfeest" (translation: herring and beer festival), but in 2003 the mayor decided to rename it. In 2015, the name "Haring en Bierfeest" reappeared again.

Since 1987, the Geuzenpenning is an award that is yearly bestowed by a local foundation in cooperation with the town's municipality to human rights activists from all over the world.

== Notable residents ==
People who are born in or (have) lived in Vlaardingen:

=== Counts of Holland ===
- Floris I, Count of Holland (ca.1017–1061) Count of Holland then called Frisia, 1049-1061
- Dirk IV, Count of Holland (ca.1025–1049) was Count of Holland 1039–1049, then called Frisia
- Dirk V, Count of Holland (1052–1091) was Count of Holland 10611091, then called Frisia
- Floris II, Count of Holland (ca.1085–1121) Count of Holland 1091–1121

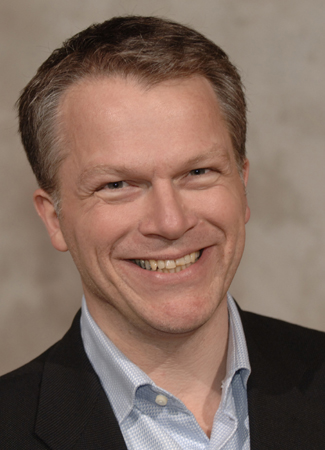
Wouter Bos, 2007

=== Public service ===
- Gerard Callenburgh (1642–1722) was a Dutch admiral and town councillor and Burgomaster
- Koos Vorrink (1891–1955) a Dutch politician
- Cornelis Moerman (1893–1988) a general practitioner who devised Moerman Therapy
- Catharina Halkes (1920–2011) a Dutch theologian and feminist
- Dirk Hoogendam (1922–2003) a Dutch war criminal
- Geert Mak (born 1946) a Dutch journalist and a non-fiction writer about history
- Agnes van Ardenne (born 1950) a retired Dutch politician and diplomat
- Wouter Bos (born 1963) a retired Dutch politician, former Deputy Prime Minister 2007–2010
- Kees van der Staaij (born 1968) a Dutch politician
- Arjan El Fassed (born 1973) a former Dutch politician, human rights activist, aid worker and director of Open State Foundation

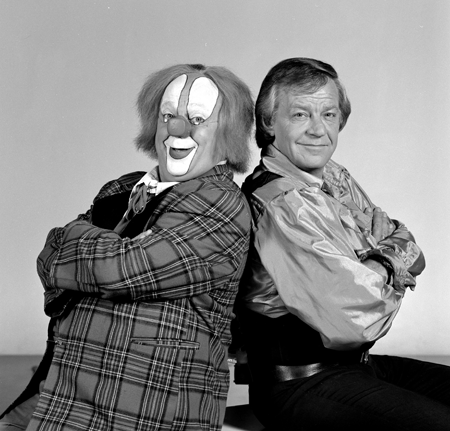
Bassie & Adriaan, 1990

=== The arts ===
- Dolf van der Linden (1915–1999) a Dutch conductor of popular music
- Bassie en Adriaan, (brothers, born 1935 & 1942) actors in their own children's TV show
- Gerrit Berveling (born 1944) a Dutch Esperanto author
- Threes Anna (born 1959) a novelist, theatre and film maker
- Hans Neleman (born 1960) an international photographer and film director from Connecticut
- Martyn LeNoble (born 1969) a Dutch bassist and a founding member of the alternative rock band Porno for Pyros
- Karen Mulder (born 1970) a Dutch model, singer and former supermodel
- Rik van de Westelaken (born 1971) a Dutch TV presenter
- Rajacenna van Dam (born 1994) a Dutch hyper realistic pencil drawing artist

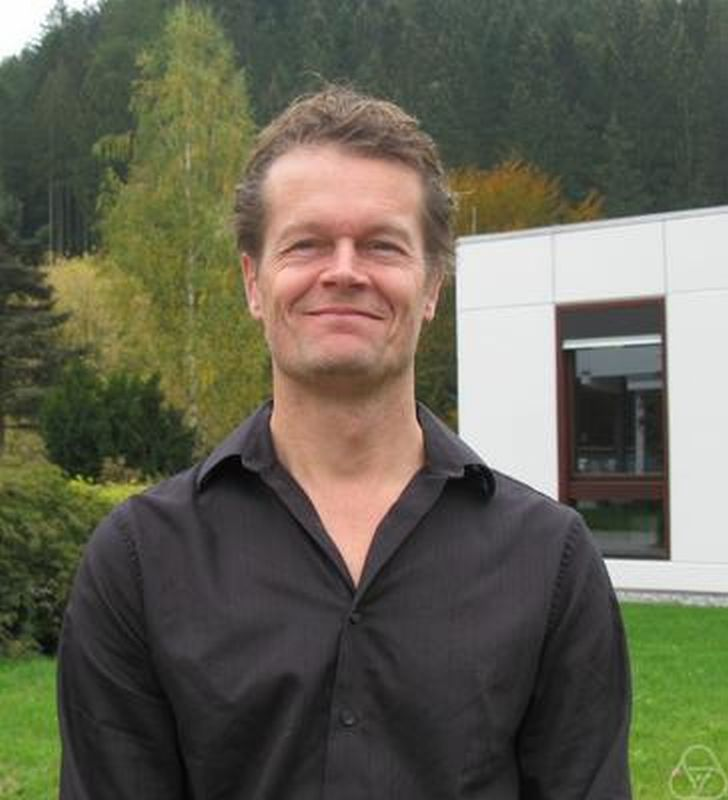
Aad van der Vaart, 2011

=== Science & business ===
- Ericus Verkade (1835–1907) a businessman, founded Verkade manufacturing company
- Hans Bos (born 1950) a biochemist, cancer researcher and academic
- Aart de Geus (born 1954) co-founder and CEO of Synopsys
- Roel Pieper (born 1956) an IT-entrepreneur
- Aad van der Vaart (born 1959) a professor of stochastics at Leiden University
- Menno Schilthuizen (born 1965) an evolutionary biologist, ecologist and academic researcher
- Jim Stolze (born 1973) a tech-entrepreneur at Amsterdam Science Park and with TEDx

=== Sport ===
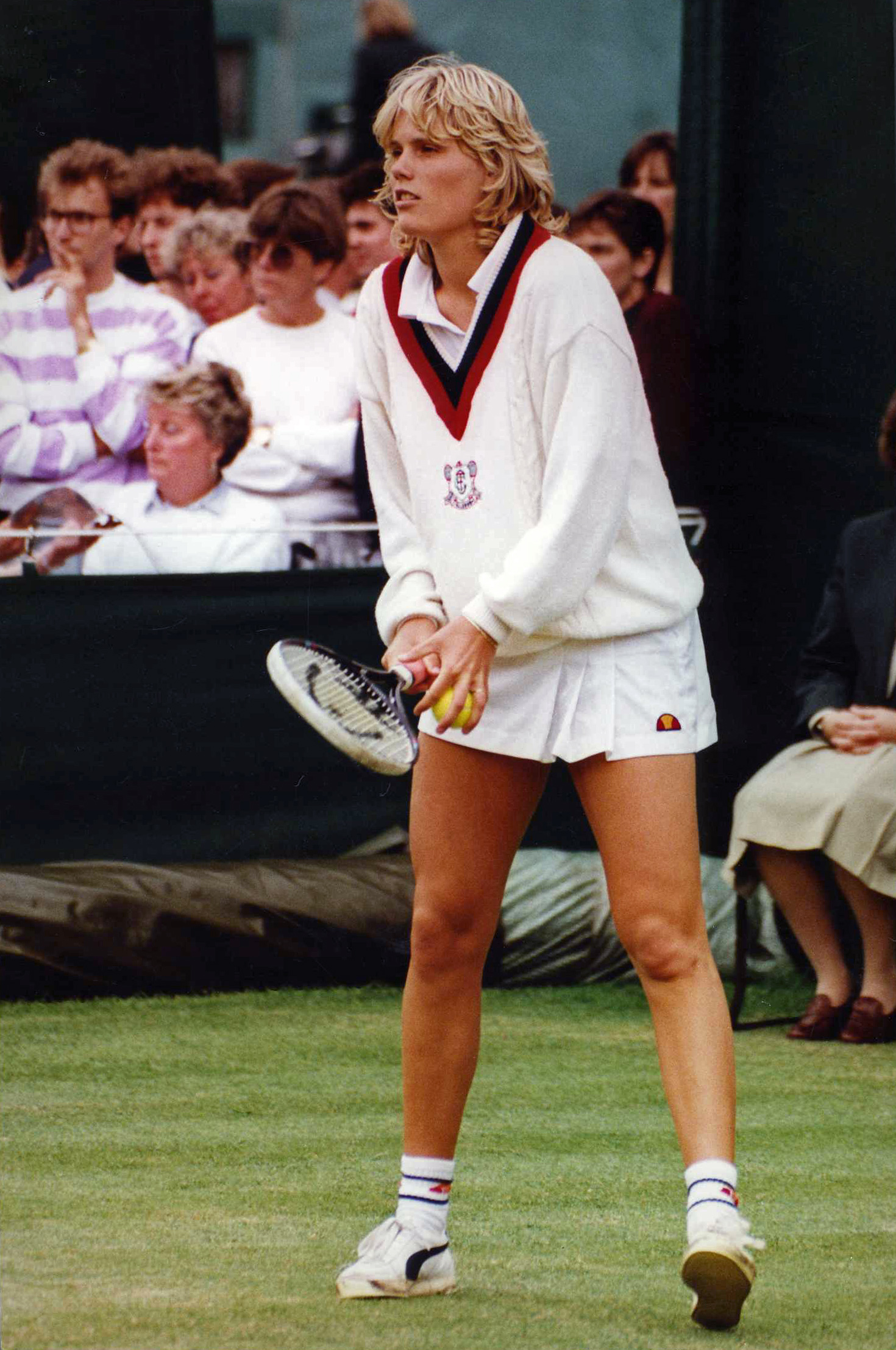
Caroline Vis, 1989

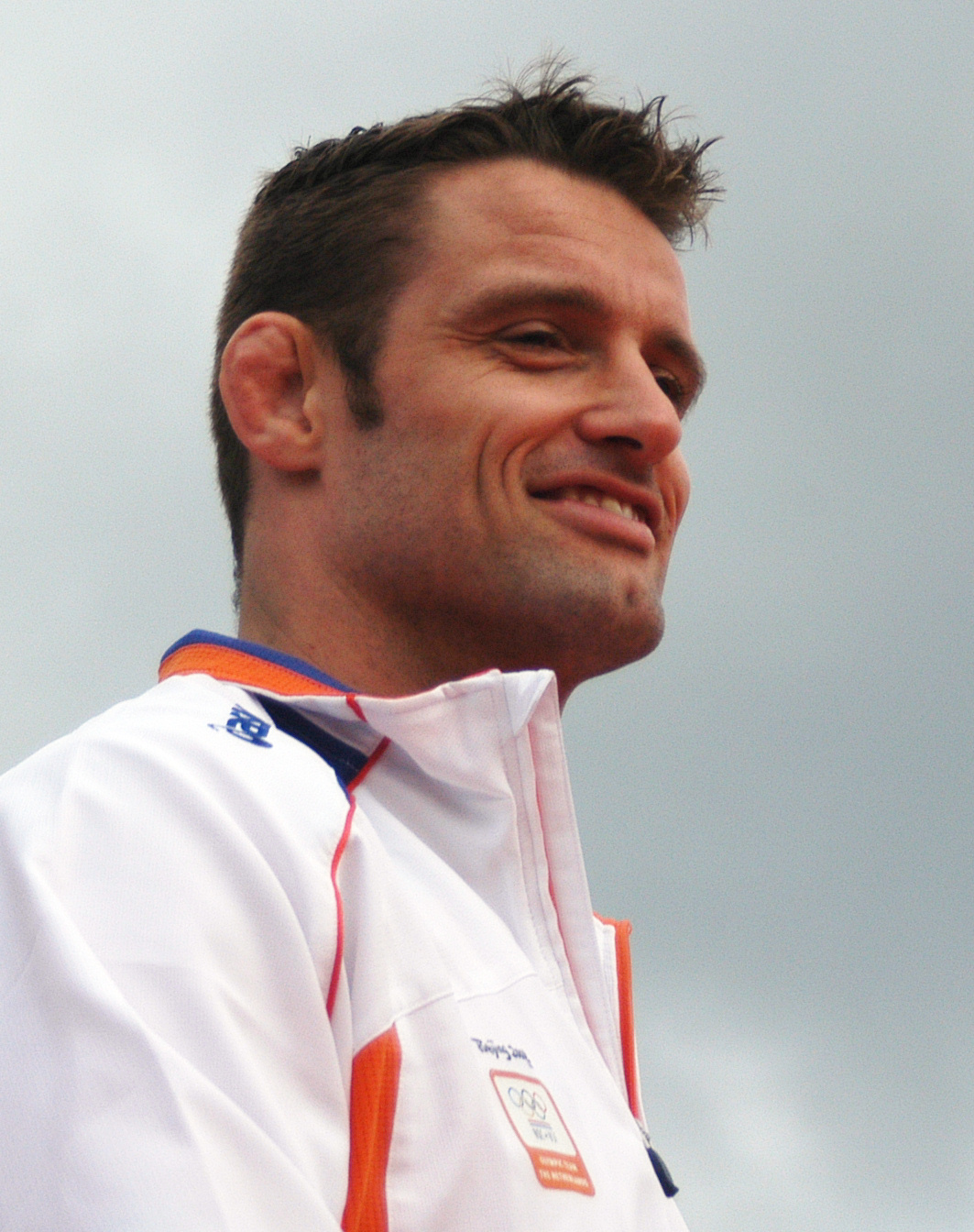
Mark Huizinga, 2008

- Andries Hoogerwerf (1906–1977) a middle-distance runner in the 1928 Summer Olympics, later a scientist and conservationist in the Dutch East Indies
- Rudie Liebrechts (born 1941) a Dutch former speed skater and racing cyclist
- Paul-Jan Bakker (born 1957) a former Dutch cricketer
- Juliette Bergmann (born 1958) a Dutch female bodybuilding former champion
- Wim Koevermans (born 1960) a former football central defender with 340 club caps
- Harald Wapenaar (born 1970) a Dutch former football goalkeeper with 341 club caps
- Caroline Vis (born 1970) a retired professional tennis player
- Frank Kooiman (born 1970) a retired Dutch football goalkeeper with about 310 club caps
- Wilma van Hofwegen (born 1971) a former freestyle swimmer, team silver medallist at the 2000 Summer Olympics
- Serge Zwikker (born 1973) a Dutch-American former basketball player.
- Mark Huizinga (born 1973) a Dutch judoka champion and gold medallist at the 2000 Summer Olympics and bronze medallist at the 1996 and 2004 Summer Olympics
- Daniëlle de Bruijn (born 1978) a water polo player, team gold medallist at the 2008 Summer Olympics
- Edith Bosch (born 1980) a Dutch judoka, silver medallist at the 2004 Summer Olympics and bronze medallist at the 2008 and 2012 Summer Olympics
- Chantal Achterberg (born 1985) a Dutch rower, team bronze medallist at the 2012 Summer Olympics and team silver medalist at the 2016 Summer Olympics
- Carlo van Dam (born 1986) a racing driver
- Junior Strous (born 1986) a racing driver
- Ian Maatsen (born 2002) a Dutch football player, who plays for Aston Villa
- Joy De Zeeuw (born 2006) professional tennis player

== Twin town ==
- Moravská Třebová in the Pardubice Region, Czech Republic.

== Gallery ==
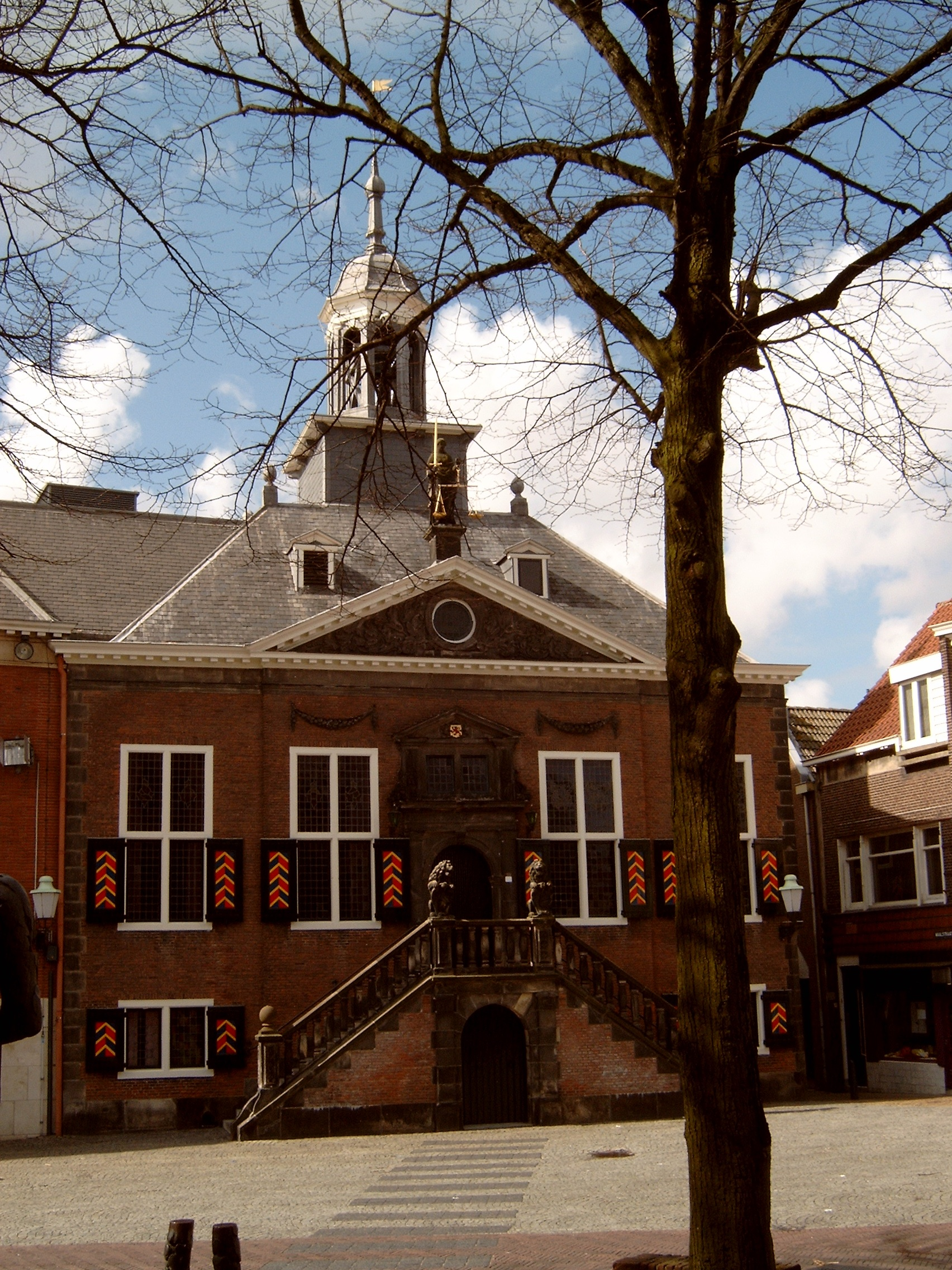
Old town hall 1650

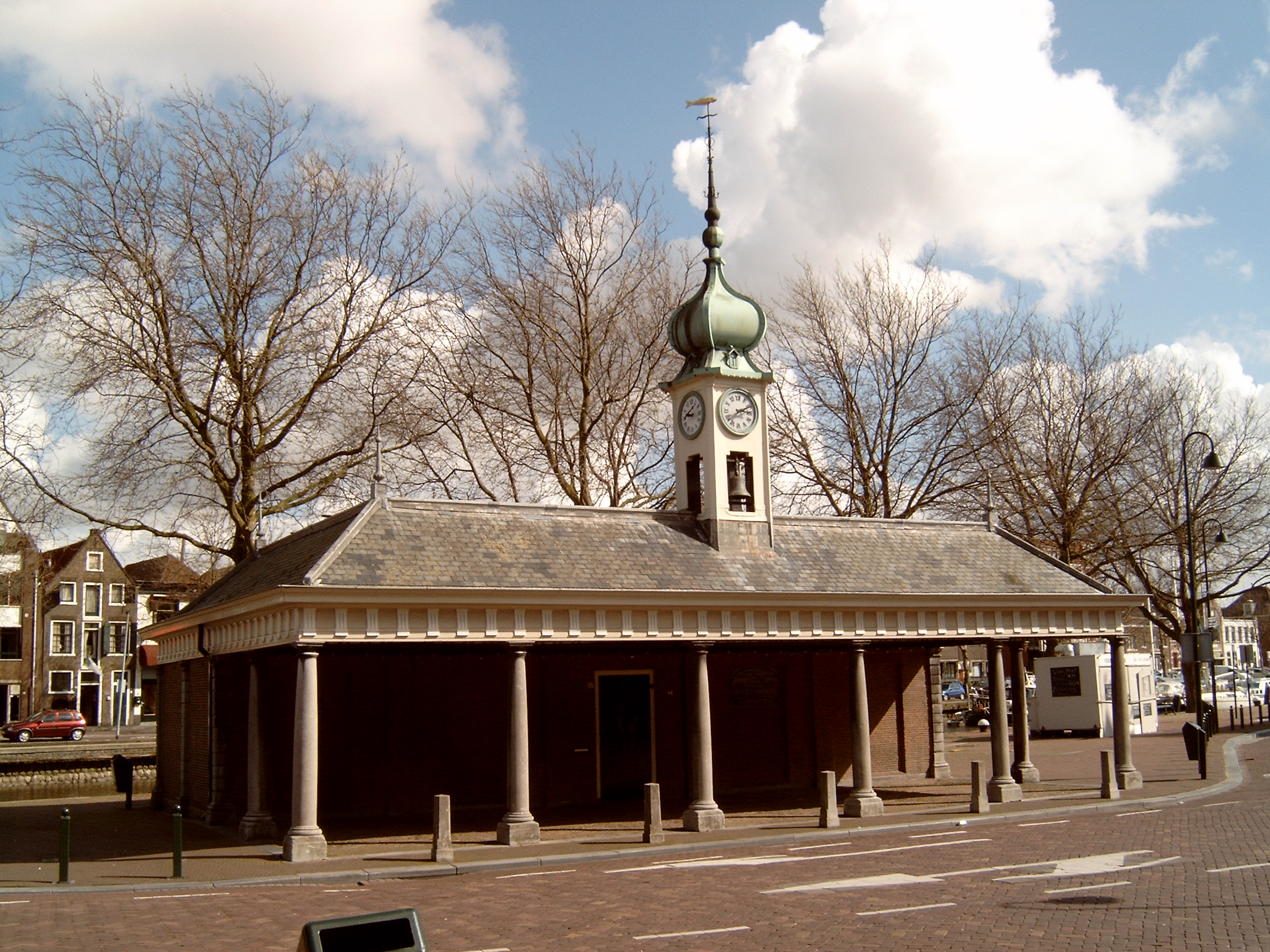
Visbank, covered fish market

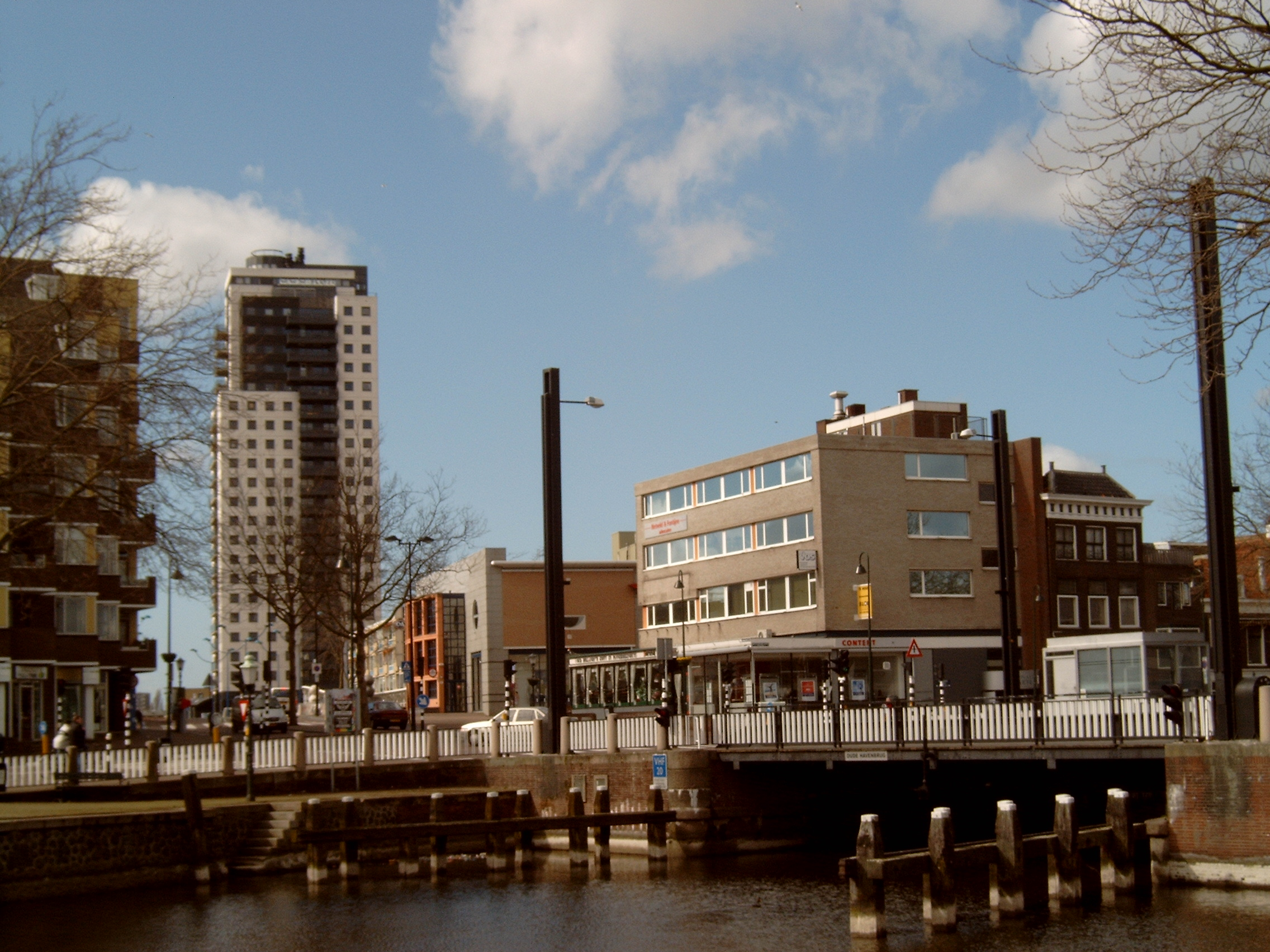
Oude Havenbrug

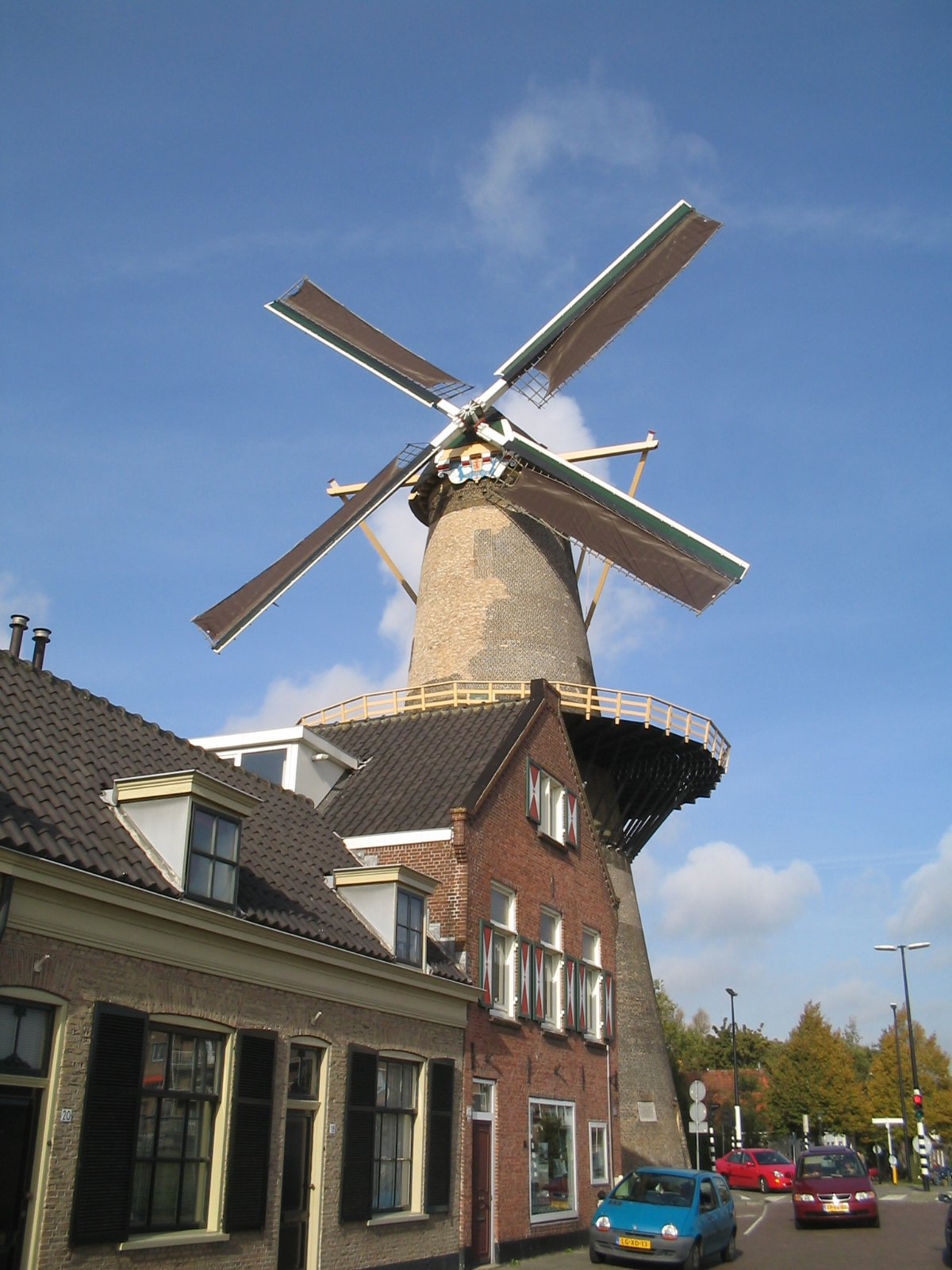
1790 windmill Aeolus

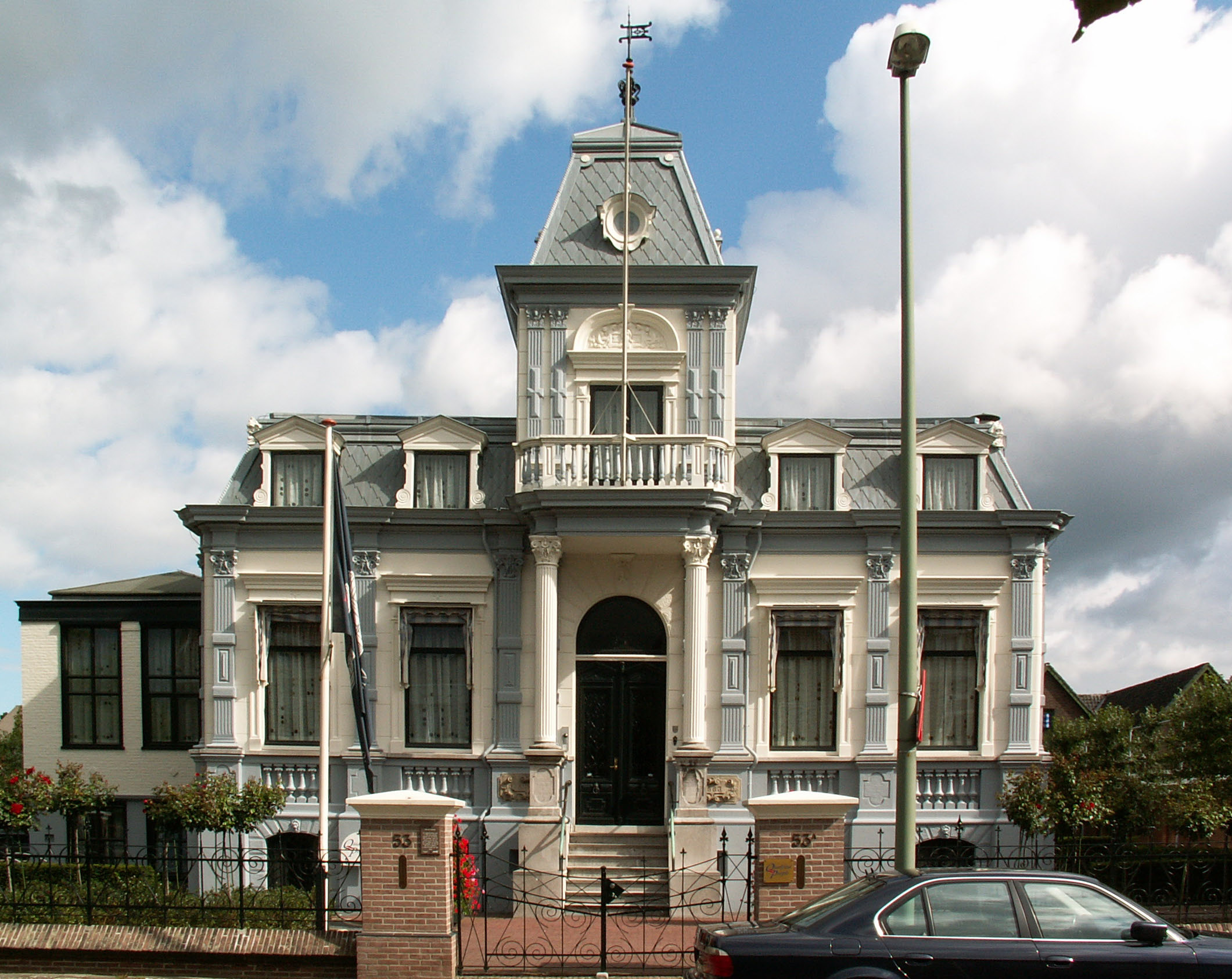
Villa "IJzermans" 1884 ship owners mansion

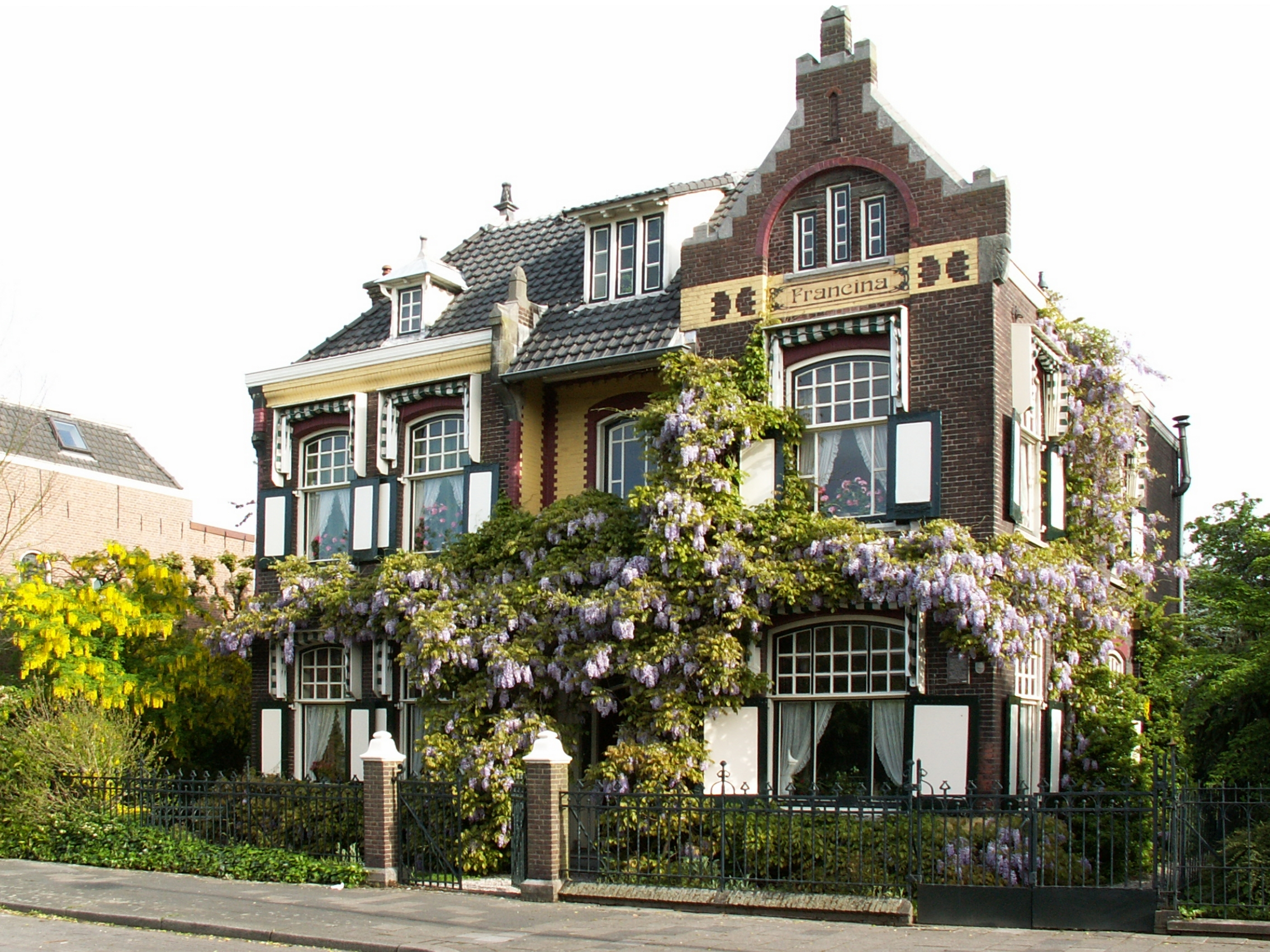
Villa "Francina" 1899 Art Nouveau mansion

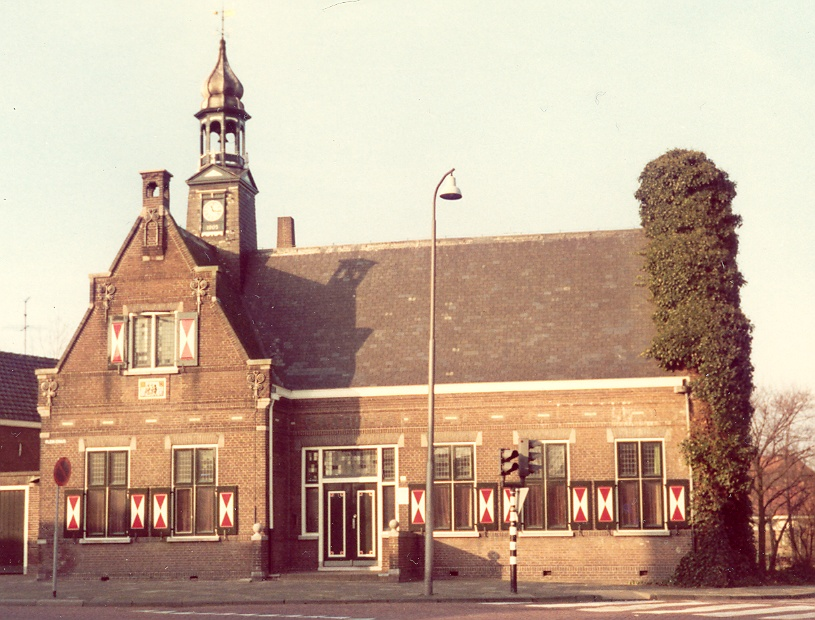
Municipal archive building, former town hall Vlaardingerambacht

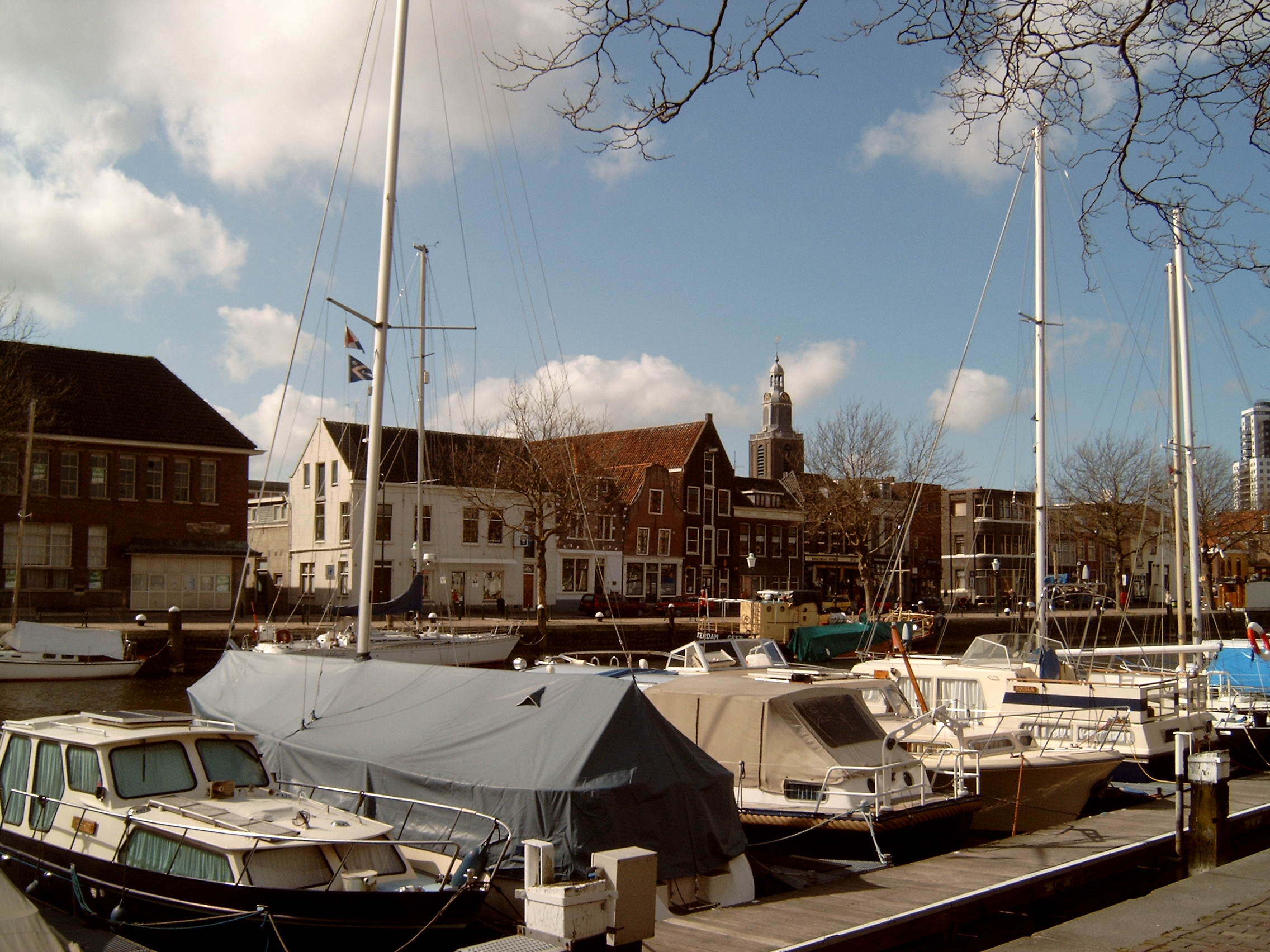
View of the harbour

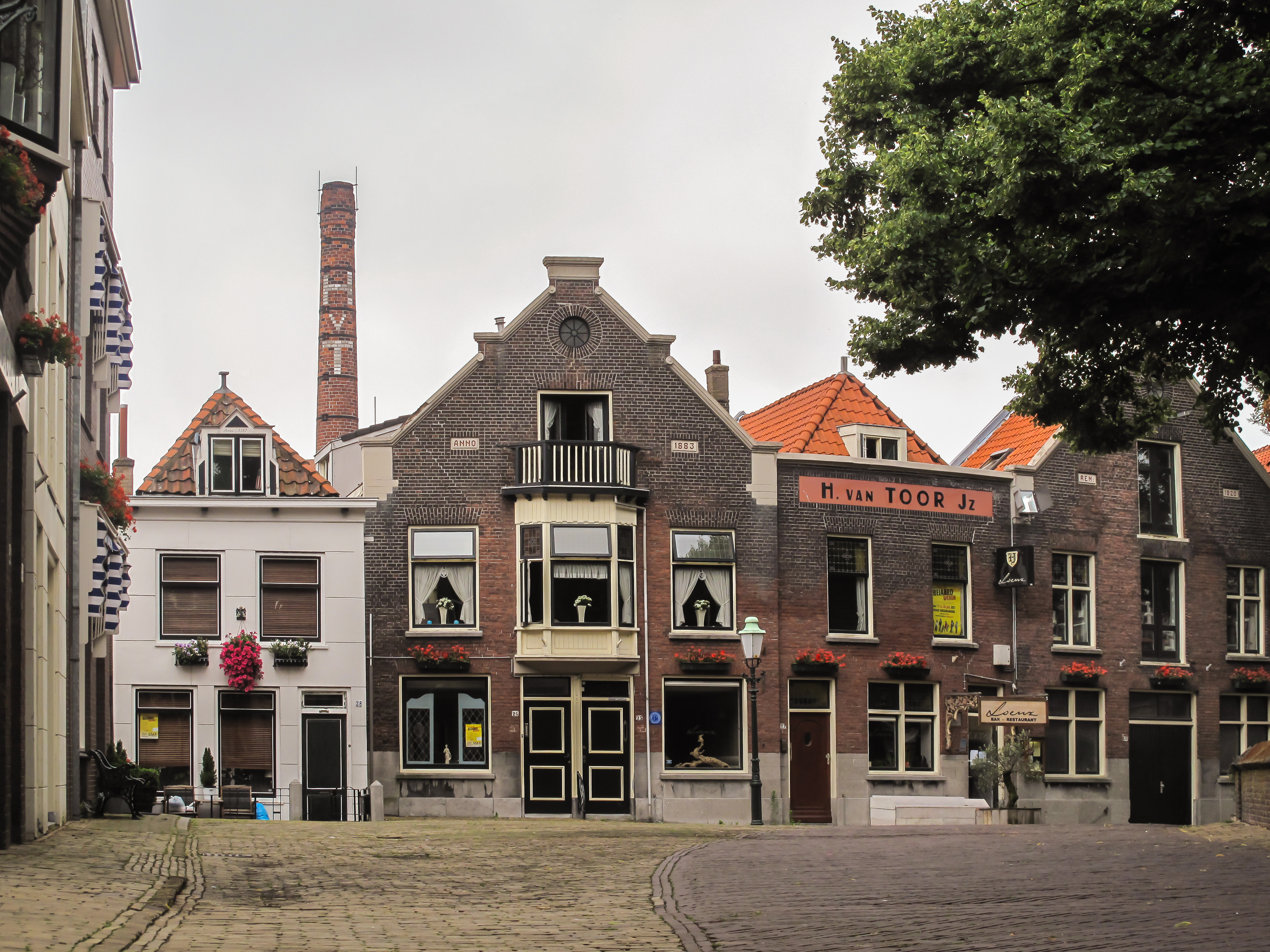
Office building: H van Toor

== See also ==
- Vlaardingse Vaart Bridge
