= Clifford (name) =

- Pronunciation: /ˈklɪfɜːrd/ KLIF-erd
- Gender: Male

Origin
- Language: Old English
- Meaning: Ford by a cliff

Other names
- Derivative: Cliff
- Related names: Clifton

Clifford is both a toponymic surname of English origin and a given name deriving from it. It originated in several English placenames meaning "ford by a cliff".

== People ==
=== Given name ===
- Clifford Andrews (1912–1973), English athlete in cricket
- Clifford Antone (1949–2006), American musical producer and club owner
- Clifford Warren Ashley (1881–1947), American artist, author
- Clifford Bax (1886–1962), English author and playwright
- Alexander Clifford Beauglehole (1920–2002), known as "Cliff" Beauglehole, Australian farmer and naturalist
- Clifford Berry (1918–1963), American inventor
- Clifford Blackmore, Kansas politician
- Clifford Edmund Bosworth (1928–2015), English professor, historian
- Clifford Bricker (1904–1980), Canadian long-distance runner
- Clifford Brown (1930–1956), American musician (jazz trumpeter)
- Cliff Burton (1962–1986), American musician (bass guitarist, Metallica)
- Clifford Campbell (1892–1991), Jamaican political figure
- Clifford Carlson (1894–1964), American athlete in basketball
- Clifford Carter (born 1952), American musician
- Clifford P. Case (1904–1982), American attorney and political figure
- Clifford Chapin (born 1988), American voice actor working with Funimation
- Cliff Clavin, fictional character on the television series Cheers
- Cliff Couser (Clifford Couser, born 1971), American athlete in boxing
- Clifford Ann Creed (born 1938), American female athlete in golf
- Clifford Curry (1936–2016), American singer
- Cliff Curtis (born 1968), New Zealand Actor
- Clifford Curzon (1907–1982), English musician (piano)
- Clifford David (1938–2017), American actor
- Cliff Davies (musician) (1948–2008), English musician (rock drummer)
- Clifford Davis (politician) (1897–1970), American political figure
- Clifford Davis (music manager) (fl. 1960s–1980s), American musician and manager of musical groups
- Clifford Dupont (1905–1978), English-born political figure in Rhodesia
- Clifford Durr (1899–1975), American attorney and civil rights activist
- Clifford John Earle Jr. (1935–2017), American mathematician
- Clifford M. Eddy (C. M. Eddy Jr., 1896–1967), American author
- Cliff Edwards (footballer) (1921–1989), English footballer
- Clifford Evans (disambiguation), several people
- Clifford Forsythe (1929–2000), Northern Ireland political figure
- Clifford Brodie Frith (born 1949), English-born Australian ornithologist
- Cliff Garner (1937–2010), American racing driver
- Clifford Geertz (1926–2006), American anthropologist
- Clifford Goldstein (born 1955), American author, Seventh-day Adventist editor
- Clifford Goodman (1866–1911), Barbados athlete in cricket
- Chris Graham (boxer) (Clifford Graham, 1900–1986), Canadian boxer
- Clifford Scott Green (1923–2007), American judge
- Clifford Grey (1887–1941), British songwriter, actor (also known as Clifford Gray)
- Cliff Hagan (1931–2026), American basketball player
- Cliff Hammonds (born 1985), American basketball player
- Clifford Hansen (1912–2009), American politician
- Clifford Harper (born 1949), English illustrator, anarchist
- Clifford Joseph Harris Jr., known professionally as T.I. (born 1980), American musician and producer
- Clifford C. Hastings (1882–1946), New York politician
- Clifford Heatherley (1888–1937), English film actor
- Clifford Husbands (1926–2017), Barbados political figure
- Clifford Irving (1930–2017), American author
- Clifford Irving (politician) (1914–2004), British political figure (Isle of Man)
- Clifford Jarvis (1941–1997), American musician (rock drummer)
- Clifford Jordan (1931–1993), American musician (jazz saxophone)
- Cliff Kincaid (born 1954), American investigative journalist
- Clifford Alan King, American engineer
- Clifford Henry Benn Kitchin (C. H. B. Kitchin, 1895–1967), British author
- Clifford J. Laube (1891–1974), American Catholic poet, editor and publisher
- Clifford Lincoln (born 1928), Canadian political figure
- Carwood Lipton (Clifford Carwood Lipton, 1920–2001), British military figure
- Clifford Lofvegren (1903–1969), American businessman, farmer, and politician
- Clifford Longley, English journalist and author
- Clifford Lyne (born 1970), South African swimmer
- Clifford Sibusiso Mamba (born 1963), Swazi diplomat and former Olympic athlete
- Clifford J. MacGregor (1904–1985), American meteorologist, Arctic explorer and naval aviator
- Clifford May (born 1951), American author, political activist
- Cliff McWatt (Clifford McWatt, 1922–1997), West Indian athlete in cricket
- Clifford Meth (born 1961), American author
- Clifford Mulenga (born 1987), Zambian athlete in football
- Clifford Nass (1958–2013), American professor (Communications), author
- Clifford Odets (1906–1963), American playwright, screenwriter, social activist
- Clifford A. Pickover (born c. 1958), American mathematician, author
- Cliff Pilkey (Clifford Pilkey, 1928–2012), Canadian politician and trade union leader
- Clifford Joseph Purpur, known as Fido Purpur (1912–2001), American athlete in hockey
- Clifford Ray (born 1949), American athlete in basketball
- Cliff Robinson (basketball, born 1960), American athlete in basketball
- Clifford Robinson (basketball, born 1966), American athlete in basketball
- Clifford Rose (1929–2021), British actor
- Clifford Ross (born 1952), American artist
- Ronnie Shows (Clifford Ronald "Ronnie" Shows, born 1947), American political figure
- Clifford Shull (1915–2001), American physicist (Nobel Prize)
- Clifford Sifton (1861–1929), Canadian political figure
- Clifford D. Simak (1904–1988), American author (science fiction)
- Clifford Ian Simpson, known professionally as Kevin Abstract (born 1996), leader of boy band Brockhampton
- Clifford Smith, known professionally as Method Man (born 1971), American rap singer
- Cliff Spink (Clifford Spink, fl. 1980s-present), British military officer (Royal Air Force)
- Clifford Stein (born c. 1965), American computer scientist
- Clifford Stoll (born c. 1956), American astronomer, computer expert, author
- Clifford Taubes (born 1954), American mathematician
- Clifford Thornton (1939–1989), American musician (jazz trumpet, trombone)
- Clifford Joseph Trahan, known professionally as Johnny Rebel (singer) (1938–2016), American musician
- Clifford Truesdell (1919–2000), American mathematician, historian
- Clifford A. Ukkelberg (1904–1996), American farmer and politician
- Clifford Walker (cricketer) (1919–1992), British athlete in cricket
- Clifford B. Wilson (1879–1943), American political figure
- Clifford A. Wolff (born 1970), American attorney

=== Surname ===
- Henry Clifford, 10th Baron Clifford
- The Clifford family, an English noble family
- The Clifford family (bankers), a family of English bankers active in the Netherlands
- Alfred H. Clifford (1908–1992), American mathematician
- Anne Clifford (theologian) (1944–2024), American theologian
- Lady Anne Clifford (1590–1676), Countess of Pembroke
- Augustus Clifford (1788–1877), British naval officer and court official
- Bede Clifford (1890–1969), Governor of Mauritius from 1937 to 1942
- Betsy Clifford (born 1953), Canadian female athlete in skiing
- Reese Buzz Clifford (1941–2018), American pop singer and songwriter
- Charles Clifford (disambiguation), several people
- Sir Charles Clifford, 1st Baronet (1813–1893), New Zealand politician
- Clark Clifford (1906–1998), American Secretary of Defense
- Conor Clifford (born 1991), Irish athlete in football
- Daniel Clifford (disambiguation) (or Dan), several people
- Dermot Clifford (born 1939), English religious figure
- Dennis Clifford (born 1992), American basketball player
- Doug Clifford (born 1945), American musician, member of Creedence Clearwater Revival
- Edward Clifford (1844–1907), English artist and author
- Eleanor Clifford, Countess of Cumberland (Born Eleanor Brandon, 1519–1547), English noblewoman
- Esmond Clifford (1895–1970), British Royal Engineers officer
- Francis Clifford (author) (1917–1975), pen name of Arthur Leonard Bell Thompson, author
- George Clifford (disambiguation), several people
- George Clifford (footballer) (1896–?), English athlete in cricket
- George Clifford III, who engaged the Swedish naturalist Carl von Linné to write Hortus Cliffortianus
- Gerald Francis Clifford (1889–1952), Wisconsin lawyer, politician and executive of the Green Bay Packers
- Gordon Clifford (rugby league), Australian rugby league footballer
- Gordon Clifford (lyricist) (1902–1968), American lyricist
- Graeme Clifford (born 1942), Australian film editor
- Grahame Clifford (1905–1984), English opera singer
- Henry Clifford, 1st Earl of Cumberland (1493–1542), British member of nobility in Skipton
- Henry Hugh Clifford (1826–1883), British army officer
- Howard J. Clifford (fl. 1930s), American political figure in Michigan
- Hugh Clifford (colonial administrator) (1866–1941), British colonial administrator
- Hughie Clifford (1866–1929), Scottish athlete in football
- Jack Clifford (disambiguation), several people
- James Clifford (historian) (born 1945), American university professor in California
- James Clifford (musician) (1622–1698), English religious figure and musician
- Jo Clifford (born 1951), British playwright
- John Clifford (disambiguation), several people
- John Clifford, 9th Baron Clifford (1435–1461), British military leader
- John Clifford (choreographer), former New York City Ballet principal dancer
- John Garry Clifford (1942–2014), American historian
- Johnny Clifford (1934–2007), Irish athlete in hurling
- Joyce Clifford (1935–2011), founder of primary nursing
- J. R. Clifford (1848–1933), American attorney, civil rights pioneer
- Kyle Clifford (born 1991), Canadian ice hockey player
- Linda Clifford (born 1944), American female musician and singer
- Lucy Clifford (1846–1929), British female author
- Margaret Clifford, Countess of Cumberland (born Margaret Russell, 1560–1616), English noblewoman
- Max Clifford (1943–2017), English publicist
- Michael Gordon Clifford (born 1995), Australian guitarist from the band 5 Seconds of Summer
- Michael R. Clifford (1952–2021), American astronaut
- Mike Clifford (born 1943), American singer-songwriter and actor
- Nathan Clifford (1803–1881), American statesman, diplomat and jurist
- Nique Clifford (born 2002), American basketball player
- Patrick Clifford (disambiguation), several people
- Paul Clifford (cricketer) (born 1976), English athlete in cricket
- Richard Clifford (died 1421), British religious figure
- Robert Clifford (disambiguation), several people
- Rosamund Clifford (c. 1150 – 1176), "Fair Rosamund", mistress of Henry II of England
- Ross Clifford (born 1951), Australian radio personality, author
- Sean Clifford (born 1998), American football player
- Sian Clifford (born 1982), English actress
- Sigerson Clifford (born Edward Bernard Clifford, 1913-1985), Irish poet, playwright and civil servant
- Simon Clifford (born 1970), English football coach
- Stormy Daniels (born 1979), American pornstar, real name Stephanie A. Gregory Clifford
- Thomas Clifford (disambiguation), several people
- Thomas Clifford, 1st Baron Clifford of Chudleigh (1630–1673), British politician and statesman
- Thomas Clifford, 14th Baron Clifford of Chudleigh (born 1948), a British baron
- Tom Clifford (politician) (fl. 1970s–2000s), Canadian political figure
- Trevor Clifford (1927–2019), Australian botanist
- Wayne Clifford (1944–2025), Canadian poet, editor and educator
- Wayne Clifford (rugby league) (born 1975), Australian rugby league footballer
- William Clifford (disambiguation), several people
- William Kingdon Clifford (1845–1879), English mathematician and philosopher

=== Fictional characters ===
- Clifford, the title name character in children book series Clifford the Big Red Dog
- Clifford DeVoe, also known as the Thinker, in DC Comics

== See also ==
- Baron Clifford
- Baron de Clifford
- Clifford baronets
- Lord Clifford (disambiguation)
