= Cliff (disambiguation) =

A cliff is a vertical, or near vertical, rock exposure.

Cliff, The Cliff or The Cliffs may also refer to:

== Buildings ==
- Cliff Brewery, a former brewery near Ipswich, England
- Cliff Palace, largest cliff dwelling in North America
- The Cliffs, a historic house in Philadelphia, Pennsylvania
- Cargill's Castle in Dunedin, New Zealand, formally known as The Cliffs

== Places ==
- Cliff, Kentucky, an unincorporated community
- Cliff, Lewis, a settlement in the Outer Hebrides, Scotland
- Cliff Village, Missouri, a small village
- Cliff, New Mexico, an unincorporated community
- Cliff Township, Custer County, Nebraska
- The Cliff, Salford, a residential area in the City of Salford, England

== Geographic features ==
- Cliff Island, Maine, an island
- Lake Cliff, a freshwater lake in Dallas, Texas
- Cliff Mountain (New York), a 3944-foot mountain

== People and fictional characters ==
- Cliff (surname), a list of people
- Cliff (given name), a list of people and fictional characters

== Entertainment ==
- The Cliff (EP), an EP by Pelican
- "Cliff", a Russian song by Alexander Navrotsky, famously performed by Leonid Kharitonov in 1965
- Cliff (album), the 1959 debut album by Cliff Richard
- "The Cliff", a short story by Charles Baxter (author)
- "Cliffs", a 2018 track by Toby Fox from Deltarune Chapter 1 OST from the video game Deltarune
- "Cliff" a song by Jay Chou from the 2003 album Yeh Hui-Mei
- The Cliff (film), a 2016 Spanish thriller film

== Cyclones ==
- Cyclone Cliff (1981), struck Queensland on February 14, 1981
- Cyclone Cliff (1992), South Pacific cyclone; did not make landfall
- Cyclone Cliff (2007), South Pacific cyclone; caused severe damage on Fiji

== Other uses ==
- Spectrally prominent organics, organics-type ("Cliff type TNO"), a type of trans-Neptunian object based on their spectra
- Cliff College, a Christian theological college in Derbyshire
- The Cliff (cosmological object), a little red dot with an exceptional (and cliff-like) Balmer jump
- The Cliff (Emory), a shuttle bus system at Emory University near Atlanta
- Cliff mine, a defunct copper mine in Michigan
- The Cliff (training ground), a sports ground in Salford, Greater Manchester, England
- Community-Led Infrastructure Finance Facility (CLIFF), a finance facility managed by Homeless International

== See also ==
- Cliffe (disambiguation)
- Kliff (disambiguation)
- Cliffy (disambiguation)
- CLIF (disambiguation)
