= Cliff (surname) =

Cliff is an English surname. Notable people with the surname include:

- Alfred Cliff (1878–1966), English amateur cricketer
- Clarice Cliff (1899–1972), British ceramic artist
- Dave Cliff (born 1944), British jazz musician
- Ian Cliff (born 1952), British diplomat
- Jimmy Cliff, stage name of Jamaican reggae singer and musician James Chambers (1944–2025)
- John Cliff (trade unionist) (1883–1977), British transport executive
- John Cliff (actor) (1918–2001), American actor
- John MacFarlane Cliff (1921–1972), British physician
- Leslie Cliff (figure skater) (1908–1969), British pair skater
- Leslie Cliff (swimmer) (born 1955), Canadian swimmer
- Michelle Cliff (1946–2016), Jamaican-American author
- Nigel Cliff (born 1969), English historian, biographer and critic
- Norman Cliff (born 1930), American psychology professor
- Tony Cliff (1917–2000), Jewish Trotskyist activist

== See also ==
- Bernard Shir-Cliff (1924–2017), American editor
- Sarah Kliff, American journalist
- Cliff (disambiguation)
- Cliff (given name)
