= Cliff (given name) =

- Gender: Male

Origin
- Origin: Old English

Other names
- Related names: Clifford, Clifton

Cliff is a masculine given name. It is usually a short form of Clifford or, less frequently, Clifton. It may refer to:

== People ==
=== Actors ===
- Cliff Arquette (1905–1974), American comedian and actor
- Cliff Curtis (born 1968), New Zealand actor and producer
- Cliff DeYoung, American actor
- Cliff Parisi (born 1960), British actor and EastEnders star born Clifford R Manley
- Cliff Robertson (1923–2011), American actor

=== Artists ===
- Cliff Lee (potter) (born 1951), Taiwanese-American ceramic artist
- Cliff Robinson (artist) (born 1962), British comic book artist
- Cliff Whiting (1936–2017), New Zealand artist

=== Athletes ===
- Cliff Anderson (1944–2021), American basketball player
- Cliff Anderson (American football) (1929–1979), American football player
- Cliff Avril (born 1986), American football player
- Cliff Baldwin (1899–1979), American football player
- Cliff Barker (1921–1998), American basketball player
- Cliff Bayer (born 1977), American foil fencer
- Cliff Branch (1948–2019), American football player
- Cliff Curtis (baseball) (1881–1943), American Major League Baseball pitcher
- Cliff Edwards (footballer) (1921–1989), English footballer
- Cliff Fletcher (born 1935), Canadian ice hockey executive and former general manager
- Cliff Floyd (born 1972), American baseball player
- Cliff Garner (1937–2010), American racing driver
- Cliff Hardy (American football) (born 1947), American football player
- Cliff Harris (born 1948), American football player
- Cliff Thorburn (born 1948), Canadian snooker player
- Cliff Lee (born 1978), American Major League Baseball pitcher
- Cliff Lee (outfielder) (1896–1980), American Major League Baseball outfielder
- Cliff Olander (born 1955), American football player
- Cliff Morgan (1930–2013), Welsh rugby union footballer and later BBC commentator and broadcaster
- Cliff Morgan (footballer) (1913–1975), English footballer
- Cliff Politte (born 1974), American former Major League Baseball relief pitcher
- Cliff Pritchard (1882–1954), Welsh rugby union footballer
- Cliff Robinson (basketball, born 1960), American basketball player
- Clifford Robinson (basketball, born 1966), American basketball player
- Cliff Ronning (born 1965), Canadian ice hockey player
- Cliff Toney (born 1958), American football player
- Cliff Wiley (born 1955), American sprinter

=== Musicians ===
- Cliff Barrows (1923–2016), music and program director for the Billy Graham Evangelistic Association
- Cliff Burton (1962–1986), former bassist of the band Metallica
- Cliff Edwards (1895–1971), American singer, musician and actor
- Cliff Martinez (born 1954), American film score composer
- Cliff Richard, British singer born Harry Rodger Webb (born 1940)
- Cliff Williams (born 1949), bassist of the rock band AC/DC

=== Others ===
- Cliff Bleszinski, game designer
- Cliff Bole, American and Canadian television director
- Cliff Michelmore, British television presenter
- Cliff Sloan, American lawyer and academic
- Cliff Tan, Singaporean architect and author
- Cliff Zauner (died 2020), American politician

== Fictional characters ==
- Cliff Barnes, from the TV drama Dallas
- Cliff Clavin, in the Cheers TV series

== See also ==
- Kliff Kingsbury (born 1979), American football coach and former player
- Cliff (surname)
