= Georg Dionysius Ehret =

German scientist and illustrator (1708-1770)

George Dionysius Ehret
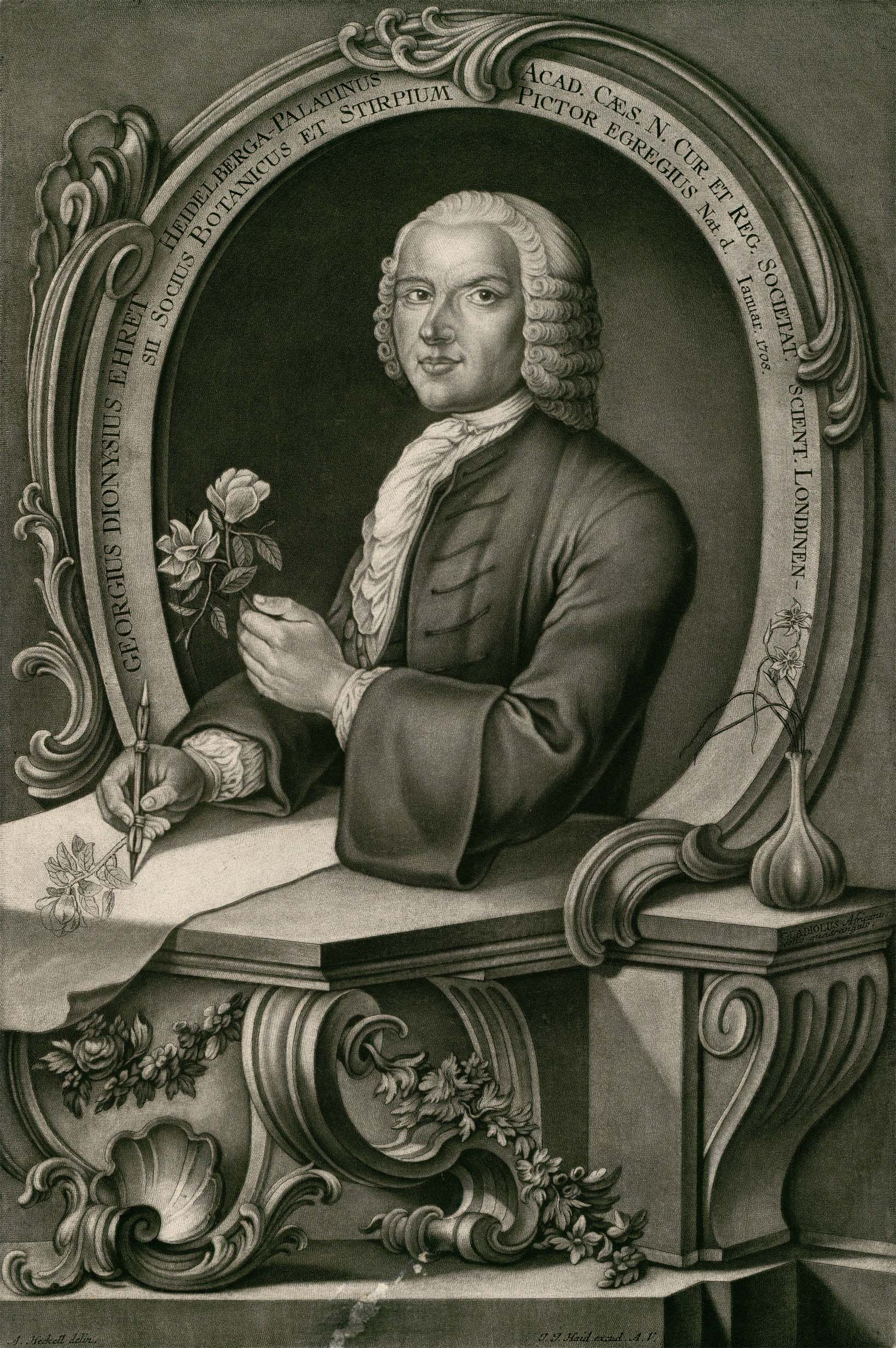
- Born: 30 January 1708
- Died: 9 September 1770 (aged 62)
- Known for: botanical illustrations

Georg Dionysius Ehret (30 January 1708 – 9 September 1770) was a German botanist and entomologist known for his botanical illustrations.

== Life ==
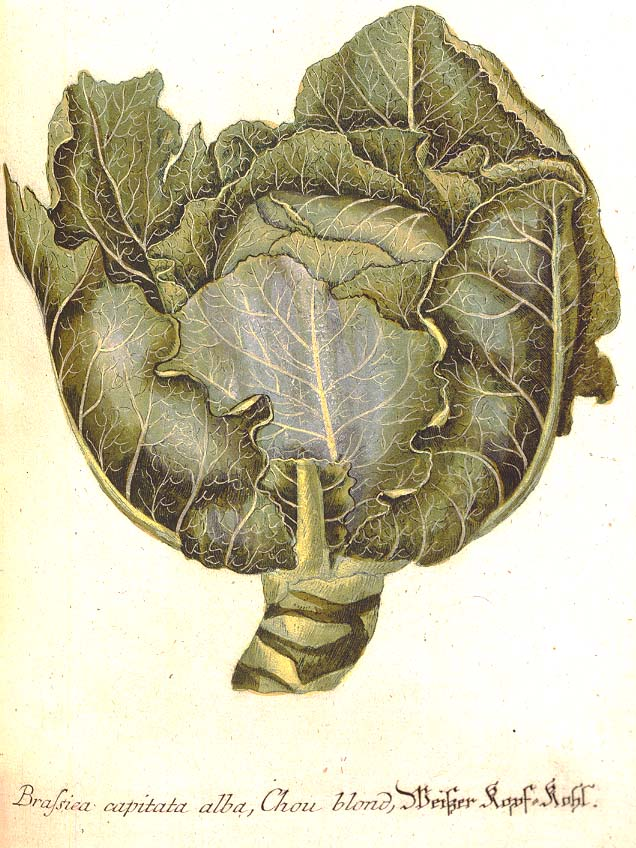
Brassica capitata, by Georg Dionysius Ehret

Ehret was born in Germany to Ferdinand Christian Ehret, a gardener and competent draughtsman, and Anna Maria Ehret. Beginning his working life as a gardener's apprentice near Heidelberg, he became one of the most influential European botanical artists of all time. His first illustrations were in collaboration with Carl Linnaeus and George Clifford in 1735-1736. Clifford, a wealthy Dutch banker and governor of the Dutch East India Company was a keen botanist with a large herbarium. He had the income to attract the talents of botanists such as Linnaeus and artists like Ehret. Together at the Clifford estate, Hartecamp, which is located south of Haarlem in Heemstede near Bennebroek, they produced Hortus Cliffortianus in 1738, a masterpiece of early botanical literature.

As a result of exploitation by Johann Wilhelm Weinmann, Ehret finished only 500 plates of a 1,000 plate commission and moved to England, where he was promoted by Sir Hans Sloane, Dr Mead and the bluestocking Duchess of Portland. "While he did not slavishly imitate what he saw, neither did he allow his feeling for the color and design of flowers distract him from the fundamentals of plant structure," Wilfrid Blunt observed in The Art of Botanical Illustration. Ehret was in great demand. Engravings after his botanical paintings illustrated Mark Catesby's works on the flora and fauna of the New World. Engravings from his series Plantae et Papiliones Rariores, 1748-59, found their way onto Chelsea porcelain For Philip Miller he illustrated many of the more spectacular plants that were in cultivation in the Chelsea Physic Garden. Ehret was at the top of his profession in 1768 when the young botanist Joseph Banks returned from Labrador and Newfoundland with the botanical specimens that made his early reputation; it was to Ehret he turned for meticulous paintings on vellum.

Ehret's original art work may be found at the Natural History Museum in London, the Royal Botanic Gardens, Kew, The Royal Society, London, the Lindley Library at the Royal Horticultural Society, the Victoria and Albert Museum, at the University Library of Erlangen, the LuEsther T. Mertz Library of the New York Botanical Garden, and the Hunt Institute for Botanical Documentation in Pittsburgh, Pennsylvania.

The genus Ehretia was named in his honour.

== Works ==
- Methodus plantarum sexualis (1736)
- Hortus nitidissimis (in 3 volumes, 1750-1786)
- The Natural History of Barbados,, Griffith Hughes, 1750.
- Plantae et papiliones rariores. This was published in parts from 1748 until 1759 in folio. The eighteen plates were engraved and hand-colored by Ehret himself. Most display a combination of one or more species of plants and of butterflies.
- Illustrations for Plantae selectae by Christoph Jakob Trew. Another copy of Plantae selectae at Missouri Botanical Gardens.
- Illustrations for "The Gardeners Dictionary" by Philip Miller, Seventh Edition, 1756-1759 (also reprinted in the Eighth, 1768), 16 plates
- Illustrations for Hortus Kewensis by William Aiton (in 3 volumes, 1789)
- Illustrations for Patrick Browne's spectacular The Civil and Natural History of Jamaica in three parts published in 1756.
