= Kliff =

Kliff may refer to:

== People ==
- Kliff Kingsbury (born 1979), American football coach and former player
- Sarah Kliff, American journalist

== Other uses ==
- Kliff (band), a Finnish boy band
- Kliff Undersn, a character in the Guilty Gear video game series
- Kuala Lumpur International Film Festival (KLIFF)
- Le Kliff, a restaurant south of Puerto Vallarta, Mexico

== See also ==
- Cliff (disambiguation)
- Rotes Kliff, a 52-metre high line of sea cliffs between Wenningstedt and Kampen on the German North Sea island of Sylt
- Morsum-Kliff, an important geological monument in Germany
