= Leslie Cliff =

Leslie Cliff may refer to:

- Leslie Cliff (swimmer) (born 1955), Canadian retired swimmer
- Leslie Cliff (figure skater) (1908–1969), British pair skater
