= Anne Clifford =

Anne Clifford may refer to:

- Lady Anne Clifford (1590–1676), English peeress and diarist
- Anne Clifford (theologian) (1944–2024), American Catholic theologian and college professor
