= George Clifford =

George Clifford may refer to:

- George Clifford (MP) (by 1524–69 or later), MP for Appleby (UK Parliament constituency)
- George Clifford, 3rd Earl of Cumberland (1558–1605), English peer and naval commander
- George Clifford (cricketer) (1852–1941), English cricketer
- George Clifford (footballer) (1896–1964), English footballer
- George Clifford III (1685–1760), Dutch banker and amateur botanist
- George Clifford Sziklai (1909–1998), Hungary-born American electronics engineer
- George Clifford Wilson (1902–1957), English cricketer
