= Cliff Lee (disambiguation) =

Cliff Lee (born 1978) is an American baseball starting pitcher

Cliff Lee may also refer to:

- Cliff Lee (outfielder) (1896–1980), American Major League Baseball outfielder
- Cliff Lee (potter) (born 1951), Taiwanese-American ceramic artist
