= John Cliff =

John Cliff may refer to:

- John Cliff (trade unionist) (1883–1977), British union and transport official
- John Cliff (actor) (1918–2001), American actor
- John MacFarlane Cliff (1921–1972), British physician

== See also ==
- John Clift (1877–1953), British sports shooter and archaeologist
