= Bennebroek =

- Village
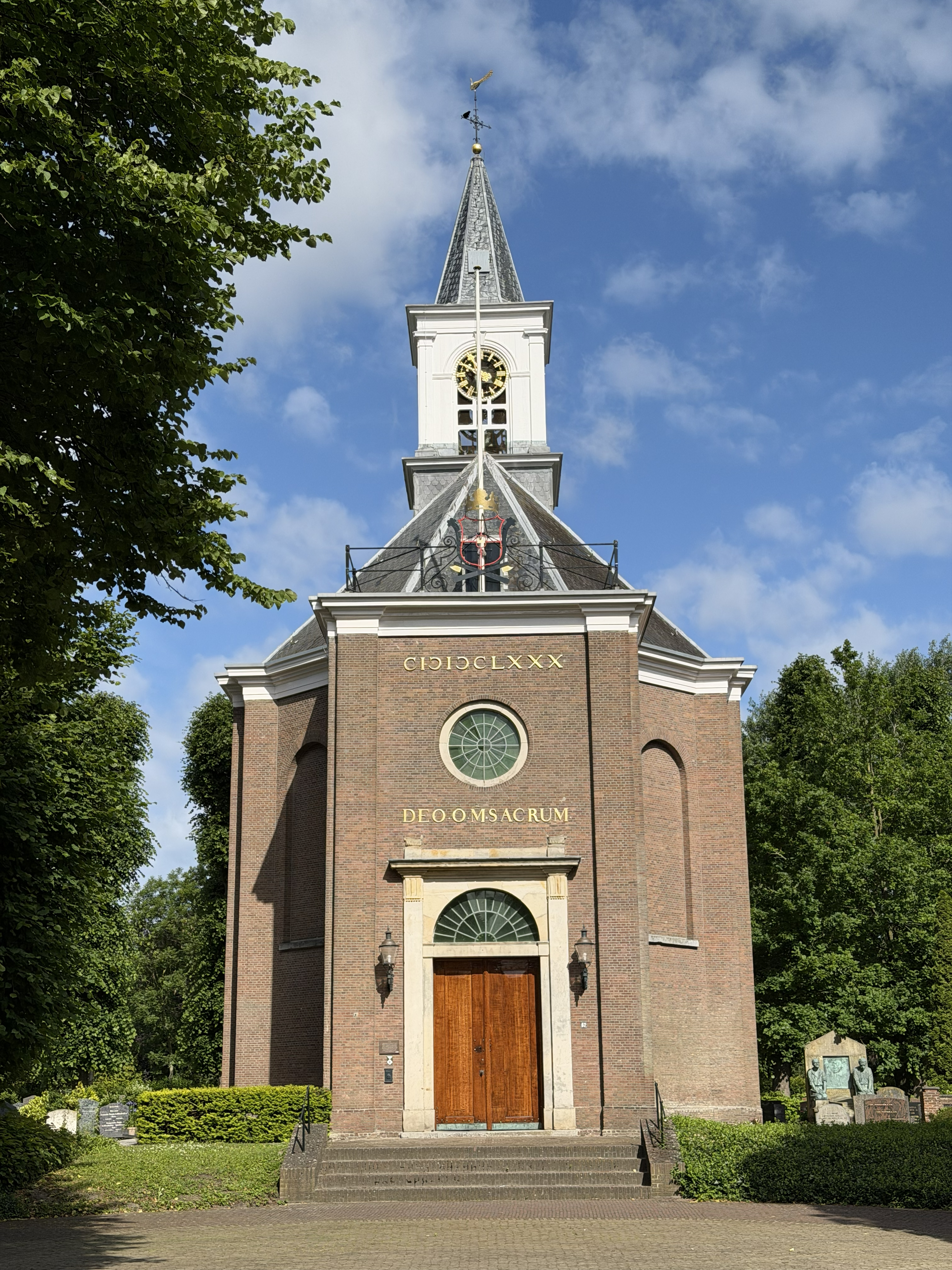
- Bennebroek Dutch Reformed church

- Flag Coat of arms

- Location in the Netherlands Location in the province of North Holland in the Netherlands
- Coordinates: 52.32°N 4.60°E
- Country: Netherlands
- Province: North Holland
- Municipality: Bloemendaal

Area
  - Total: 1.81 km^{2} (0.70 sq mi)
- Elevation: 1.4 m (4.6 ft)

Population (2021)
  - Total: 5,275
  - Density: 2,910/km^{2} (7,550/sq mi)
- Time zone: UTC+1 (CET)
  - Summer (DST): UTC+2 (CEST)
- Postal code: 2121
- Dialing code: 023

Bennebroek (Dutch pronunciation: [ˈbɛnəbruk]) is a village and former municipality in the northwest Netherlands, now part of Bloemendaal, North Holland. Before its merger in 2009, it was the smallest municipality in the Netherlands, covering an area of only 1.75 km².

== History ==
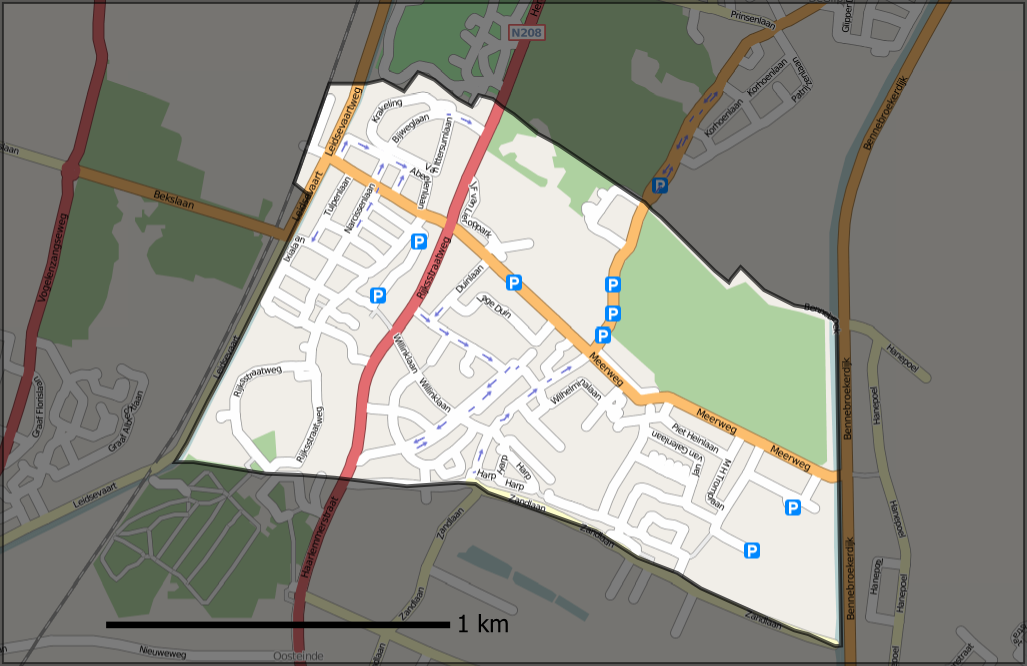
The former municipality of Bennebroek

Bennebroek was probably formed in the 13th century and its development was closely linked to the peat harvesting industry.

On 28 May 1653, Bennebroek split off from the Heemstede fiefdom and Adriaen Pauw, son of Adriaan Pauw, became its first feudal lord. Its population was dependent on animal husbandry and transportation. Later bulb flower cultivation became an important business. Since the second half of the 20th century, Bennebroek has primarily been a commuter community for the surrounding cities.

On 29 March 2007, the municipal councils of Bennebroek and Bloemendaal agreed to merge into one municipality, which took place on 1 January 2009.

=== Local government ===
The last municipal council of Bennebroek before its merger consisted of 11 seats, which at the 2006 elections were divided as follows:

- VVD: 4 seats
- CDA: 4 seats
- PvdA: 3 seats

== Attractions ==
- Linnaeushof, a park known as Europe's largest children's playground, formerly a botanical garden where Carl Linnaeus acted as hortulanus (lead gardener) in the 18th century and where he wrote the Hortus Cliffortianus
- Hartekamp, an estate (partially in Heemstede) with an extensive public park
- Former Vogelenzang-Bennebroek railway station, open from 1842 to 1944

== Gallery ==
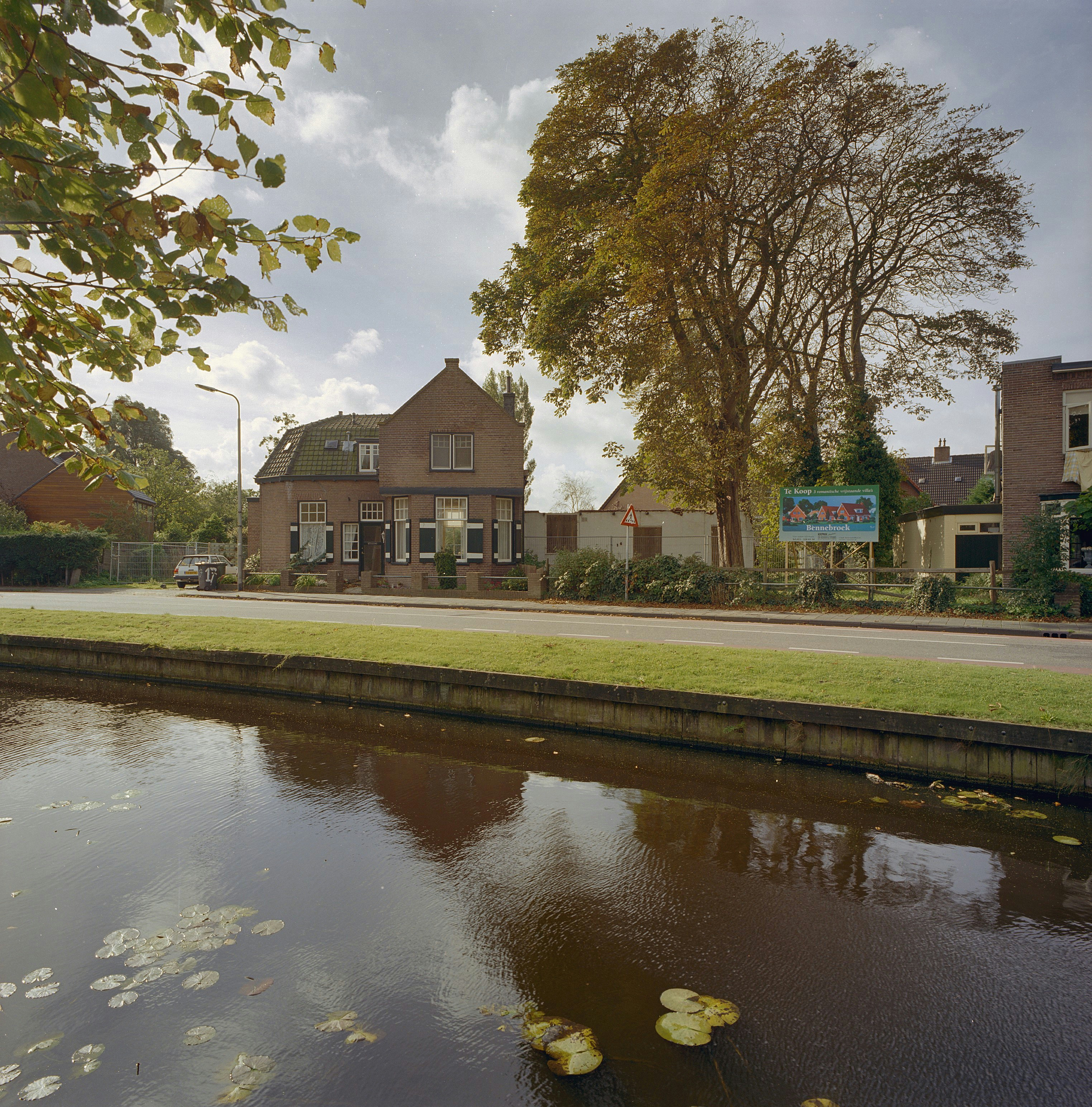
Houses in Bennebroek

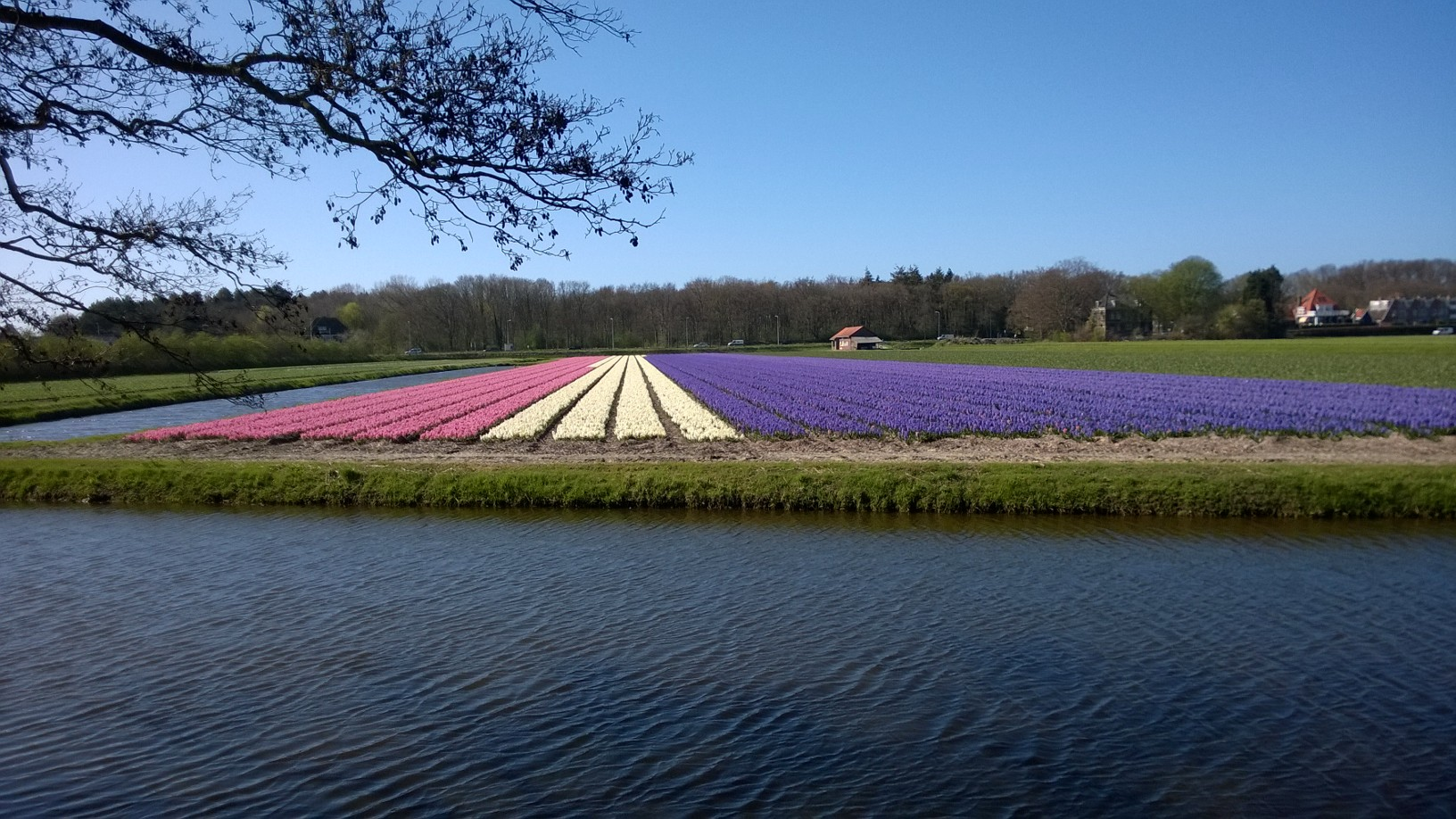
Fields of Hyacinths

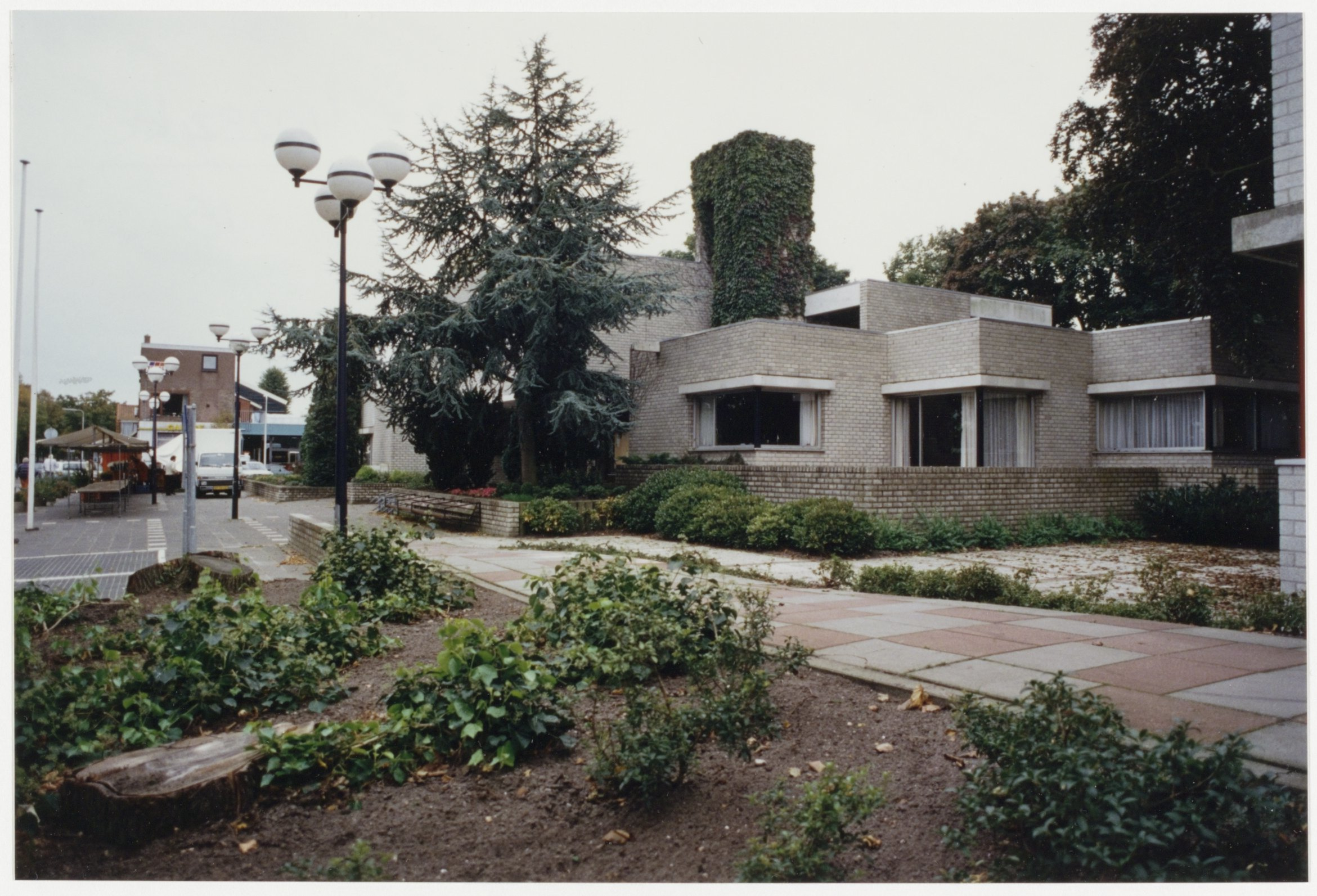
Former town hall

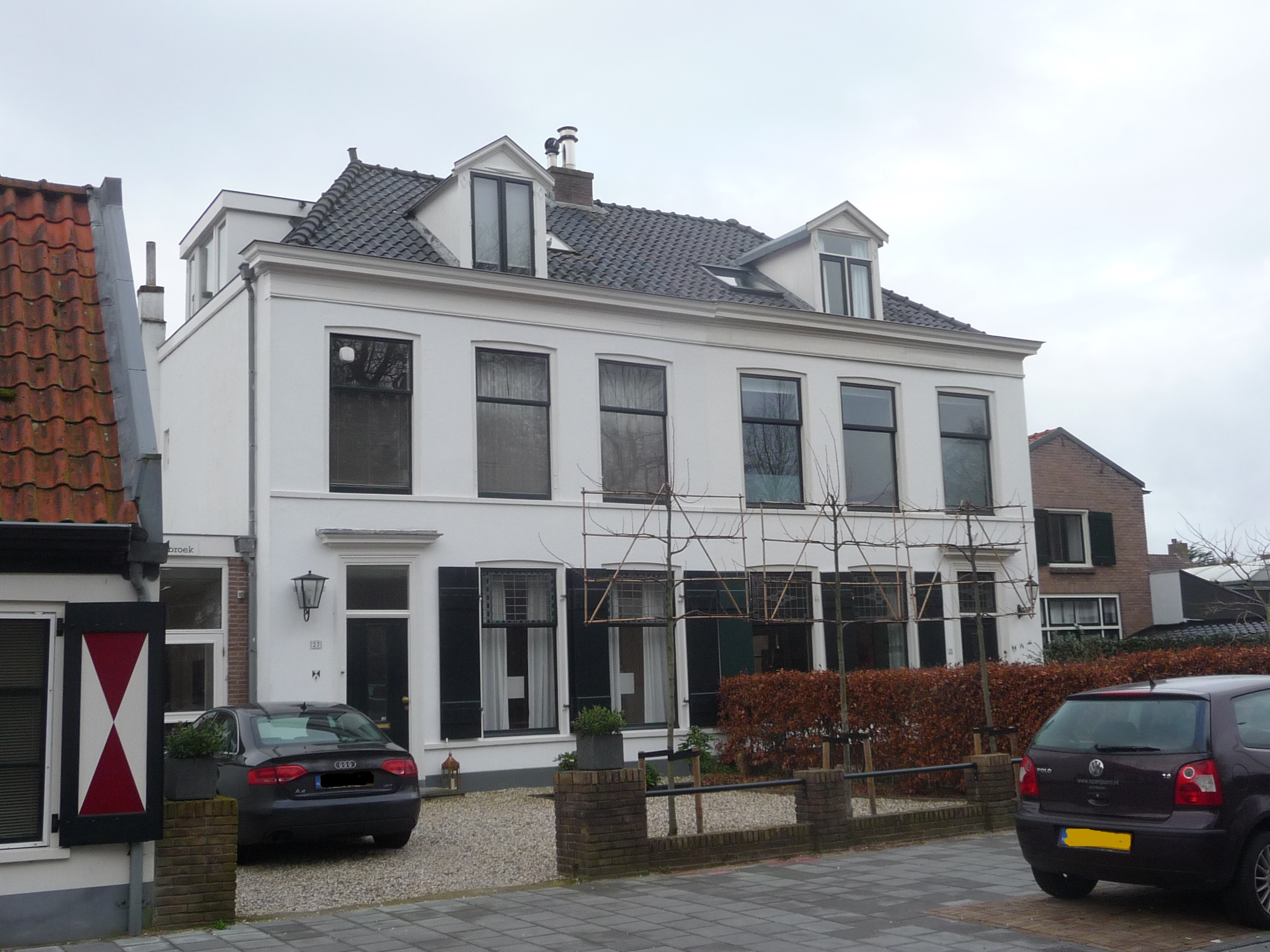
House in Bennebroek

== See also ==
- George Clifford III
