= Sarabande and Danse =

Sarabande and Danse may refer to:

- Sarabande and Danse (Clifford), a ballet by John Clifford
- Sarabande and Danse (d'Amboise), a ballet by Jacques d'Amboise
