= Daniel Clifford =

Daniel Clifford or Dan Clifford may refer to:

- Dan Clifford (Holby City), a fictional character in the TV series Holby City
- Dan Clifford (rugby league), Australian rugby league player, in Queensland Rugby League Northern Division's 2008 "Team of the Century"
- Dan Clifford (theatre entrepreneur) (died 1942), Australian cinema chain owner
- Daniel Clifford (chef) (born 1973), English chef
- dbClifford, (born 1979), French singer
