= William Clifford =

William Clifford may refer to:

- William Clifford (priest) (died 1670), English Roman Catholic theologian
- William Clifford (cricketer) (1811–1841), English cricketer
- William H. Clifford (1862–1929), Ohio politician
- W. H. Clifford (William H. Clifford), writer, director, and film company head
- William Clifford (actor) (1877–1941), American actor of the silent era
- William Clifford (bishop) (1823–1893), English prelate of the Roman Catholic Church
- William Kingdon Clifford (1845–1879), mathematician and philosopher
- William Clifford Heilman (1877–1946), American composer
- Billy Clifford (soccer), American professional soccer player
- Billy Clifford (footballer) (born 1992), English professional footballer
- Bill Clifford (runner) (born 1925), American middle-distance runner, 1947 NCAA 800 m winner for the Ohio State Buckeyes track and field team
- Bill Clifford (sprinter) (born 1916), sprinter, 1938 100 m All-American for the Notre Dame Fighting Irish track and field team
