= CLIF =

CLIF may refer to:

- Common Logic Interchange Format, a dialect of the Common Logic Standard
- Courage, Loyalty, Integrity, Fairness (abbreviated C.L.I.F.), a police procedural series produced in Singapore
  - It may also refer to one of the other five seasons: C.L.I.F. 2, C.L.I.F. 3, C.L.I.F. 4, or C.L.I.F. 5
- Clif Bar, an American company that produces organic foods and drinks

== See also ==
- Cliff (disambiguation)
