= Sarabande and Danse (Clifford) =

Ballet

Sarabande and Danse is a ballet choreographed by John Clifford to Debussy's Sarabande (1901) and Danse (1890). The premiere took place on 21 May 1970, with New York City Ballet at the New York State Theater, Lincoln Center.

== Original cast ==
- Johnna Kirkland
- Earle Sieveling
- Violette Verdy
- John Clifford
