= Violet Cliff =

British figure skater

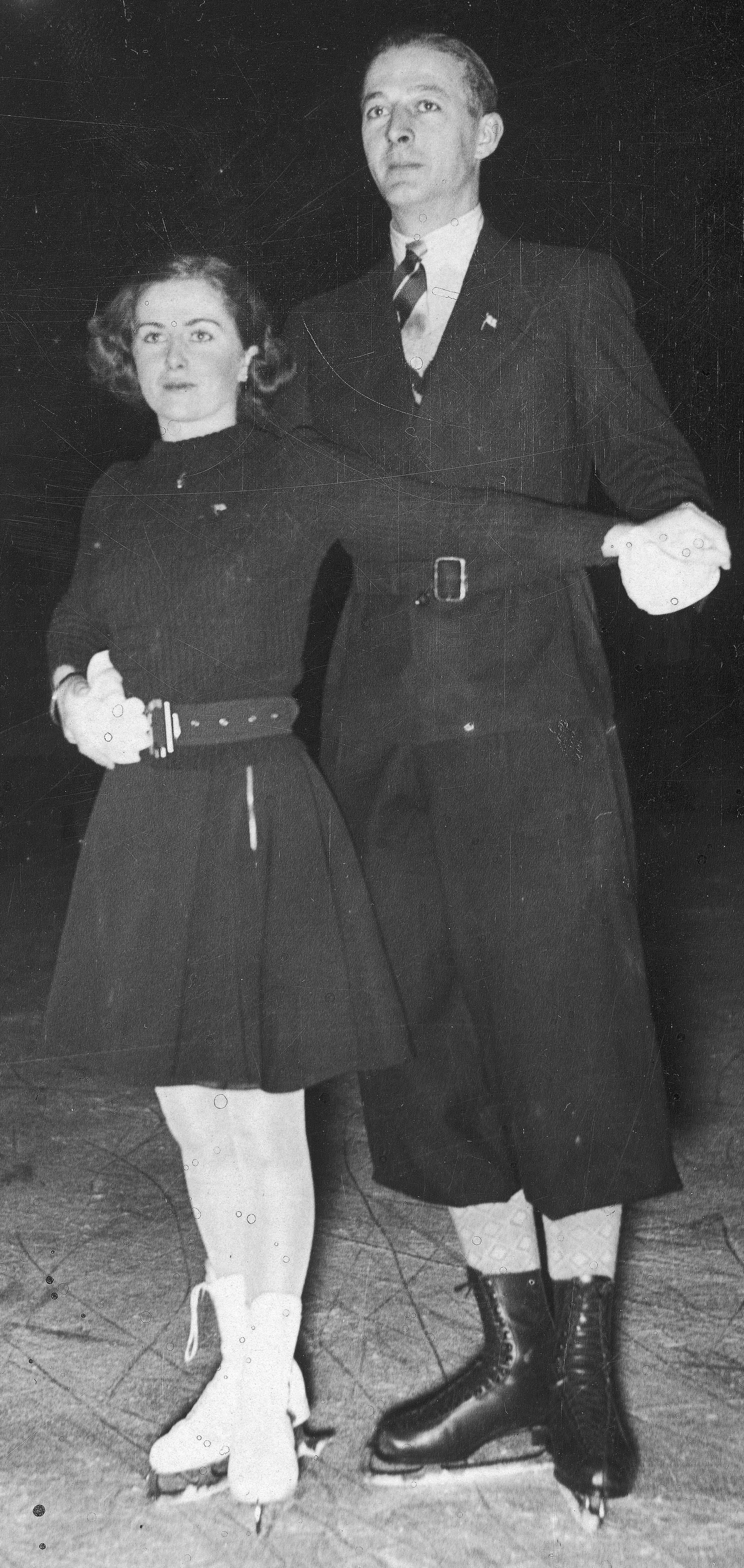
- Cliff with her partner Leslie Cliff at the 1936 European Championships

Personal information
- Other names: Violet Hamilton Supple
- Born: 2 November 1916 Bath
- Died: 23 March 2003 (aged 86) Andover, Hampshire, England

Figure skating career
- Country: United Kingdom
- Skating club: Bournemouth
Medal record
Representing United Kingdom
Pairs Figure skating
World Championships
| Bronze medal – third place | 1937 Vienna | Pairs |
| Bronze medal – third place | 1936 Paris | Pairs |
European Championships
| Silver medal – second place | 1936 Berlin | Pairs |

Violet Hamilton Cliff (née Supple) (2 November 1916 – 23 March 2003) was a British pair skater who competed with her husband, Leslie Cliff. The couple finished seventh at the 1936 Winter Olympics. That same year, they won the silver medal at the European Figure Skating Championships and the bronze at the World Figure Skating Championships. They won another bronze at the 1937 World Championships. She was born in Bath, Somerset, England.

== Results ==
(with Cliff)

| Event | 1933 | 1934 | 1935 | 1936 | 1937 | 1938 | 1939 |
|---|---|---|---|---|---|---|---|
| Winter Olympic Games | | | | 7th | | | |
| World Championships | | | | 3rd | 3rd | 4th | 5th |
| European Championships | 4th | | 7th | 2nd | 4th | | |
