= John Clifford =

John Clifford may refer to:

- John Clifford, 7th Baron Clifford (1389–1422), also 7th Lord of Skipton
- John Clifford, 9th Baron Clifford (1435–1461), also 9th Lord of Skipton, Lancastrian military leader during the Wars of the Roses
- John H. Clifford (1809–1876), Governor of Massachusetts
- John Clifford (minister) (1836–1923), British nonconformist minister and politician
- J. R. Clifford or John Robert Clifford (1848–1933), West Virginian African-American attorney
- John David Clifford Jr. (1887–1956), United States District Judge for the District of Maine
- John R. Clifford (fl. from 1985), American veterinarian
- John Clifford (choreographer) (fl. from 1976)
- Johnny Clifford (1934–2007), Irish hurler
