= Los Angeles Dance Theater =

American dance and theatre company

The Los Angeles Dance Theater is an erotic dance-oriented production founded in 2003 by George Balanchine protege John Clifford. The company was requested by Warner Bros. Theatre Ventures, Inc., the live theatre division of Warner Bros. Studios. The company was founded for the purpose of creating a live-stage dance version of the film Casablanca. "Casablanca, The Dance" premiered in Beijing, China on the 5th of April, 2005 at the 10,000 seat "Great Hall of the People" to sold-out audiences and standing ovations. A projected world tour was cancelled when Warner Bros. ceased live theatre operations after the failure of their first Broadway musical, "Lestat". Later, Warner Bros. restarted producing musicals, fueling rumors about the revival of the "Casablanca, The Dance," world tour.
