= Clifton (given name) =

- Gender: Male

Origin
- Language: Old English
- Meaning: Town by a cliff

Other names
- Derivative: Cliff
- Related names: Clifford

Clifton is a given name. Notable people with the name include:

- Clifton Abraham (born 1971), American and Canadian football player
- Clifton Bailey (born 1967), Jamaican reggae musician, better known as Capleton
- Clifton Bloomfield (born 1969), American serial killer
- Clifton R. Breckinridge (1846–1932), American politician
- Clifton Campbell (born 1967), American sprinter
- Clifton Bush (born 1970), American professional basketball player
- Clifton B. Cates (1893–1970), United States Marine Corps four-star general
- Clifton Chenier (1925–1987), American zydeco musician
- Clifton Collins Jr. (born 1970), American actor
- Clifton Daniel (1912–2000), American newspaperman
- Clifton Daniel (bishop) (born 1947), American bishop
- Clifton Truman Daniel (born 1957), American writer, public relations executive, and grandson of Harry S. Truman
- Clifton Davis (born 1945), American actor
- Clifton DeBerry (1923–2006), American politician
- Clifton De Coteau (died 2021), Trinidad politician
- Clifton O. Dummett (1919–2011), American dentist, dean, and historian
- Clifton Fadiman (1904–1999), American radio and television personality
- Clifton C. Garvin (1921–2016), American engineer, army officer, and oilman
- Clifton Grima, Maltese politician
- Clifton A. Hall (1826–1913), a Rhode Island architect
- Clifton James (1921–2017), American actor
- Clifton Johnson (1865–1940), American author, illustrator, and photographer
- Clifton H. Johnson (1921–2008), American historian
- Clifton Jones (born 1937), Jamaican actor
- Clifton J. Joy (1922–1994), Newfoundland physician and politician
- Clifton Leaf, American journalist, editor of Fortune magazine
- Clifton H. Levy (1867–1962), American rabbi
- Clifton Maloney (1937–2009), American businessman
- Clifton N. McArthur (1879–1923), American politician
- Clifton McNeely (1919–2003), American basketball player and coach
- Clifton Newman (born 1951), American attorney and judge
- Clifton Parker (1905–1989), English composer
- Clifton Powell (born 1956), American actor
- Clifton Blackburn Prewitt (1826–1902) African American real estate developer
- Clifton Ray (born 1958), American serial killer
- Clifton Sandvliet (born 1977), Surinamese retired footballer
- Clifton Smith (born 1985), American football player
- Clifton Smith (born 1980), American football player
- Clifton Sprague (1896–1955), World War II–era officer in the U.S. Navy
- Clifton Sunada (born 1971), American judoka
- C. Clifton Virts (1910–1985), American politician and lawyer from Maryland
- Clifton Webb (1889–1966), American actor
- Clifton Reginald Wharton Sr. (1899–1990), American diplomat
- Clifton Wheeler (1883–1953), American artist
- Clifton Williams (1932–1967), NASA astronaut and USMC Major
- Clifton A. Woodrum (1887–1950), American pharmacist and politician
- Clifton Young (1917–1951), American actor
