= Carrie Williams Clifford =

American feminist author, clubwoman and civil rights activist

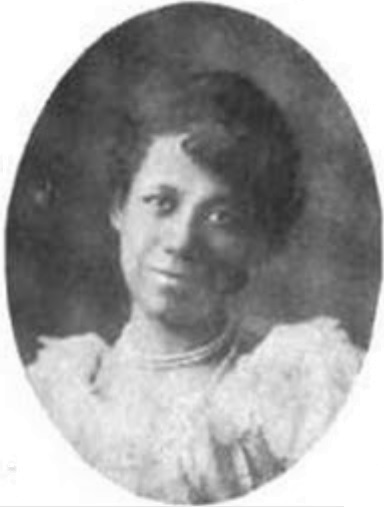
- Clifford, February 1901
- Born: September 1862; Chillicothe, Ohio
- Died: November 10, 1934 (aged 72)
- Burial place: Woodland Cemetery
- Known for: Poetry, civil rights activism, women's rights activism
- Spouse: William H. Clifford (married 1886-1934)
- Children: Joshua; Maurice

Carrie Williams Clifford (September 1862 in Chillicothe, Ohio – November 10, 1934) was an author, clubwoman, and activist in the women's rights and civil rights movements in the United States.

== Personal life ==
Born in Chillicothe, Ohio and raised and educated in the state, Clifford left the state to teach in Parkersburg, West Virginia, for three years. In 1886, she returned to Cleveland, Ohio, married Ohio state legislator William H. Clifford, and became an engaged clubwoman. In 1908, she moved with her husband and two children, Maurice and Joshua, to Washington, D.C. Clifford died on November 10, 1934, and was buried at Woodland Cemetery in Cleveland, Ohio.

=== Political work ===
While living in Cleveland, Clifford founded the Minerva Reading Club, which discussed current social problems. Her work as the assistant recording secretary for the National Association of Colored Women led her to found the Ohio Federation of Colored Women's Clubs in 1901. She served as the organization's first president while she lived in Cleveland.

Clifford developed a close relationship with W. E. B. DuBois, beginning when she hosted a talk by him in Cleveland. At his request, Clifford helped organize a women's auxiliary within the Niagara Movement and succeeded in recruiting a large number of female delegates for the 1907 Niagara Movement meeting in Boston. Once she moved to Washington, D.C., she hosted regular Sunday evening gatherings, frequented by DuBois and other black activists involved in the Harlem Renaissance like Mary Church Terrell.

When the NAACP grew out of the Niagara Movement, Clifford transitioned into the new organization, serving on the central leadership committee and as a leader of the group's work on children's issues. She worked with other prominent black activist women, including Mary Church Terrell and Addie D. Waites Hunton, on this issue and others, including lynching. Clifford's anti-lynching work involved helping organize a Silent Parade in Washington, D.C., in 1922 and meeting with President William Taft to show the NAACP's support for anti-lynching reforms.

Beyond her work for the NAACP, Clifford was also a frequent lecturer, speaking on issues related to politics and race.

== Writing ==
Clifford wrote two books of poetry, Race Rhymes (1911) and The Widening Light (1922), the first of which she dedicated to her mother and the second of which she dedicated to her race. She wrote in the preface of Race Rhymes that the common theme of the poems is "the uplift of humanity" and that she hoped her poems would "change some evil heart, right some wrong and raise some arm strong to deliver." The poems in these books grapple with issues of racial and gender inequality, discuss current events in black political life, and celebrate black historical figures. Issues like lynching appear both in her poetry and political advocacy work. She also wrote in favor of temperance.

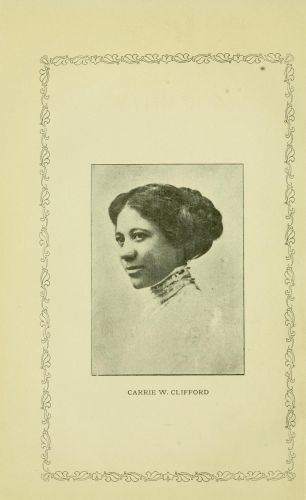
Clifford, in Race Rhymes (1911)

Clifford's political work and poetry intersected in her involvement in black newspapers. Her poems, with their political messages, were occasionally published in these papers, and she published essays there as well. In her essay "Votes for Children," published in the NAACP paper The Crisis, Clifford argued in favor of women's enfranchisement as a way of protecting children and the family. Clifford also contributed to the women's section of the Cleveland Journal as its editor. Beyond being the organization's president, Clifford further contributed to the Ohio Federation of Colored Women's Clubs by editing their recurring publication and an essay collection.

== Works ==
=== Books ===
- Race Rhymes, Printed by R. L. Pendleton, Washington, D.C.: 1911.
- The Widening Light, Walter Reid Co., Boston, MA: 1922.
- (edited) Sowing for Others to Reap, Charles Alexander, Boston, MA, 1900.

=== Poems ===
- "Brothers." Opportunity. 1925
- "Lines to Garrison." Alexander's Magazine 1 (1906–1907): 8–9.
- "Love’s Way (A Christmas Story)." Alexander's Magazine 1 (1906–1907): 55–58.

=== Essays ===
- "Cleveland and its Colored People" (1905)
- "Votes for Children" (August 1915), The Crisis 10: 185

== See also ==
- Civil rights movement (1896–1954)
- History of women in the United States

== Bibliography ==
- Wilson, Rosemary Clifford, Introduction to Clifford, Carrie W., The Widening Light. Walter Reid Co., Boston, 1922.
- Kerlin, Robert, Negro Poets and Their Poems. Associate Publishers, Washington, D.C., 1923.
- Carter, Linda M., Notable Black American Women, Book II. Gale Research Inc., Detroit, 1996.
- Roses, Lorraine Eleana and Randolph, Ruth Elizabeth (eds.), Harlem’s Glory: Black Women Writing, 1900–1950. Harvard University Press, Cambridge MA, 1996.
- Roses, Lorraine, Black Women in America.
