= Thomas Clifford =

Thomas Clifford may refer to:

- Thomas Clifford, 1st Baron Clifford of Chudleigh (1630–1673), English statesman and politician
- Thomas Clifford, 6th Baron Clifford (1363–1391)
- Thomas Clifford, 8th Baron Clifford (1414–1455)
- Sir Thomas Clifford-Constable, 1st Baronet (1762–1823)
- Thomas Clifford-Constable (1807–1870), British landowner and Member of Parliament, son of the 1st Baronet
- Thomas Clifford, 14th Baron Clifford of Chudleigh (born 1948), British baron
- Thomas Clifford (footballer) (1875–1917), Scottish footballer
- Tom Clifford (politician), municipal politician in Toronto, Ontario, Canada
- Tom Clifford (rugby union) (1923–1990), Irish rugby union player
- Tom Clifford (footballer), English footballer

== See also ==
- Clifford (name)
