= Clifford J. Laube =

American poet

Clifford J. Laube (August 28, 1891 – August 21, 1974) was an American poet, magazine and newspaper editor and publisher.

== Biography ==
Born to a prospecting couple in Telluride, Colorado, Laube spent most of his early years in poverty in Rico, Colorado. Upon the death of his mother, Laube was placed in an orphanage where he developed his strong attachment to the Catholic faith. He managed to attain a high school education and became a newspaper man in Rico, Colorado. During a trip east, a chance encounter in Manhattan led Laube to a job at the New York Daily News. He eventually moved on to The New York Times and became their suburban editor.

In 1937, Laube founded Monastine Press, a small house dedicated to publishing the works of Catholic poets. Books published by Monastine included The Lantern Burns by Jessica Powers, Rind and All by Joseph Tusiani, The Last Garland by Theodore Maynard, and Crags by Laube himself.

Laube's writing was published in a variety of secular and religious media, including The New York Times, Commonweal Magazine, Signs, and Queen of All Hearts Magazine. He was also co-founder of the Catholic Poetry Society of America. By the time of his death in 1974, Laube had become a celebrated figure in American Catholic arts and letters, having received four honorary doctorates from Fordham University, Boston College, St. Bonaventure College, and Manhattan College.

== Death ==
Laube died in Callicoon, New York, on August 21, 1974, a week before his 83rd birthday.

== Sources ==
- Clifford J. Laube, Broken Crusts: Songs of Faith and Freedom, 2007, Arx Publishing, ISBN 978-1-889758-73-2.
