= Kliff (band) =

Finnish boy band

KLIFF
- Origin: Finland
- Genres: Pop, Hip Hop
- Years active: 2012–2016
- Labels: Warner Music
- Members: Elie; Tomi; Topias; Ville

KLIFF was a Finnish boy band establish in 2012 consisting of 4 young singers, Ville, Topias, Tomi and Elie. The band is signed with Warner Music Finland who signed them after seeing some of their performances online. The band's debut single "Mun Jopo" released on 24 February 2014 has charted on the Finnish Singles Chart.

== Members ==
The four members of Kliff are:

- Elie (born 1 July 1995)
- Tomi (born 4 April 1995)
- Topias (born 29 December 1996)
- Ville (born 21 November 1995)

== Discography ==
=== Singles ===
Year	Single	Peak positions
Year	Single	FIN
2014	"Mun jopo"	16
2014	"Maija"	N/A
2014	"Maija Remix"	N/A
2014	"Aseeton"	N/A
