= Robert Clifford =

Robert Clifford or Bob Clifford may refer to:

== English nobility ==
- Robert Clifford, 1st Baron Clifford (1274–1314), English soldier and the first Lord Warden of the Marches
- Robert Clifford, 3rd Baron Clifford (1305–1344), second son of Robert de Clifford, 1st Baron Clifford
- Robert Clifford, 4th Baron Clifford (c.1330–1350), eldest son of Robert Clifford, 3rd Baron Clifford

== Law ==
- Robert A. Clifford, American trial attorney
- Robert L. Clifford (1924–2014), Associate Justice of the New Jersey Supreme Court
- Robert W. Clifford (born 1937), American lawyer and Associate Justice of the Maine Supreme Judicial Court

== Sport ==
- Bob Clifford (footballer) (born 1937), Australian rules footballer
- Bob Clifford (American football) (1913–2006), American football player and coach
- Robert Clifford (cricketer) (1752–1811), English cricketer
- Robert Clifford (footballer) (1883–?), Scottish footballer

== Others ==
- Robert Clifford (MP) (died 1423), MP for Kent in 1401
- Robert T. Clifford (1835–1878), American soldier and Medal of Honor recipient
- Bob Clifford, Australian shipbuilder, entrepreneur, and businessman

== See also ==
- Clifford Roberts (1894–1977), American investment dealer and golf administrator
