= Community-Led Infrastructure Finance Facility =

UK and Swedish finance facility

The Community-Led Infrastructure Finance Facility or CLIFF was a UK and Swedish finance facility created in 2002 providing bridge finance and venture capital for housing and infrastructure (especially water and sanitation) to developing countries. It was coordinated by the charity Homeless International, with most of the funding coming from the United Kingdom's Department for International Development and the Swedish International Development Cooperation Agency. The facility was shut down in 2018.

CLIFF was mainly intended to support community-led NGOs and CBOs working on issues of social housing and urban poverty, who do not have otherwise access to mainstream housing finance (especially in countries where the financial sector is still under-developed). It allows communities to implement demonstration projects, in order to secure funding for larger-scale projects.

== History ==
CLIFF was created as the result of a Department for International Development-funded research entitled Bridging the Finance Gap, started in 1999, and first piloted in 2002 in India. A first phase ran between 2002 and 2010, with almost £10 million funded by DFID and SIDA; a second phase was run until 2015, with around £20 million committed by the same funders. CLIFF started in India in 2002, in Kenya in 2005, in the Philippines in 2007, in Nepal in 2010, and in West Africa, Malawi, Angola and Zimbabwe in 2011.
