= Clifford A. Ukkelberg =

American farmer and politician

Clifford A. Ukkelberg (March 17, 1904 – March 30, 1996) was an American farmer and politician.

Ukkelberg was born on a farm in Clitherall, Otter Tail County, Minnesota, and went to the Clitherall Public Schools. He graduated from the University of Minnesota School of Agriculture in 1927. Ukkelberg lived with his wife and family in Clitherall, Minnesota, and was a farmer. Ukkelberg served on the Clitherall School Board. He served in the Minnesota House of Representatives from 1955 to 1958 and in the Minnesota Senate from 1959 to 1972.
