= Charles Clifford =

Charles Clifford may refer to:

- Sir Charles Clifford, 1st Baronet (1813–1893), first speaker of the New Zealand House of Representatives
- Charles Clifford (photographer) (1820–1863), Welsh photographer
- Sir Charles Clifford, 4th Baronet (1821–1895), member of parliament (MP) for the Isle of Wight 1857–1865, Newport 1870–1885
- Charles Clifford, pseudonym of William Henry Ireland (1775–1835), English literary forger
- Charles Clifford (locomotive engineer) (died 1927), locomotive superintendent of the Great Northern Railway of Ireland
- Charles Clifford, 8th Baron Clifford of Chudleigh (1819–1880), British peer
- Charles William Digby Clifford (1842–1916), Irish-born miner, trader, hotel owner and political figure in British Columbia
