= Patrick Clifford =

Patrick Clifford may refer to:

- Patrick Clifford (politician) (1854–?), member of the Wisconsin State Assembly
- Pat Clifford (footballer, born 1903) (1903-1948), Welsh footballer, see List of AFC Bournemouth players
- Patrick Clifford (darts player), Irish darts player
- Patrick Clifford (musician) (born 1966), musician, songwriter, and producer of Irish and folk music
