= Clifford Lyne =

South African swimmer (born 1970)

Personal information
- Born: 24 April 1970 (age 56)

Sport
- Sport: Swimming

Clifford Lyne (born 24 April 1970) is a South African swimmer. He competed in three events at the 1992 Summer Olympics.
