= Cliffy =

Cliffy or Cliffie may refer to:

== People ==
- Cliffy Drysdale, former professional tennis player
- Cliffie Grinde, former member of the Norwegian folk rock band Vamp
- Cliffie Hodgson, player coach of Broadstreet Rugby Club and point-scoring record holder at Coventry R.F.C.
- Cliffy Huntington, stage name of Cliff Powell, member of the punk band The Huntingtons
- Cliffy, a nickname of Cliff Lyons (born 1961), indigenous Australian former rugby league footballer
- Cliffy Rylie, 2017 winner of the South East Asian Mathematics Competition
- Cliffie Stone, stage name of Clifford Gilpin Snyder (1917–1998), American country singer, musician, record producer, music publisher and radio and TV personality
- Cliffy the Clown (fl. 1950s), American clown
- "Cliffie", a student at Radcliffe College, Cambridge, Massachusetts

== Other uses ==
- Cliffy (film), a 2013 telemovie about Cliff Young's 1983 ultramarathon run
- "Cliffy", an episode of the TV series The Rookies
- Cliffy Island, Victoria, Australia

== See also ==
- Cliff
