= Alfred Cliff =

English cricketer

Personal information
- Full name: Alfred Talbot Cliff
- Born: 27 October 1878; Brigg, Lincolnshire, England
- Died: 25 January 1966 (aged 87); Oxford, Oxfordshire, England
- Batting: Right-handed
- Bowling: Slow left-arm orthodox

Domestic team information
- Years: Team
- 1912–1920: Worcestershire

Career statistics
Competition	First-class
Matches	39
Runs scored	986
Batting average	13.69
100s/50s	–/4
Top score	81*
Balls bowled	649
Wickets	8
Bowling average	53.25
5 wickets in innings	–
10 wickets in match	–
Best bowling	1/4
Catches/stumpings	12/–
- Source: Cricinfo, 2 July 2022

Alfred Talbot Cliff (27 October 1878 – 25 January 1966) was an English first-class cricketer. Holding amateur status, Cliff was a right-handed batsman and slow left arm bowler who played 39 times for Worcestershire between 1912 and 1920. He scored 986 runs at 13.69 and took eight wickets, though never more than one in a single innings: his first scalp, when playing against Kent, was England Test batsman Frank Woolley.

Cliff was born in Scawby Grove, Brigg, Lincolnshire; he died in Oxford at the age of 87.
