= Paul Clifford (cricketer) =

English cricketer

Paul Clifford (born 19 September 1976) was an English cricketer. He was a right-handed batsman and right-arm medium-pace bowler who played for Wiltshire. He was born in Swindon.

Clifford made his cricketing debut during the 1993 Second XI Championship for Somerset, before joining Wiltshire in the Minor Counties Championship the following season. Despite taking the following two seasons out of the game, he returned to the team in 1997.

Clifford made his only List A appearance for the team during the 1999 NatWest Trophy competition. From the lower order, he scored 15 runs with the bat, and took figures of 3–46 with the ball from ten overs.

Most recently, in 2008, Clifford played for Chippenham in the Cockspur Cup.
