= Clifford Longley =

English journalist and author

- Education: Trinity School of John Whitgift
- Alma mater: University of Southampton
- Occupation: Journalist

Clifford Longley is an English journalist and author.

== Early life ==
Clifford Longley was educated at the Trinity School of John Whitgift in Croydon. He graduated from the University of Southampton.

== Career ==
Longley was a journalist for The Times from 1967 to 1992. He was a columnist for The Daily Telegraph from 1992 to 2000. He is a columnist and contributing editor for The Tablet, a Roman Catholic magazine.

Longley is the author of several books. He has advised the Catholic Bishops' Conference of England and Wales.

== Works ==
- Longley, Clifford (2000). The Worlock Archive. London: G. Chapman. ISBN 9780225668575. OCLC 42619564.
- Longley, Clifford (2002). Chosen People: The Big Idea That Shaped England and America. London: Hodder & Stoughton. ISBN 9780340786567. OCLC 49739142.
- Longley, Clifford (2014). Just Money: How Catholic Social Teaching Can Redeem Capitalism. London: Theos. ISBN 9780957474352. OCLC 902649048.
- Longley, Clifford (2014). The Babylon Contingency. Oxford: Lion Fiction. ISBN 9781782641209. OCLC 894640238.
