= Clifford Alan King =

American electrical engineer

Clifford Alan King is an electrical engineer with L-3 Communications of Gloucester, Massachusetts. King was named a Fellow of the Institute of Electrical and Electronics Engineers (IEEE) in 2012 for his contributions to silicon germanium heterojunction devices and technologies.
