= Hartekamp =

Dutch botanical garden

Coordinates: 52°19′43″N 4°35′50″E

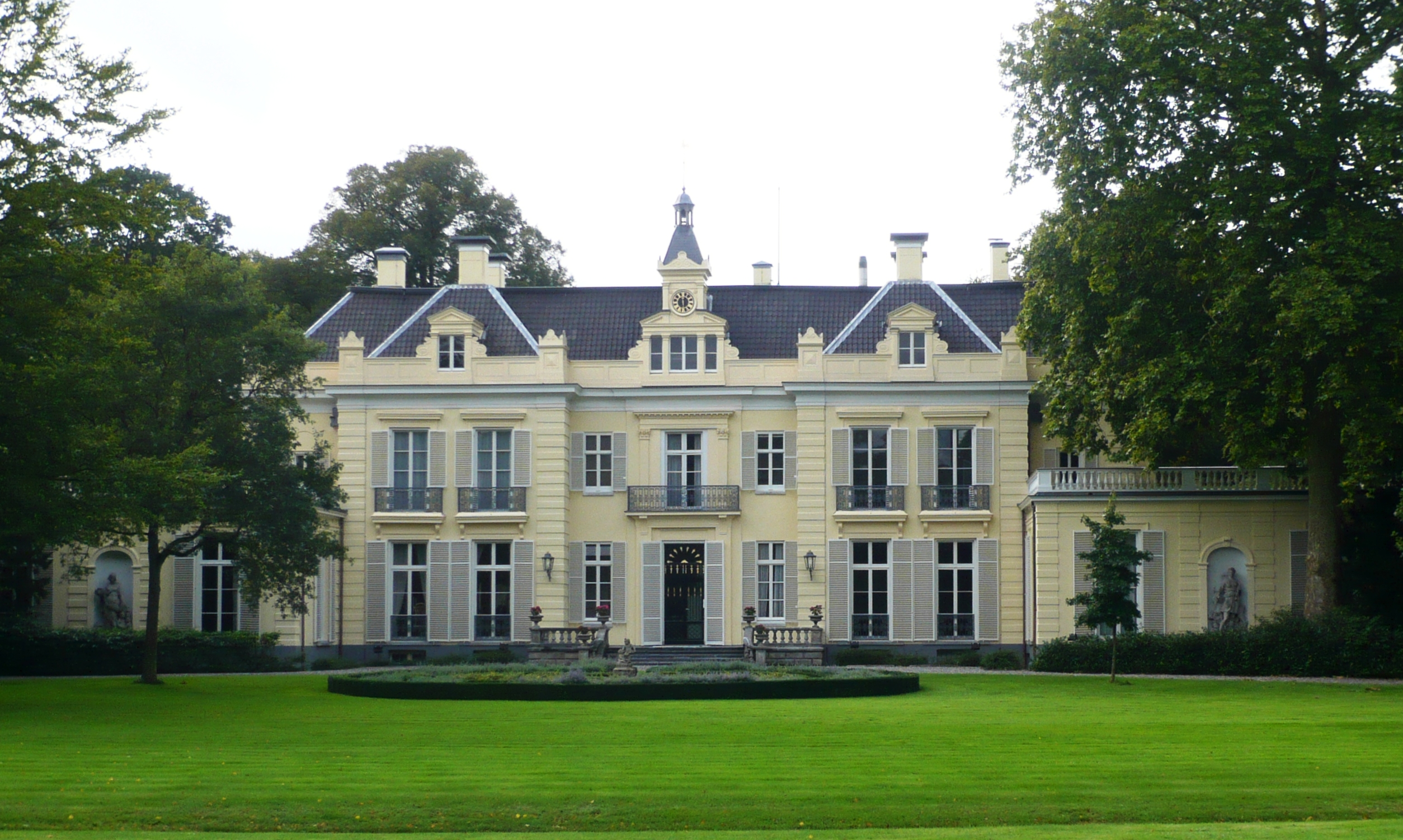
View of Hartekamp from the Herenweg, road from Haarlem to Leiden leading along 17th and 18th century buitenplaatsen

Hartekamp, or Hartecamp, is the name of a villa in Heemstede, North Holland, the Netherlands, on the Bennebroek border. It was once the buitenplaats of George Clifford, who employed Carl Linnaeus in 1737 to write his Hortus Cliffortianus, a detailed description of the gardens of Hartecamp.

== History ==
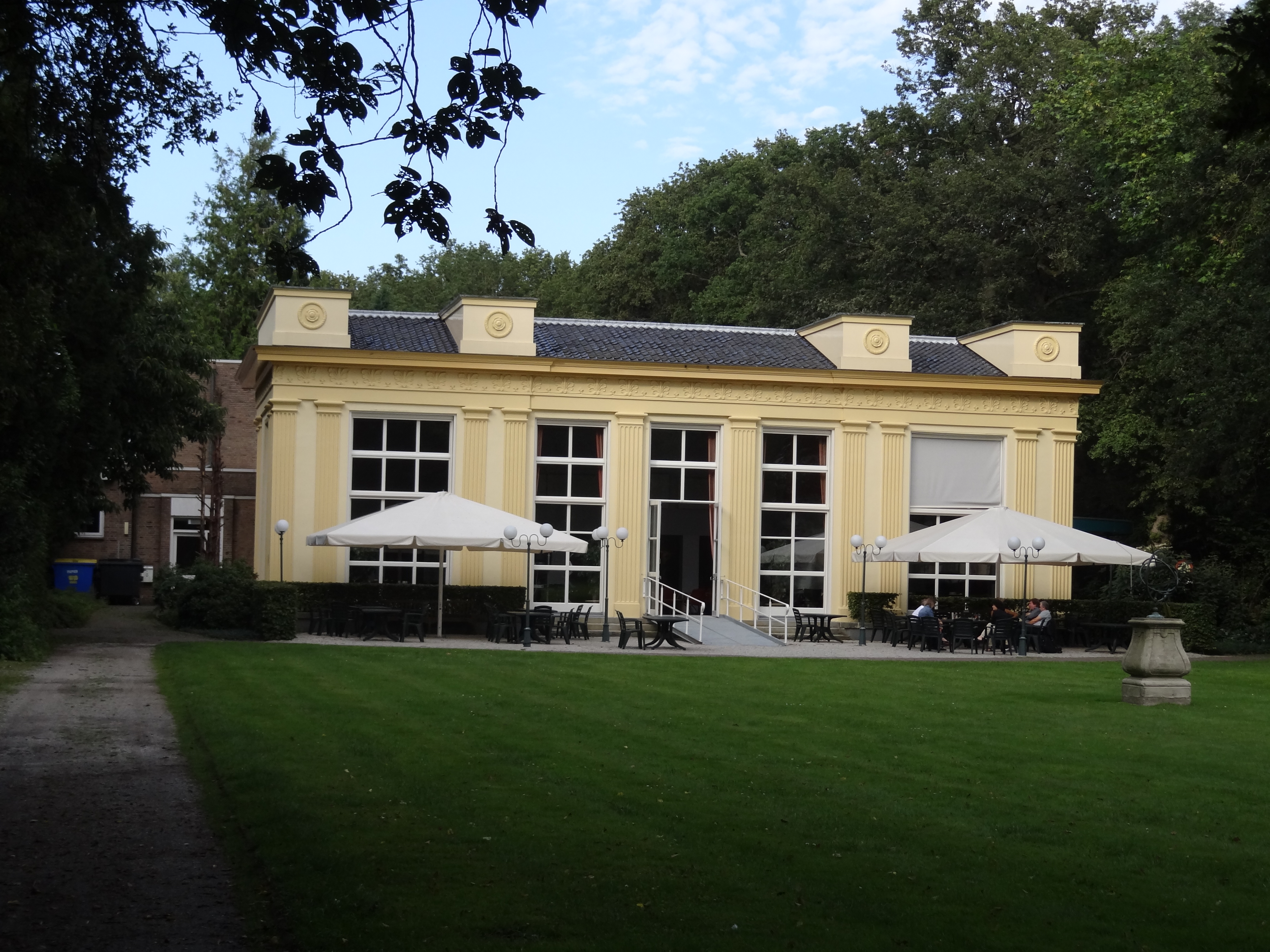
Orangerie

The house was built by Johan Hinloopen in 1693 who designed the basic garden and built the orangerie. It passed into Clifford's hands in 1709. The wings on either side of the main building were added after it left the Clifford family. The Clifford banking dynasty went bankrupt in 1772 and the estate went out of the family in 1788. The original editions of the Hortus Cliffortianus and other works of Linnaeus that were written there Musa Cliffortiana, Florens Hartekampi, and Prope Harlemum were sold at auction to generate funds for the Clifford estate.

At the time of Linnaeus' inventory, the garden had 1251 living plant species in the greenhouses, gardens and woods. A recent inventory in 2006 revealed 250 living species today that are all wild remains of the ancient garden.

== See also ==
- Musa Cliffortiana
