= Jack Clifford =

Jack Clifford may refer to:

- Jack Clifford (actor) (1888–1974), also known as Jack "Rube" Clifford, American actor of film and stage
- Jack Clifford (1880–1956), born Virgil James Montani, Italian-born American boxer and ragtime dancer, former husband of Evelyn Nesbit
- Jack Clifford (rugby union) (born 1993), Australian-born rugby union player who played for England
- John Cliff (actor) (1918–2001), born as Jack Clifford, American actor of film and television
