= Hinlopen =

Hinlopen is a surname. Notable people with the surname include:

- Jan Jacobszoon Hinlopen (1626–1666), Dutch cloth merchant
- Jacob J. Hinlopen (1582–1629), Dutch merchant
- Thijmen Jacobsz Hinlopen (1572–1637), Dutch merchant and whaler

== See also ==
- Hinlopen Strait (Hinlopenstretet) on Svalbard
