= William H. Clifford =

American politician (1862–1929)

William H. Clifford (April 8, 1862 – 1929) was an American politician who served in the Ohio House of Representatives. He was a Republican. He served two terms in the Ohio House of Representatives from 1894 to 1895 and 1898 to 1899.

He was born in Cleveland. He was married to Carrie Williams Clifford in 1886 and had sons Joshua and Maurice. He is buried at the Woodland Cemetery. The Ohio House of Representatives has a photo of him.

== See also ==
- List of African-American officeholders (1900–1959)
- African American officeholders from the end of the Civil War until before 1900
