= George Clifford III =

Dutch banker

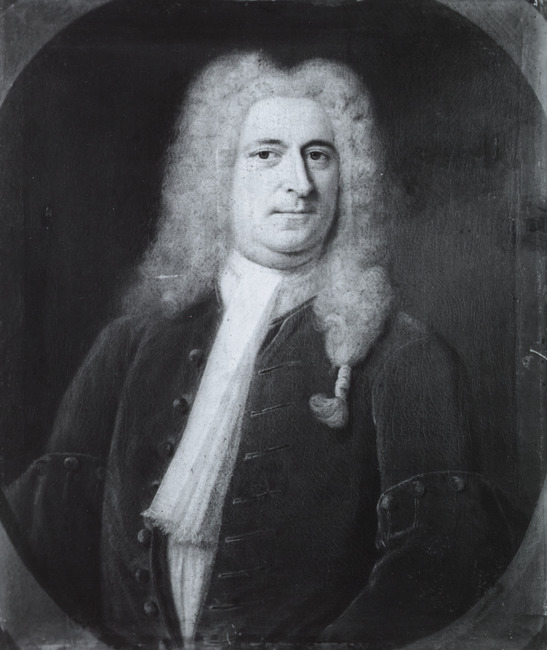
George Clifford

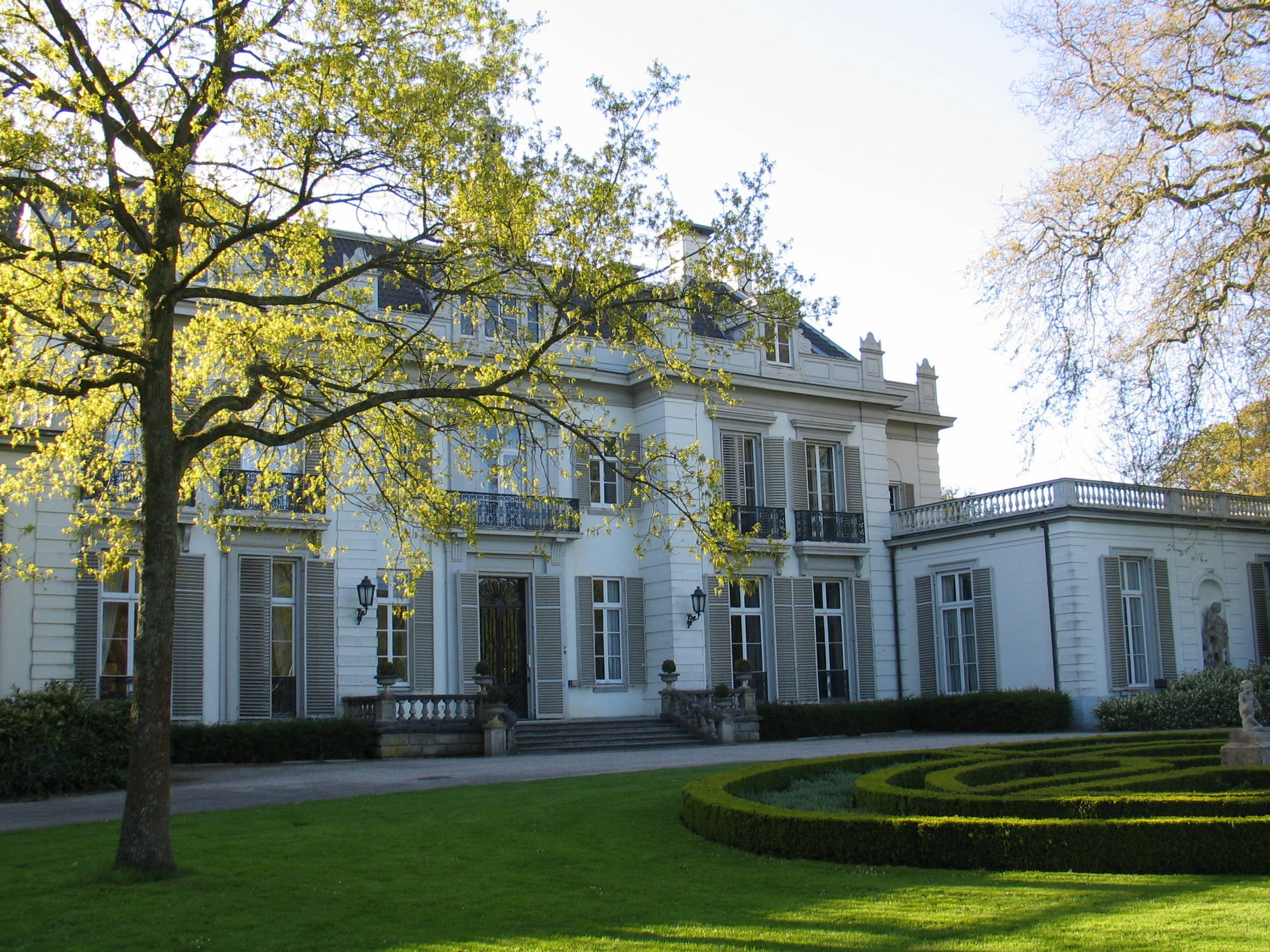
De Hartekamp in 2009

George Clifford III (7 January 1685, Amsterdam – 10 April 1760, Heemstede) was a wealthy Dutch banker and one of the directors of the Dutch East India Company. He is known for his keen interest in plants and gardens.

His summer estate Hartekamp, south of Haarlem in Heemstede near Bennebroek, had a rich variety of plants and he engaged the Swedish naturalist Carl von Linné ("Carl Linnaeus"), who stayed at his estate from 1736 to 1738, to write Hortus Cliffortianus (1737), a masterpiece of early botanical literature published in 1738, and for which Georg Dionysius Ehret did the illustrations.

His grandfather, Englishman George Clifford I, moved from Stow (where his father was rector) to Amsterdam around 1640, beginning an Anglo-Dutch trading and banking dynasty. Subsequent members of the Clifford Family were prominent leaders in Amsterdam.

The garden at Hartekamp was already quite famous before George Clifford bought the estate in 1709 from Johan Hinlopen. Under his ownership, the number of unusual plants grew exponentially. He had 4 hothouses built to house the many tropical plants that he collected through his business connections from all over the world. He was an important friend and seed supplier for botanist Herman Boerhaave, whose summer home (and garden) at Oud Poelgeest was just a short trip away by trekschuit along the Haarlem-Leiden canal known as the Leidsevaart.

In 1736 Clifford became famous for growing the first indoor banana tree, and for this reason Linnaeus was eager to work with him. Many specimens from Clifford's garden were also studied by Linnaeus for his Species Plantarum (1753).

Clifford died in 1760 and left the business to his sons George IV (1708–1757), Jan (1710–1772), Henry (1711–1787) and the estate to Pieter (1712–1788). The banking house of Clifford under George Clifford Jr. fell in 1772 and the estate Hartekamp went out of the family in 1788. Since then the garden has declined and is currently used as a school campus.

== Herbarium ==
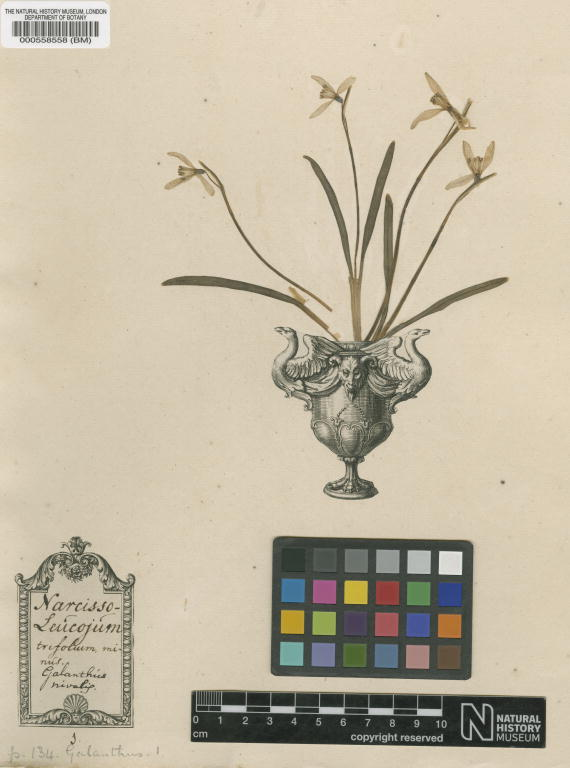
A pressed specimen of Galanthus nivalis (ref: NHM BM000558558) from the herbarium, mounted using a label made to look like an urn.

Clifford's herbarium was acquired by Joseph Banks in 1791 who passed it on to the British Museum of Natural History, where it is published online.

Many of the specimens in the collection are mounted on the paper contemporary with their preservation, but some have been remounted on a type of paper used by the British Museum. They are labelled in various hands, including Clifford's own. Many are mounted using a label made to look like an urn; a method typical of and exclusive to Dutch herbaria of the period. Various styles of urn were used.

== See also ==
- Carl Linnaeus (Carl von Linné)
- Johannes Burman
- Herman Boerhaave
- Hartekamp
- Musa Cliffortiana [de]
- Hortus Cliffortianus
- Dutch East India Company
