= Clifton O. Dummett =

American dentist, educator, and historian

Clifton O. Dummett, Sr. (1919–2011) was a noted American dentist, dental professor and dean, and dental historian.

== Early life and education ==
Dummett was born in Georgetown on May 20, 1919 in what was then British Guiana. He studied at Howard University and Roosevelt University, graduating from Roosevelt in 1941 with a BSc. He then earned his Doctor of Dental Surgery from Northwestern University in 1942. He later earned a master's degree in periodontics from Northwestern University and a master's of public health from the University of Michigan. He was the first African-American to earn a master's of public health.

== Career ==
Dummett became dean of the Meharry Medical College school of dentistry in Nashville, Tennessee in 1947, becoming the youngest dean in the United States at age 28. In 1949, he resigned his deanship at Meharry in protest of a regional plan for education in the southern states that would further promote racial inequality. After leaving Meharry, he became the chief of dental service at the Tuskegee Veterans Administration Medical Center. In 1954 he enlisted in the United States Air Force. In 1966 he was appointed chief of dental service at the Veterans Administration Research Hospital in Chicago, Illinois and associate professor of periodontics at Northwestern University. Also in 1966, he joined the faculty of the University of Southern California, where he stayed until his retirement in 1989. In 1969, Dummett was appointed president of the International Association for Dental Research (IADR), and was the first African-American president of the association.

Dummett authored over 300 articles in his academic career, and served as editor-in-chief of the National Dental Association for twenty-two years, beginning in 1953.
