= Cliffe =

Cliffe may refer to:

== Places in England ==
- Cliffe, Kent, a village
- Cliffe, Richmondshire, North Yorkshire, a village and civil parish
- Cliffe, Selby, North Yorkshire, a village and civil parish
- Cliffe, a village that is now a part of Lewes, Sussex
- Cliffe Hill, east of Lewes
- Cliffe Fort, a disused artillery fort at the mouth of the Thames River

== People ==
- Bruce Cliffe (born 1946), New Zealand businessman and former politician
- Frederic Cliffe (1857–1931), English composer, organist and teacher
- Fred E. Cliffe (1885–1957), English songwriter
- Jess Cliffe (born 1987), American video game designer
- Joel Cliffe (born 1980), English former first-class cricketer
- Lionel Cliffe (1936–2013), English political economist and activist
- Michael Cliffe (1903–1964), British politician
- Rebecca Cliffe (born 1990), British zoologist

== Other uses ==
- The Cliffe, a residence in Peppermint Grove, Western Australia
- Cliffe railway station, Cliffe-at-Hoo, Kent, England
- Cliffe railway station, renamed Hemingbrough railway station, Hemingbrough, North Yorkshire, England
