= Clifford family (bankers) =

Noble family

Clifford
- family
- Country: Netherlands; United Kingdom
- Founded: 16th century
- Founder: John Clifford

The Clifford family was a family of bankers, merchants, and regents of English descent who were active in Amsterdam during the sixteenth through eighteenth centuries. In the first half of the 18th century, the Clifford bank was second only to Pels, the greatest merchant bank in Europe at that time. The family originated in northern England, although the surname originated in the village of Clifford, Herefordshire. Northern England was the home of the noble Clifford family, since Roger Clifford was born in Cumberland and died at Brough Castle in Westmorland. There is no evidence that the Clifford banking family is descended from a nobleman named Clifford who fought for William I of England.

== History ==
=== Richard and Henry Clifford ===
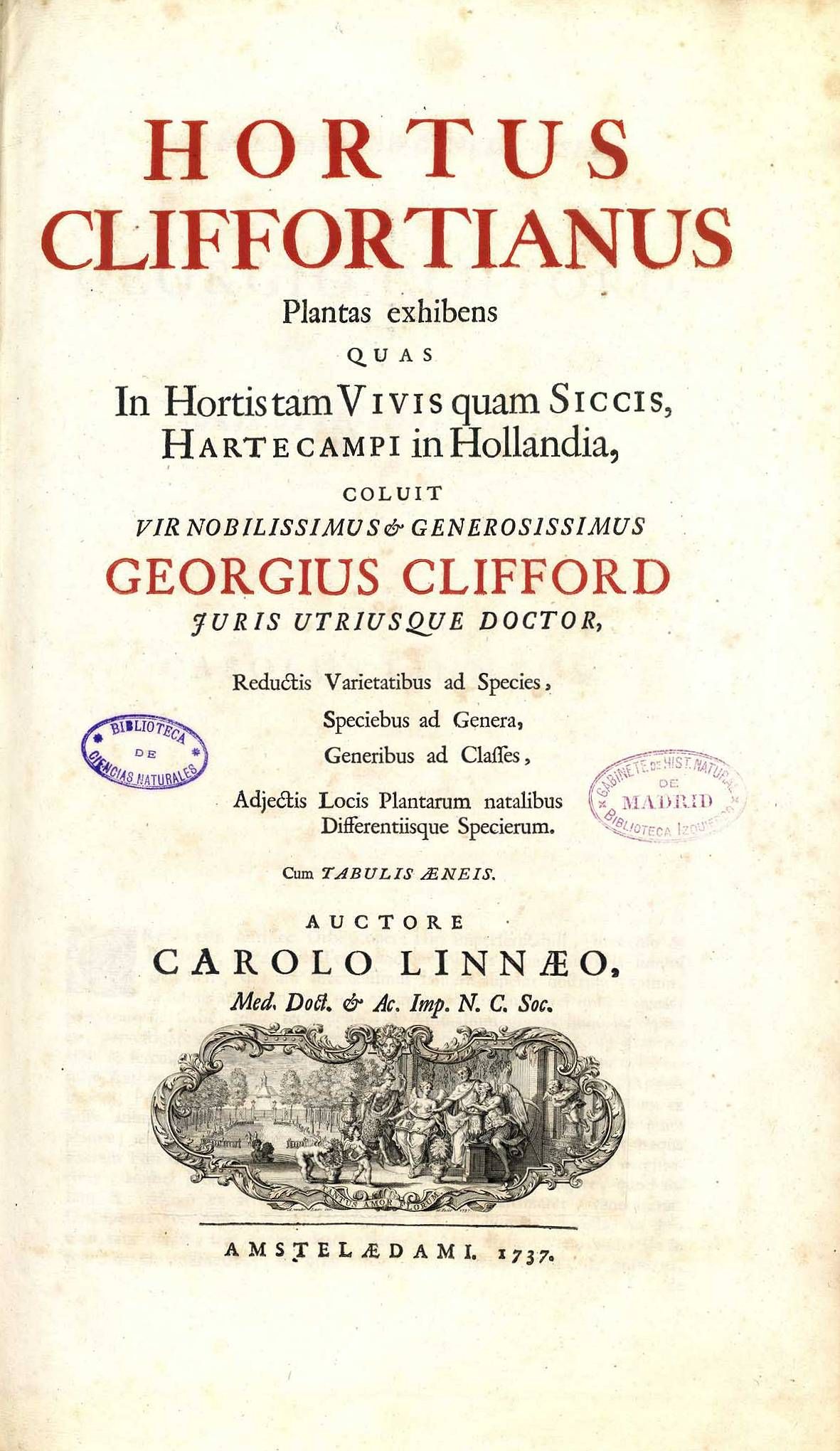
Linnaeus Hortus Cliffortianus frontpage

The oldest known ancestor is John Clifford, who was a tenant in Aylsham. His son, Richard Clifford, was born in Aylsham. He studied at Corpus Christi College, Cambridge, and in 1569 became rector of Landbeach, a village just north of Cambridge, though he was also canon of Stow. His wife was Alice; her maiden name is unknown.

Henry Clifford (1576-1628) was born in Landbeach to Richard and Alice Clifford. He also studied at Corpus Christi.

=== George Clifford I ===
Henry's son, George Clifford, relocated to Amsterdam between 1634 and 1640. This George, or Joris (1623-1680) married Abigail Bouwens in 1648 and spent the rest of his life on the Zeedijk. From 1654 on, he had an account with the Amsterdamsche Wisselbank. Six of his children were baptised in Amsterdam's Presbyterian Church and two in the Oude Kerk. In 1664, he traded on Maryland and Barbados. (By 1660, Barbados had generated more trade than all the other English colonies combined.) According to the inventory after his death, he traded in tea, tobacco, sugar, cotton, spices, herbs, and dyes like indigo and dragon's blood.

=== George Clifford II ===
George Clifford II (1657-1727, son of George I) began his career on the Leliegracht. He represented the Bank of England. From 1696 to 1700, he was director of the Sociëteit van Suriname. In 1707, Clifford & Co. had the largest balance at the Bank of Amsterdam. In 1709, George bought the estate Hartekamp in Heemstede for 22,000 guilders from Johan Hinlopen.

From 1701 on, George and his brother Isaäc (1665-1729) ran their father's business under the name 'George en Isaäc Clifford & Co.'. The brothers split in 1713, before or after the bank arranged a loan to Charles VI, Holy Roman Emperor, and to Augustus III of Poland.

=== George Clifford III ===
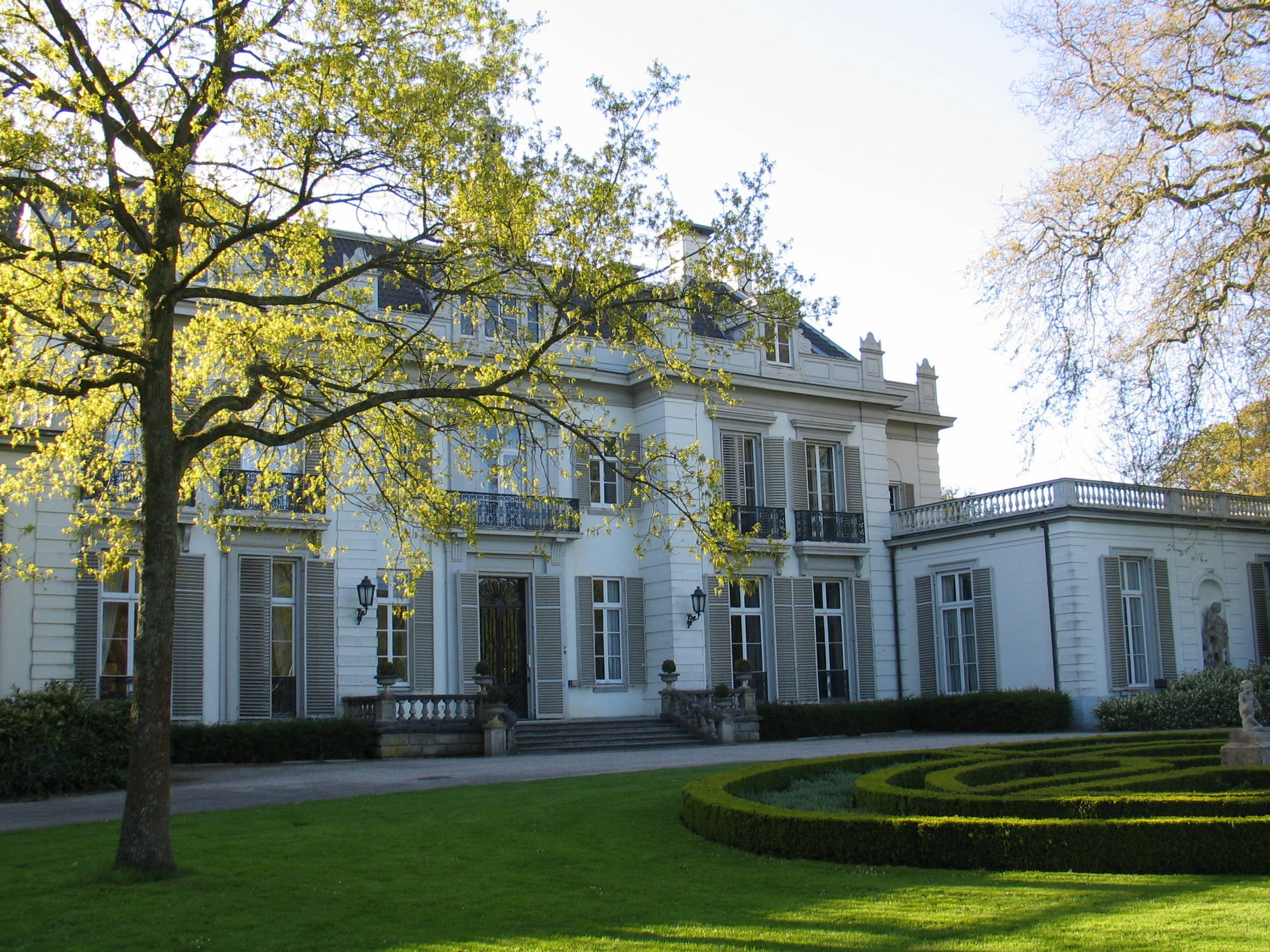
The Hartekamp in Heemstede

George Clifford II's only son was George Clifford (1685-1760), who is best known as the patron of the Swedish naturalist Carl Linnaeus, whom he employed as 'hortulanus' to catalog the family's unique collection of plants, herbarium, and library. The result was Linnaeus' book Hortus Cliffortianus, whose publication costs were paid by George Clifford III. A large part of his botanical collection, the Clifford Herbarium, is in the Natural History Museum in London.

=== Later history ===
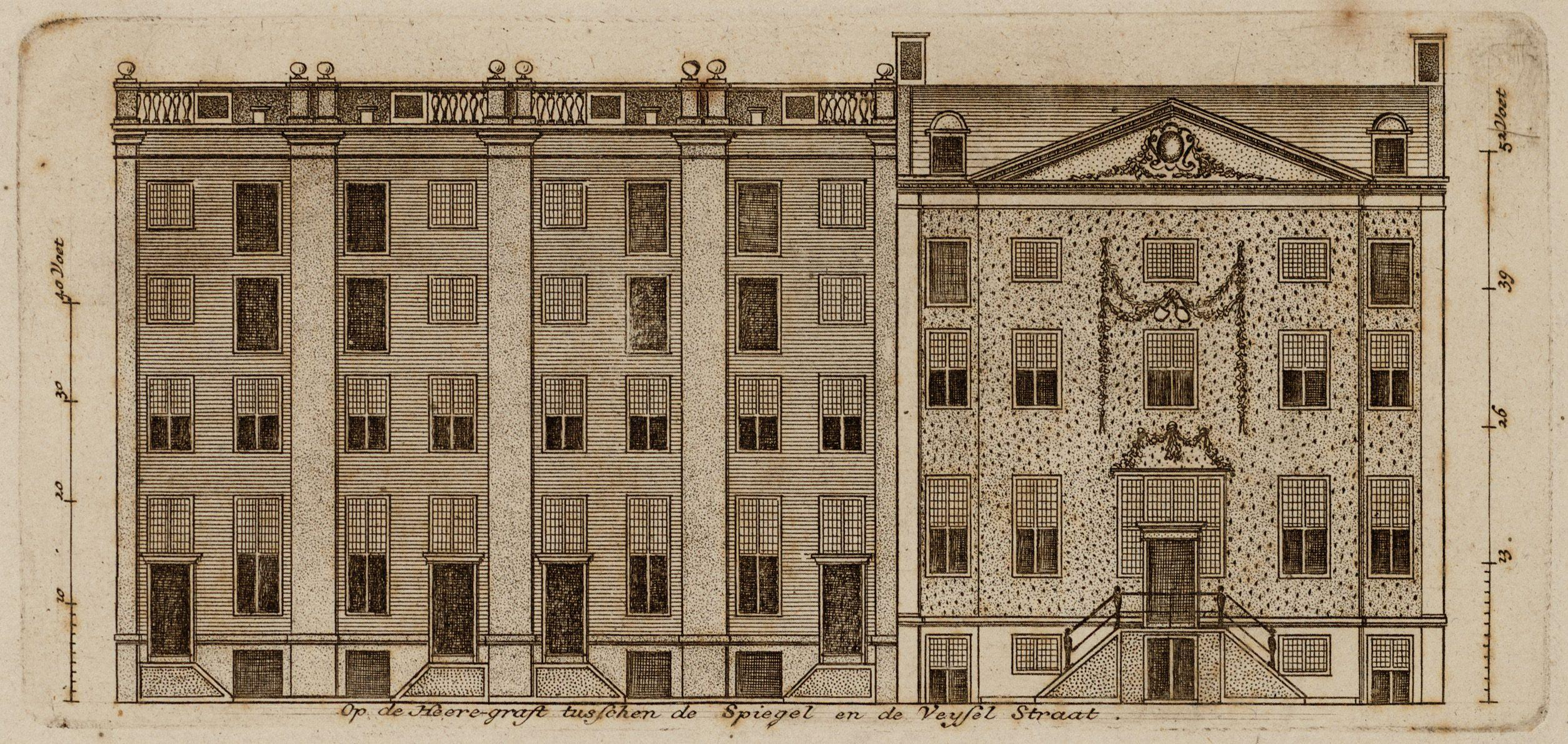
Herengracht 480 on the right, owned by Pieter Clifford (1712-1788)

In the mid-18th century, members of the family began to enter the city-government of Amsterdam. The Cliffords regularly lent money to banks in Saint Petersburg and Moscow, the English and Danish governments, and owned plantations in Suriname.

In May 1772, with £15,000, the Cliffords and Muilman representing Van Seppenwolde organised an exchange circuit in the hope of making a profit on rising EIC shares. (Clifford acted in breach of the stock exchange contract). The advantage would lie in the commission they charged between themselves. Jan Clifford had apparently given too much credit on less solid bills of exchange. Both Clifford's sons tried to plug the gap after their father's death by privately undertaking bold speculation in the EIC and the Bank of England. However, the continued decline of these funds caused the speculation to fail. In December the company went bankrupt during the Crisis of 1772 after price overshooting on the Amsterdam and London stock market, bringing down a number of other bankers and their firms.

In the mid-19th century, the Clifford family moved to The Hague. The family archive was lost in an incendiary raid on Dalfsen during World War II.

== See also ==
- List of banks in the Netherlands

== Bibliography ==
- (in Dutch) L. Albers, A.J. Kramer, J.L.P.M. Krol & I. van Thiel-Stroman. Het landgoed de Hartekamp in Heemstede. Heemstede, VOHB, 1982.
- (in Dutch) Johan E. Elias. De vroedschap van Amsterdam 1578-1795. Haarlem, 1905. Twee delen. Herdruk in 1963.
