= Cliff Lee (potter) =

American ceramic artist

Cliff Lee (born 1951 in Vienna, Austria) is an American ceramic artist. He is known for his meticulously carved and glazed porcelain pots. In particular, he is noted for his celadon, oxblood, imperial yellow and oil spot glazes and for carvings in the shape of cabbages, peaches, and lotus flowers.

== Biography ==
Imperial Yellow Dish with Pedestal (1988) by Cliff Lee at the Renwick Gallery in Washington, DC in 2022

He was born in Vienna since his father was posted there as ambassador. After their return home he was raised in Taiwan. He left to study in the United States in 1968.

As a young man, Lee studied medicine at Hershey Medical School and became a successful neurosurgeon before deciding to leave medicine and pursue his passion for studio pottery at the age of 27. Taking ceramics courses at James Madison University in Harrisonburg, Virginia, he decided to pursue this new passion. At James Madison, he also met his wife Holly, a jewelry artist now well known in the craft community.

Lee gained prominence through his inclusion in the 1993 show White House Collection of American Crafts, which was curated by Michael Monroe, who was then the director of the Renwick Gallery of the Smithsonian Institution. Lee's work is now included in the permanent collections of several museums, including the National Museum of American Art at the Smithsonian Institution, the Yale University Art Gallery, and the Peabody Essex Museum. He has also won numerous awards for his porcelain, including Best of Ceramics at the American Craft Exposition, the Craftsmen's Choice Award at the Smithsonian Craft Show, and the Award of Excellence in Craft at the Westchester Craft Show. More recently, Cliff has shown his work at the Palm Beach Show, held every year at the Palm Beach County Convention Center. He also continues to show his work at the Philadelphia Museum of Art Craft Show.

He lives in Stevens Township, Pennsylvania.

== Literature ==
- Michael Monroe. The White House Collection of American Mamas (New York: Henry N. Abrams. 1995)
- Nicholas Bell, Ulysses Grant Dietz, and Andrew Wagner History in the Making: Renwick Craft Invitational 2011 (Washington, D.C. and London: Smithsonian American Art Museum in association with Scala, 2011)
