= Hortus Cliffortianus =

1737 book

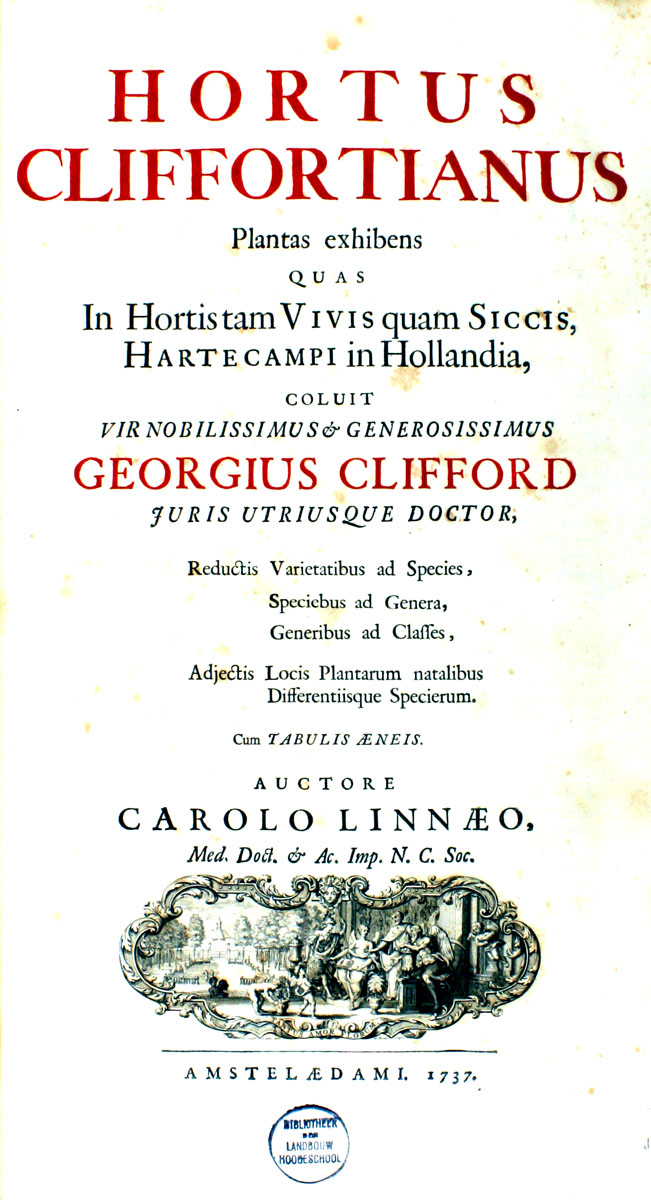
Title page of Hortus Cliffortianus

The Hortus Cliffortianus is a work of early botanical literature published in 1737.

The work was a collaboration between Carl Linnaeus and the illustrator Georg Dionysius Ehret, financed by George Clifford in 1735–1736. Clifford was a wealthy Amsterdam banker, a governor of the Dutch East India Company, and a keen botanist with a large herbarium. He had the income to attract the talents of botanists such as Linnaeus and artists like Ehret and Jan Wandelaar. Together at the Clifford summer estate Hartecamp, which was located south of Haarlem in Heemstede near Bennebroek, they produced the first scholarly classification of an English garden.
