= George Clifford (footballer) =

English footballer

Personal information
- Date of birth: 10 February 1896
- Place of birth: Sandiacre Derbyshire, England
- Position: Right back

Senior career*
Years	Team	Apps	(Gls)
- Sutton Junction
1924–1930	Portsmouth	175	(0)
1931	Mansfield Town	39	(0)
- Ilkeston United
- * Club domestic league appearances and goals

George Clifford (10 February 1896 – 3 January 1964) was an English footballer who played in the Football League for Mansfield Town and Portsmouth. He was born in Harrogate.
