= Anne Clifford (theologian) =

American theologian (1944–2024)

Anne Clifford CSJ
- Born: June 15, 1944; Pennsylvania, U.S.
- Died: October 2, 2024 (aged 80); Pennsylvania, U.S.
- Occupation(s): College professor, theologian, religious sister

Anne Marie Clifford CSJ (June 15, 1944 – October 2, 2024) was an American religious sister and feminist theologian. She was an associate professor of theology at Duquesne University from 1988 to 2007, and held a named chair in Catholic studies at Iowa State University from 2008 to 2019.

== Early life and education ==
Clifford was born in Pennsylvania, the daughter of John Robert Clifford and Julia Agnes Goodwin Clifford. She graduated from St. John High School in Uniontown, Pennsylvania, in 1962. "I always had a love for science", she later recalled of her childhood. "I remember reading through books and encyclopedias when I was in the second grade and trying to memorize things like the order of the planets. I was the only girl in the county to get the insect badge in Girl Scouts."

Clifford became a member of the Congregation of Saint Joseph (CSJ) in Baden, Pennsylvania, her teens. She earned a bachelor's degree at Carlow University, in history education, and master's degree from Catholic Theological Union in Chicago, and completed doctoral studies in theology at Catholic University of America, with a dissertation titled "The relation of science and religion/theology in the thought of Langdon Gilkey" (1988).

== Career ==
Clifford taught in Catholic schools in Pennsylvania early in her career. She was a lecturer at Carlow University in Pittsburgh from 1976 to 1981, and at Trinity College in Maryland from 1986 to 1988. She was associate professor of theology at Duquesne University from 1988 to 2007, and director of the graduate program in theology. From 2007 to 2008, she was the Walter and Mary Tuohy Chair of Interreligious Studies at John Carroll University. She became the Msgr. James A. Supple Chair in Catholic Studies at Iowa State University in 2008. She spoke at Seton Hill University in 2010. She retired with emeritus status in 2019.

From 1994 to 1996, Clifford consulted on environmental justice for the United States Conference of Catholic Bishops. She was president of the College Theology Society from 2006 to 2008, and vice-president of the Catholic Theology Society. She was a member of the board of directors for the Catholic Theological Society of America. She received the College Theology Society's Presidential Award in 2018.

== Publications ==
In addition to her own writings, Clifford was a contributing editor to The New Catholic Encyclopedia.

- "Creation" (1991)
- "Feminist Perspectives on Science: Implications for an Ecological Theology of Creation" (1992)
- "When being human becomes truly earthly: An ecofeminist proposal for solidarity"
- "Foundations for a Catholic Ecological Theology of God" (1996)
- "The Image of God: Gender Models in Judaeo-Christian Tradition" (1997)
- "Biological Evolution and the Human Soul: A Theological Proposal for Generationism" (1998)
- Introducing Feminist Theology (2001)
- Christology: Memory, Inquiry and Practice (2003, co-editor with Anthony Godzieba)
- "An ecological theology of creaturely kinship" (2008)
- "Identity and Vision at Catholic Colleges and Universities" (2008)
- "Trees, Living Symbols of Peace and Hope, Wangari Maathai and Ecofeminist Theology" (2012)
- "Catholicism and Ian Barbour on Theology and Science" (2017)
- "The Significance of Pope Francis's Prophetic Call:'Care for Our Common Home' for Northern Appalachia"

== Personal life ==
Clifford died in 2024, at the age of 80.
