= Cliff Edwards (footballer) =

English footballer (1921–1989)

Personal information
- Full name: Clifford Ivor Edwards
- Date of birth: 8 March 1921
- Place of birth: Staffordshire, England (Note: Sources disagree whether Edwards was born in Burntwood or Cannock.)
- Date of death: March 1989 (aged 67–68)
- Place of death: Walsall, England
- Position: Wing half

Senior career*
Years	Team	Apps	(Gls)
- Cannock Town
1946–1948	West Bromwich Albion	40	(1)
1948–1950	Bristol City	33	(3)
- Gravesend and Northfleet
- * Club domestic league appearances and goals

Clifford Ivor Edwards (8 March 1921 – March 1989) was an English professional footballer who played as a wing half for West Bromwich Albion and Bristol City.
