= John MacFarlane Cliff =

- Born: 28 October 1921
- Died: 3 July 1972 (aged 50); Haslar, Hampshire, England
- Scientific career
- Fields: Medicine
- Workplaces: Addenbrooke's Hospital, Royal Hospital Haslar

John MacFarlane Cliff FRCP (28 October 1921–3 July 1972) was a senior British physician, and Professor of Naval Medicine at Royal Hospital Haslar.

== Biography ==
Born on 28 October 1921, John MacFarlane Cliff was educated at Bedford School, at Christ's College, Cambridge, and at St Thomas's Hospital Medical School. He was house surgeon at Addenbrooke's Hospital before gaining a commission in the Royal Navy Medical Service in 1946. He was elected as a Fellow of the Royal College of Physicians in 1966 and appointed as Professor of Naval Medicine at Royal Hospital Haslar in 1971. He published widely on reactive arthritis, asthma, mediastinal emphysema, and iatrogenesis.

Professor John MacFarlane Cliff died in Haslar, Hampshire on 3 July 1972.
