= Leslie Cliff (figure skater) =

British figure skater

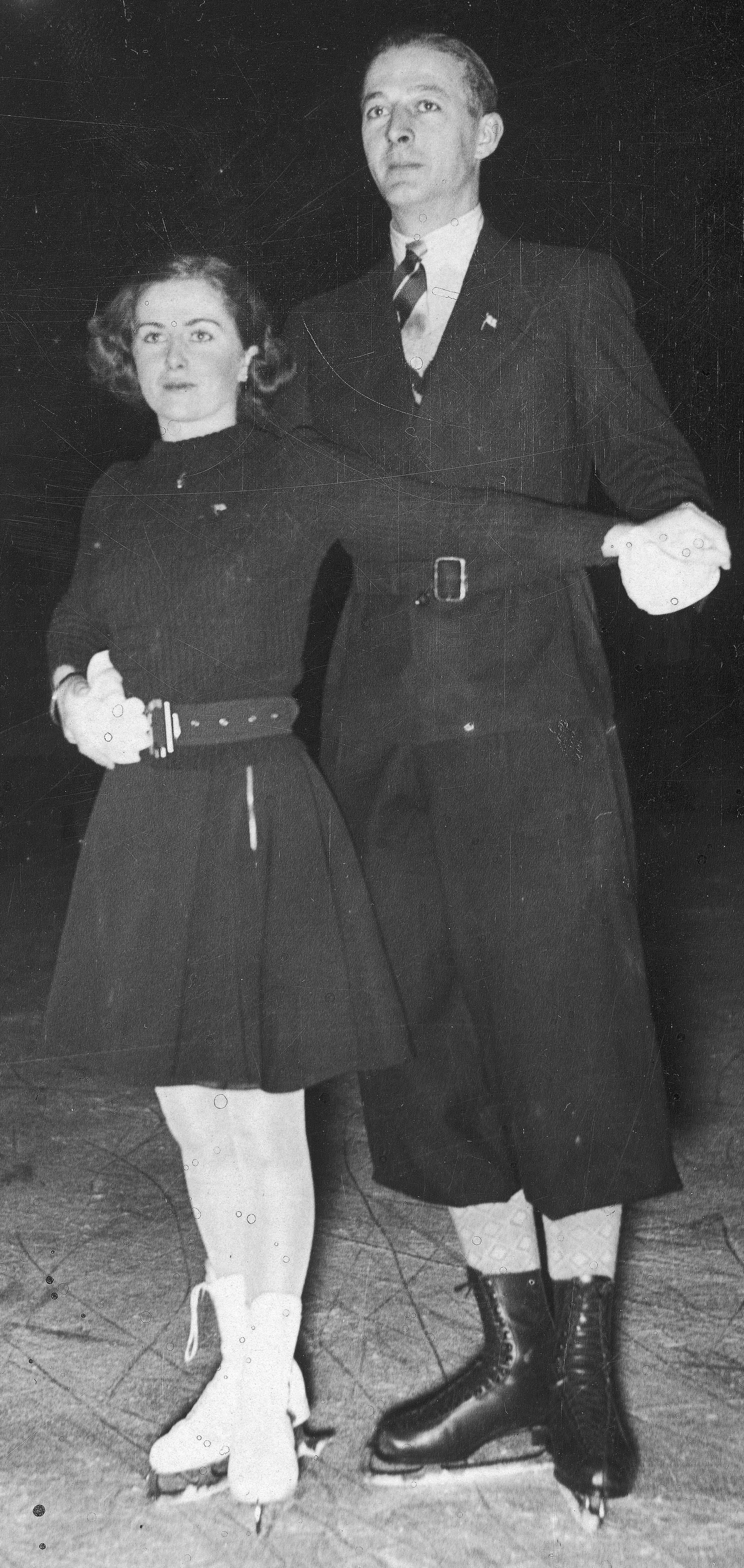
- Cliff with his partner Violet Cliff at the 1936 European Championships

Personal information
- Full name: Leslie Harold Talbot Cliff
- Born: 5 June 1908 Naas, Ireland
- Died: 2 August 1969 (aged 61) Jersey, Channel Islands

Figure skating career
- Country: United Kingdom
- Skating club: Bournemouth
Medal record
Representing United Kingdom
Pairs Figure skating
World Championships
Bronze medal – third place	1937 Vienna	Pairs
Bronze medal – third place	1936 Paris	Pairs
European Championships
Silver medal – second place	1936 Berlin	Pairs

Leslie Howard Talbot Cliff (5 June 1908 – 2 August 1969) was a British pair skater who competed with his wife, Violet Cliff. The couple finished seventh at the 1936 Winter Olympics. That same year, they won the silver medal at the European Figure Skating Championships and the bronze at the World Figure Skating Championships. They won another bronze at the 1937 World Championships.

== Results ==
(with Cliff)

Event	1933	1934	1935	1936	1937	1938	1939
Winter Olympic Games				7th			
World Championships				3rd	3rd	4th	5th
European Championships	4th		7th	2nd	4th		
