= Sarah Kliff =

American journalist and health policy reporter

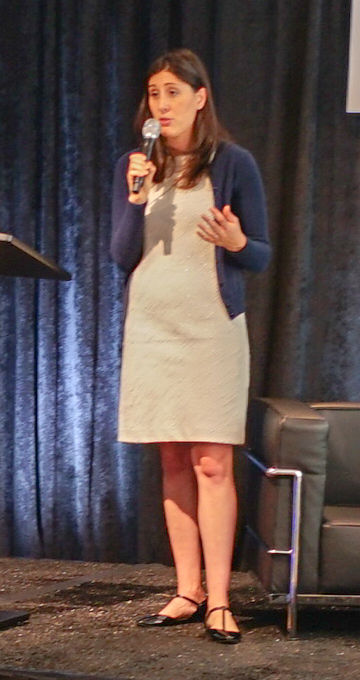
Image of Sarah Kliff

Sarah Kliff is an American journalist and health policy reporter, recognized for her investigative work on the U.S. healthcare system. She is currently an investigative reporter at The New York Times, focusing on health policy and economics.

== Education ==
Kliff earned a bachelor's degree from Washington University in St. Louis in 2007.

== Career ==
Kliff began her journalism career at Newsweek and later joined Politico, where she covered the implementation of the Affordable Care Act (ACA). She then moved to The Washington Post as a health policy reporter and was a founding writer of Wonkblog, a policy blog aimed at making complex policy topics accessible.

In 2014, Kliff became a senior policy correspondent at Vox, where she launched the "Emergency Room Billing" project, an initiative which involved collecting and analyzing over 1,000 emergency room bills submitted by readers to expose hidden and predatory billing practices in the U.S. healthcare system. The project led to multiple bills introduced by various lawmakers targeting surprise medical fees, and the reversal of over $100,000 in medical debt.

In 2019, Kliff joined The New York Times to continue her investigative reporting on healthcare costs, surprise medical billing, and federal health policy, including the COVID-19 pandemic response.

== Recognition ==
For her work on emergency room billing practices, Kliff was a finalist for the 2019 Award for Investigative Reporting from the National Institute for Health Care Management (NIHC) Foundation, a non-profit which is backed by the commercial health insurance industry. She has also received awards from the Association of Health Care Journalists and the Annenberg School of Journalism.

== Personal life ==
She resides in Washington, D.C., with her husband, son, daughter, and their dog named Goose.
