= John Clifford (choreographer) =

American choreographer

- Born: John Charles Povilaitis; June 22, 1947; Los Angeles, California, U.S.
- Education: Hollywood High School; School of American Ballet
- Occupations: Ballet dancer, choreographer
- Years active: c. 1958 – present

John Charles Clifford (né Povilaitis; June 12, 1947) is an American producer, director, author, choreographer, and a dancer. He was the founder and artistic director of the original Los Angeles Ballet (1974–1985) and the chamber-sized touring ensemble Ballet of Los Angeles (1988–1991). Before that time, Clifford was a principal dancer and a choreographer (8 ballets before age 26) with George Balanchine’s New York City Ballet (1966–1974). Balanchine invited him back as a guest artist numerous times, and his last performances with the company were in 1980.

== Early life ==
Born June 12, 1947, at Queen of Angels Hospital in Los Angeles, Clifford spent his formative years in Hollywood. He is the son of Robert Charles Clifford (né Povilaitis)—of the popular vaudeville acrobatic team, Park & Clifford—and singer Betty Louise Cadwell. Beginning at age 11, he studied ballet with Katherine Etienne and then jazz and tap with Eugene Loring, before attending Hollywood High School, whre he majored in music and art.

== Career ==
Clifford was the artistic director of Robert Redford's Sundance Institute Video/Choreographer Program and produced “Pas De Deux,” a video distributed by Video Artists International (VAI).

His new for-profit dance company Los Angeles Dance Theater produced a dance version of Casablanca, Casablanca: The Dance, for Warner Bros Theatre Ventures, Inc. The production premiered on April 5, 2005, at the Great Hall of the People in Beijing, China.

Clifford is a senior répétiteur for the George Balanchine Trust and has staged numerous Balanchine ballets for companies, including the Paris Opera Ballet (9), the Bolshoi Ballet (3), the Mariinsky Ballet (2), and the San Francisco Ballet (3), and most of the ballet companies in the United States. As a choreographer, companies such as the Deutsche Oper Ballet, Zurich Ballet, Le Ballet de Monte Carlo, Ballet du Nord (France), Maggio Danza, Rome Opéra Ballet, and the Teatro Colon in Buenos Aires produced an all-Clifford program in 1985.

His autobiography, Balanchine's Apprentice: From Hollywood to New York and Back, published by the University Press of Florida, has received reviews in the Wall Street Journal, Publishers Weekly, and Library Journal.
