= Buitenplaats =

Summer residence for Dutch townspeople

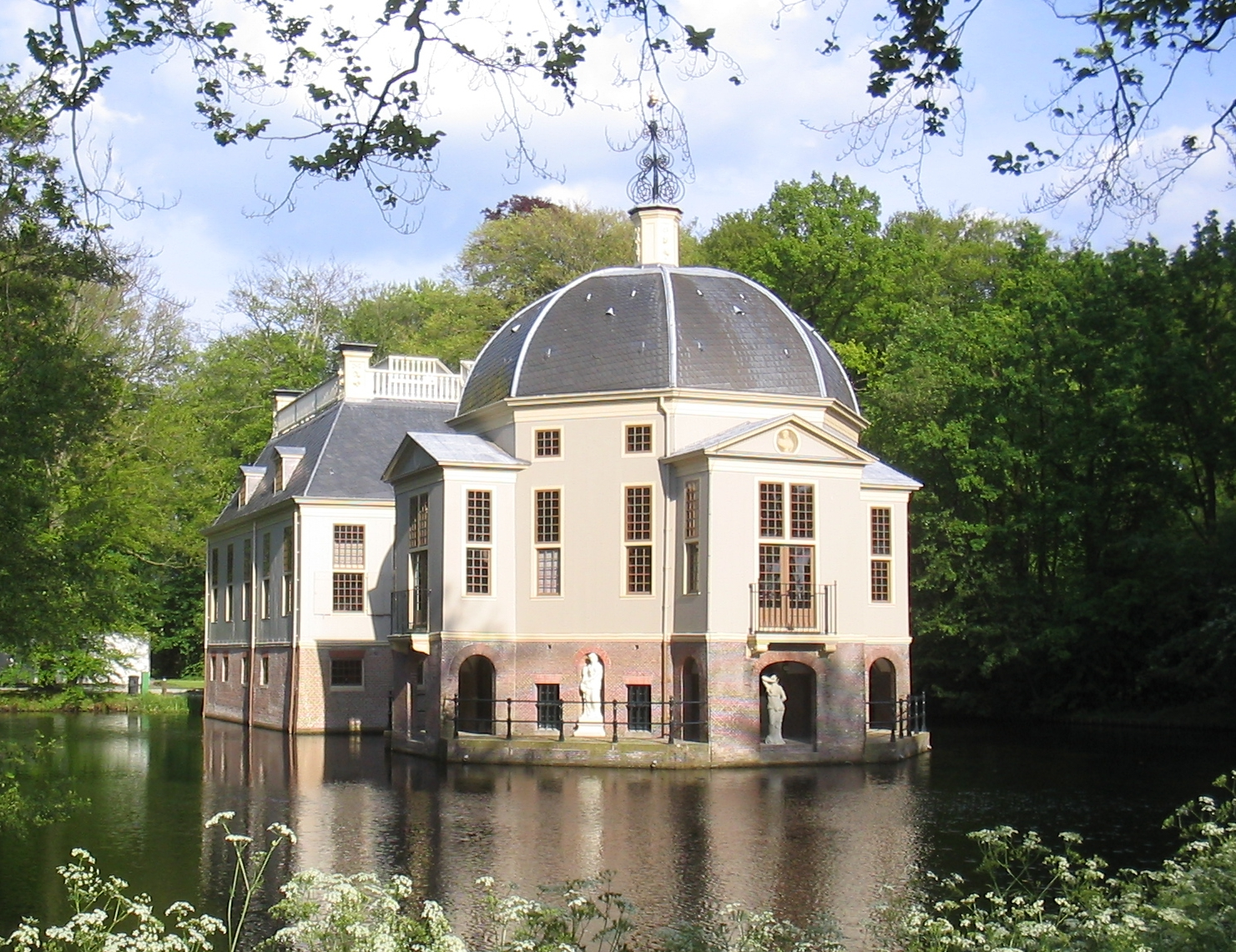
Buitenplaats Trompenburgh in 's-Graveland

A buitenplaats (Dutch pronunciation: [ˈbœytə(m)ˌplaːts], lit. 'outside place') was a summer residence for rich townspeople in the Netherlands. During the Dutch Golden Age of the 17th century, many traders and city administrators in Dutch towns became very wealthy. Many of them bought country estates, at first mainly to collect rents, however soon mansions started to be built there, which were used only during the summer.

== History ==
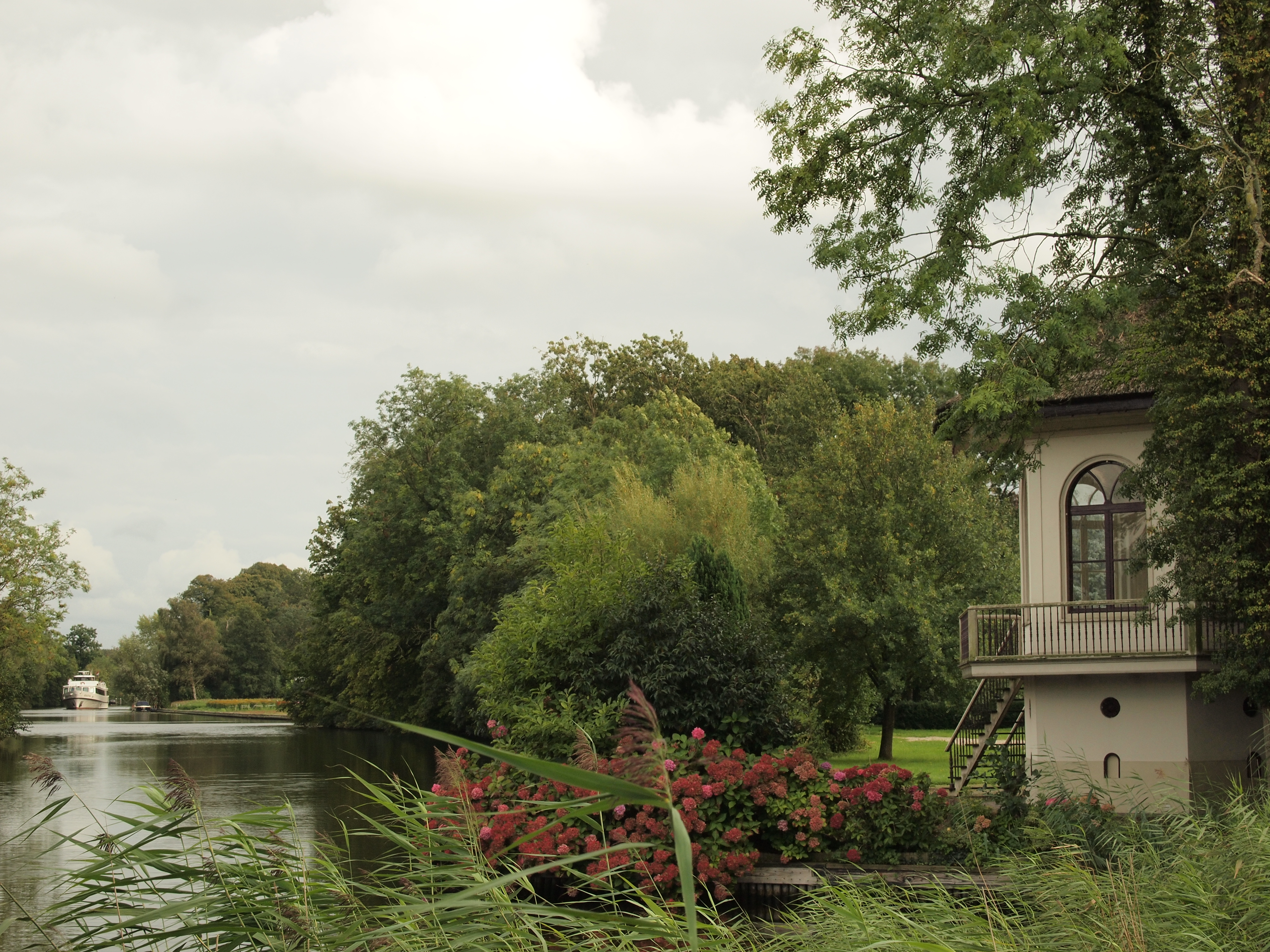
Tea house on the river Vecht, part of Gunterstein

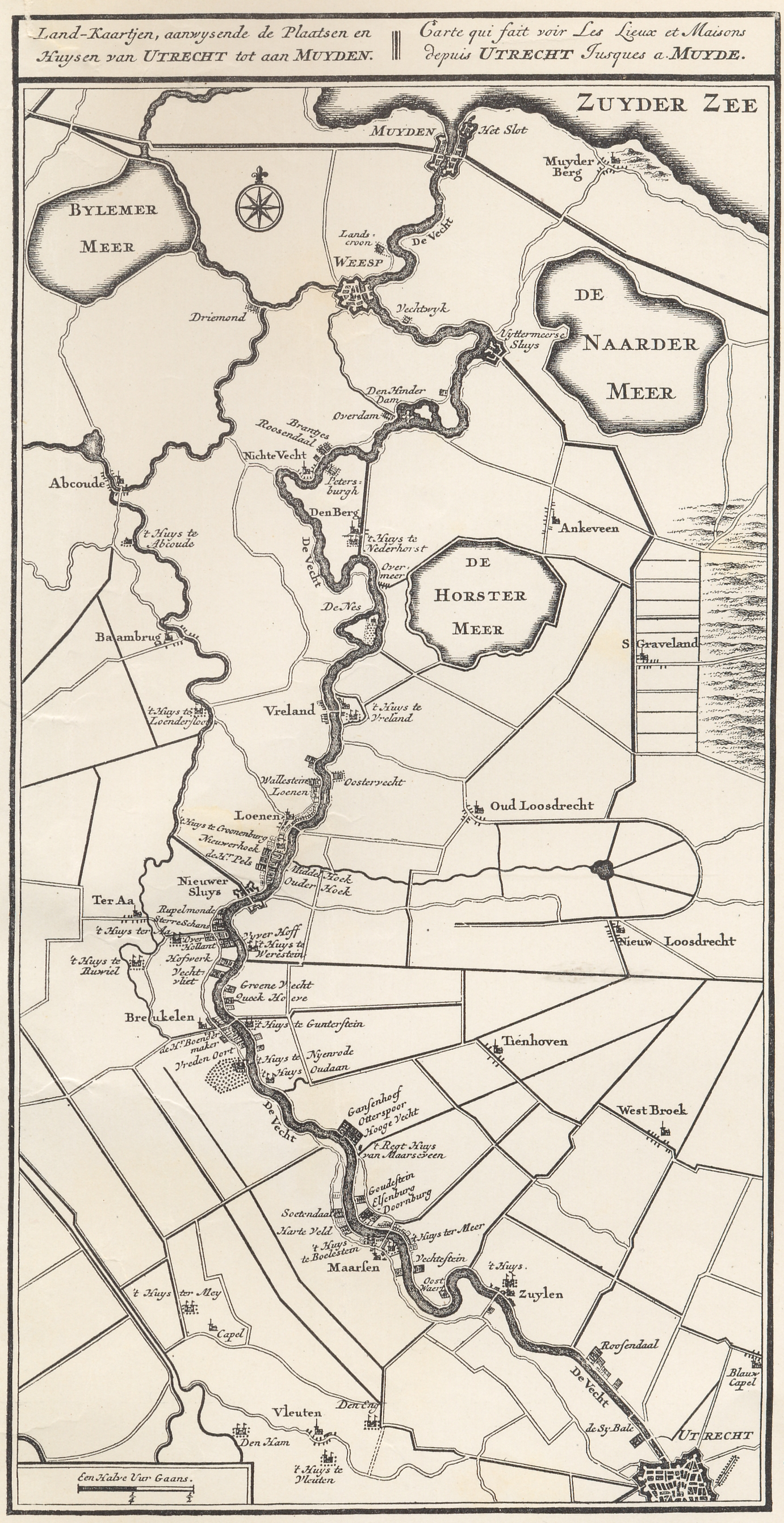
1719 map with castles and buitenplaatsen along the Vecht

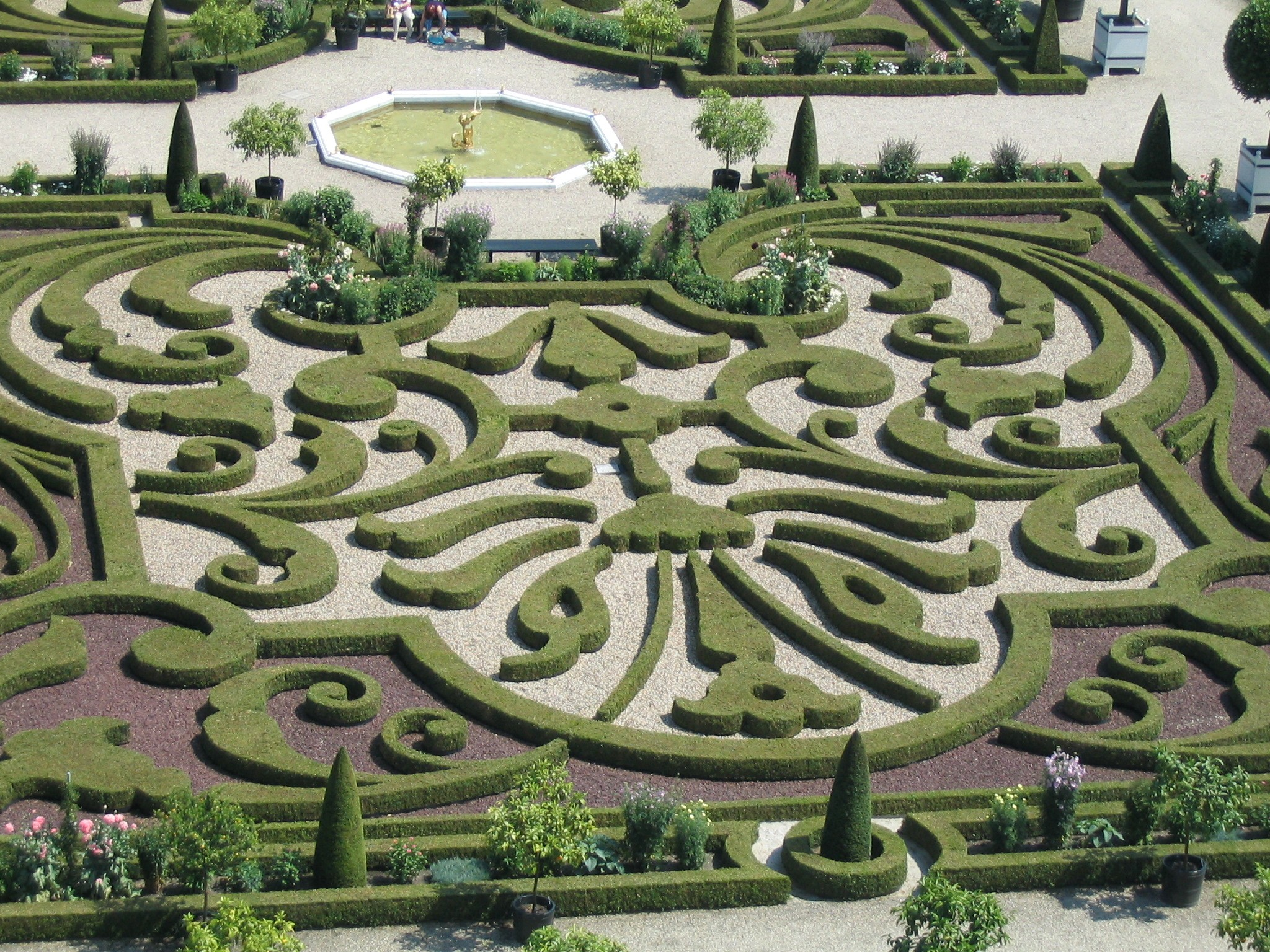
Detail of the garden of Het Loo Palace today, an 18th-century show-garden in the popular "French style"

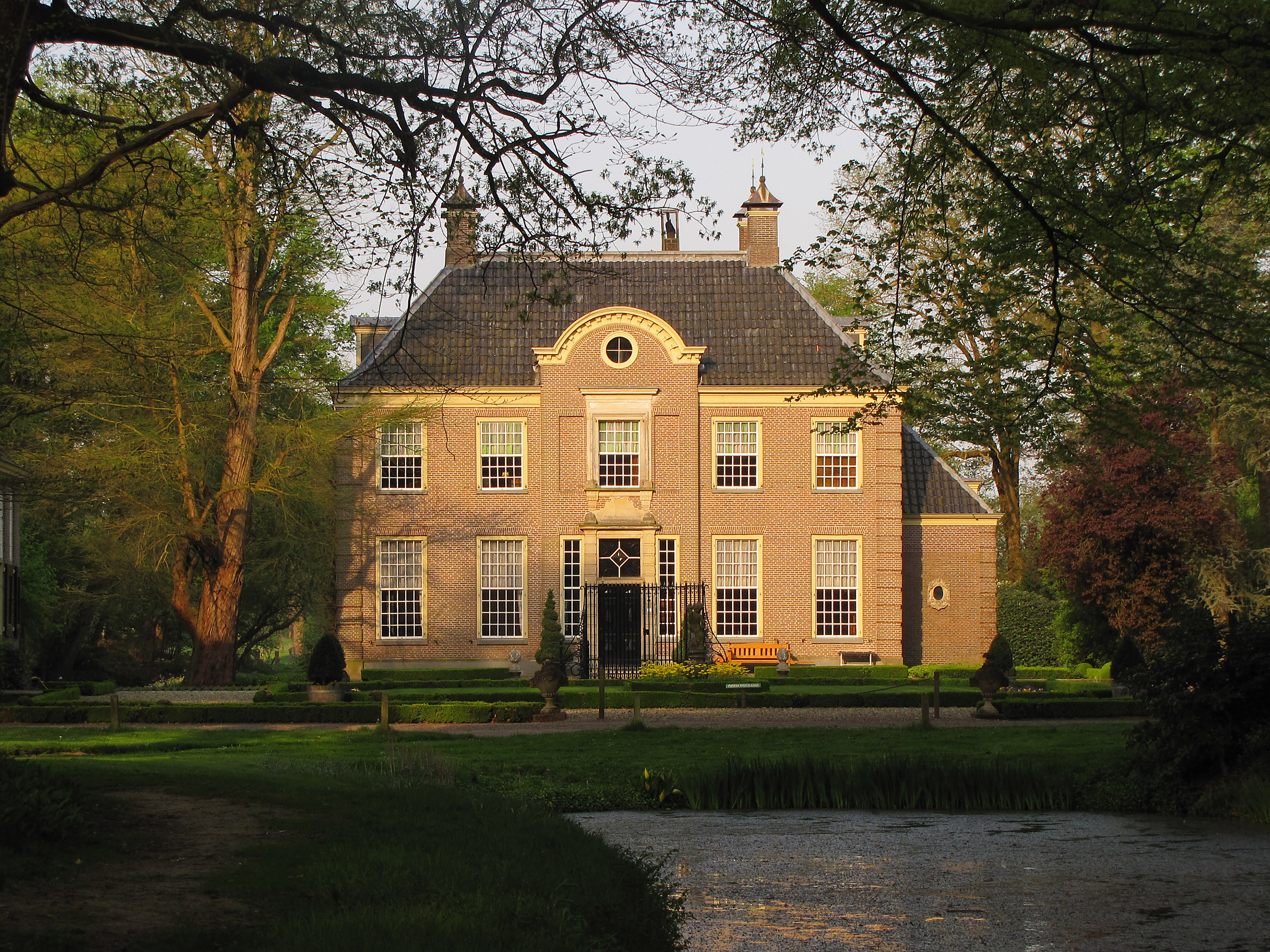
Den Aalshorst in Dalfsen

Buitenplaatsen or buitenhuizen could be found in picturesque regions which were easily accessible from the owner's home in town, and they were near a clean water source. Most wealthy families kept their children in buitenhuizen during the summer to flee the putrid canals of the cities and the accompanying onset of cholera and other diseases. Though most buitenhuizen have been demolished, examples are still in existence along the river Vecht, the river Amstel, the Spaarne in Kennemerland, the river Vliet and in Wassenaar. Some still exist near former lakes (now polders) like the Watergraafsmeer and Beemster, which were popular too. In the 19th century with improvements in water management, new regions came into fashion, such as the Utrecht Hill Ridge (Utrechtse Heuvelrug) and the area around Arnhem.

Buitenplaatsen are often mistaken for castles; however, a castle usually dates from medieval times and thus was usually founded and owned by nobles, while buitenplaatsen were primarily built and owned by the newly rich bourgeoisie during the late 17th and early 18th centuries. Many buitenhuizen are built on top of the ruins of earlier castles that were destroyed during the Dutch revolt. The owners adopted the castle name, giving themselves a hint of nobility. Like early English country houses, buitenhuizen were only used during the summer. The wealthy owners then returned in the autumn to their residences in Amsterdam, Utrecht, Leiden, The Hague, Haarlem, Dordrecht, and other prominent cities. By the end of the 18th century these places were lined up side by side along the banks of the more prominent rivers. William Thomas Beckford, who published an account of his letters back home from his Grand Tour, traveled by trekschuit from Amsterdam to Utrecht and wrote home on July 2, 1780, with this to say about the buitenhuizen along the Vecht river;

"Both sides of the way are lined with the country-houses and gardens of opulent citizens, as fine as gilt statues and clipped hedges can make them. Their number is quite astonishing: from Amsterdam to Utrecht, full thirty miles, we beheld no other objects than endless avenues and stiff parterres scrawled and flourished in patterns like the embroidery of an old maid’s work-bag."

— William Beckford on the Vecht, 1780,

The core of a buitenplaats was the mansion, a stately building in which the owner and his family were housed. Around it was a garden decorated with fountains and statues. Often there were also an orangerie with exotic plants, an aviary or a grotto with shells. The buitenplaats was often connected to a farm or a forest.

During the 19th century buitenplaatsen became outmoded, and often they were also too expensive to use exclusively in the summer. In some regions buitenplaatsen disappeared altogether, in other regions, such as Vecht and Kennemerland they still exist. Most were torn down to make way for housing developments, infrastructural changes (most of the Wijkermeer is under the North Sea Canal), and apartment buildings. Even in the case of Hofwijck, whose inhabitants were so notable that the house is a museum today, the place was nearly flattened in the early 20th century to make way for the railway, and today commuters between The Hague and Zoetermeer can get a good look at the old house. Often the street name or park name is a reminder of the old house (such as Groenendaal Park). Few are open to the public however, as many of them are still inhabited, though not usually year round.

== Notable buitenplaatsen still in existence ==
- Het Loo Palace in Apeldoorn
- Beeckestijn in Velsen-Zuid
- Elswout in Bloemendaal
- Huys Clingendael in Wassenaar
- Frankendael in the Watergraafsmeer
- Goudestein in Maarssen
- Groeneveld in Baarn
- Hofwijck in Voorburg
- Huis Honselaarsdijk in Honselersdijk
- Trompenburgh in 's-Graveland
- Hartekamp in Heemstede
- Berkenrode in Heemstede
- Iepenrode in Heemstede
- Huis te Manpad in Heemstede
- Villa Welgelegen in Haarlem
- Oud Poelgeest in Oegstgeest
- Keukenhof in Lisse
- Gunterstein in Breukelen
- Bolenstein in Maarssen
- Rustenhoven in Maartensdijk
- Sparrendaal in Driebergen
- Wester-Amstel in Amstelveen
- Landgoed Persijn in Maartensdijk

== See also ==
- Castle
- Cottage
- Country house
- Dacha
- Stately home
- Summer house
