= Bank van Lening, Haarlem =

Coordinates: 52°22′40.3″N 4°38′8.32″E

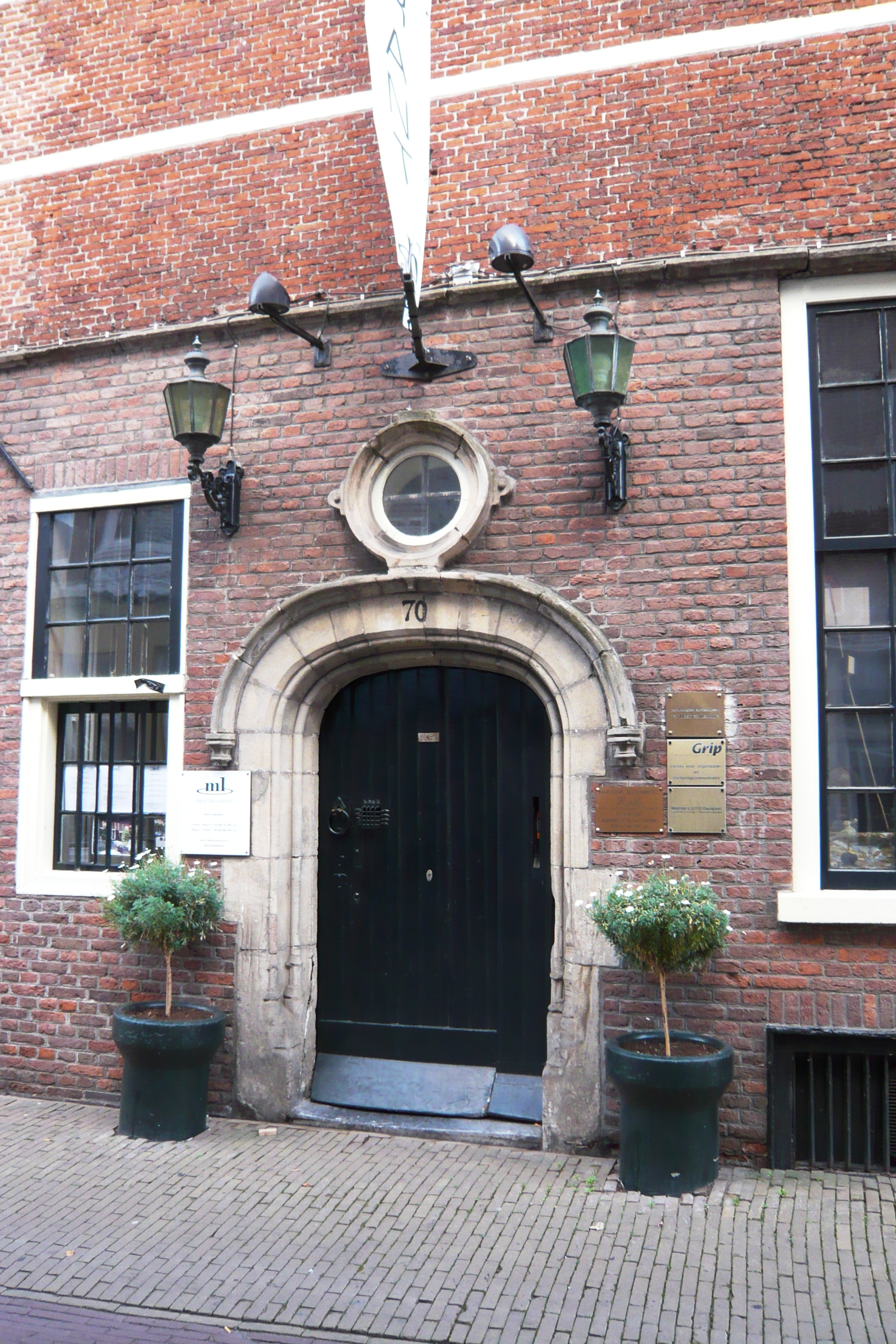
Entrance on the Kleine Houtstraat 70

The Haarlem Bank van Lening is a former city Bank van Lening that has been converted to a restaurant in Haarlem, the Netherlands.

== History of the bank ==
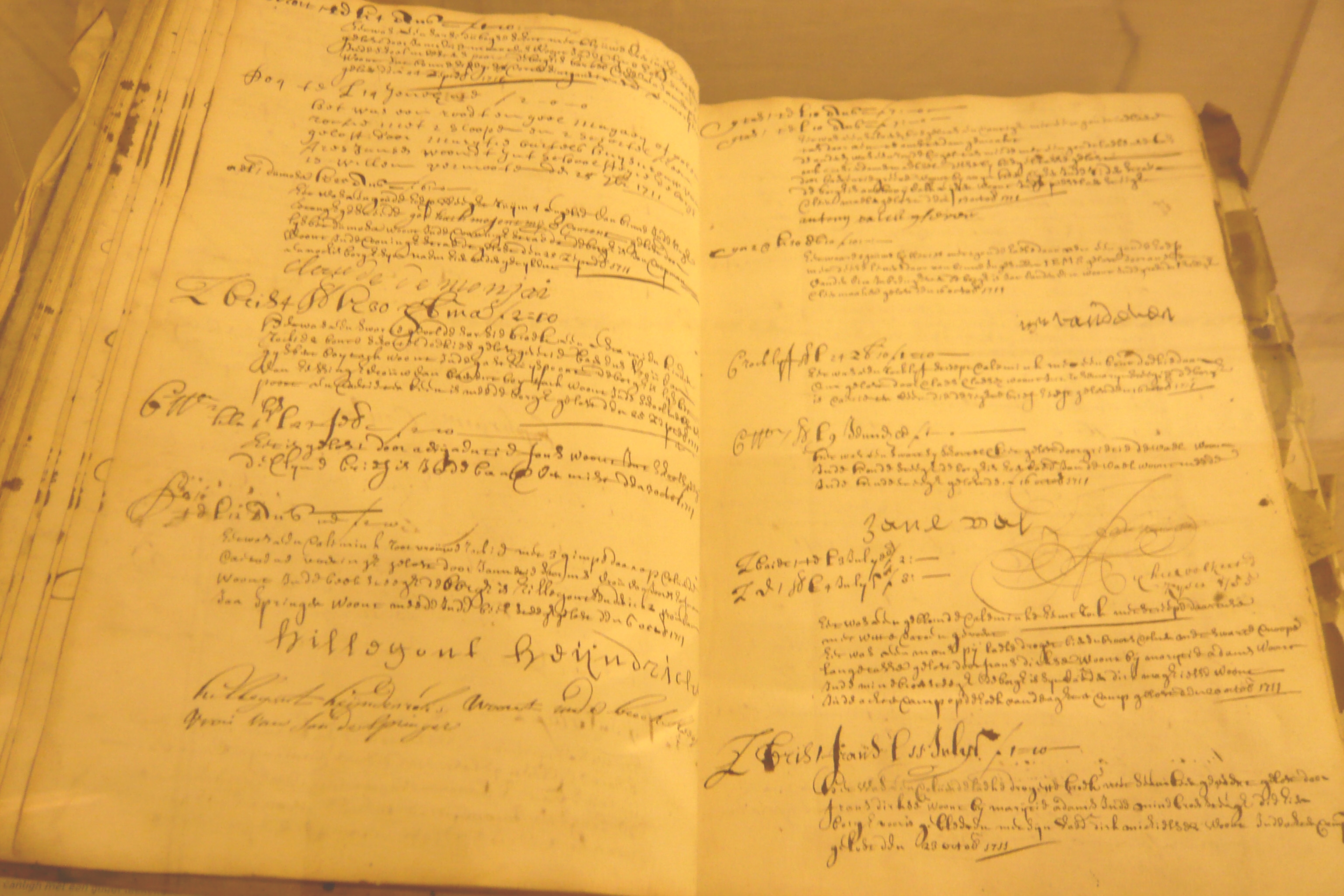
Book of loans from the year 1711, from the archives of the Haarlem Bank van Lening

Though Haarlem probably had a "Tafel van Leening" in the 13th century, the first mention of it in the Haarlem archives is in 1367 when Count Albrecht gave Hugen Aesuir permission to hold a lombard-tafel for four years in Haarlem. Two years later a 15-year grant was given to the Lombards in Haarlem with the same rules as Delft. In 1473 Jacques Fossuetz received permission to hold a Tafel van Leening for 10 years from Karel de Stoute. In 1543 Cesar Bouvet (Bovetus), marchant piémontais, received permission to hold a Tafel van Leening for 12 years from Karel V. The earliest location of the Bank van Lening is not precisely known, but was probably in or near the Lombard steeg, near the Janskerk.

In 1552 George Baillotes received permission to hold a Tafel van Leening in Haarlem from Karel V. He was ruined when his business was plundered during the Siege of Haarlem. In 1574 his patent was renewed by Philips II and he made a fresh start with family funds, though he continued to try to obtain reimbursement for damages suffered during the war. After the city became Protestant, Baillotes no longer paid Phillips II, but paid the Haarlem city treasurer yearly fees. In 1583 he renewed his patent for 14 years, which he sold in 1585 to Jean Laignier, a Tafel holder in Amsterdam, and to Sion Luz, a Tafel holder in Dordrecht. With the excuse of still desiring to be reimbursed for his losses during the siege, he was again granted another patent in 1589 for 10 years, but when he wished to renew it in 1599, the Haarlem council refused, since he asked a higher interest from lenders than the Laigner Tafel.

Jean Laigner was born in Lille and had two children, Maximiliaan and Sara. Maximiliaan married Catharina Goubau of Antwerp in 1594 and they lived on the Oude Gracht in Haarlem. Maximiliaan and Catharina's daughter Beatrix married the cloth merchant Boudewijn van Offenberg and they lived on the Spaarne. Sara married Laigner's partner Andries Mahieu in 1600 and they also lived on the Oude Gracht, in the oldest part of the Bank van Lening. After her death Andries married twice more and is reported living in the building on the Kleine Houtstraat, which he had extended to the Gortestraat in 1625. In 1626 Maximilian died and in 1629 his widow Catharina inherited his share. She transferred one of her two thirds share of the Tafel to her son Johan. From that moment there were three owners; Catharina, Johan, and Andries. Johan became lawyer of the Hof van Holland and married Constantia Tressel from the Hague, so his mother continued to represent him in the Haarlem business. His sister Janneke married Cornelis Ormea, a Lombard banker from Den Briel. Johan's daughter Catharina (named after his mother) would later take his place when he died.

These various family members ran the Bank van Lening until 1661, when they sold the premises as a going concern to the city council. Cornelis Ormea was the last "Tafel holder" and his accumulated wealth is evidenced by his building the "heerschapswoninge", or stately manor Iepenrode in 1652 as a summer home in Heemstede, 5 years before the Leidsevaart was officially opened as a canal. Ormea's son Scipio married the Lombard banker daughter Clara Johanna Criecx of Utrecht in 1668. Scipio inherited the entire Ormea fortune, but died in 1679, leaving his wife with three young children. According to his father's testament, his wife was not allowed to manage the fortune of Scipio's children and so the Haarlem city orphanage assigned Pieter Rijke to administer the children's inheritance in accordance with their grandfather's will. It is thanks to his meticulous bookkeeping that the family fortunes of the Ormea's were documented for 19 years. The grandson Justus Ormea later became mayor of Utrecht.

The Bank van Lening went on in the 18th century to become the scene of several financial scandals, paying its commissioners lucrative salaries. During the French occupation at the close of the 18th century, the management reverted completely to the city council and the business was reduced to a mostly administrative function. In the 1840s a new set of city controllers was appointed, and under Jacobus Fortgens a new system of bookkeeping was introduced that led very quickly to a large-scale fraud, probably made possible by the inexperience of the controllers. Unfortunately, Fortgens died before he could be tried for his crime. Despite this scandal, the bank flourished during the last half of the 19th century, and it wasn't until the 20th century that it started to be seen as somewhat behind the times.

=== List of Tafel holders ===
- 1367 Hugen Aesuir
- 1473 Jacques Fossuetz
- 1543–1552 Cesar Bouvet
- 1552–1585 George Baillotes
- 1585–1594 Jean Laigner and Sion Luz
- 1594–1600 Jean Laigner and Maximilian Laigner
- 1600–1629 Maximilian Laigner and Andries Mahieu
- 1629–1636 Johan Laigner, Catharina Goubau, and Andries Mahieu
- 1636–1642 Johan Laigner, Cornelis Ormea, and Mahieu heirs
- 1642–1659 Cornelis Ormea and Catherina Laigner

=== List of Cashiers ===
- 1659–1669 Davidt Gravius
- 1669–1703 Vincent van Vorsten
- 1703–1718 Lucas Claterbosch
- 1718–1743 Jan Passemier
- 1743–1756 Michiel Volkert de Keyser
- 1756–1795 Frank Engelbert Tersteeg

=== List of Cashier-bookkeepers ===
- 1796–1801 Pieter van Eeden
- 1802–1832 Lucas van Luyk
- 1832–1838 Willem Johan van Luyk
- 1838–1852 Jacobus Fortgens
- 1852–1892 Didericus Jacobus Ziegler

=== Directors ===
- 1892–1914 Gerrit Moerbeek
- 1914–1917 Waltherus Bakker
- 1917–1920 H.B. Weyland

=== Managers ===
- 1920–1927 Eduard van Pellecom
- 1927–1941 Adolphus Mattheus van Koningsbruggen

=== Directors of the Volkskredietbank ===
- 1941–1951 Adolphus Mattheus van Koningsbruggen
- 1951–1957 Marinus Johannes Dixon

== History of the building ==
The oldest part of the complex is the "former mayor's house" on the northern side with the gable. The foundation of a wooden house was built around 1380 on the south side of the Oude Gracht outside the city gate with an entrance on what is now the Kleine Houtstraat. Behind the house a stone "stins" was added around 1400. By 1530 the "mayor's house" was built by Geryt Steffensz a mayor of Haarlem, who married the owner of the corner house and then purchased the entire block of houses between the Gortestraat and the Oude Gracht from 1518. In his time, the house on the corner of the Oude Gracht and the Kleine Houtstraat also belonged to the complex. Two bricked-up doorways in the wall between the two properties was discovered during restoration activities in the 1970s. During the same period a wing was built with a cellar on the side of the Kleine Houtstraat. It is possible that parts of this construction were reused during construction activities in 1625 by Andries Mahieu. After Geryt Steffensz died in 1563, it was bought by Nicolaas van der Laan, also a mayor of Haarlem. His widow sold the complex in 1594 to her son-in-law, the mayor Maerten Willemsz Ruychaver. In 1617 the complex as a block was owned by Griete Claes Boelensdochter who sold it to Barent Roeloffs and Pieter Henricxsz. They sold part of it in the same year to the painter Frans Pietersz de Grebber and Cornelis Gerritsz Quaeckels, and later in the year they sold the Kleine Houtstraat wing to Maximiliaen Laignier for 2/3 ownership and his brother-in-law Andries Mahieu for 1/3. They made the renovations to the Kleine Houtstraat wing and moved the late gothic doorway a few meters southwards.

The complex can be seen on the corner of the Kleine Houtstraat on the map made by Thomas Thomasz of 1578. After the Lombard banking family sold the premises to the city of Haarlem in 1661, a small extension in the Gortestraat was added, giving the entire complex a U shape.

When the Volkskredietbank was discontinued in 1957 a period of neglect began. The building was thoroughly researched by the Archeologisch werkgroep Haarlem and restored in 1972–1976 and later reopened to house a restaurant (the "Peter Kuyper Taverne"), a historical center, and a bookshop, and a publisher, called Fibula-Van Dishoeck.

The current occupant is the Michelin starred ML.

== See also ==
- List of Michelin starred restaurants in the Netherlands
- List of banks in the Netherlands

== Sources and references ==
- De Bank van Lening te Haarlem, "een instelling van weldadigheid", by Dr. J.Th.R. van Greevenbroek, Fibula-Van Dishoeck, Haarlem, 1981 ISBN 9022837513
