= Stadsleenbank Delft =

Bank in Delft, Netherlands

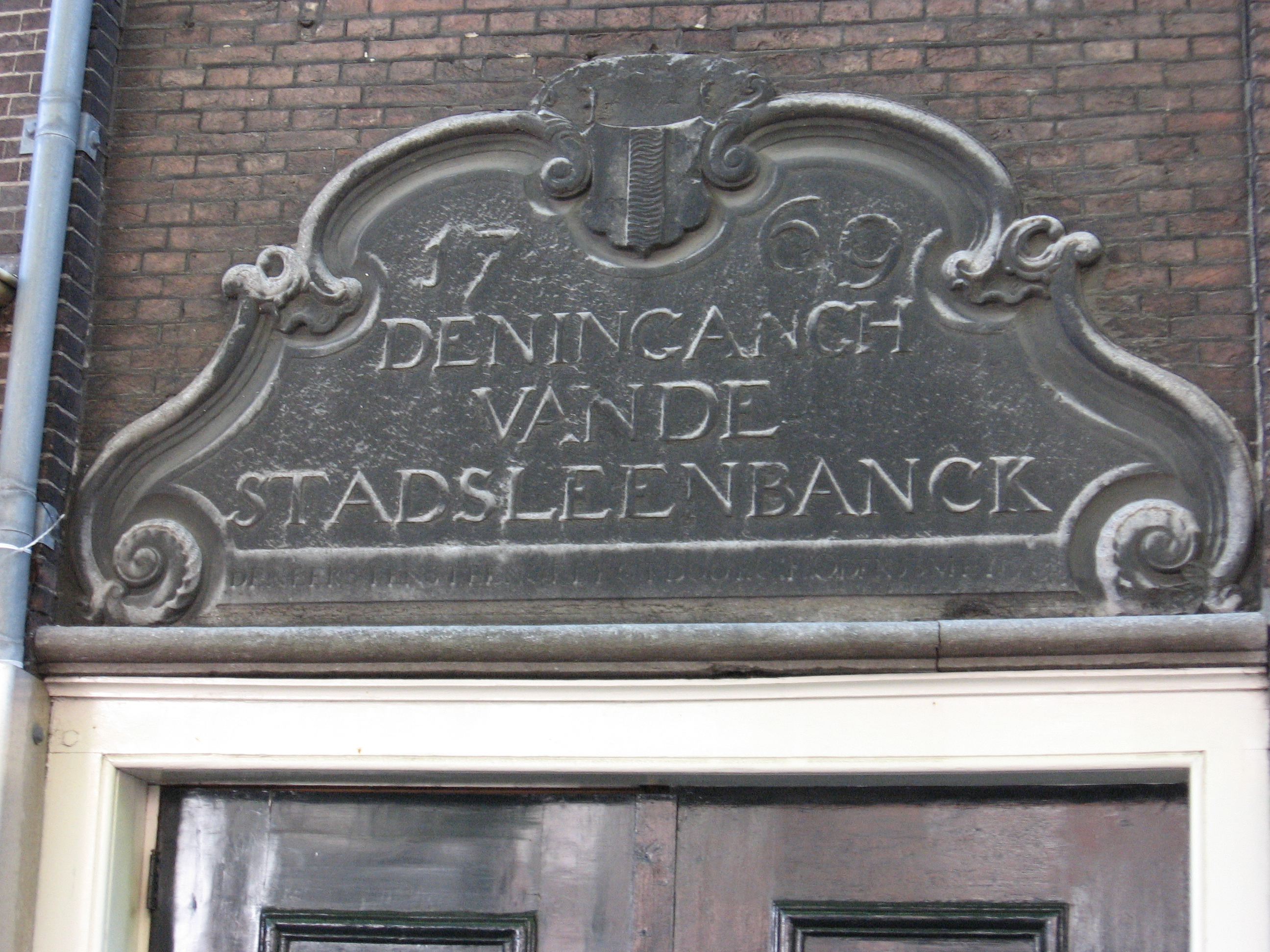
- Old gable stone with Delft coat of arms
- Interactive map of the Stadsleenbank Delft area

General information
- Type: bank
- Architectural style: neo-classical with roccoco doorway
- Location: Delft, Burgwal 45
- Coordinates: 52°0′40.65″N 4°21′42.3″E
- Completed: ca.1769

The Stadsleenbank Delft is a former Bank van Lening on the Burgwal 45 in Delft, and serves today as a pop music podium for concerts. The gable stone is inscribed '1769 Den Ingangh van de Stadsleenbanck', whereby "Den Ingangh" means entrance. Delft first received rights for a city lombard or "lommerd" bank in 1287 from Floris V. In 1367 similar rights "as in Delft" were granted to Haarlem by Albert I, Duke of Bavaria. The Lombard bankers sold out to the city council in 1676, and the bank functioned until 1923 when it was dissolved. The archives 1676–1923 were only partially retained and were inventoried in 1970 and are today in the collection of the city of Delft.

== See also ==
- List of banks in the Netherlands
