= Bert Bolle Barometer =

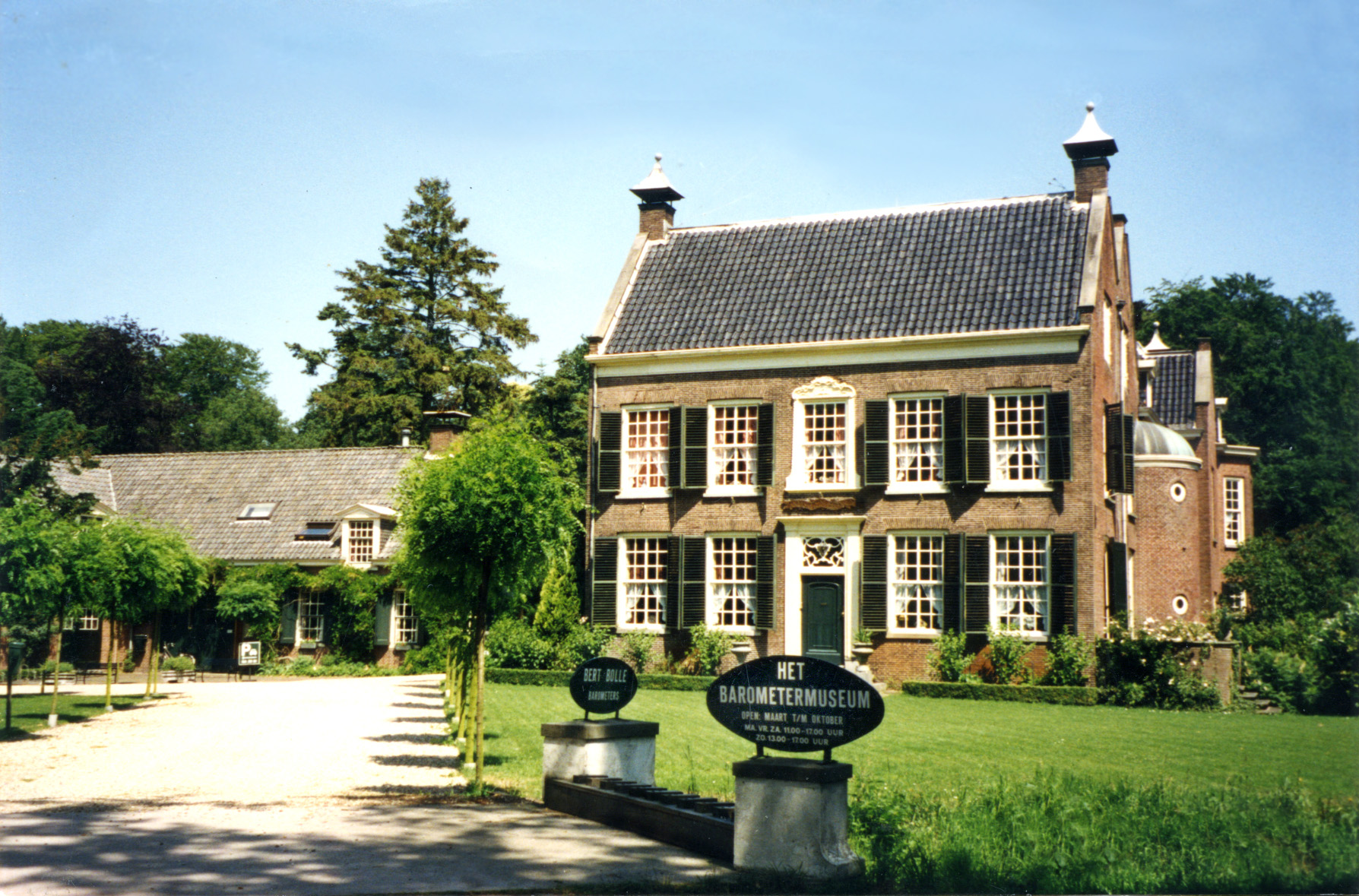
The 18th-century country house ‘Rustenhoven’ at Maartensdijk, formerly the Barometer Museum, about 1995

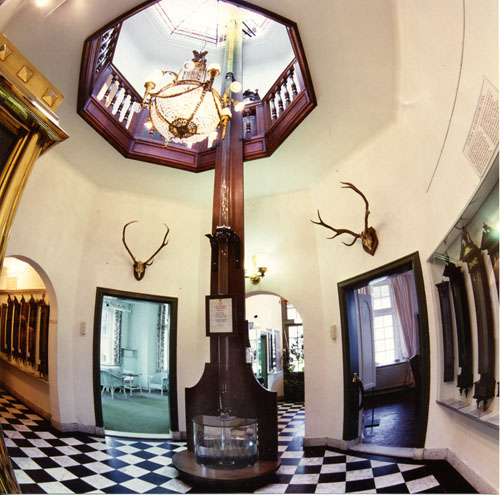
The water barometer in the central hall of ‘Rustenhoven’ at Maartensdijk, formerly the Barometer Museum, 1995

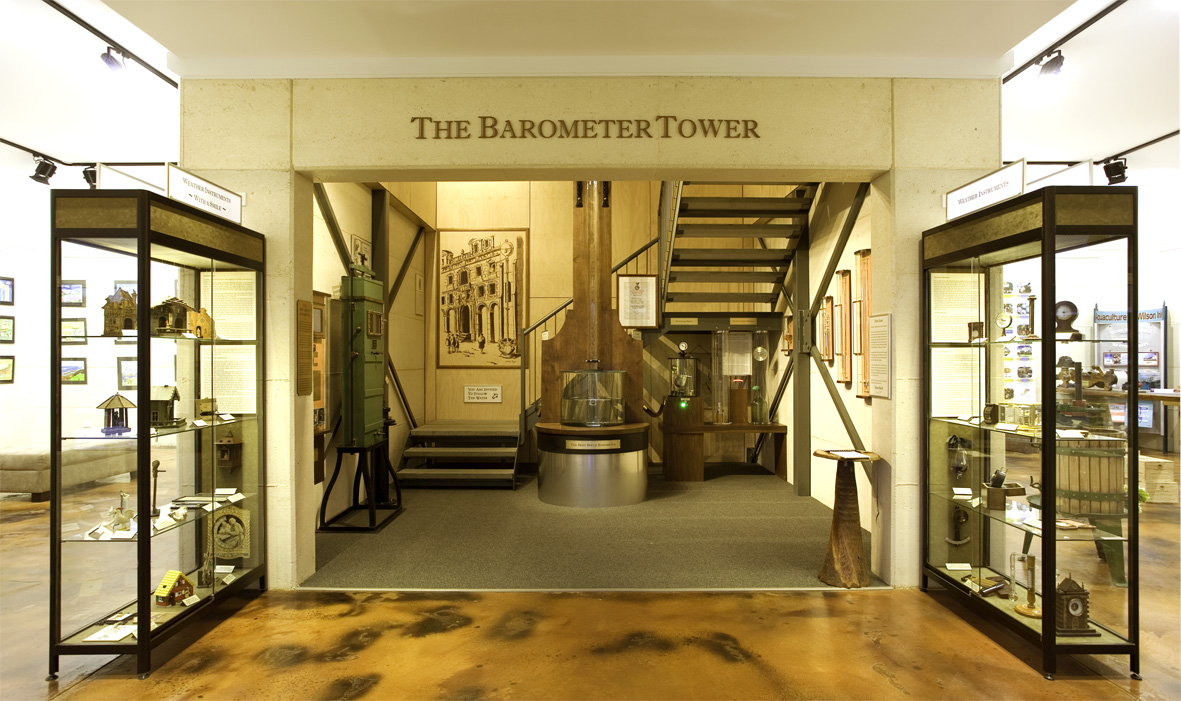
Entrance of the former Barometer Tower in the Denmark Visitor Centre, Western Australia, 2007

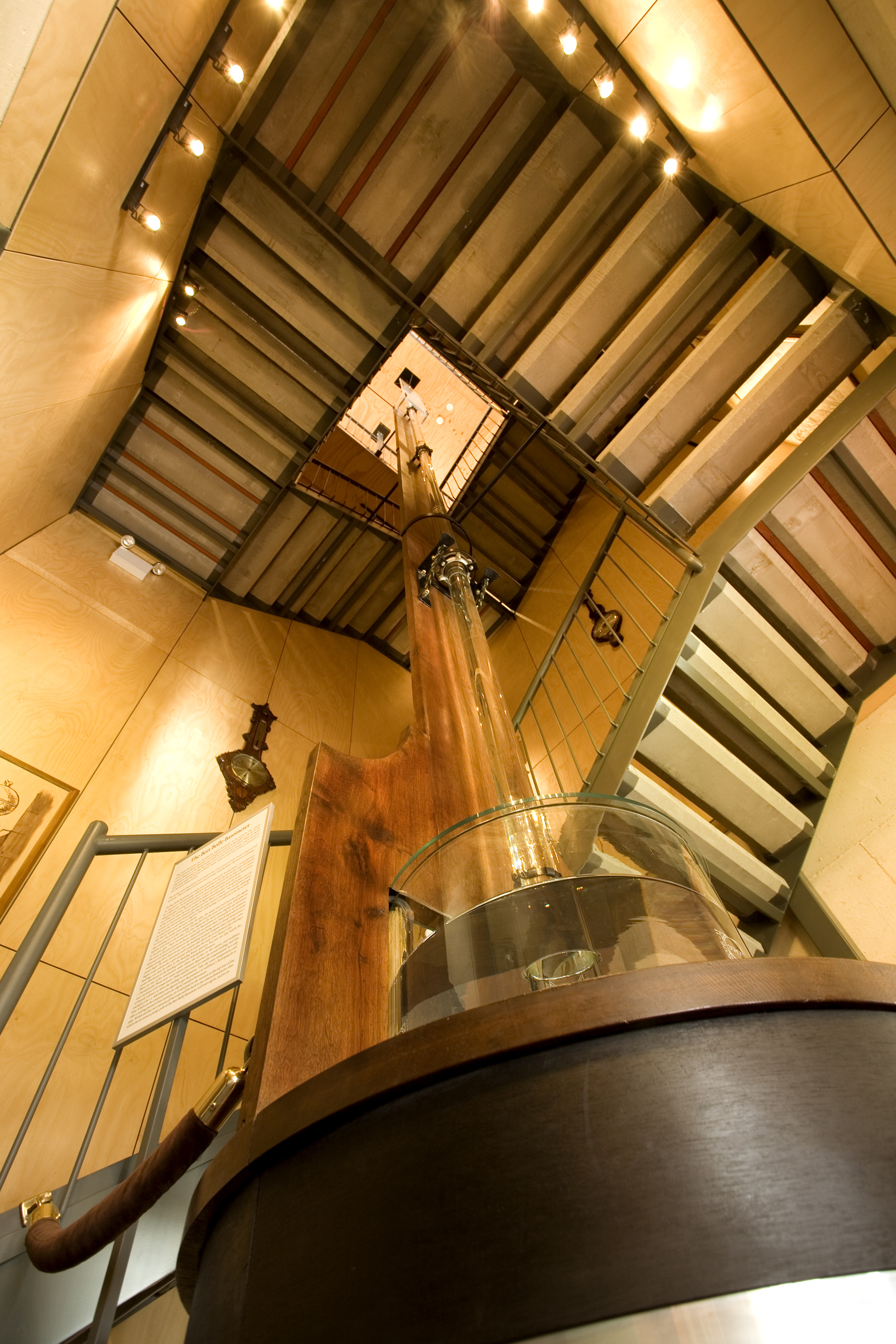
The Bert Bolle Barometer in the former Barometer Tower of the Denmark Visitor Centre, 2007

The Bert Bolle Barometer is a large water barometer. At over 12.5 metres tall, it is recognized as the largest barometer in the world by The International Guinness Book of Records. The instrument was created in 1985 in the Netherlands; in 2007 it was reinstalled in the new Visitor Centre of Denmark, Western Australia and was removed from there in 2011.

== History ==
=== The Netherlands ===
The Dutch writer and barometer specialist Bert Bolle (born 1947) designed and built the water barometer in 1985 as the focal point of the Barometer Museum, which he ran with his wife Ethne in the 18th-century country house ‘Rustenhoven’ at Maartensdijk in central Netherlands. In 1978 Bolle wrote a book titled Barometers, which was translated into German and English. In 1983 he wrote a scientific sequel to his first book and developed some modifications of the mercury barometer system.

In 1985 Bolle and his wife set up a barometer museum in their country house. Their aim was to create a collection based on loans of barometers from private collectors and museums in the Netherlands. To obtain these loans, a massive publicity campaign was undertaken. Bolle wanted something to make the museum's launch spectacular, an appliance that would be impressive and definitive which would serve as the centre point of the Barometer Museum. He decided to design and make a water barometer, paying homage to the 17th-century scientists, such as Evangelista Torricelli and Gasparo Berti, who produced some of the first and most crucial vacuum experiments, and created the first water barometers alongside their houses between 1640 and 1660. Bolle's old three-story country house had ample height, the highest point of which was the roof of the main hall: a leaded glass cupola. The apex of the hall was over 12 metres from the hall floor; a perfect environment for such an enormous instrument.

Bolle decided to make a construction of four borosilicate glass (e.g. Pyrex) pipes of 90 mm diameter. He fitted the pipes to a nine-metre-long solid oak plank, which was one metre wide at the base. For the top three metres of the barometer, a 25 mm thick polymethylmethacrylate (e.g. Perspex) sheet was used. The reservoir chamber was also made of borosilicate glass; with a diameter of 600 mm the capacity of this reservoir was enough to hold 150 litres of water, which was necessary to make the barometer work properly. The first successful test runs took place in November and December 1985.

Bolle designed the top end of the water barometer to be connected to a rotary vane pump, which was governed by timer relays. At ten-minute intervals, the pump evacuated the air from the glass pipe, causing the 12-metre-tall instrument to fill with 55 litres of water within one minute. Visitors were invited to climb the stairs and follow the water to the top, where it started to boil spontaneously (see below). The huge register plate had two scales: centimeters of water and millibar. Water vapour pressure depresses the reading of water barometers, and the magnitude of this error increases with temperature. Thus, a rule of thumb was provided to make a correction for temperature. After a reading period of five minutes, air was admitted to the top area of the pipe. Within a couple of minutes all the water would return to the cistern downstairs, after which the ten-minute pump cycle would start again. Visitors were able to watch a real living instrument the whole day.

The instrument proved to be a massive drawcard and appeared several times in the media during the subsequent twelve-year period during which Bolle's Barometer Museum operated. In 1998 the museum was closed down.

=== Australia ===
Bolle and his wife migrated to Australia in 1999, but the maker didn’t want to part with his creation, so the barometer was brought with them to Australia, where Bolle donated it to the community of Denmark, a small town in Western Australia. The town didn’t have a building high enough to house the enormous instrument, but in 2004 plans were adopted for a new multi-function Visitors Centre, the centre part of which would be The Barometer Tower, built especially for the instrument.

The Shire of Denmark made the water barometer a local monument, named The Bert Bolle Barometer. Furthermore, the shire announced that the tower would be dedicated to the water barometer and the history of weather instruments in general and access would be free of charge. In 2007 the Denmark Visitor Centre was finished. It was officially opened on 10 August by the Minister for Tourism in Western Australia Mrs Sheila McHale.

In the Barometer Tower the Bert Bolle Barometer stood on a stainless steel pedestal. The vacuum pump cycle became shorter than it was in the Netherlands; reduced to six minutes from the previous ten. The timer relays had been replaced by a PLC, which now governs a refined and modernized vacuum system with 11 solenoid valves. Operating eight hours per day, seven days a week, the water barometer was constantly ‘on the move’.

Visitors could walk up the stairs and take a reading in the Reading Room atop the Tower. At the moment when the water reached its highest possible point in the glass pipe, visitors could witness an interesting physical phenomenon for about a minute. The air pressure above the water had lowered dramatically. Therefore, the evaporation of the water happened so vigorously that the water started to boil spontaneously, although its temperature rarely exceeded 20 °C. This ‘cold boiling’ is contributed to by air bubbles that were formed in the water column. As soon as the pump was disconnected, the evacuating of the pipe stopped and the water level became calm again, enabling people to take a reading. During the time the water level was calm, there was still some turbulence at the surface due to air bubbles rising to the top of the apparatus. Although water vapour pressure depressed the barometers pressure reading, visitors were told how to correct for this error and thus calculate the real air pressure, and could then compare it with the accurate Vaisala digital standard barometer in the Tower. After a reading period of two minutes, air was gradually admitted to the vacuum in the top area of the pipe. Within another two minutes all the water had returned to the reservoir downstairs, after which the six-minute pump cycle of the Bert Bolle Barometer repeated.

Climbing the stairs in the tower, a selection of antique barometers from Europe was displayed, along with five murals depicting the oldest barometer experiments dating from the 17th century. In the Reading Room, tribute was paid to the pioneers of the barometer, the Italian scientists Galileo Galilei and Evangelista Torricelli. On the ground floor, Bolle had created several interesting physical experiments such as the Atmosphere Simulator, in which artificial highs and lows were created. There was also a bell jar showing interesting vacuum experiments with sound and air.

=== Record ===
Australia is known as a country of bizarre records for the sake of tourism, like the Big Banana or the Giant Ram. The size of the water barometer in Denmark was, however, a result of necessity, rather than a tourist gimmick. In order to function properly, a water barometer has to be quite large, with greater height producing greater accuracy. The Bert Bolle Barometer is thus a very accurate and genuine working instrument, as well as an impressive monument.

=== Recognition ===
In April 2008 the Bert Bolle Barometer was listed among the Top Hundred Australian ‘must see’ topics. Australian Traveller magazine revealed a list of 100 Things You Can Only Do In Australia. During its first year of its existence, the Denmark Visitor Centre recorded its 100,000th visitor.

=== 25th anniversary ===
In December 2010 the 25th anniversary of the barometer was celebrated. Bolle had written a booklet titled "Weird and Wonderful Weather Predictors", of which 1,000 copies were printed and given to visitors in December as a present.

=== The loss of the barometer ===
Shortly after the celebration of the 25th anniversary of the Bert Bolle Barometer the Denmark Visitor Centre lost its world attraction. Differences of opinion with the Board of Denmark Tourism Incorporated and the management of the Denmark Visitor Centre about promoting and signposting the water barometer and the Barometer Tower at the Denmark Visitor Centre lay at the bottom of an ongoing conflict. Eventually Bolle and his wife asked Denmark Council for the barometer to be given back to them, which was unanimously approved on 21 December 2010. The Barometer Tower was dismantled mid February 2011.

=== New location ===
Negotiations with a possible future owner of the barometer are in an advanced phase, albeit the location will not be in Denmark anymore. The plan is to house the water barometer in a 6x6 m brick tower with a small meteorological museum attached.

== Copy ==
The Otto von Guericke Museum in Magdeburg in Germany erected a copy of the water barometer in 1995, after Bolle had been asked for his expertise. The barometer was situated in the centre of a spiral staircase. No attempt was made to outdo Bolle’s record. A narrower pipe was used, made of polycarbonate and the instrument was named the ‘Bert Bolle Wasserbarometer’ after the Dutch record holder.

== Labour-intensive ==
Maintenance is an ongoing concern for the barometer, with one of the major issues being water vapour, which constantly enters the pump and could easily emulsify with the pump oil. Special provisions are made to prevent this. Since water vapour is extracted continuously, the water level in the reservoir needs to be topped up every day. In addition, the abundance of sunshine in the barometer's environment, combined with the presence of algae in the rainwater that is employed, leads to a risk of algae growing within the water pipe. To address this, the owners have employed chlorine to kill the algae, but the evaporation of the chlorine had to be specifically catered for. Wear and tear also places considerable strain on the vacuum system's vulnerable pump, its 11 solenoid valves and its relays. Finally, the barometer needs to be exclusively filled with pure rainwater, as tap water contains many minerals which may be detrimental to the barometer.

Because the water barometer has always been treated with great care, the instrument still looks almost new despite its age. A well-considered choice of durable materials like oak and borosilicate glass certainly play an important role in its continued longevity. Other attempts to copy the instrument have floundered due to the use of inferior material, a lack of constant supervision, pollution of the pipe system and other factors reducing durability.
