= Landgoed Persijn =

Estate in the Netherlands

Coordinates: 52.1503°N 5.1581°E

Landgoed Persijn (Persijn Estate) in Maartensdijk is a buitenplaats with a white villa just west of the A27 motorway.

The estate dates from 1781 and was originally designed as an early English landscape garden. In the 19th century it was renewed in the late landscape style with two tree-lined avenues and the introduction of exotic plants.

The pedagogy center OPL has established her headquarters here in 1982 and also houses three living units for maladjusted youth.

The park design, villa and the gardener's house are Rijksmonuments.
