= Bank van Lening =

A Bank van Lening is a Dutch term for an early type of bank that functioned similarly to a Mount of Piety (Dutch: Berg van Barmhartigheid). It was usually called the "lommerd".

Examples were:

- Stadsbank van Lening, Amsterdam
- Bank van Lening, Haarlem
- Stadsleenbank Delft
