= Jan ten Compe =

Dutch painter

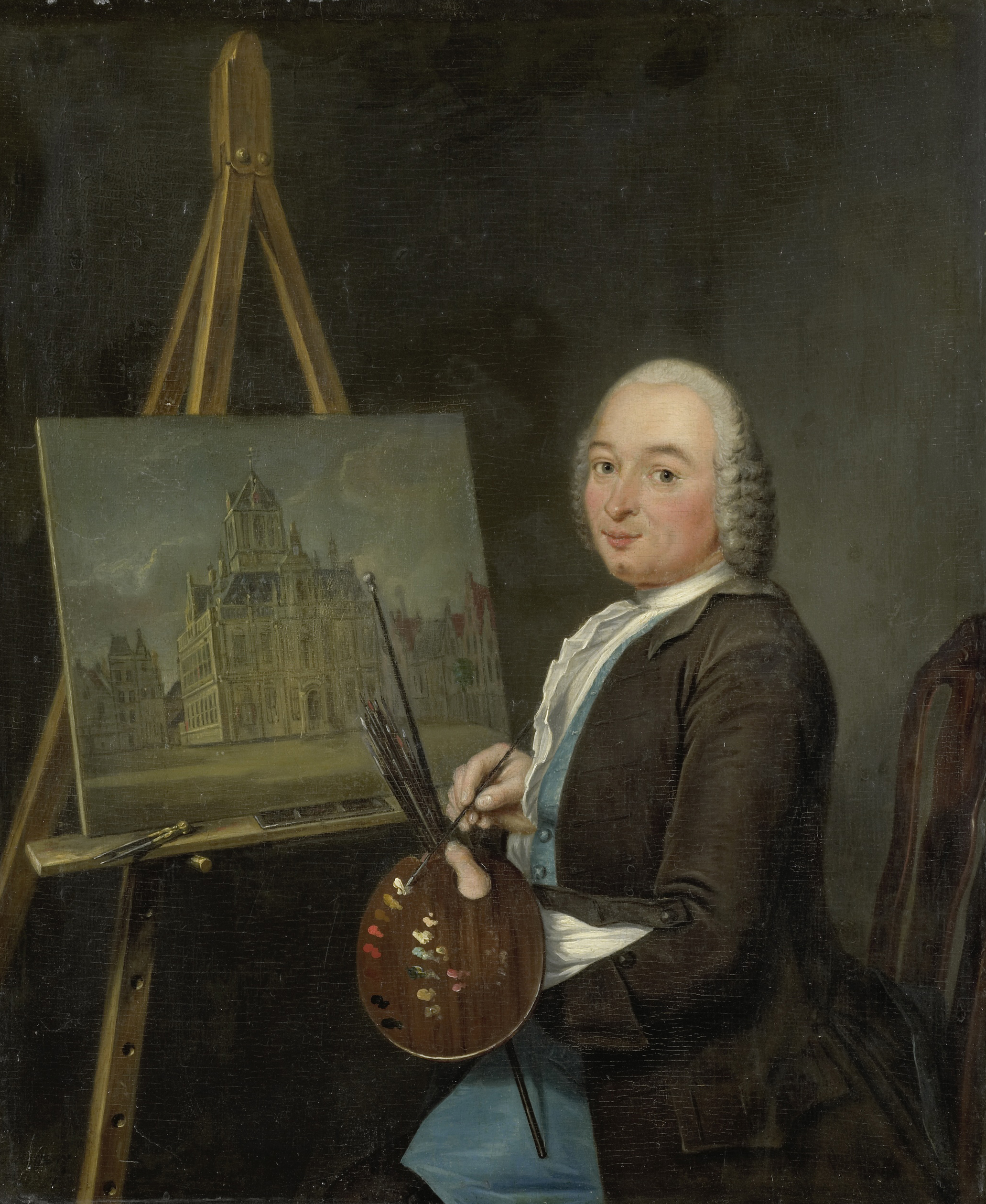
Portrait of Jan ten Compe by Tibout Regters (1751)

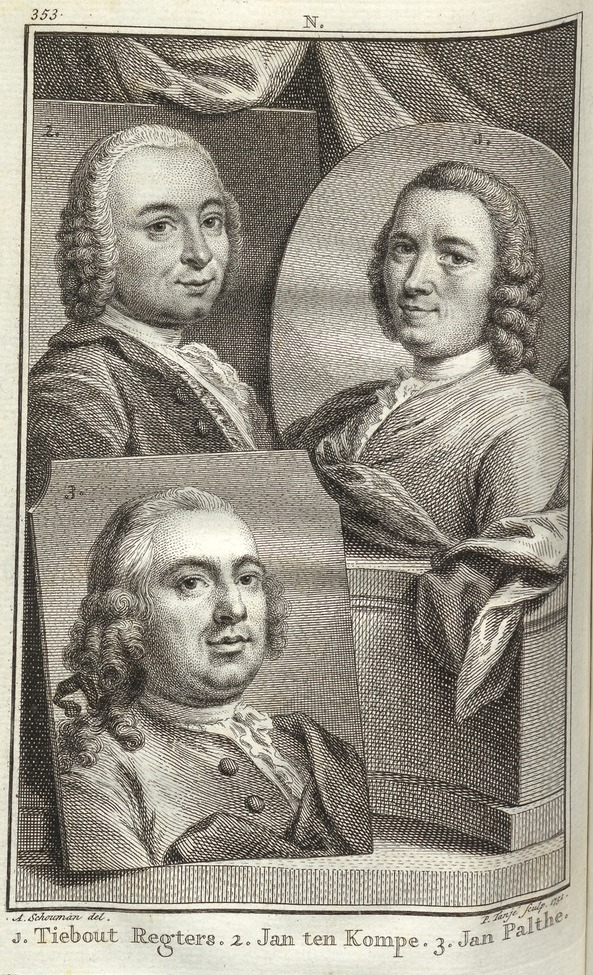
Jan ten Compe upper left in Jan van Gool's Nieuw Schouburg

Jan ten Compe (1713–1761) was an 18th-century landscape painter from the Dutch Republic.

== Biography ==
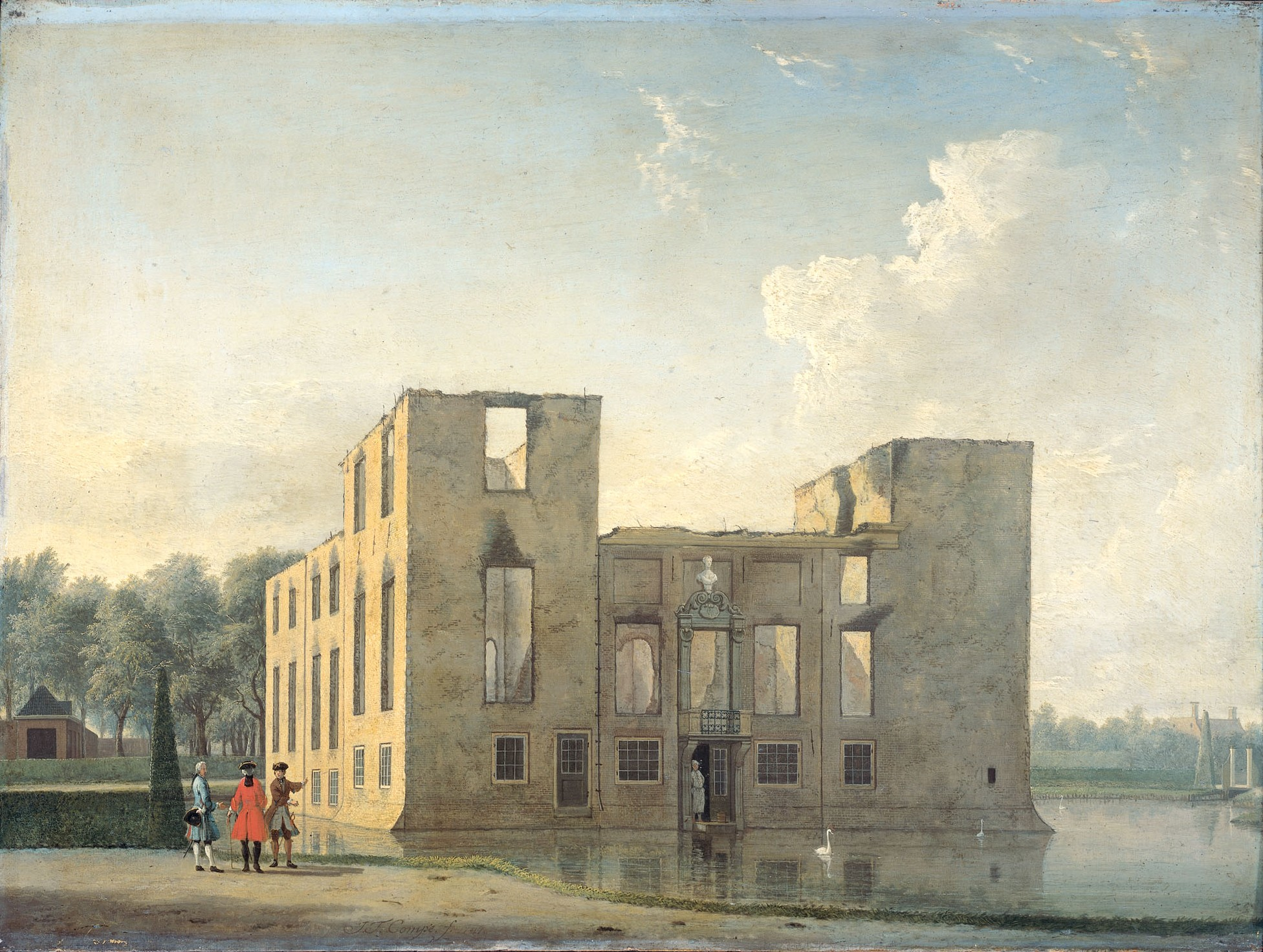
Rear View of Berckenrode Castle in Heemstede after the Fire, depicting the rebuilt Berkenrode Castle after the fire of 1747

He was born and died in Amsterdam. According to his biographer Jan van Gool, he was a follower of Jan van der Heyden and Gerrit Berckheyde. He works were in demand by wealthy patrons such as Mayor Rendorp of Amsterdam and Mr. De Groot of the Hague, where Van Gool saw his paintings of prominent buildings and landmarks of Rotterdam, Delft, the Hague, Leiden, Haarlem, and Amsterdam.

According to the RKD he was the pupil of Dirck Dalens III and the teacher of Geerit Toorenburgh. He was also known as Jan ten Kompe or I.T. Conyn.
