= Restaurant ML =

Coordinates: 52°22′39.75″N 4°38′8.4″E

ML
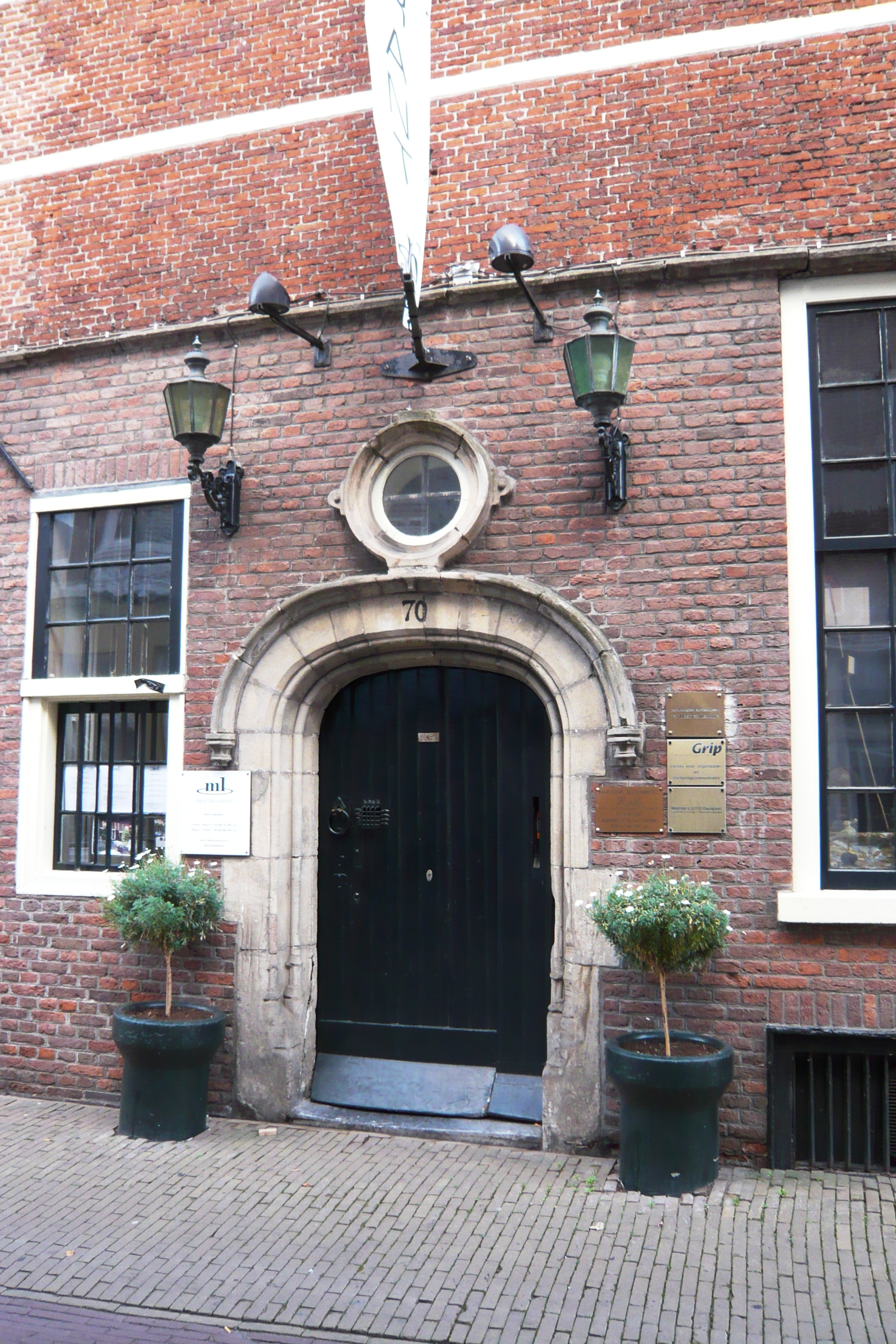
- The entrance of the restaurant
- Interactive map of ML

Restaurant information
- Established: 2008
- Head chef: Mark Gratama
- Food type: French, International
- Rating: Michelin Guide
- Location: Kleine Houtstraat 70, Haarlem, 2011 DR, Netherlands
- Seating capacity: 50
- Website: Official website

Restaurant ML is a restaurant located in Haarlem, in the Netherlands. It is a fine dining restaurant that was awarded one Michelin star in the period 2011–present.

Gault Millau awarded the restaurant 13 out of 20 points.

Head chef of Restaurant ML is Mark Gratama.

The restaurant is located in the former Bank van Lening. This building is a Rijksmonument. Formerly, the restaurant was located on Lange Veerstraat 4.

== See also ==
- List of Michelin starred restaurants in the Netherlands
