= Iepenrode =

Villa in the Netherlands

Coordinates: 52°20′51″N 4°36′23″E

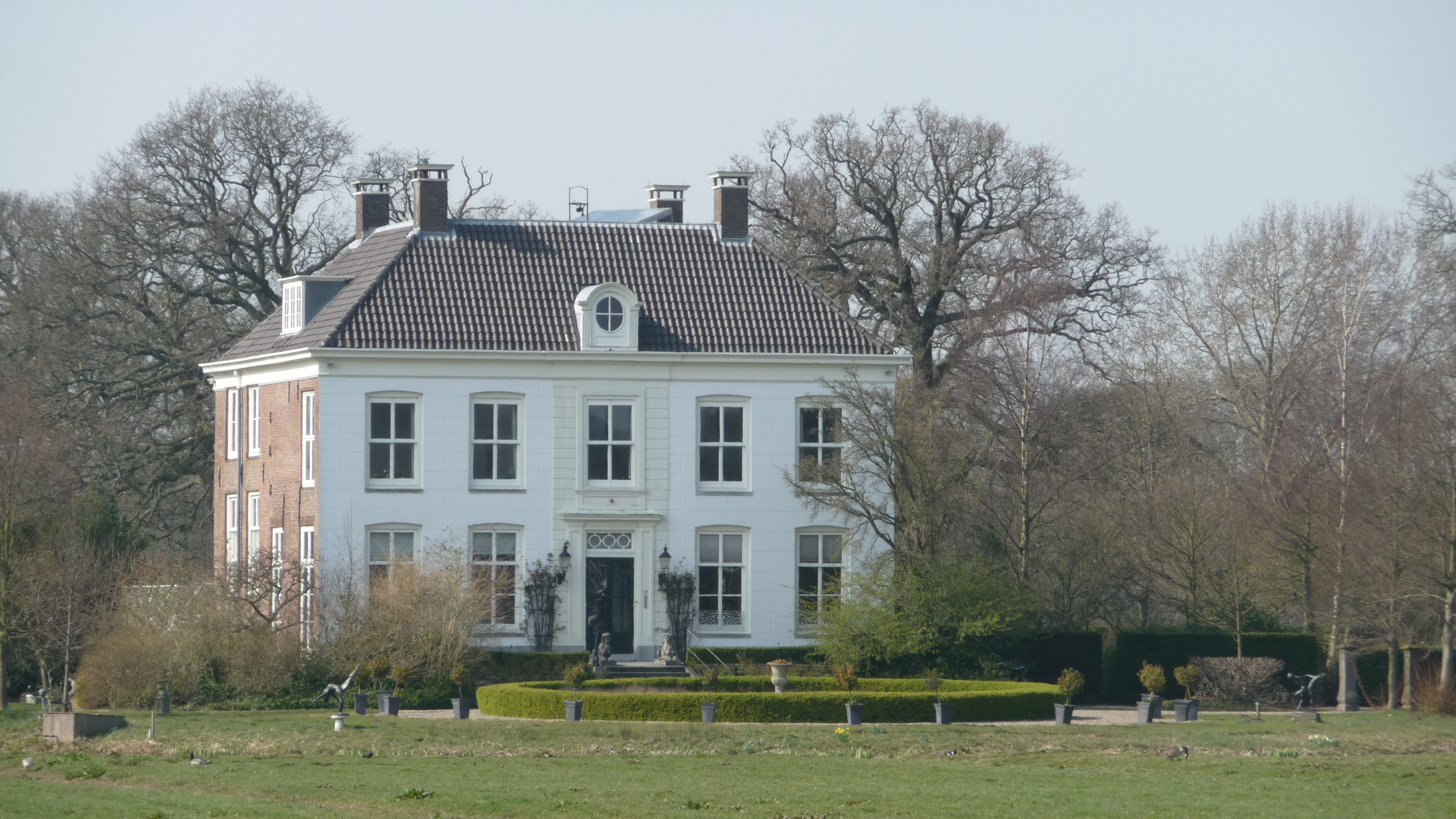
Ipenrode on the Herenweg, the road from Haarlem to Leiden that leads along 17th and 18th century summer homes

Iepenrode, or Ipenrode, is the name of a villa in Heemstede, the Netherlands, between the Leidsevaart and Herenweg. It is located north of Huis te Manpad and south of Berkenrode. It was once the summer home of various mayors (burgemeesters) of Haarlem and is currently privately owned.

== History ==
In the Middle Ages the property was owned by the wealthy Van Berkenrode family, whose name is still associated with the neighboring property. There were two buildings called "Voorkoekoek" and "Achterkoekoek", that were split when the Leidsevaart was dug. In 1608 the remaining eastern half was called "Voorkoekoek". In 1652 the property came into the hands of Cornelis Ormea, a "Lombard Banker", who built a "heerschapswoninge", or stately manor, on what was later to be the Leiden-Haarlem pull-canal. Ormea, with his partner Jean Laigner, ran the Bank van Lening in the Kleine Houtstraat in Haarlem from 1625 to 1661, when they sold the premises as a going concern to the city council.

On 14 September 1716, the Haarlem mayor Abraham van Guldewagen bought the remaining eastern half that was called "Voorkoekoek" for ƒ 20.900,- at public auction in Amsterdam. An argument ensued with the treasurer of Heemstede, Thamis de Jongh, over the "pondgeld" to be paid, which has survived in the archives of the Heerlijkheid Heemstede.

The current house was built by Francois Aernout Druyvestein in 1733. The house passed into the hands of the Heemstede family Geelvinck, until it was bought by the Amsterdam banker Abraham Dedel, who designed laid a garden in the French style, adding property on the south side that had formerly belonged to Leyduin. Since the trekvaart had been dug in 1657, the Leyduin property was split. After Dedel died the complex came into the hands of a board member of the West-Indies colony, mr. Jan van de Poll (1759-1822) and his wife Anna Catharina Valckenier (1766-1842), who inherited it after he died.

It burned on 26 May 1956 and was restored in July 1957, according to a plaque near the front door.
