= Berkenrode =

Former Dutch municipality, now part of Heemstede

Coordinates: 52°21′N 4°37′E

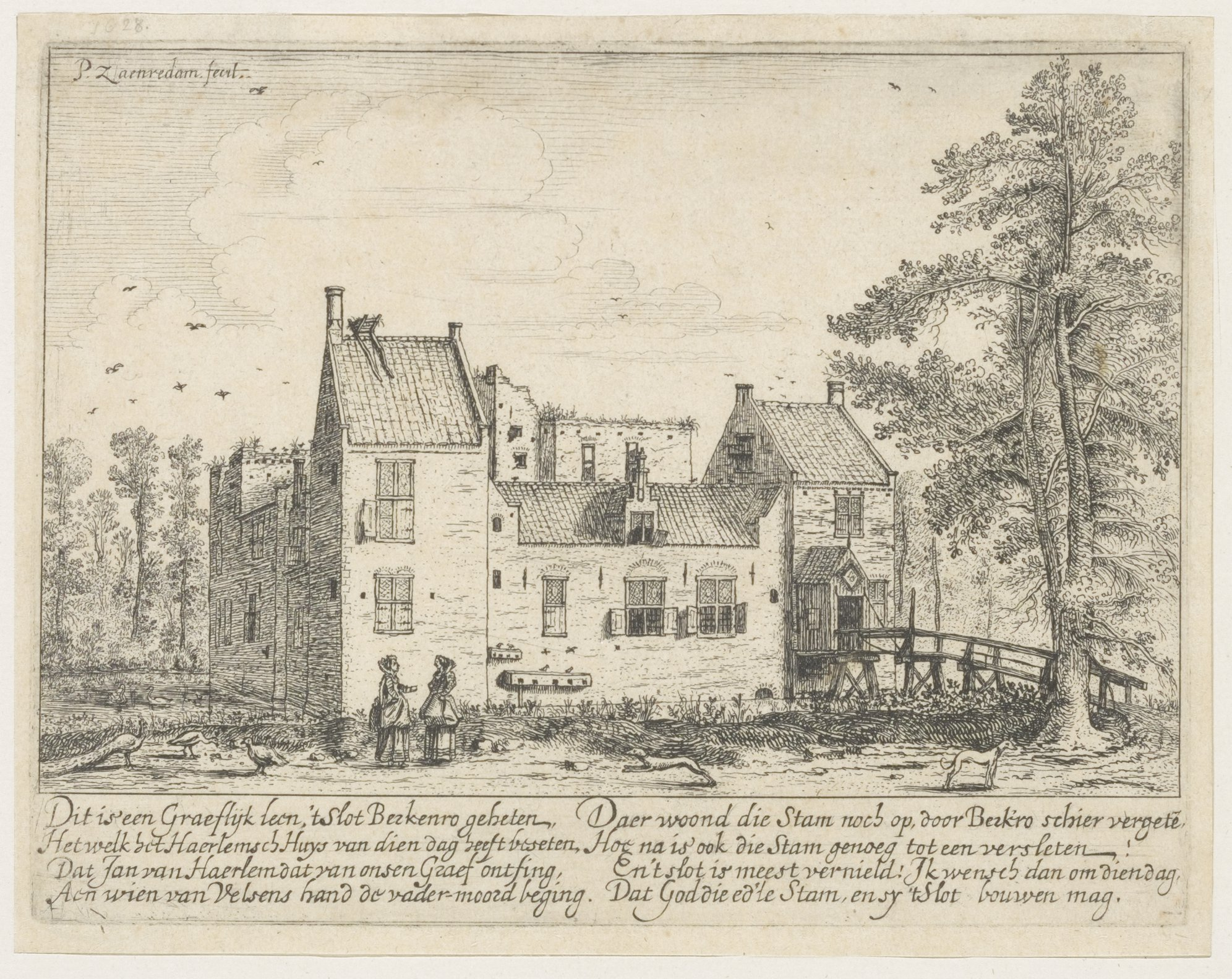
Historical engraving of the pre-1572 castle by Pieter Saenredam, printed in Samuel Ampzing's Praise of Haarlem, 1628.

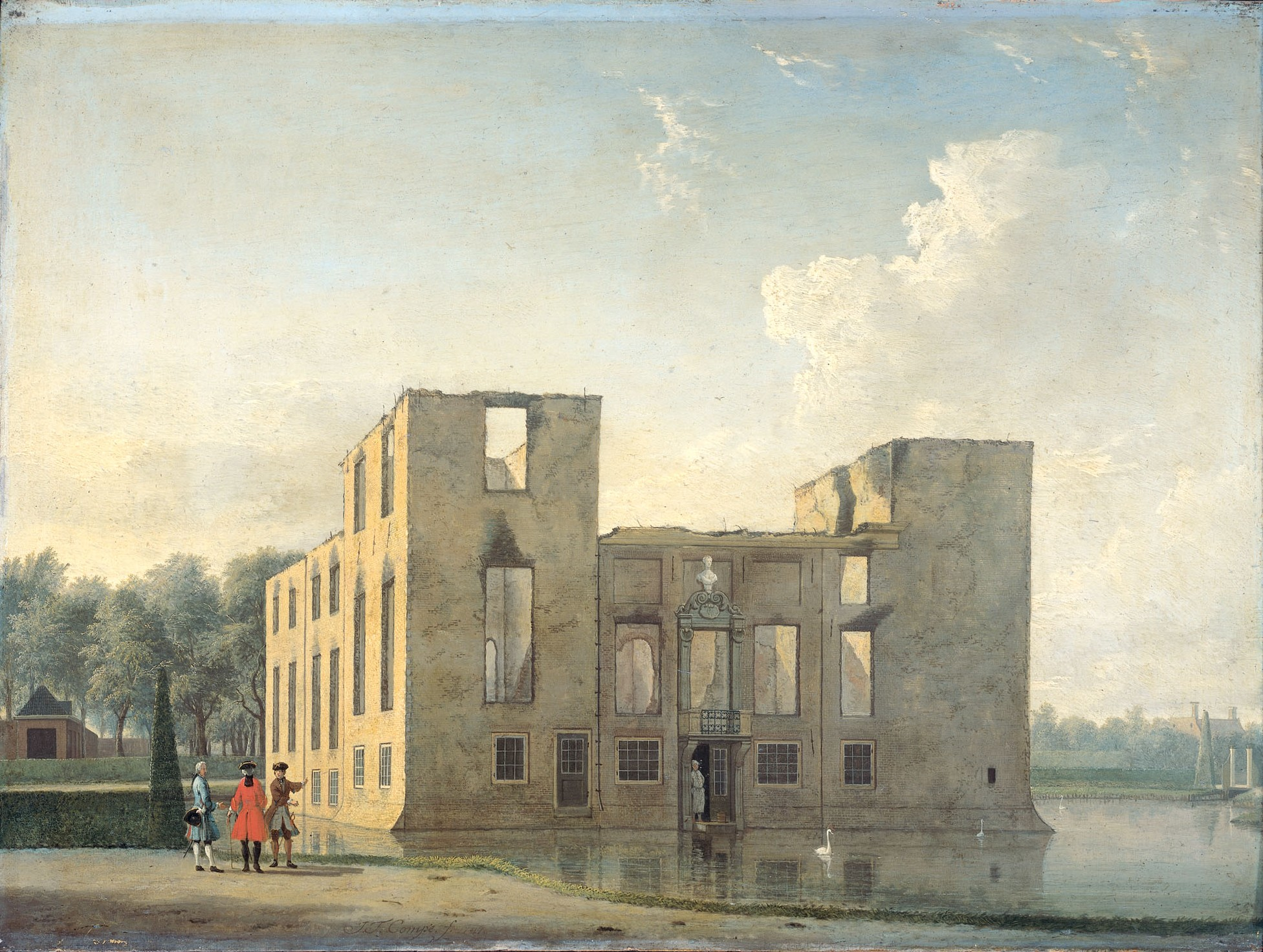
The rebuilt Berkenrode after the fire in 1747, by Jan ten Compe.

Berkenrode, or Berckenroode is a former 'Heerlijkheid' in the Dutch province of North Holland, situated on the southwest side of Haarlem on the leidsevaart, north of Iepenrode and west of Heemstede. The original castle Berkenrode in the center of the moat was burned by the Spanish during the siege of Haarlem in 1572. The castle was rebuilt and despite suffering another fire in 1747 the settlement continued to function as a separate municipality with its own chapel up to 1857, when the town was annexed by Heemstede. The town archives are now kept at the North Holland Archives in Haarlem.

== History ==
Berckenrode is first mentioned in 1284, though first mention of a castle there by the same name is found much later in 1466. This is because the family Van Berkenrode preferred to live on the Grote Markt in Haarlem. After the castle was rebuilt in 1573, the chapel was used as a Catholic church and functioned in that capacity for the Catholics of Berkenrode and Heemstede until the last heer van Berkenrode died in 1690. The new Lord of Berkenrode, Benjamin Pouille, granted the 500 Catholics a small portion of land to build a schuilkerk, and they continued to bury their dead in the Protestant church of Heemstede.

Pouille was a member of the Amsterdam council and in 1694 the Vereenigde Oost-Indische Compagnie named a ship after Berkenrode. Pouille never lived there as he had bought it for the title and when he was succeeded in the Amsterdam council by Mattheus Lestevenon, he sold the title to him. The castle burned from neglect in 1747. Lestevenon, who called himself "heer van Berkenrode", had the castle rebuilt and in 1748 it was the scene of a grand fireworks display to celebrate the young prince Willem V, who at the age of one month, was travelling on his first "state visit" with his mother, the English-born Anne, Princess Royal and Princess of Orange on April 11, 1748. The fireworks were notable enough to be recorded in the diary of Jacob Bicker-Raye, and six years later in the popular journal Europische Mercurius. However, the rebuilt house was demolished in 1797 by Lestevenon's successor as owner, Jan Pieter van Wickevoort Crommelin.

A small group of stately houses are built on the former grounds of the 'Heerlijkheid van Berkenrode'. The moat of the original castle is now parkland between the Leidsevaart and the current building called Berkenrode on the Heren weg. On the edge of the park is a former bathhouse (in use as a horse stall) for an oval swimming pool that was part of the original moat.

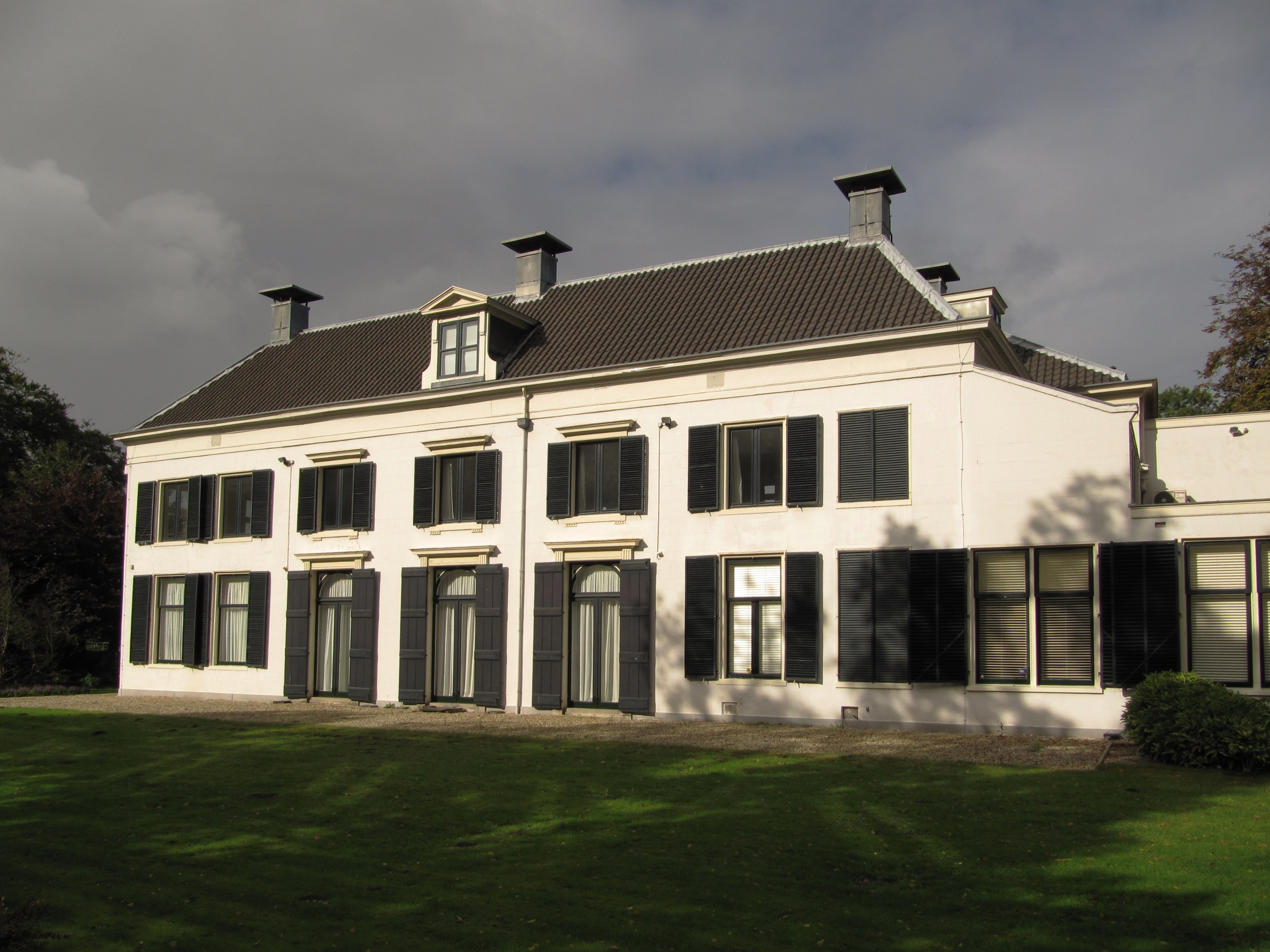
Berkenrode, situated east of the old castle on the Heren weg.

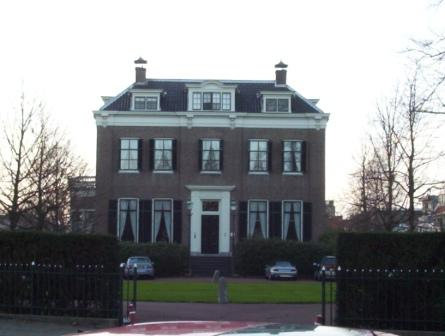
Oud Berkenrode (Westerduin), situated north of the old castle on the Heren weg.

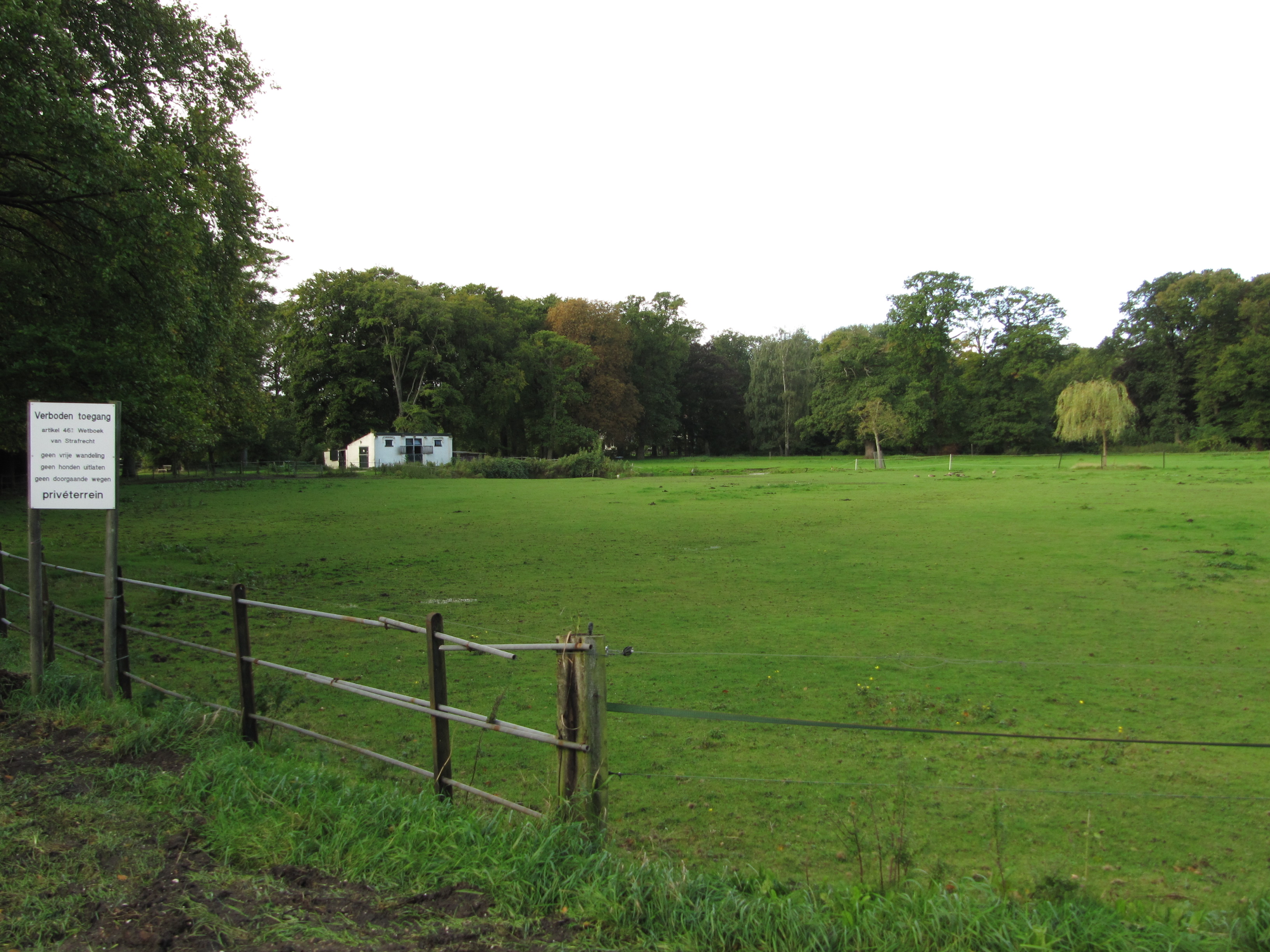
Berkenrode park, original location of the castle and moat

Coat of Arms

Berkenrode is a Dutch ship name. On 14 February 1740 King Desinganadu and Stein van Gollenesse had a meeting along with Berkenrode board of Dutch ship. This evidence can be seen in "The Kulasekhara Perumals of Travancore" book written by Mark De Lannoy.
