= Maartensdijk =

- Village
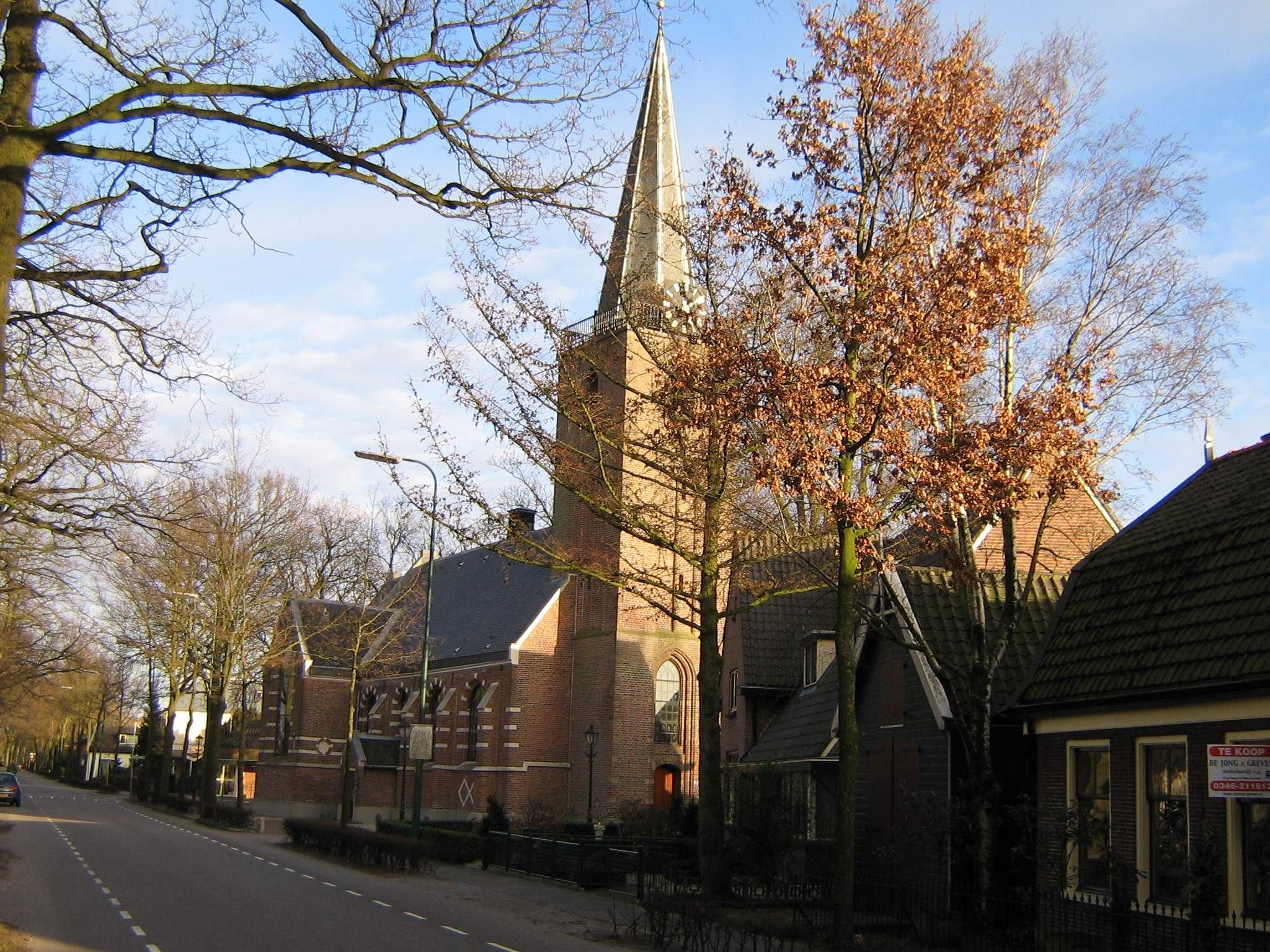
- Dutch Reformed church in Maartensdijk

- Location in the Netherlands Maartensdijk (Netherlands)
- Coordinates: 52°9′N 5°11′E
- Country: Netherlands
- Province: Utrecht
- Municipality: De Bilt

Area
  - Total: 7.25 km^{2} (2.80 sq mi)
- Elevation: 2 m (6.6 ft)

Population (2024)
  - Total: 4,886
  - Density: 674/km^{2} (1,750/sq mi)
- Time zone: UTC+1 (CET)
  - Summer (DST): UTC+2 (CEST)
- Postal code: 3738
- Dialing code: 0346

Maartensdijk, formerly Oostveen, is a village in the Dutch province of Utrecht. It is a part of the municipality of De Bilt, and lies about 4 km north of Bilthoven.

== History ==
Maartensdijk was a separate municipality until 2001, when it merged with De Bilt.

Until 1812, Maartensdijk was called Oostveen, meaning "east fen". The conversion of fen or wetland area into agricultural land was initiated by Bishop Godebald of Utrecht (1114–1127) when the Kromme Rijn ("Crooked Rhine") was dammed in 1122 at Wijk bij Duurstede. The same Bishop Godebald gave land development contracts to those who would completely drain this land and make it arable; Oostveen was a large section of this area.

The oldest settlement in the area is the village of Voordorp, which gradually became known as Blauwkapel because the chapel's interior was entirely blue. The name Voordorp has been revived and applied to a new northern district of the city of Utrecht. Blauwkapel still exists and is part of the Waterline and Fort defense system established to protect the provinces of Holland from inland invaders by flooding the land strategically and building fortresses where flooding was not feasible. Such a fort, the largest in this defense system, surrounds the old chapel. As land reclamation of Oostveen moved northward, a new settlement arose on the Oostveen lands that was dedicated by the Dean of St. Martin's Cathedral, Utrecht in protectione et iustitia Sancti Martini. This settlement was the seat of the gerecht or canton of Oostveen, and in 1812 was renamed Maartensdijk.

== Landmarks ==
- Landgoed Persijn

== Notable people ==
- Nicolaas van Nieuwland (1510 in Maartensdijk – 1580), Bishop of Haarlem and abbot of Egmond Abbey, 1562 to 1569
- Anne Sjerp Troelstra (1939 in Maartensdijk – 2019), maths professor
- Madelon Hooykaas (born 1942 in Maartensdijk), video artist
