= Den Aalshorst =

Coordinates: 52.4852°N 6.2488°E

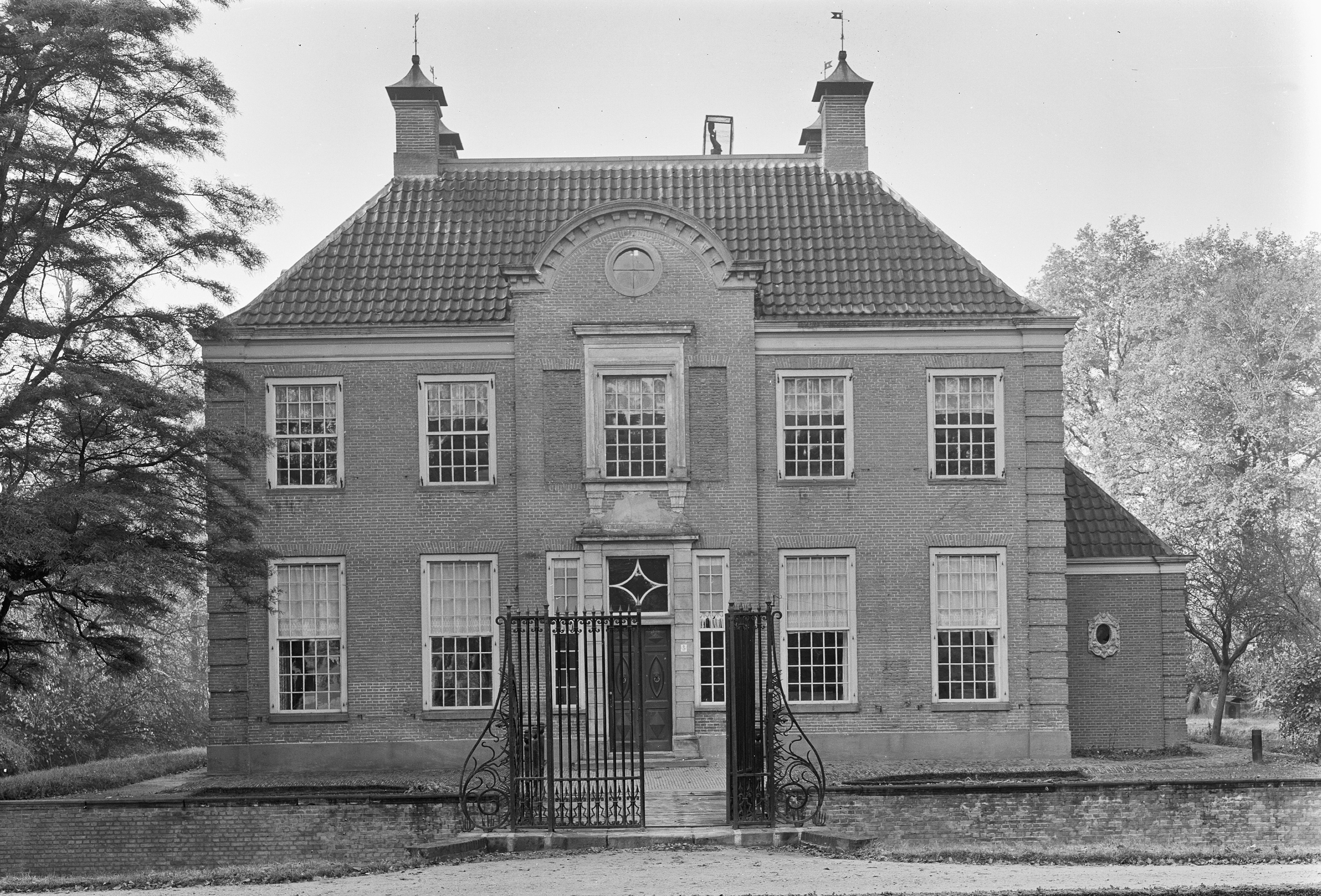
Facade of the house, November 1966

Den Aalshorst is a country house in the hamlet of Millingen in the municipality of Dalfsen in the Dutch province of Overijssel. The 450-hectare property is privately owned, but completely open to the public. It features an open landscape interspersed with 150 hectares of deciduous forest. As of 2007, the property was owned by 'N.V. den Aalshorst'.

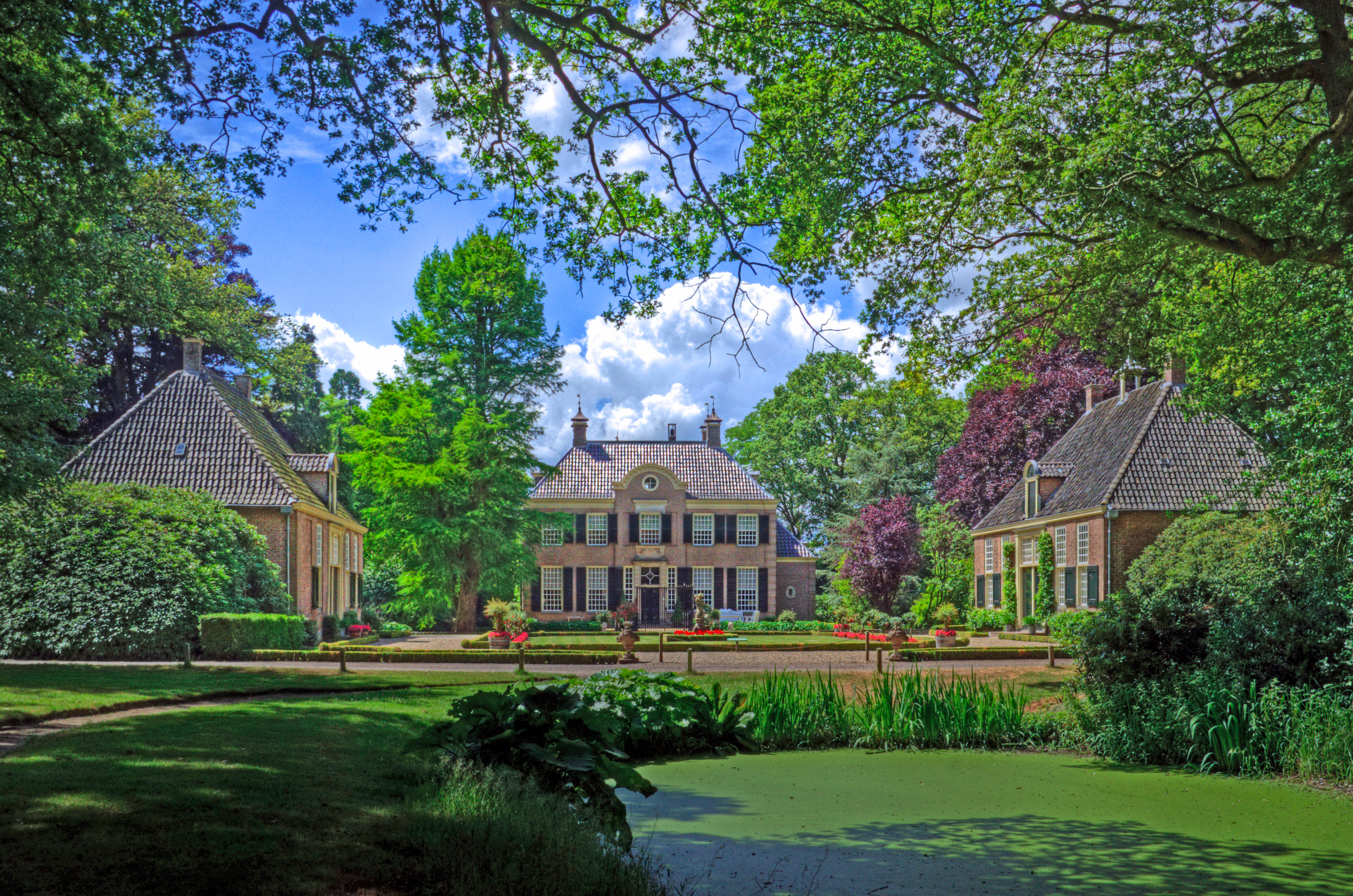
The estate in 2010.

The original house on the property was built in 1644, and rebuilt in 1720. Several features were added after this, including the two additional houses, some alleys, a grand canal, a moated manor garden, scenic avenues and a fishpond.

The property also has a garden from the 18th and 19th centuries with many original features including borders, water features and a collection of old fruit trees. The orchard contains many varieties of apple, pear and cherry trees. Garden tours are occasionally offered to the public.

The historical value of the site is recognized under Rijksmonument complex # 528700 (with several sub-numbers for various features on the property).
