= Voordorp =

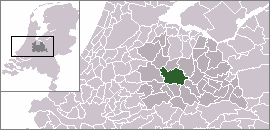

- Location within the Netherlands
- Coordinates: 52°6′N 5°9′E
- Country: Kingdom of the Netherlands
- Constituent country: Netherlands
- Province: Utrecht

Area
  - Total: 1.9 km^{2} (0.73 sq mi)
  - Land: 1.5 km^{2} (0.58 sq mi)
  - Water: 0.4 km^{2} (0.15 sq mi)

Population (2006)
  - Total: 3,000
  - Density: 1,578/km^{2} (4,090/sq mi)
- Time zone: UTC+1 (CET)
  - Summer (DST): UTC+2 (CEST)
- Website: www.voordorpvooruit.nl/

Voordorp is a district in the northeast of the city of Utrecht, the Netherlands. It has a population of approximately 3,000 citizens.

== History ==
Voordorp was named after an old church village, Voordorp, which changed its name to Blaue Capel (meaning 'blue chapel') after the local church was rebuilt and decorated in blue in 1451. It was built in the 90s as part of the last big expansion of Utrecht within the original city limits.

== Facilities ==
The 1.9 km^{2} (0.7 sq mi) area of Voordorp contains a primary school, a skate slope, a nursery. It borders highway A27 which is situated behind a noise barrier.

== Location ==
From the heart of Utrecht, Voordorp is a twelve-minutes bike ride or a twelve-minute drive. With the line 4 bus riding through Voordorp, it is possible to reach central station and the city center of Utrecht. Its streets are named after freedom fighters form the Dutch Resistance in World War Two.

== Innovation ==
Recently, Voordorp was one of the first districts to get an optical fibre connection. This connection is used for internet, television and telephone.
