= Leidsevaart =

Canal between the Dutch cities of Haarlem and Leiden

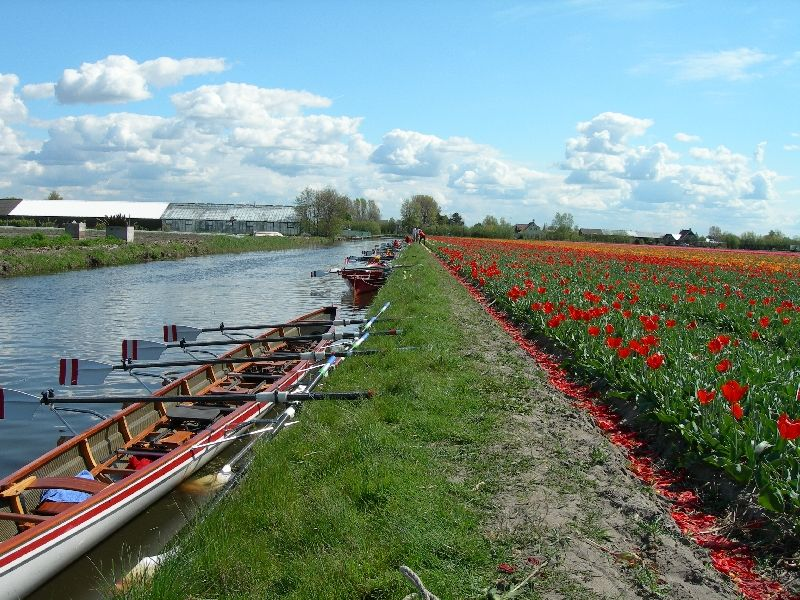
- The canal near Hillegom
- Country: Netherlands

Specifications
- Length: 28.4 km (17.6 miles)

Geography
- Direction: Northeast
- Start point: Leiden
- End point: Haarlem
- Beginning coordinates: 52°11′18″N 4°29′08″E
- Ending coordinates: 52°22′56″N 4°37′44″E

The Leidsevaart (also known as Leidse trekvaart, Dutch for "Leiden's Pull-Canal") is a canal between the cities of Haarlem and Leiden in the Netherlands. It was dug in 1657, making it one of the oldest canals in the Netherlands. It was the major means of transport between Leiden and Haarlem for almost two centuries until the rail connection was established in the 19th century. The original stops along the railway mirrored the toll bridges of the canal.

The canal runs through or borders the municipalities of Haarlem, Heemstede, Bloemendaal, Hillegom, Noordwijkerhout, Lisse, Teylingen, Oegstgeest, and Leiden.

== History ==
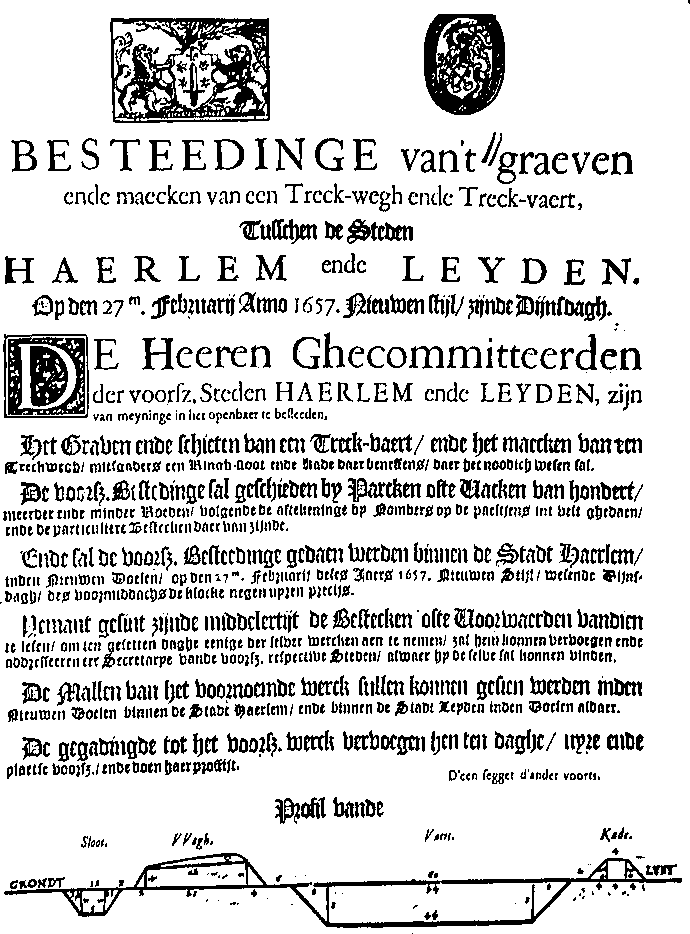
Document from 1657 authorizing construction of the canal.

The Leidsevaart was the extension of the Haarlemmertrekvaart (Haarlem's Pull-Canal) connecting Amsterdam to Haarlem. Travel on these canals was done by trekschuit for people, and by barge for goods, which were pulled by animals (and sometimes by man-power) on a towpath along the canal's edge. It was reliable, comfortable and cheap. The speed was about 7 kilometers per hour, which was faster than walking, and more comfortable than by coach. Many wealthy Amsterdam families had summer homes along the Leidsevaart or Spaarne River, and they arrived with their heavy belongings by barge, often being pulled or sailed all the way to their door, as most summer estates had canals dug for this purpose. Even today the old canals are visible though probably too shallow for a trekschuit.

The canal was kept up with toll money and taxes. Many estate owners spent money on making canal spurs to their doorstep and then had to pay taxes for fishing rights, "swan" keeping rights, or general canal use. The same was true for landowners whose lands were seized for digging the canal. They were compensated for the loss of the land strip taken up by the canal, but they had to pay for a bridge themselves. Trekschuit owners also had to pay taxes for using the canal. Taxes for traffic in people (by trekschuit) was heavier than taxes for traffic in goods (by barge).

After the railway line from Leiden to Haarlem (Oude Lijn) was built, many of these extra costs made trekschuit travel unattractive and the canal quickly fell in popularity from 1842 onwards. Due to the many drawbridges along its course that are no longer in operation, the Leidsevaart is unsuitable for boat traffic nowadays and therefore has fallen mostly in disuse.

== Estates along the Leidsevaart ==
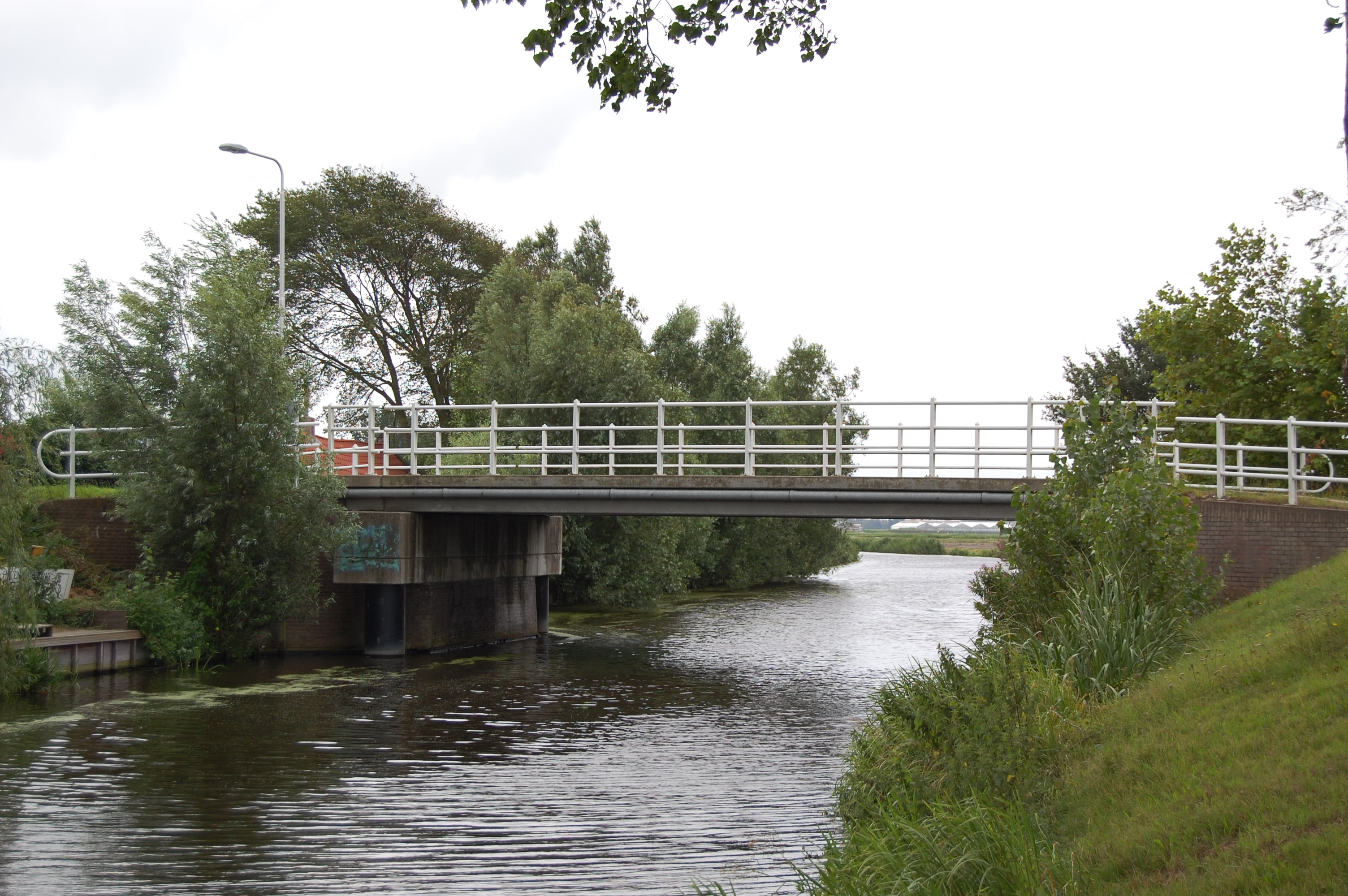
Example of a modern bridge strong enough for autos that has replaced the former drawbridge near Vogelenzang. Only small craft, and low sailing boats with a moveable mast can pass.

- Oud Poelgeest, home to Herman Boerhaave
- Keukenhof, former estate and scene of a yearly flower show in the Netherlands
- Huis te Vogelenzang (reachable via a rather long canal spur that continued straight when the canal approached Heemstede)
- The Hartekamp, home to George Clifford and famous for its Hortus Cliffortianus published by Carl Linnaeus
- Huis te Manpad, at the corner of the Manpadslaan and located at the toll bridge to Heemstede
- Leyduin, across from the Manpad
- Meer en Berg, at the end of the Manpad on the East side (now part of Groenendaal Park)
- Iepenrode, across from Groenendaal (now part of Groenendaal park)
- Berkenrode, across from the Haarlem toll bridge (today the location of Heemstede-Aerdenhout railway station)
- Alverna, a cloister across from Berkenrode
