= David Jacob van Lennep =

Dutch poet and academic

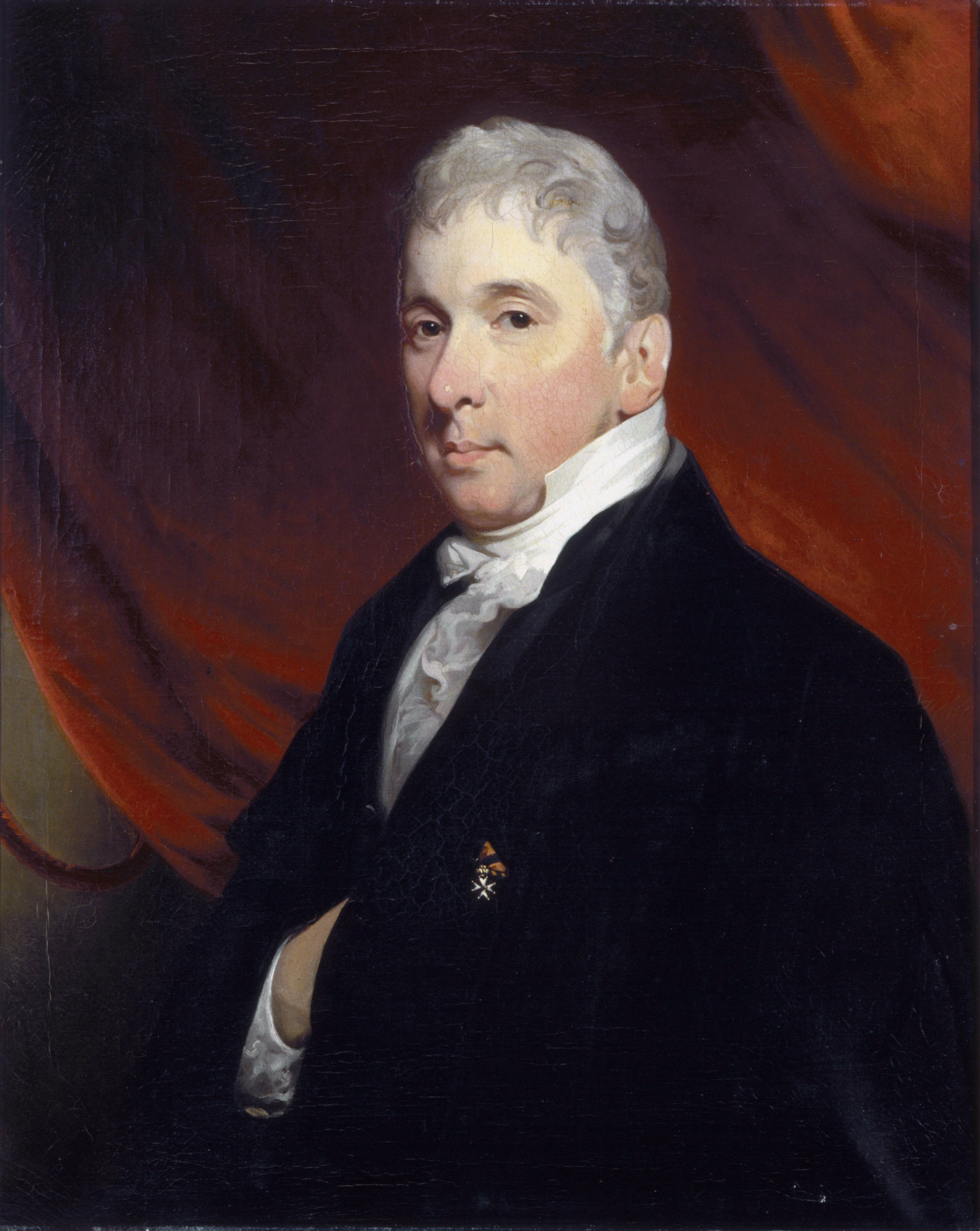
- D.J. van Lennep, painting by Hendrik Hollander Cz ca. 1850-1871
- Born: 15 July 1774; Amsterdam
- Died: 22 November 1853 (aged 79); Amsterdam
- Citizenship: Netherlands
- Education: Athenaeum Illustre of Amsterdam, Leiden University
- Scientific career
- Fields: Classics, Poetry
- Workplaces: Athenaeum Illustre of Amsterdam

David Jacob van Lennep (15 July 1774 – 1 February 1853) was Professor of Latin and Greek at the Athenaeum Illustre of Amsterdam, and a poet in Dutch and Neo-Latin.

== Education and private life ==
David Jacob van Lennep was born in Amsterdam, as a member of the Van Lennep Amsterdam patrician family. He was the son of Cornelis van Lennep (1751–1813) and Cornelia Henrietta van de Poll (1753–1827).

Van Lennep attended a common nursery school, as his father advocated education without class differentiation. From his fifth to tenth year he attended the French school, and then the Latin school in Amsterdam. At the latter he was a classmate of Matthijs Siegenbeek, who later became the first university professor of Dutch language and rhetorics.

In 1790 he enrolled at the Athenaeum Illustre where he read law and ancient Latin and Greek, writing a dissertation titled De loco Ciceronis qui est de finibus bonorum in 1793. He then continued his studies in Leiden, as graduation was not possible in Amsterdam. In 1796 he obtained a doctoral degree in law and established his law practice in Amsterdam. In 1799 he succeeded Daniël Wyttenbach at the Athenaeum Illustre in Amsterdam as professor of Greek, Latin, history, rhetoric, and antiquities. He later became an important advisor in Dutch politics.

Van Lennep married Cornelia (Keetje) Christina van Orsoy on 30 September 1800 at the Walloon Church in Amsterdam. The couple had a son, Jacob, and a daughter, Anna Louisa (Antje). After Keetje's death in 1816 Van Lennep remarried in 1819. With Anna Catharina van de Poll (1791-1860) he had nine further children, three daughters and six sons.

== Poetry ==
Van Lennep inherited the country house of Manpad near Heemstede from his father. He spent his summers here and was very attached to the house and life in the country. It inspired him to write a number of poems, both in Dutch and in Neo-Latin - he was one of the last Dutchmen who were able to compose Neo-Latin poetry. He was an active member of the Amsterdam societies Concordia et Libertate and Libertate et Concordia. His debut, titled Carmina juvenilia ("Youth's poems"), was published by his father at the occasion of his school graduation in 1790. In 1796 he published the volume Rusticatio Manpadica ("Rustic life at Manpad"). Poematum fasciculus ("Small bundle of poems") was published in 1850, including the poem ‘Ad Villae Manpadicae arbores’, translated into Dutch by his son Jan Hendrik (‘Aan de bomen van het Manpad’, "At the trees of Manpad House"). Van Lennep was also an active poet in Dutch, and a member of the Leiden society Kunst Wordt Door Arbeid Verkreegen. In 1826 he published the volume Hollandsch duinzang ("The Dutch dunes' song"). A collection of his Dutch poems was published in 1844, titled Gedichten van Mr. D.J. van Lennep.

== Academic career ==
As a professor at Amsterdam, Van Lennep concentrated mainly on teaching, and less on research. He had a reputation as an inspiring teacher who attracted many students. As an excellent speaker of Latin, he delivered the commemorating speech at the bicentenary of the Athenaeum Illustre in 1832. He regarded ancient Antiquity as the ideal model for morals and aesthetics.

Through his love for country life, Van Lennep had a predilection for Hesiod's didactic poem Works and Days. He translated it into Dutch hexameters (Amsterdam 1823, reprint 1834). Hesiod was the only classical author Van Lennep treated as a classical philologist. His editions of the Theogony and the Works and Days were published in 1843 and 1847 respectively; of the Shield of Heracles (ascribed to Hesiod) posthumously in 1854, edited by J.G. Hulleman.

Van Lennep corresponded with many scholars abroad, keeping well informed on many developments in the humanities. After Jean-François Champollion had deciphered the Egyptian hieroglyphs, he started studying Ancient Egypt and taught classes from the information then available. Considered the first Dutch Egyptologist, he was an important influence on his student Caspar Reuvens, later the world's first professor of Archaeology.

== Governance ==
In 1808 Van Lennep was appointed – despite his initial reluctance – member in the Second Class, and later librarian, of the Koninklijk Instituut van Wetenschappen. When king Louis Bonaparte insisted he agreed to the position, and even gave the monarch Dutch language lessons at Het Loo Palace for a time. Van Lennep resigned from the Institute in 1809. In 1812 he was reappointed, only to resign once more in 1851.

After the French Period his main activities were in politics. In 1814-1815 he was part of the national committee responsible for drafting regulations for higher education. In addition he was appointed member of the Provincial Council in 1815.

== Later years ==
In 1838 Van Lennep resigned from most of his duties as professor, but continued to teach a number of classes. He celebrated his 50 years' jubilee on 19 November 1849 and gave his farewell lecture at that occasion. After a short illness he died on 11 February 1853 and was interred at Heemstede. One month later H.J. Koenen held a memorial speech at the Athenaeum Illustre. His son Jacob van Lennep collected various texts and biographic information in Het leven van Mr. D.J. van Lennep, beschreven in verband met zijn tijd, toegelicht uit zijn gedichten en vermeerderd met ongedrukte brieven en bescheiden (two volumes, Amsterdam 1862). His wife Anna died in 1860.

== Literature ==
- M. Mathijsen, Jacob van Lennep, een bezielde schavuit. Amsterdam: Balans, 2018. ISBN 978-94-600-3850-1.
- W. van den Berg, ‘David Jacob van Lennep (1774-1853). Geliefd leermeester zonder volgelingen’, in: E.O.G. Haitsma Mulier et al. (eds.), Athenaeum Illustre. Elf studies over de Amsterdamse Doorluchtige School, 1632–1877, Amsterdam: Amsterdam University Press 1997, 173-198.
- P. Gerbrandy, ‘Rura placent nobis, de Rusticatio Manpadica van David Jacob van Lennep’, in: Hermeneus 60,5 (1988), 314-319.
- P. Gerbrandy, ‘De Mus. Een pastorale pastiche door David Jacob van Lennep’, in: Hermeneus 63,3 (1991), 183-187.
- D.C.A.J. Schouten, Het Grieks aan de Nederlandse universiteiten in de negentiende eeuw, bijzonder gedurende de periode 1815-1876, dissertation Utrecht University 1964, 483-503.
