= Jan van Logteren =

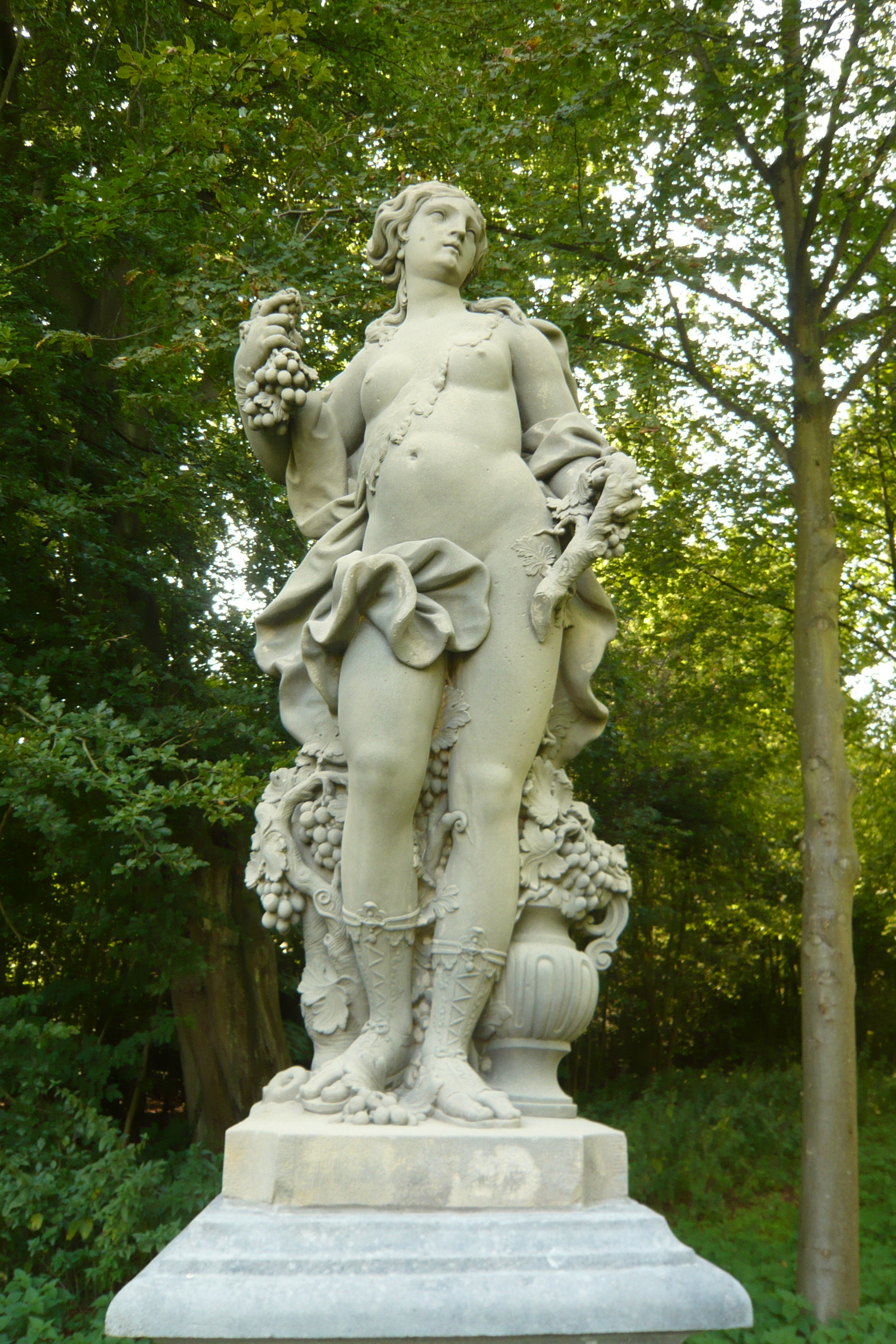
Statue of Ariadne on the grounds of Huis te Manpad in Heemstede, by Jan van Logteren, 1734

Jan van Logteren (baptized on 8 March 1709 – buried 11 October 1745), was an 18th-century draftsman and sculptor from the Dutch Republic.

== Biography ==
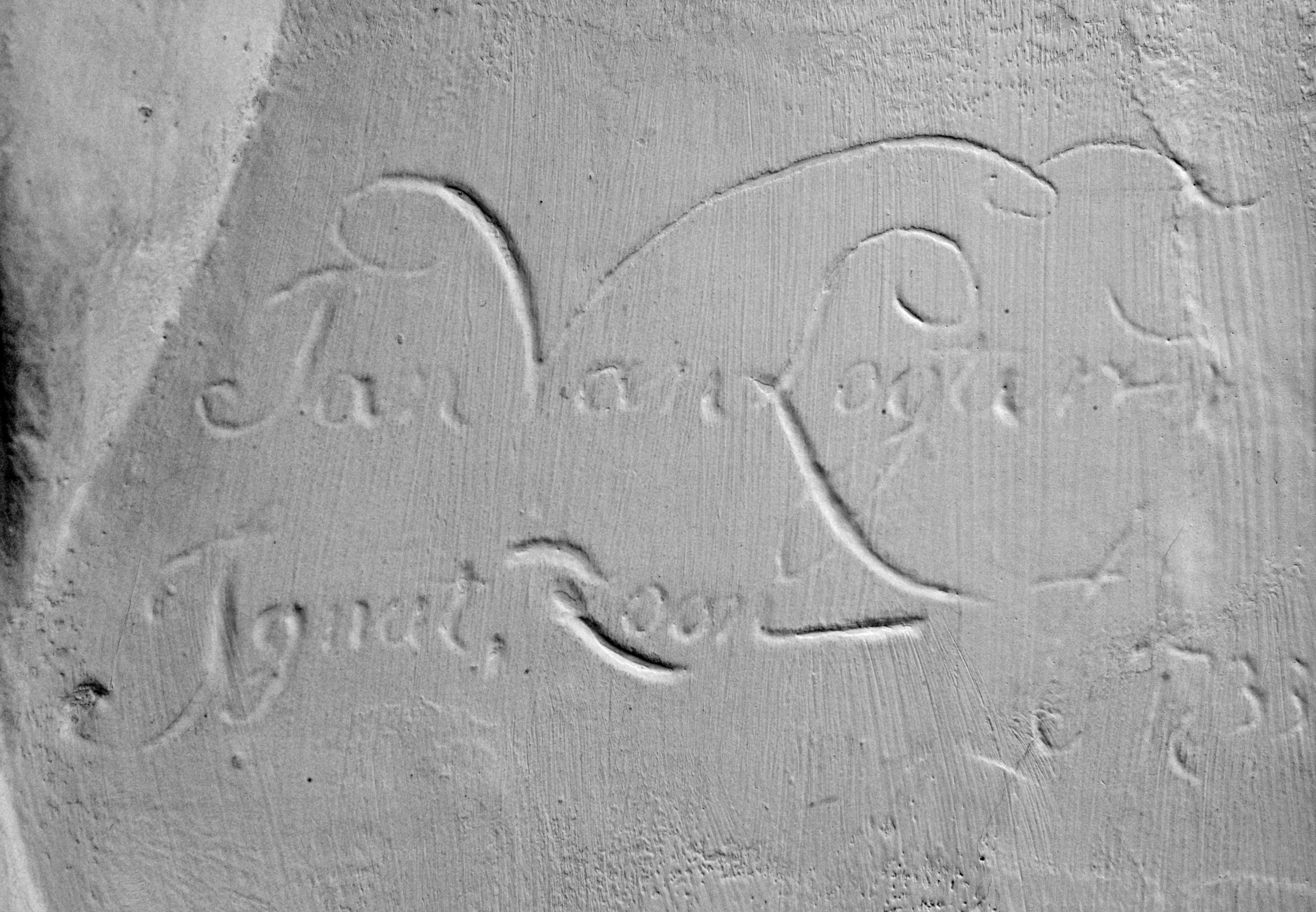
Signature

He was born in Amsterdam as the son of the successful sculptor Ignatius van Logteren. He became his father's pupil and assistant who continued his father's workshop (in November 1732) in statuary and decorative stucco reliefs for the wealthy mansion owners of Amsterdam. In 1734 he married. In 1737 his daughter was baptized in a hidden church He stopped working in 1741. Van Logteren died on an early age, probably of silicosis.

Van Logteren was a friend of Jacob de Wit, a catholic painter. His most famous work today is the stucco work he made for the Christiaan Müller organ in the Grote Kerk, Haarlem. Other works by him in Huis te Manpad, and Moses and Aaron church.

== Sources ==
P.M. Fischer (2005) Ignatius and Jan van Logteren. Beeldhouwers en stuckunstenaars in het Amsterdam van de 18de eeuw. Bezorgd door E. Munnig Schmidt.
