= De Naald, Heemstede =

Monument in Heemstede, Netherlands

Coordinates: 52°20′11″N 4°36′11″E

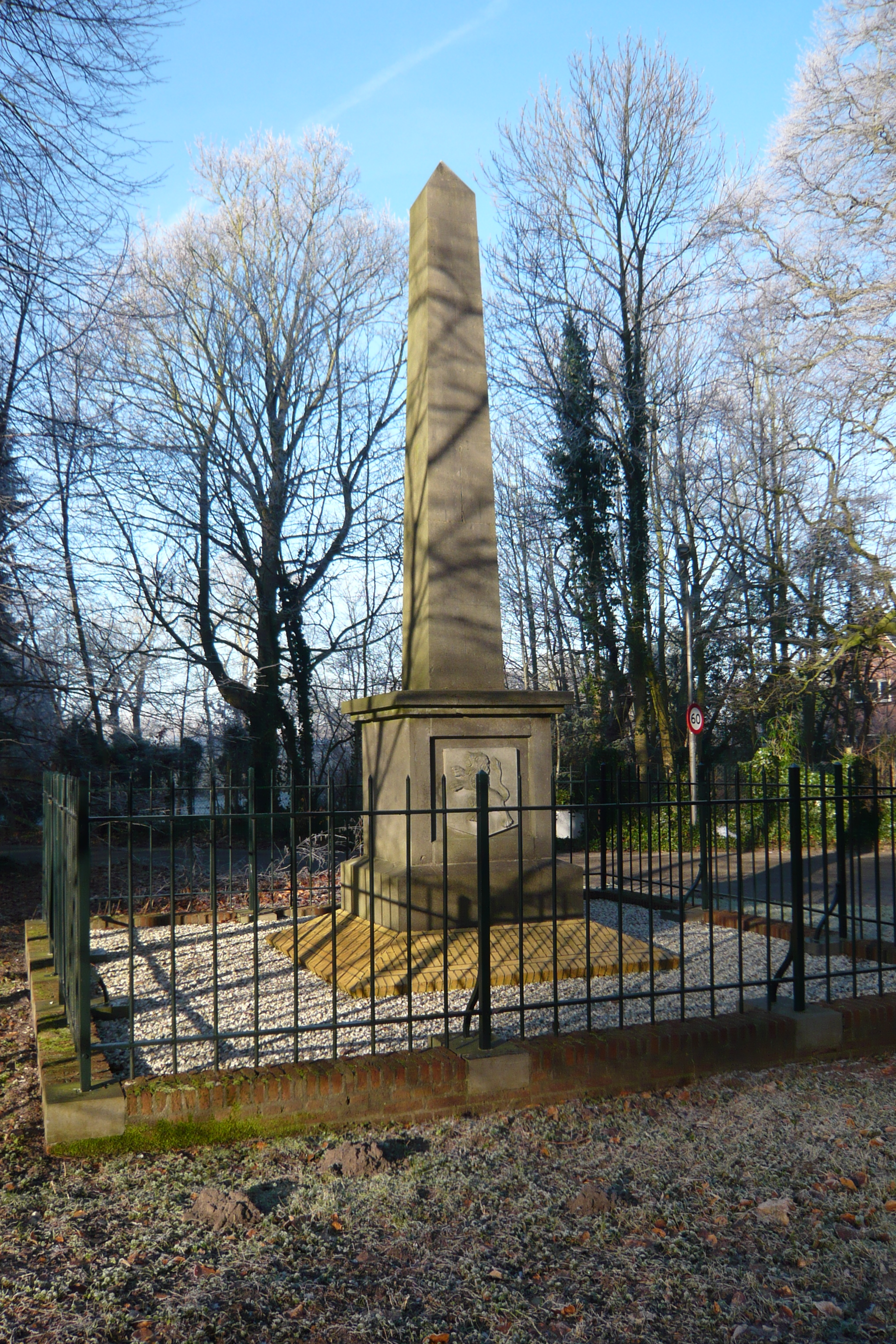
De Naald, Heemstede

De Naald (the Needle) is a monument in Heemstede, Netherlands, erected in 1817 by the city council to commemorate two battles on the Manpad road running next to the site. The site is at the corner of the Manpad, and Herenweg, on property belonging to the estate 'Huis te Manpad'.

== Inscription ==
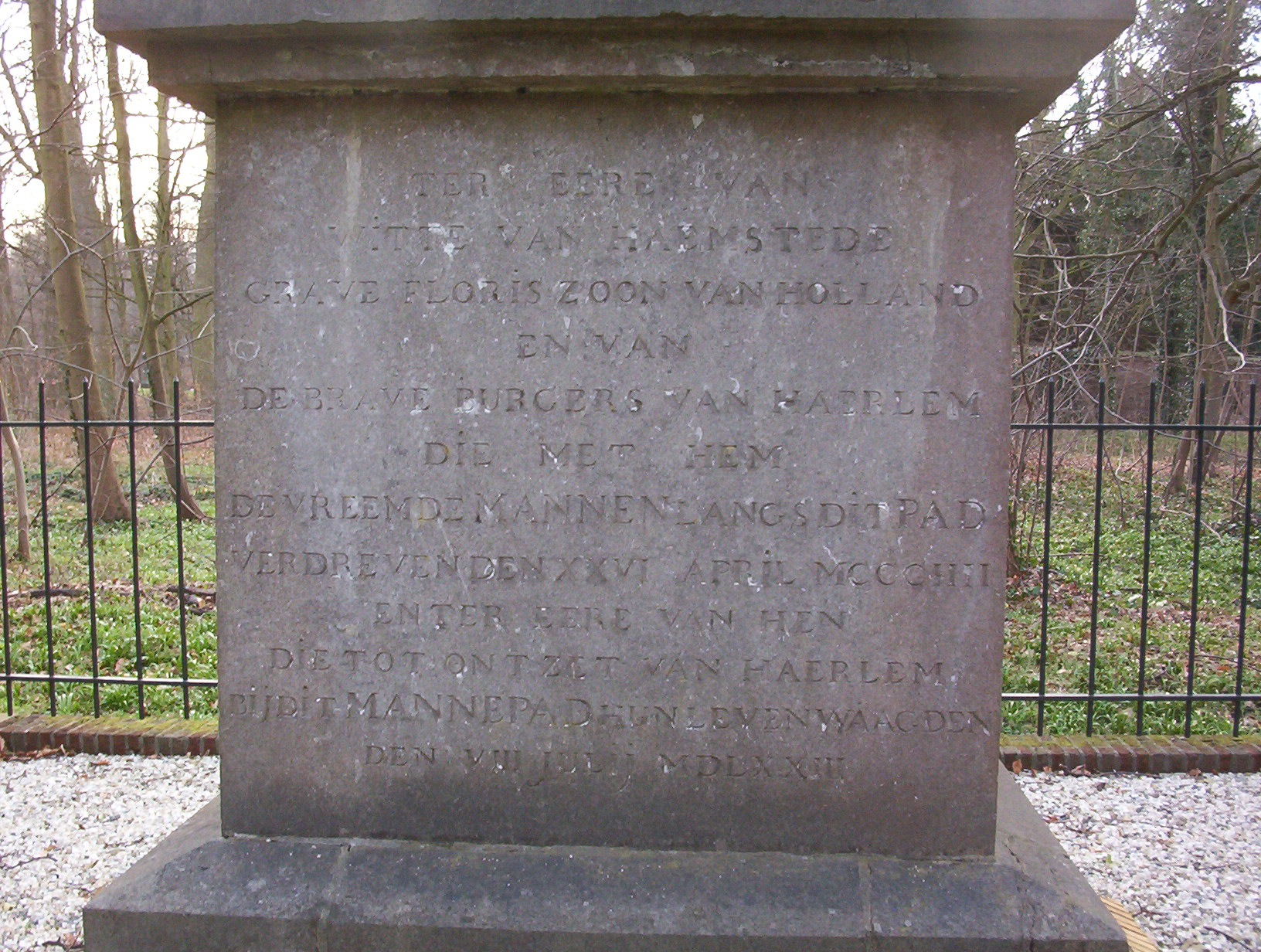
Inscription on monument 'De Naald', Heemstede

Ter ere van
Witte van Haemstede
Grave Floris zoon van Holland
en van
de brave burgers van Haerlem
die met hem
de vreemde MANNEN langs dit PAD
verdreven den XXVI April MCCCIIII
en ter eere van hen
die tot ontzet van Haerlem
bij dit MANNEPAD hun leven waagden
den VIII Julij MDLXXIII

Translation:

To honor
Witte van Haemstede
son of Count Floris V of Holland
and of
the brave citizens of Haarlem
who with him
drove away the foreign men along this road
on the 26th of April 1304
and to honor those
who risked their lives here to relieve
Haarlem's siege
on July 8, 1573.

== History ==
De Naald is the name the locals have given the monument. The 'needle' has often been mistaken for the border mark between Heemstede and Bennebroek, but in fact the border is further south. nl:David Jacob van Lennep (classicus), who lived in the 'Huis te Manpad' behind the monument, was a Dutch poet and professor of classical languages in Amsterdam. His son, Jacob van Lennep, who was 15 at the time of the monument's placement, later wrote a song commemorating 'Witte van Haemstede', one of the heroes mentioned on the monument. Later historians have questioned whether these events did in fact take place, and also whether the location is correct. The Manpad was a generic name for the North-South route along the Dune ridge running from The Hague to Alkmaar. In most towns the road took on the name of Hoofdweg, the equivalent of 'Main Street'. This particular stretch of Manpad actually runs East-West, crossing the Leidsevaart from one sand ridge to another. The battles, if they took place, could have taken place anywhere along the Manpad. It is unlikely that Witte van Haemstede would reach Haarlem via the Manpad from Zandvoort, as the legend has it. The most direct route to Haarlem from Zandvoort is via the Visserspad.

== Location ==
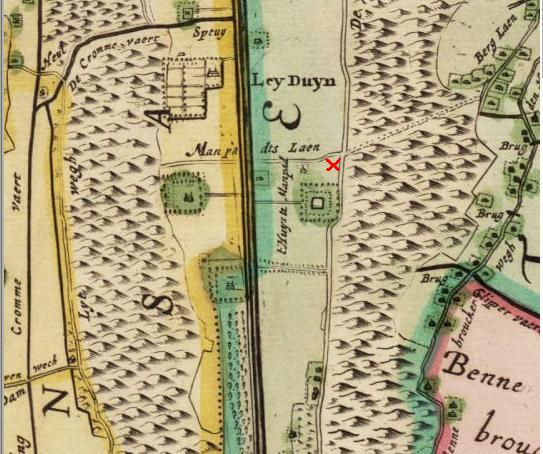
Red X shows site 'De Naald' on old map of Heemstede

On this 1687 map, the Manpad is the main east-west route connecting Vogelenzang to Heemstede. This little map is a detail of a larger map showing the entire route of the Leidsevaart from Leiden to Haarlem (this is the black vertical double line in the middle). This piece of the old Manpad is the only piece with that name on the map. To the right of the Herenweg the Manpad continues east through what is now Groenendaal park towards the old center of Heemstede and the Haarlem lake (Haarlemmermeer). This footpath in the park still exists, though the east side of the park has changed quite a bit since the Haarlemmermeer was pumped dry in 1853.
