= Heemstede Castle =

Castle in the Netherlands, now demolished

- Slot Heemstede
- Heemstede, the Netherlands
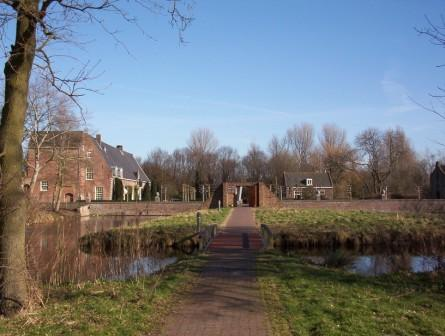
- Oude Slot, Heemstede

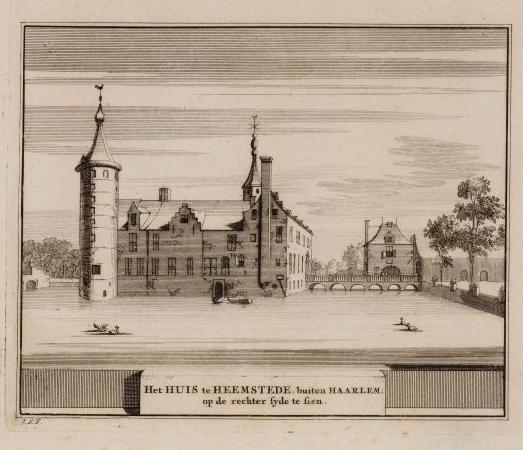
- Heemstede Castle on a print from ca. 1650

Site information
- Type: Castle
- Condition: Ruin

Location
- the Netherlands
- Coordinates: 52°20′23″N 4°37′53″E

Site history
- Built: 1280
- Materials: Brick
- Demolished: 1810

Heemstede Castle (Dutch: Slot Heemstede) is the site of the old castle of Heemstede. The property is situated at the site of the former castle 'Heerlijkheid Heemstede', or 'Huis te Heemstede', at a strategic position on mouth of the Spaarne river on the Haarlem lake (since 1853 pumped dry and called the Haarlemmermeer polder).

== History ==
The castle was first built in 1280, by Dirk van Hoylede from the region of Vlaardingen. Built, burned and rebuilt over the centuries, it was last torn down in 1810, after years of neglect. The monumental gatekeeper's house 'Nederhuys', built in 1630, remains intact as well as the foundations from the Middle Ages.

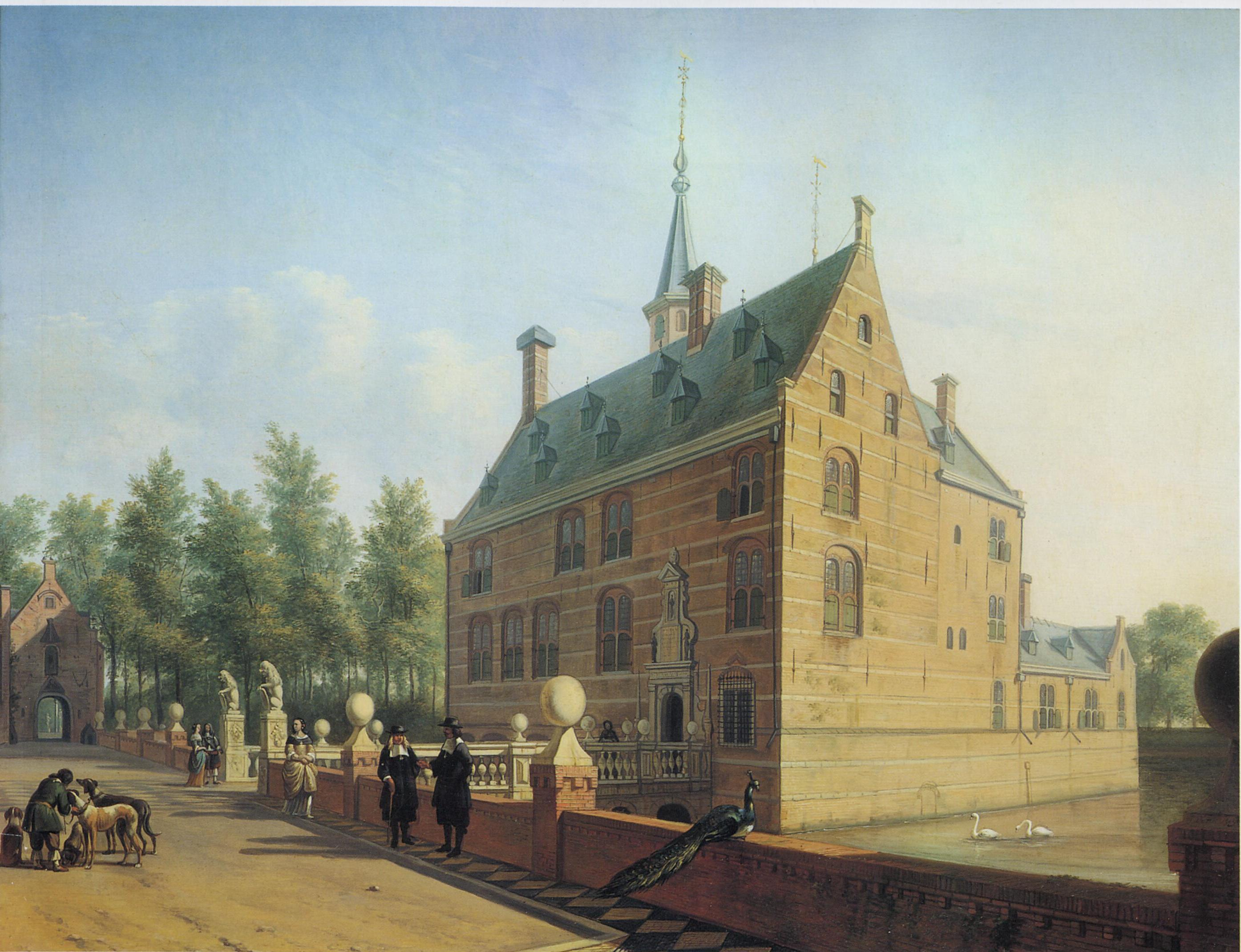
Huis te Heemstede in 1667 by Gerrit Adriaenszoon Berckheyde from the North.

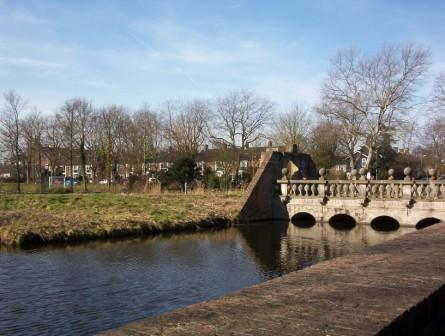
Pons Pacis, or 'Peace Bridge' installed by Adriaan Pauw from the South, Oude Slot, Heemstede

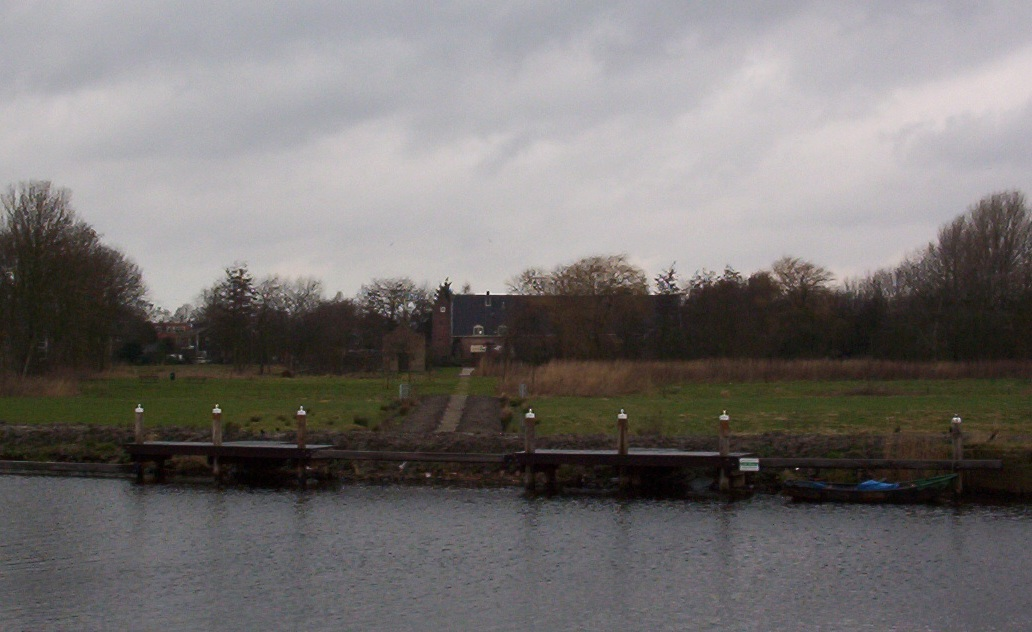
Boat landing on the Ringvaart for water tourists.

== Adrian Pauw ==
The most famous owner of the castle was Adriaan Pauw, who bought it in 1620. He played a role in the Treaty of Münster, and built the bridge Pons Pacis to commemorate the peace treaty.

== See also ==
- List of castles in the Netherlands
