= Van Lennep =

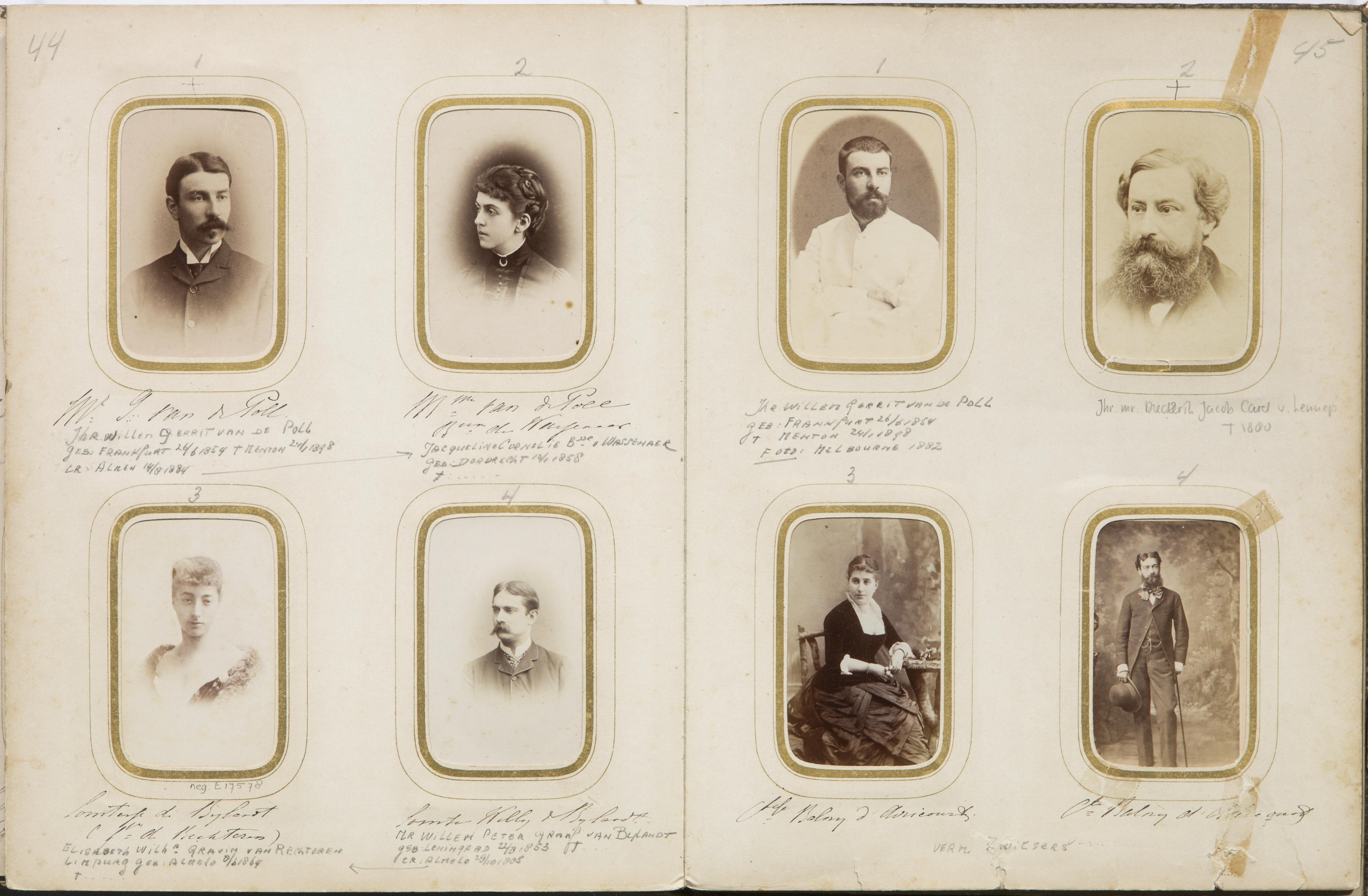

Van Lennep may refer to:

- Aernout van Lennep (1898–1974), Dutch equestrian
- Christiaan van Lennep (1887–1955), Dutch tennis player
- Frederick Van Lennep (1911–1987), American advertising executive
- Gijs van Lennep (born 1942), Dutch racing driver
- Jacob van Lennep (1802–1868), Dutch poet
- Mies Boissevain-van Lennep (1896–1965), Dutch resistance hero
- Mary E. Van Lennep (1821–1844), American missionary, school founder, memoirist
- Norman van Lennep (1872–1897), Dutch chess master
