= Ignatius van Logteren =

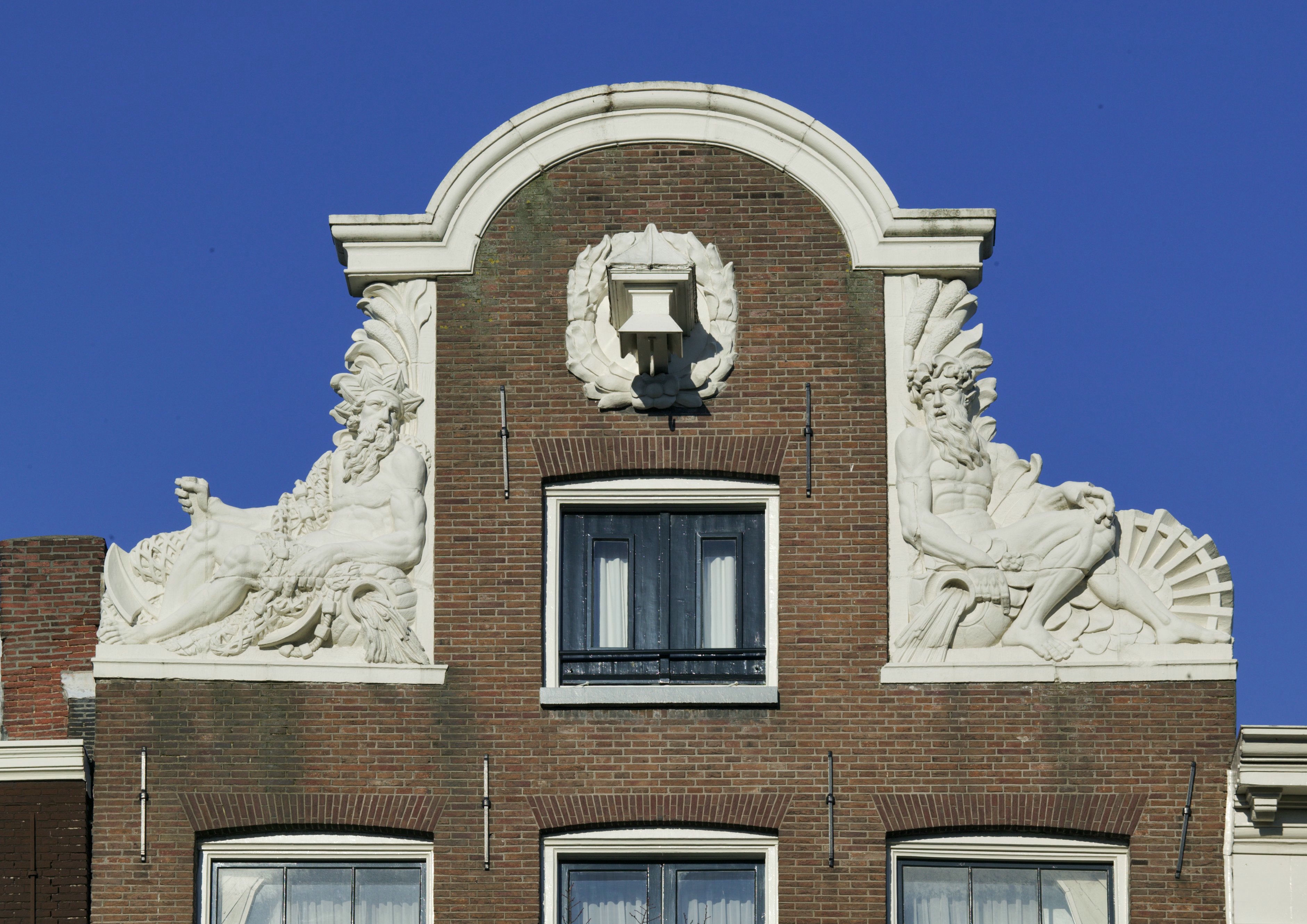
Stucco of river gods by Ignatius van Logteren on facade of Keizersgracht 695, Amsterdam

Ignatius van Logteren (1685 – 1732) was an 18th-century sculptor from the Dutch Republic.

== Biography ==
He was born in Amsterdam and was possibly the pupil of Francis van Bossuit, since his work was heavily influenced by him. He became the father of the sculptor Jan van Logteren, who assisted him in his workshop in statuary and stucco reliefs for the wealthy mansion owners of Amsterdam. He died in Amsterdam.

== Public collections ==
Among the public collections holding works by Ignatius van Logteren are:

- Museum de Fundatie in Zwolle
