= Jacob van Lennep =

Dutch poet and novelist (1802–1868)

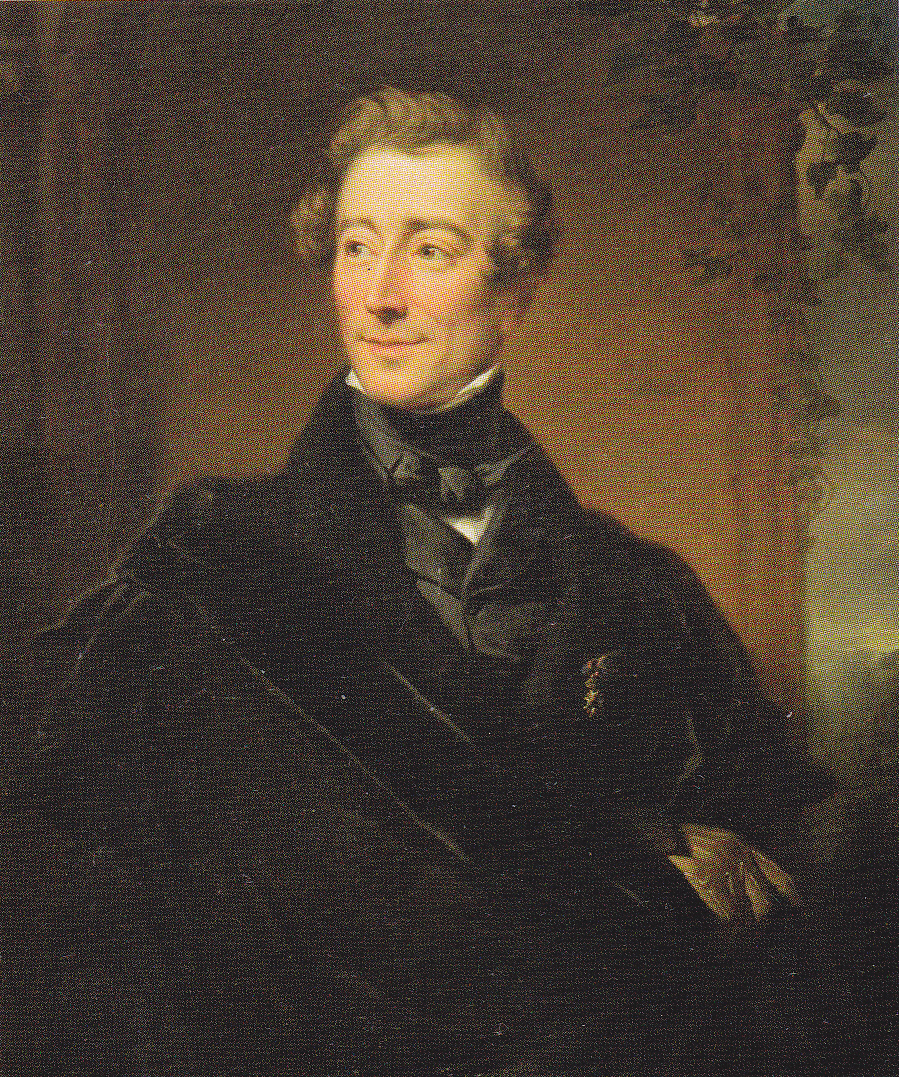
- Born: 24 March 1802; Amsterdam
- Died: 25 August 1868 (aged 66); Oosterbeek
- Occupations: Historian, novelist, and poet
- Writing career
- Subject: Historical fiction
- Notable work: The Rose of Dekama
- Website: dbnl.org/auteurs/auteur.php?id=lenn006

Jacob van Lennep (24 March 1802 – 25 August 1868) was a Dutch poet and novelist.

== Early years ==
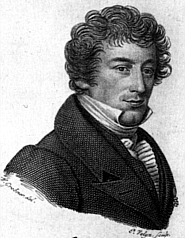
(drawing by Grebner & Velijn)

He was born in Amsterdam, where his father, David Jacob van Lennep (1774–1853), a scholar and poet, was professor of eloquence and the classical languages in the Atheneum. He spent his summers at Huis te Manpad, where his family had a summer home, and where his father convinced the Heemstede city council to place a monument to Witte van Haemstede. This colorful monument influenced him to later write a song about it. Lennep took the degree of doctor of laws at Leiden, and then settled as an advocate in Amsterdam.

== Poetry ==
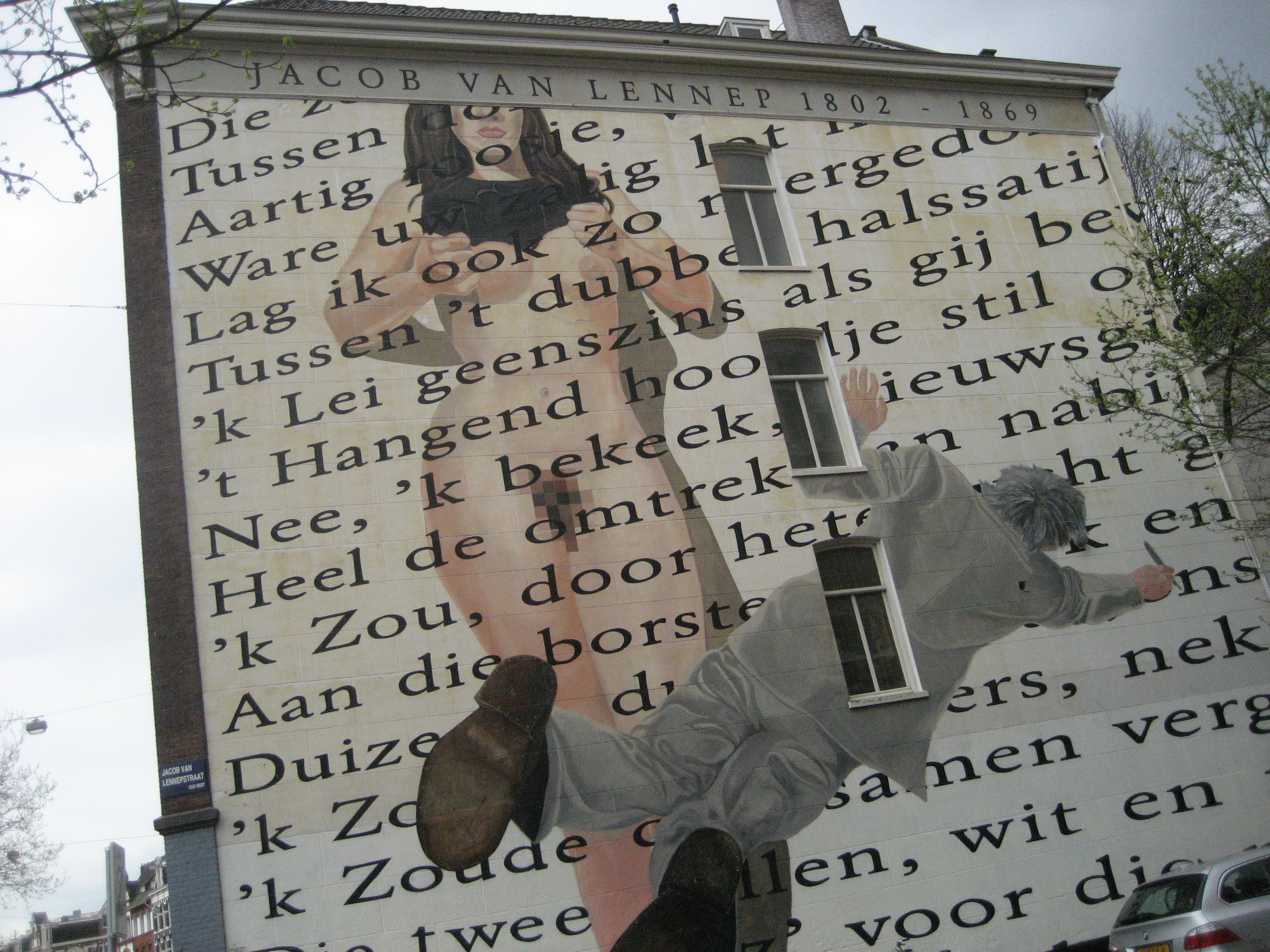
Wall poem (To a Rose) in Amsterdam

His first poetical efforts had been translations from Byron, of whom he was an ardent admirer, and in 1826 he published a collection of original Academische Idyllen [Academic Idylls], which had some success.

== Historical fiction ==
He first attained genuine popularity by the Nederlandsche Legenden [The Legends of the Netherlands] (2 vols., 1828) which reproduced, after the manner of Sir Walter Scott, some of the more stirring incidents in the early history of his fatherland. His fame was further raised by his patriotic songs at the time of the Belgian revolution, and by his comedies Het Dorp aan de Grenzen [The Village at the Borders] (1830) and Het Dorp over de Grenzen [The Village Over the Borders] (1831), which also had reference to the political events of 1830. In 1832 he became member of the Royal Institute, which later became the Royal Netherlands Academy of Arts and Sciences.

In 1833 he broke new ground with the publication of De Pleegzoon [The Adopted Son], the first of a series of historical romances in prose, which acquired for him in the Netherlands a position somewhat analogous to that of Sir Walter Scott in Great Britain. The series included De Roos van Dekama [The Rose of Dekama] (2 vols., 1836), Onze Voorouders [Our Ancestors] (5 vols., 1838). De Lotgevallen van Ferdinand Huyck [The Adventures of Ferdinand Huyck] (2 vols, 1840), Elizabeth Musch (3 vols., 1850), and De Lotgevallen van Klaasje Zevenster [The Adventures of Klaasje Zevenster] (5 vols., 1865), several of which have been translated into German and French, and two — The Rose of Dekama (1847) and The Adopted Son (New York, 1847) into English.

His Dutch history for young people (De voornaamste geschiedenissen van Noord-Nederland, aan zijne kinderen verhaald [The Chief Events of the North Netherlands, narrated to His Children], 4 vols, 1845) is attractively written. Apart from the two comedies already mentioned, van Lennep was an indefatigable journalist and literary critic, the author of numerous dramatic pieces, and of an excellent edition of Vondel's works. For some years, van Lennep held a judicial appointment, and from 1853 to 1856 he was a member of the Second Chamber of the Dutch Parliament, in which he voted with the conservative party. He died at Arnhem in 1868.

There is a collective edition of his Poetische Werken [Poetic Works] (13 vols., 1859–1872), and also of his Romantische Werken [Romantic Works] (23 vols., 1855 r872). See also a bibliography by P. Knoll (1869); and Jan ten Brink, Geschiedenis der Noord-Nederlandsche Letteren in de XIX Eeuw [History of the Literature of the Northern Netherlands in the Nineteenth Century], No. iii.
