= Huis te Manpad =

Coordinates: 52°20′08″N 4°36′02″E

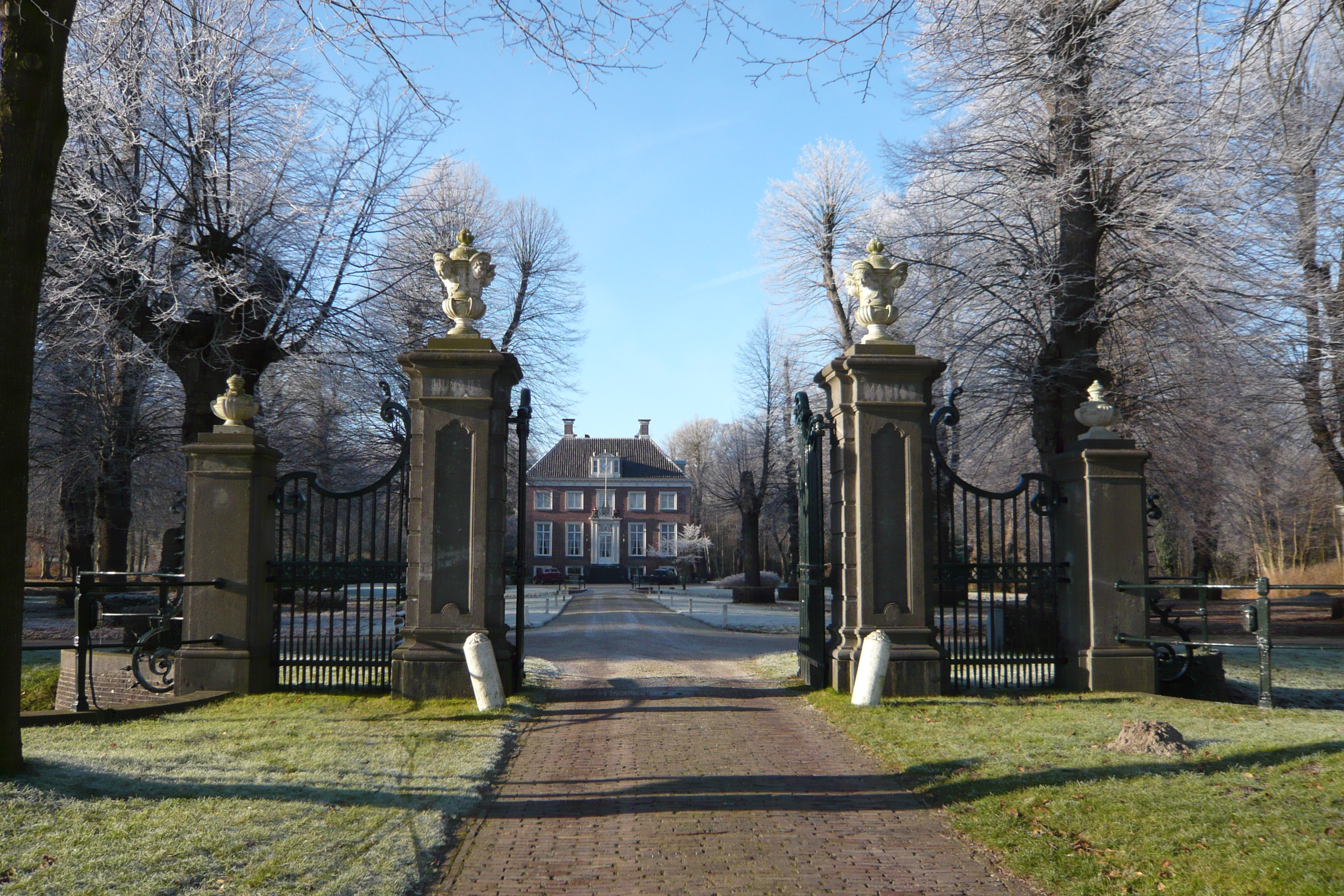
View of Huis te Manpad from the Herenweg, the road from Haarlem to Leiden that leads along 17th and 18th century summer homes.

The Huis te Manpad is an historical villa and former summer home of Jacob van Lennep in Heemstede, the Netherlands; bordered by the Leidsevaart canal, the Manpadslaan, and the Herenweg. It neighbors the estate of Hartekamp, famed for the gardens described by Carl Linnaeus. Both estates still have trees and other flora dating from that period.

The Haarlem archives have material about the estate dating back to 1558. The current main building dates from 1630. It was restored in 1720 when the gardens received an overhaul (the same Arcadia gardening period in the Haarlem area that drew Linnaeus to Hartekamp). In 1767 the villa came into the possession of the Van Lennep family, who owned it up to 1953. In 1945 it was again restored by Monumentenzorg. Thanks to the loving care of the Van Lennep's, the gardens were almost intact in the form they had been in Linnaeus's day, and it is currently being restored.

The most recent private owner, Jan Visser, gave it to the Stichting Huis te Manpad on his death.

In 1817 the then owner of the estate, David Jacob van Lennep, placed a monument at the corner of his property commemorating two battles that supposedly took place there.

The house and gardens are not open to the public. During spring and summer months weekly tours are available.

== Literature ==
- Joustra, Barbara: Het Huis te Manpad. Huis, park en bewoners door de eeuwen heen; met medewerking van Mieke T. Wilmink-Van Harmelen & Henrick S. van Lennep. Alphen a/d Rijn, 2003. ISBN 90-6469-790-6. Geïll. 172 p. Tweede druk 2004.
- van Lennep, Jacob: De Roos van Dekama (in Dutch)

== See also ==
- De Naald: monument at the corner of the property placed by D.J. van Lennep in 1817
