= Heemstede =

Municipality in North Holland, Netherlands

- Town and municipality
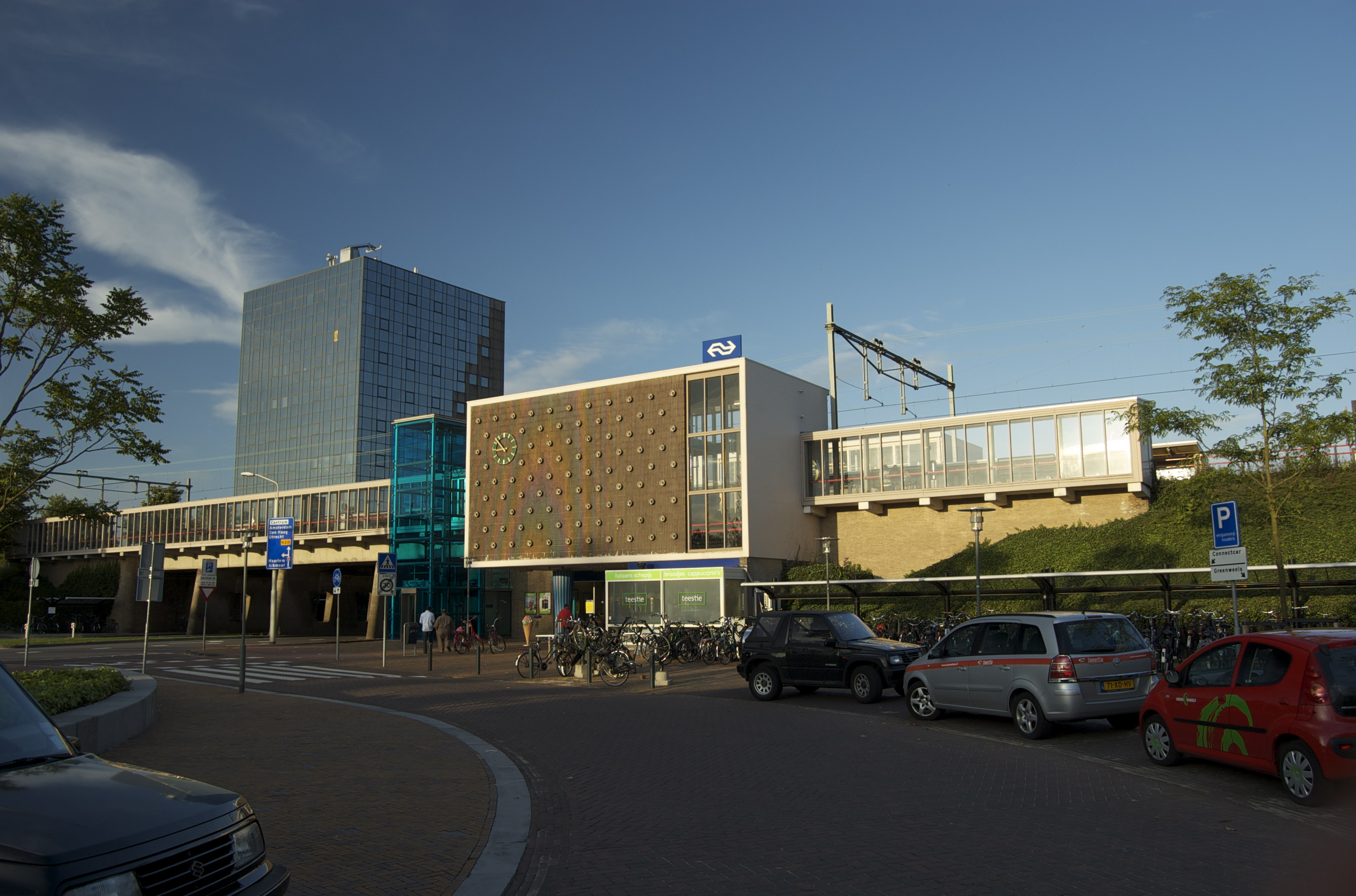
- Heemstede-Aerdenhout railway station

- Flag Coat of arms

- Location in North Holland
- Coordinates: 52°21′N 4°37′E
- Country: Netherlands
- Province: North Holland

Government
  - Body: Municipal council
  - Mayor: Falgun Binnendijk (CDA)

Area
  - Total: 9.64 km^{2} (3.72 sq mi)
  - Land: 9.18 km^{2} (3.54 sq mi)
  - Water: 0.46 km^{2} (0.18 sq mi)
- Elevation: 1 m (3.3 ft)

Population (January 2021)
  - Total: 27,545
  - Density: 3,001/km^{2} (7,770/sq mi)
- Demonym(s): Heemstedenaar, Heemsteder
- Time zone: UTC+1 (CET)
  - Summer (DST): UTC+2 (CEST)
- Postcode: 2100–2106
- Area code: 023
- Website: www.heemstede.nl

Heemstede (Dutch pronunciation: [ˈɦeːmsteːdə]) is a town and a municipality in the Western Netherlands, in the province of North Holland. In 2021, it had a population of 27,545. Located just south of the city of Haarlem on the border with South Holland, it is one of the richest municipalities of the Netherlands.

== History ==
Heemstede formed around the Heemstede Castle that was built overlooking the Spaarne River around 1286. Before 1296, Floris V, Count of Holland, granted Heemstede as a fiefdom to Reinier of Holy. During the 14th century, a village formed near the castle, which was destroyed and rebuilt several times in this period. A resident of this castle was Adriaan Pauw, who bought it in 1620. In 1653, Bennebroek split off from Heemstede, becoming a separate fiefdom.

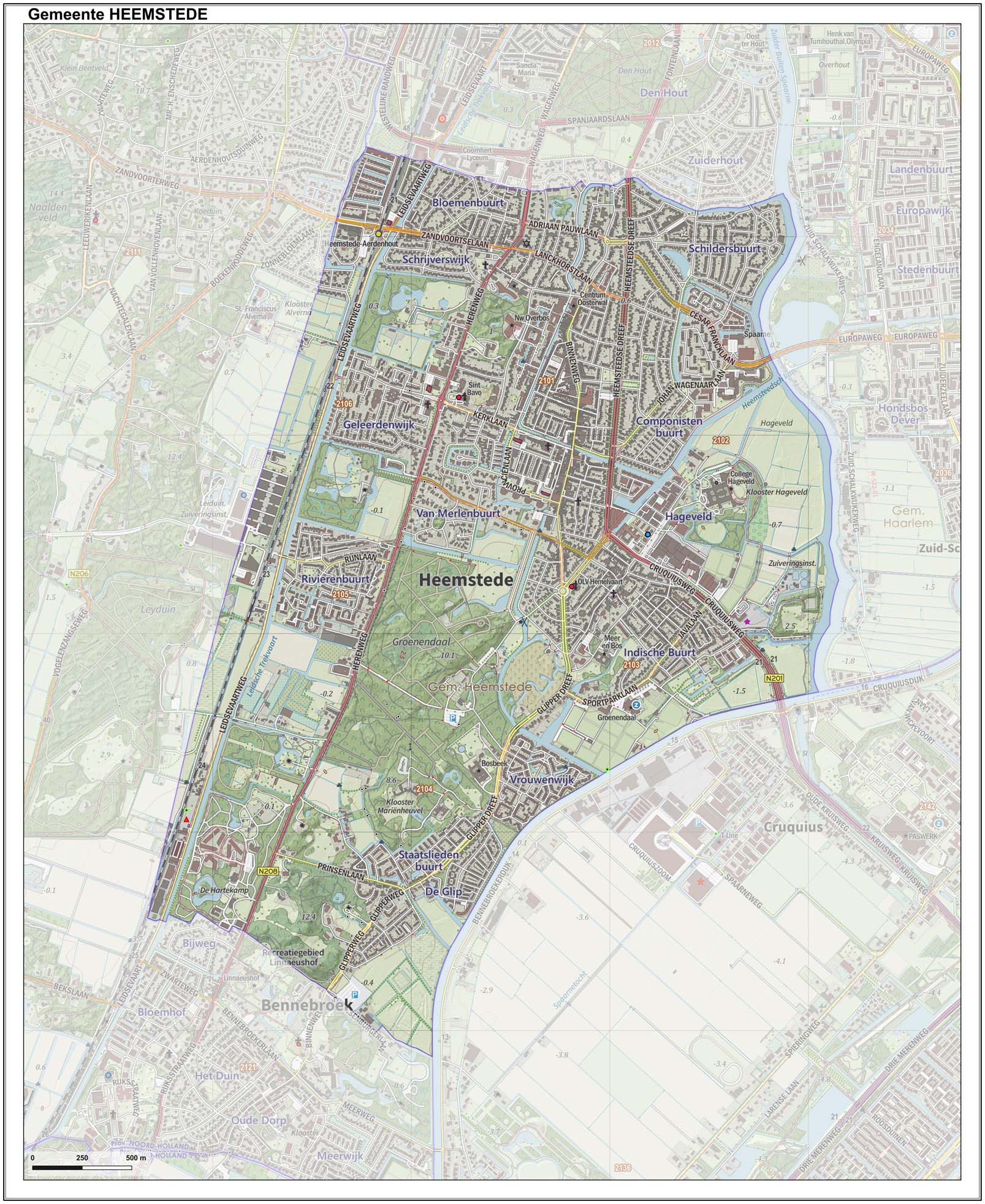
Map of Heemstede

Growth was slow; in 1787 Heemstede counted 196 families. Even at that early date Heemstede had gained the reputation it has today, of being primarily a commuter town for the cities of Haarlem and Amsterdam. Wealthy city families left the cities in the summer, escaping "canal fever" which caused illness from the putrid canals. As a result, many estates were built in the 17th and 18th centuries, some of which (partially) remain today, such as Oud-Berkenroede, Berkenrode, Ipenrode, Huis te Manpad, Hartekamp, Bosbeek, Meer en Bosch, Meer en Berg, and Gliphoeve.

In 1857, the municipality Berkenrode was merged with Heemstede. In 1927, the northern portion of Heemstede, including a large part of the Haarlemmerhout forest, was added to the city of Haarlem.

== Monuments and parks ==
- Groenendaal Park: Designed by Jan Hope, it was formed by merging several country estates into one.
- Vrijheidsbeeld (Freedom Statue), statue by Mari Andriessen to celebrate freedom and commemorate Heemstede victims of the Dutch Revolt. Located on the Vrijheidsdreef in Groenendaal park.
- Heemstede Castle: The site of the former Heemstede castle.
- Hartekamp: Heemstede summer home of George Clifford, who hired Carl Linnaeus to write his Hortus Cliffortianus, a detailed catalogue of the plant specimens in the herbarium and gardens of Hartecamp. George Clifford's house is closed to the public, but the surrounding gardens are used as a campus and are open to visitors.
- Linnaeusbos (Linnaeus Forest): Originally a part of Hartekamp that was planted by George Clifford and documented by Linnaeus. In 2007, Heemstede celebrated Linnaeus's 300th birthday.
- De Naald: The 'needle' is a monument placed by D.J. van Lennep to honour Witte van Haemstede, the saviour of Haarlem at a battle which on 26 April 1304 and to honor the wounded of another battle fought against the Spanish on 8 July 1573. Both battles supposedly took place right at the corner of David Jacob van Lennep's house Huis te Manpad, where the monument stands.
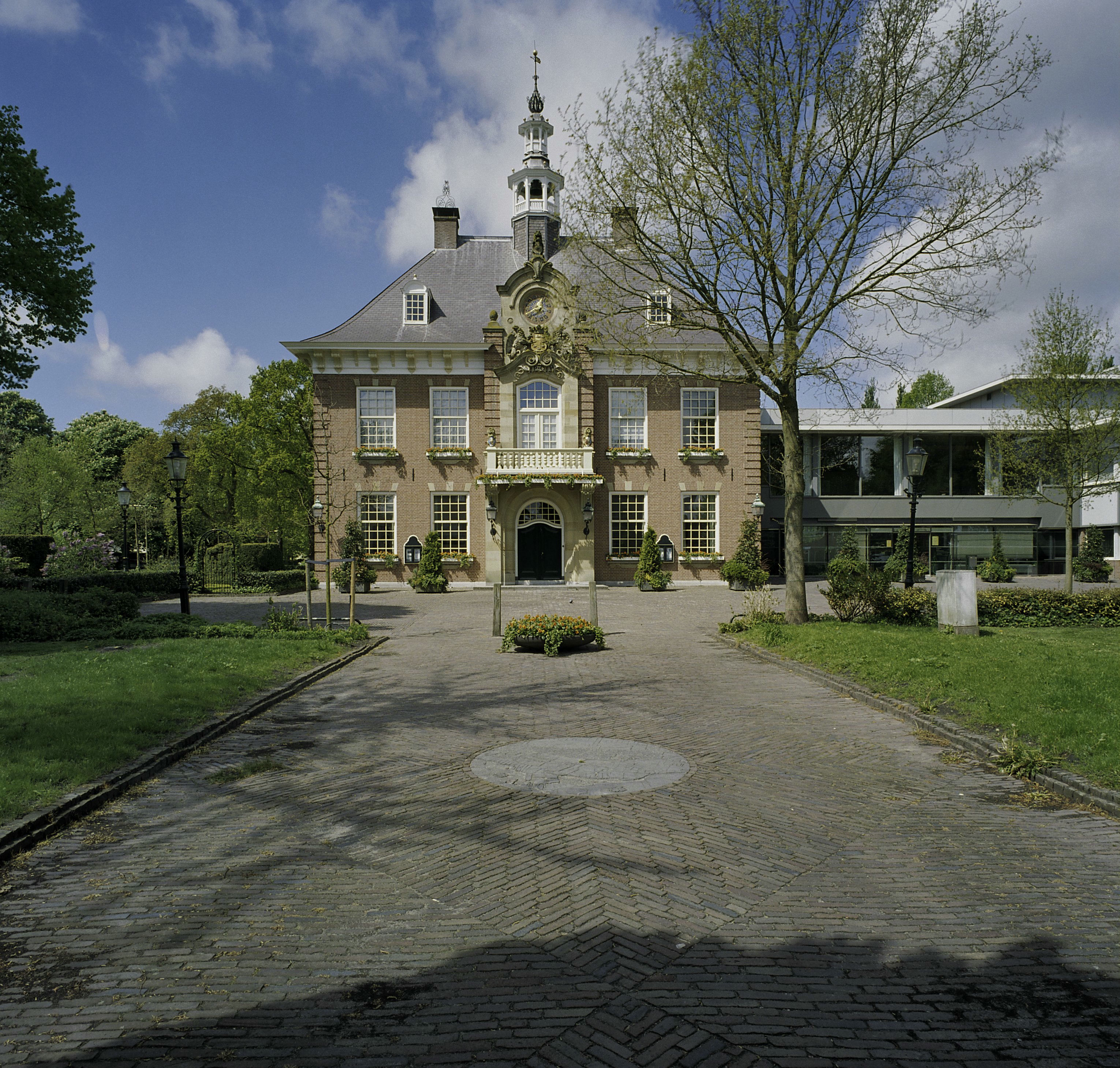
Town hall

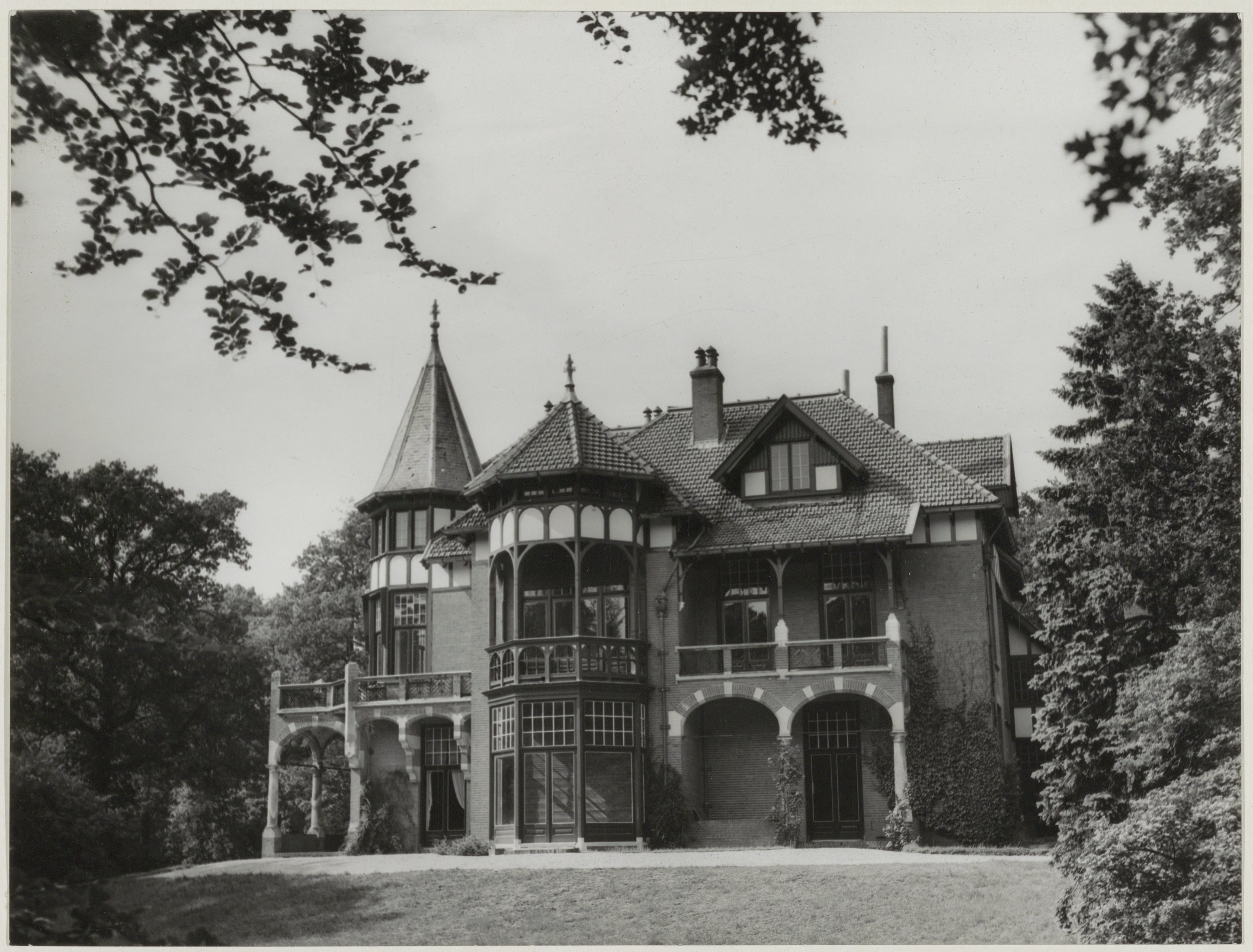
Villa Eikenrode, 1953

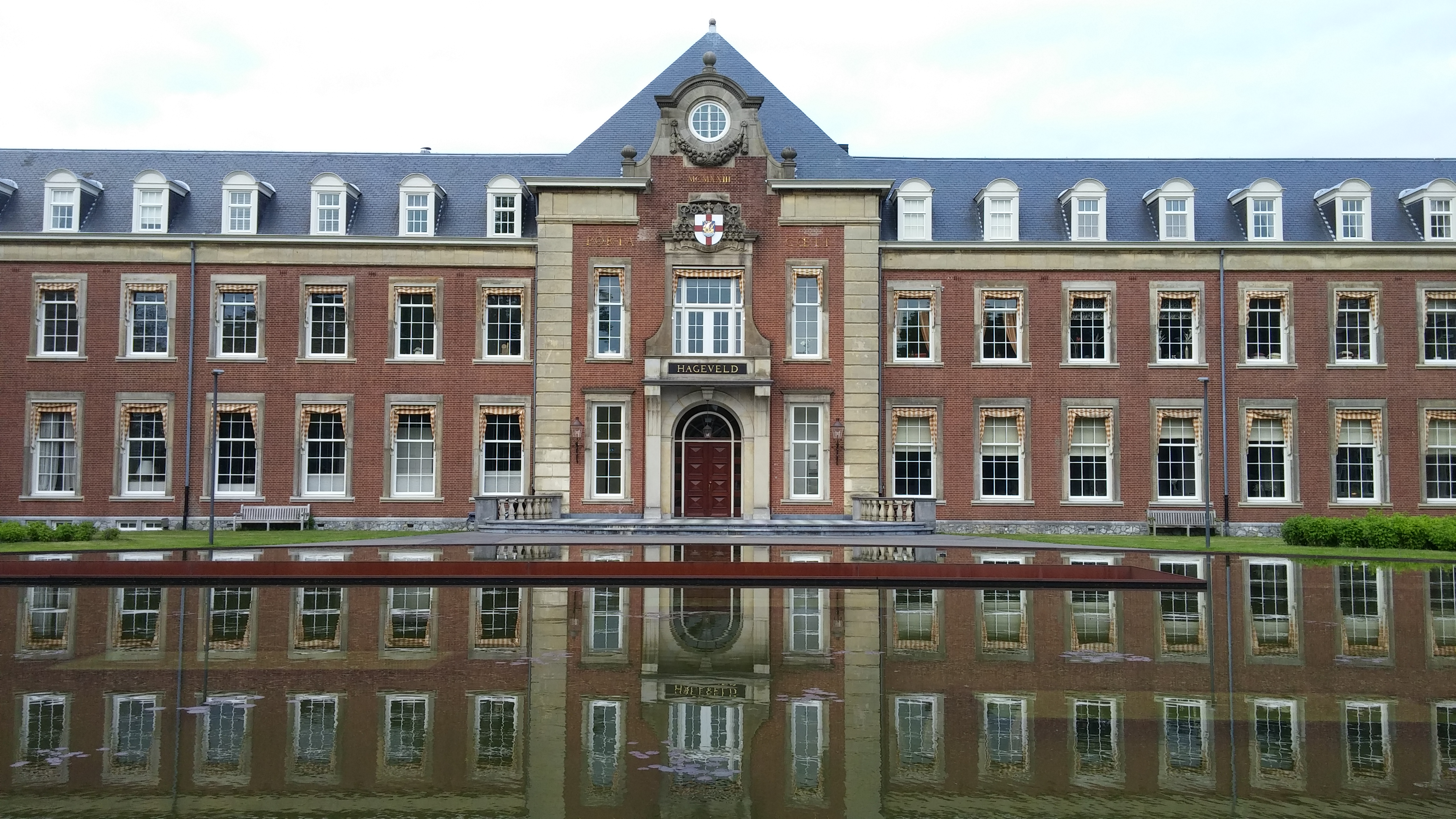
College Hageveld

== Transport ==
The town is served by Heemstede-Aerdenhout railway station, which lies on the Oude Lijn between Haarlem and Leiden.

== Local government ==
The municipal council of Heemstede consists of 21 seats, which at the 2026 municipal election were divided as follows:

- D66, 5 seats
- VVD, 5 seats
- GroenLinks / PvdA, 4 seats
- Heemsteeds Burger Belang (HBB), 4 seats
- CDA, 2 seats
- SamenSterkHeemstede 1 seat

== Notable residents ==
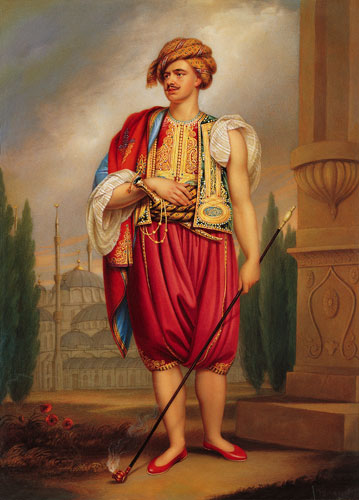
Portrait of Thomas Hope in Turkish Costume, 1805

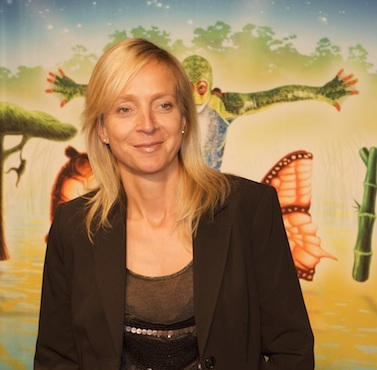
Floortje Dessing, 2010

- Adriaan Pauw (1585–1653) bought the town in 1621, Grand Pensionary of Holland 1631 to 1636
- Jan Hope (1737–1784) a banker, summered in his Groenendaal Park 1767 to 1784
- Christiaan van Pol (1752–1813) a flower painter and teacher
- Thomas Hope (1769–1830/1831) a Dutch and British merchant banker, author, philosopher and art collector
- Ivan Smirnov (1895–1956) a Russian WWI flying ace and naturalized Dutch aviator, lived in Heemstede 1936–1947
- Johan Limpers (1915–1944) sculptor and WWII resistance fighter
- Jan Knappert (1927–2005) an Esperantist and expert on the Swahili language
- Pieter Kooijmans (1933–2013) politician, jurist and diplomat
- Jan Gmelich Meijling (1936–2012) a politician and naval officer
- Els Moor (1937–2016) was a Dutch-born Surinamese educator, editor and book publisher
- Astrid Schulz (1939–2012) a model and actress, Playboy Playmate of the Month in September 1964
- Gijs Kuenen (born 1940) a microbiologist and academic
- Mieke Bal (born 1946) a cultural theorist, video artist and academic
- Joost Swarte (born 1947) a cartoonist and graphic designer
- Dick Maas (born 1951) a film director, screenwriter and film producer
- Floortje Dessing (born 1970) a radio and TV presenter, producer and travel writer
- Thierry Baudet (born 1983) a politician and leader of the Forum for Democracy
- Julian Ras (Dutch Wikipedia) (born 2001) an actor

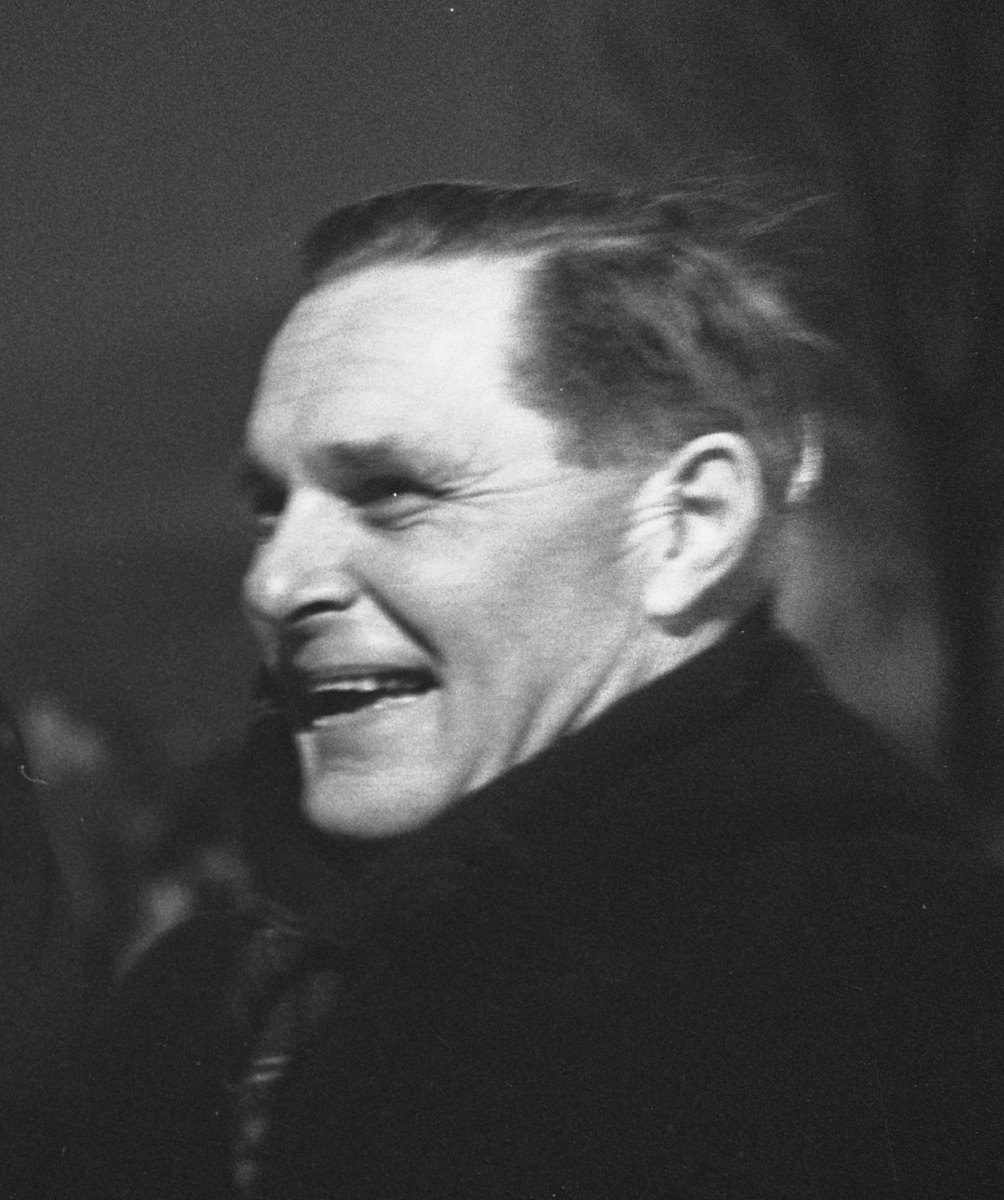
Roepie Kruize, 1969

=== Sport ===
- Joop van Dort (1889–1967) a footballer, team bronze medallist at the 1920 Summer Olympics
- Roepie Kruize (1925–1992) a field hockey player and coach, team bronze medallist at the 1948 Summer Olympics and team silver medallist at the 1952 Summer Olympics
- Johan Neeskens (born 1951 – 2024) a footballer with 480 club caps and manager
- Annemieke Fokke (born 1967) a Dutch field hockey player, team bronze medallist at the 1988 Summer Olympics
- Jeroen Bleekemolen (born 1981) a professional racing driver
- Frank Korpershoek (born 1984) a professional footballer, 351 caps with SC Telstar
- Vincent Regeling (born 1997) a professional footballer

== Image gallery ==
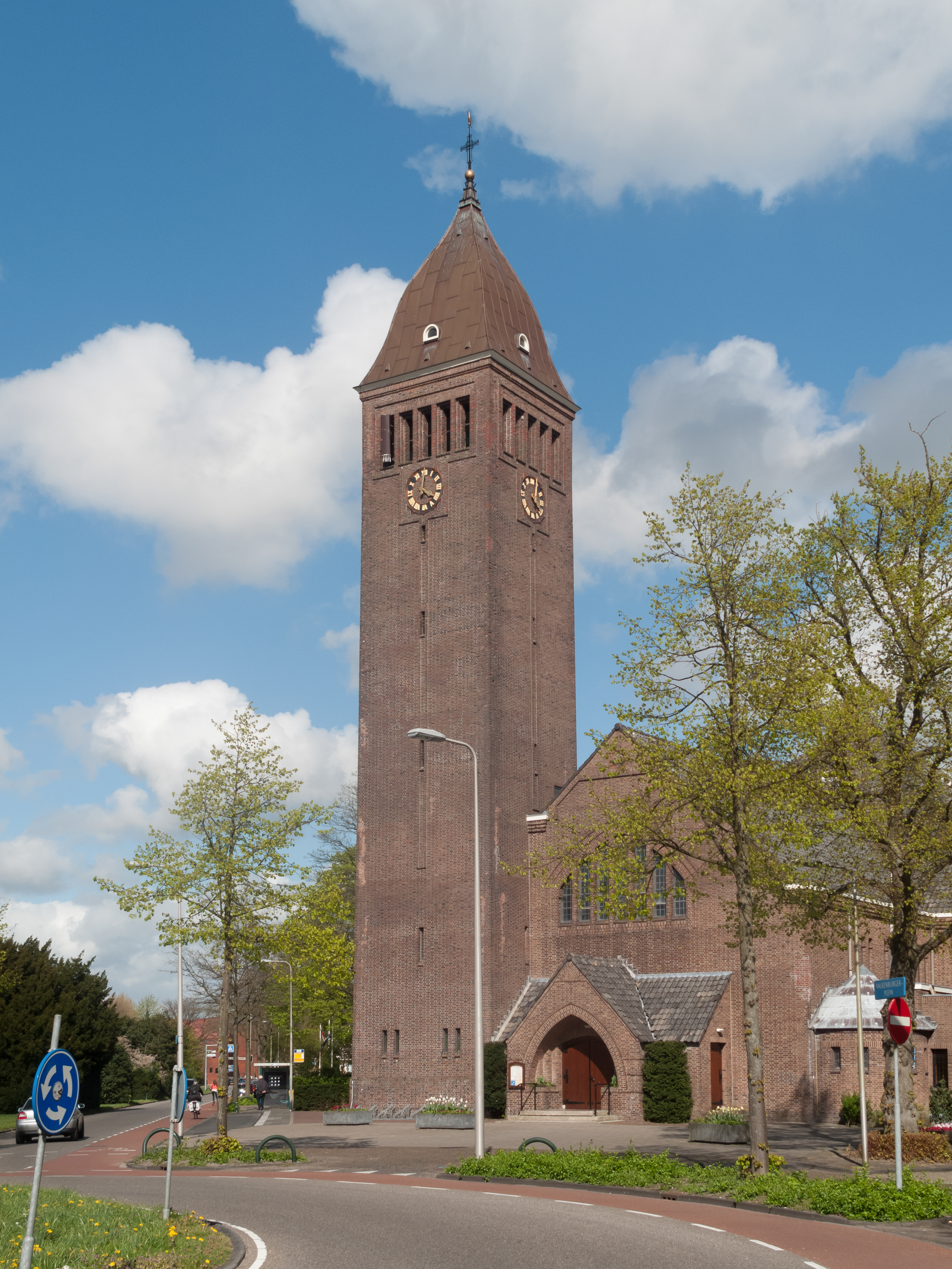
Church: Onze Lieve Vrouw Hemelvaartskerk

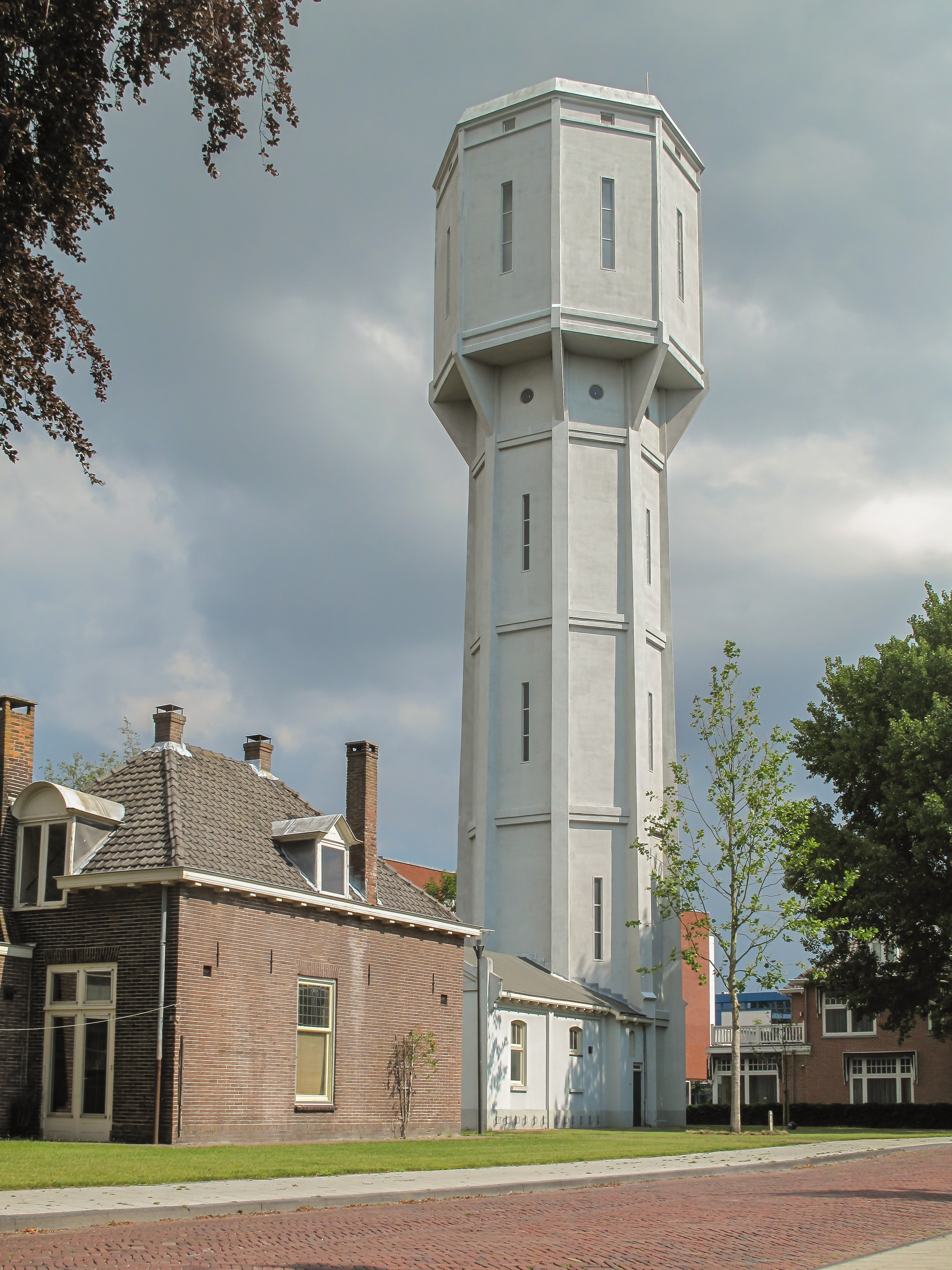
Watertower

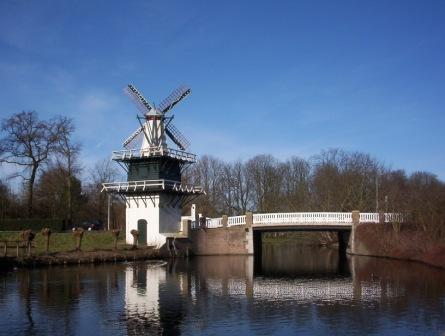
Windmill, Groenendaal landmark

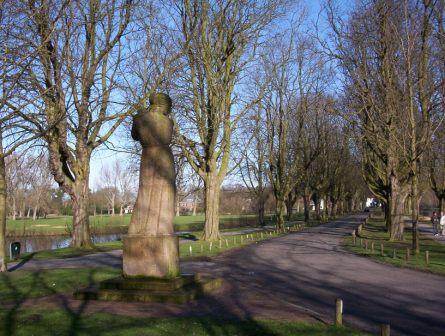
Freedom statue by Andriessen

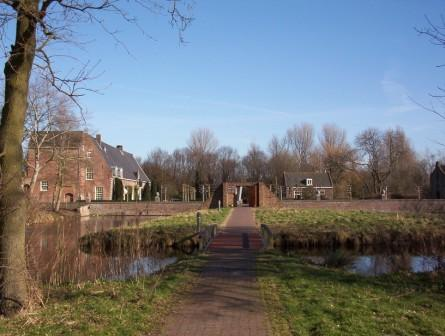
Oude Slot, site of the former Castle of Heemstede

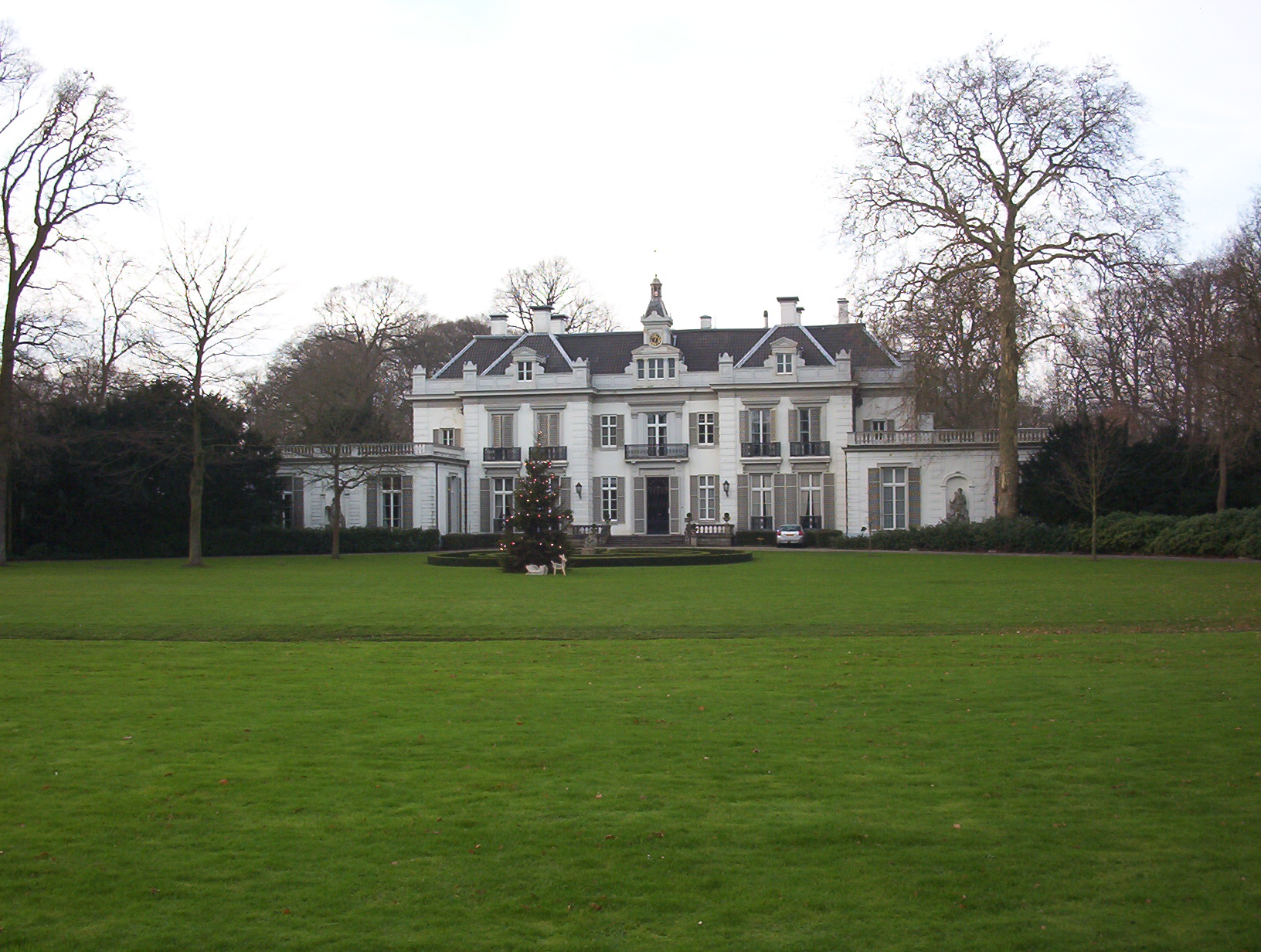
Hartekamp, Heemstede

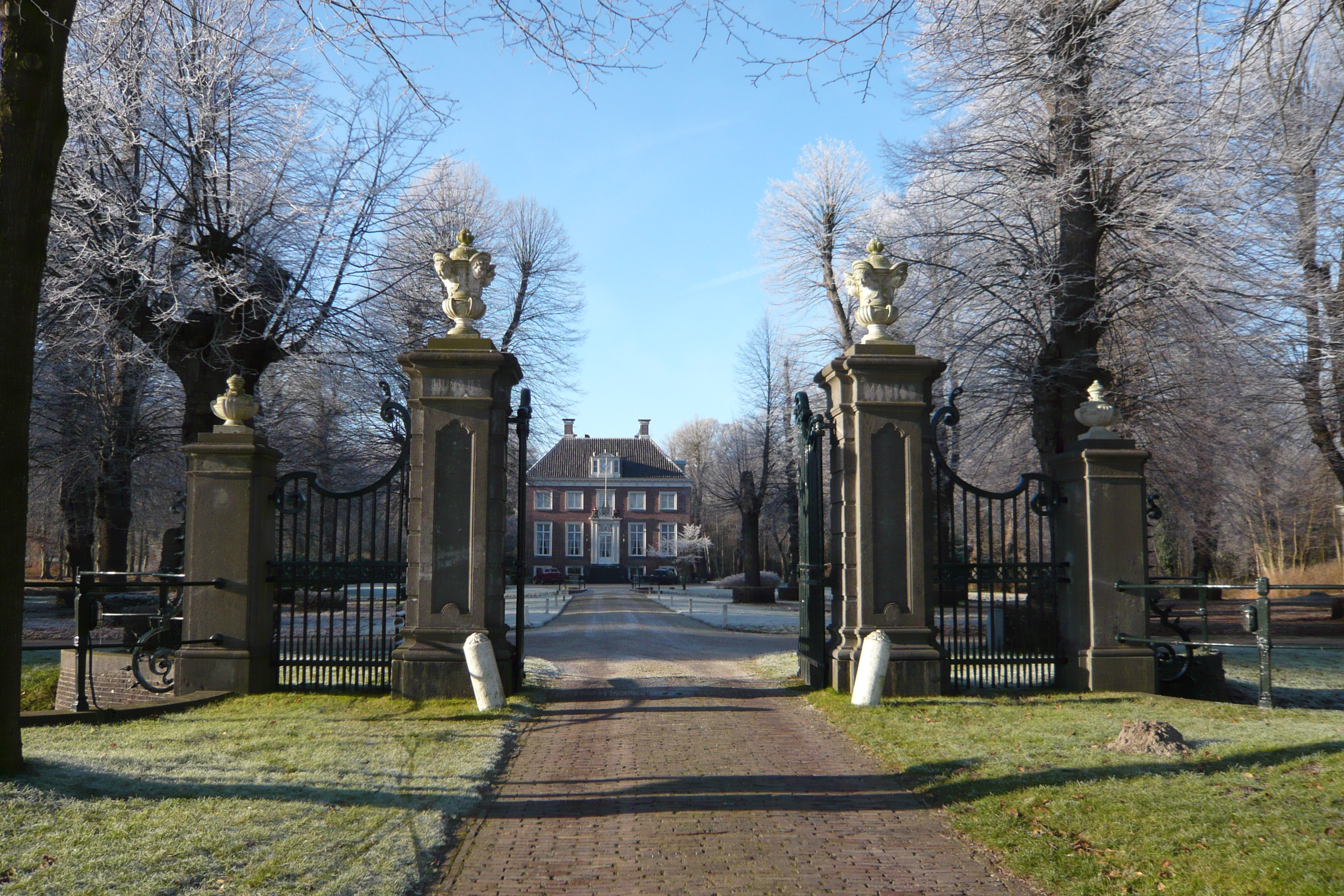
Countryhouse: Huys te Manpad

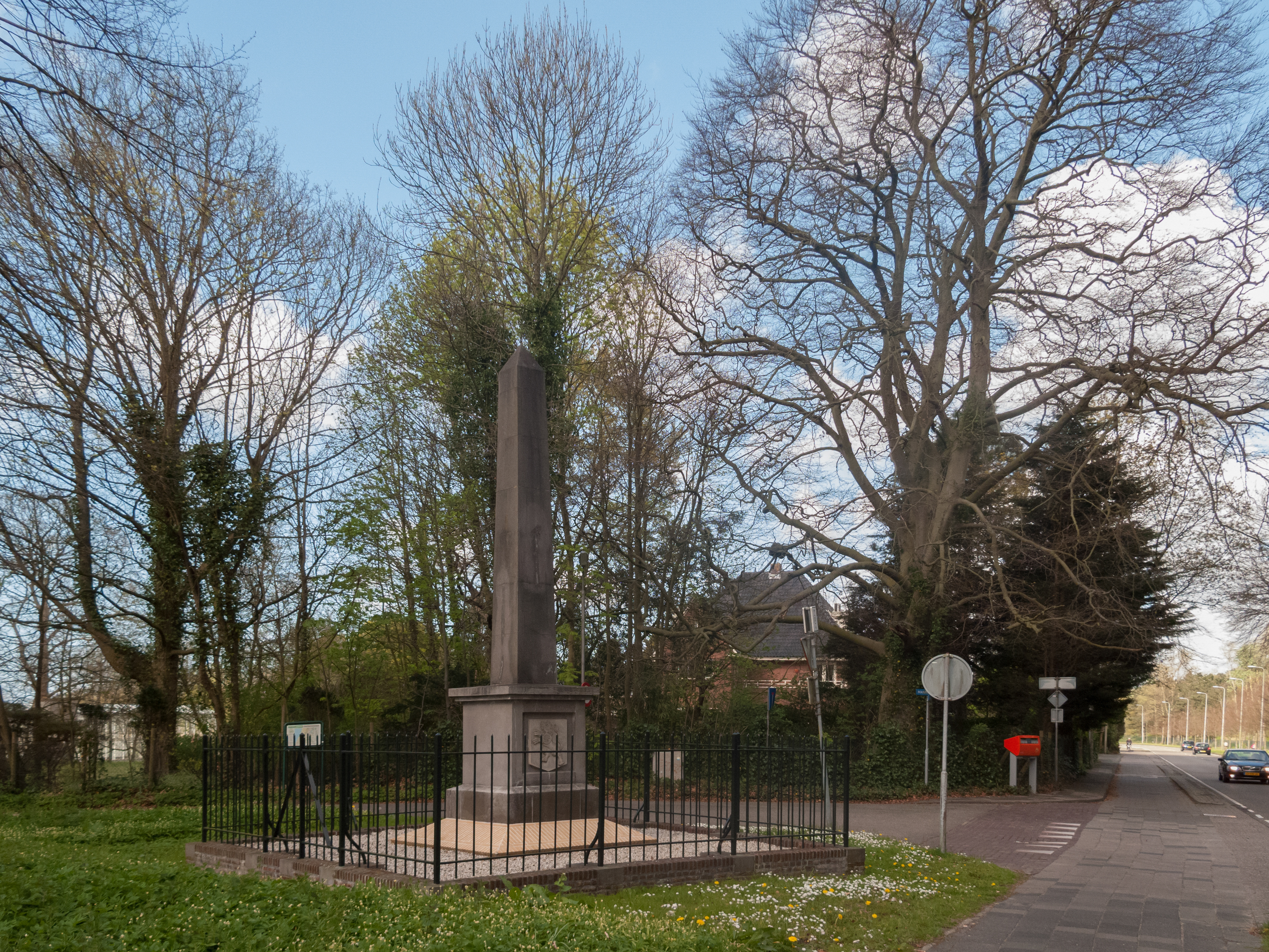
De Naald memorial near Herenweg-Manpadslaan
