= Adriaan van der Hoop =

Dutch banker (1778–1854)

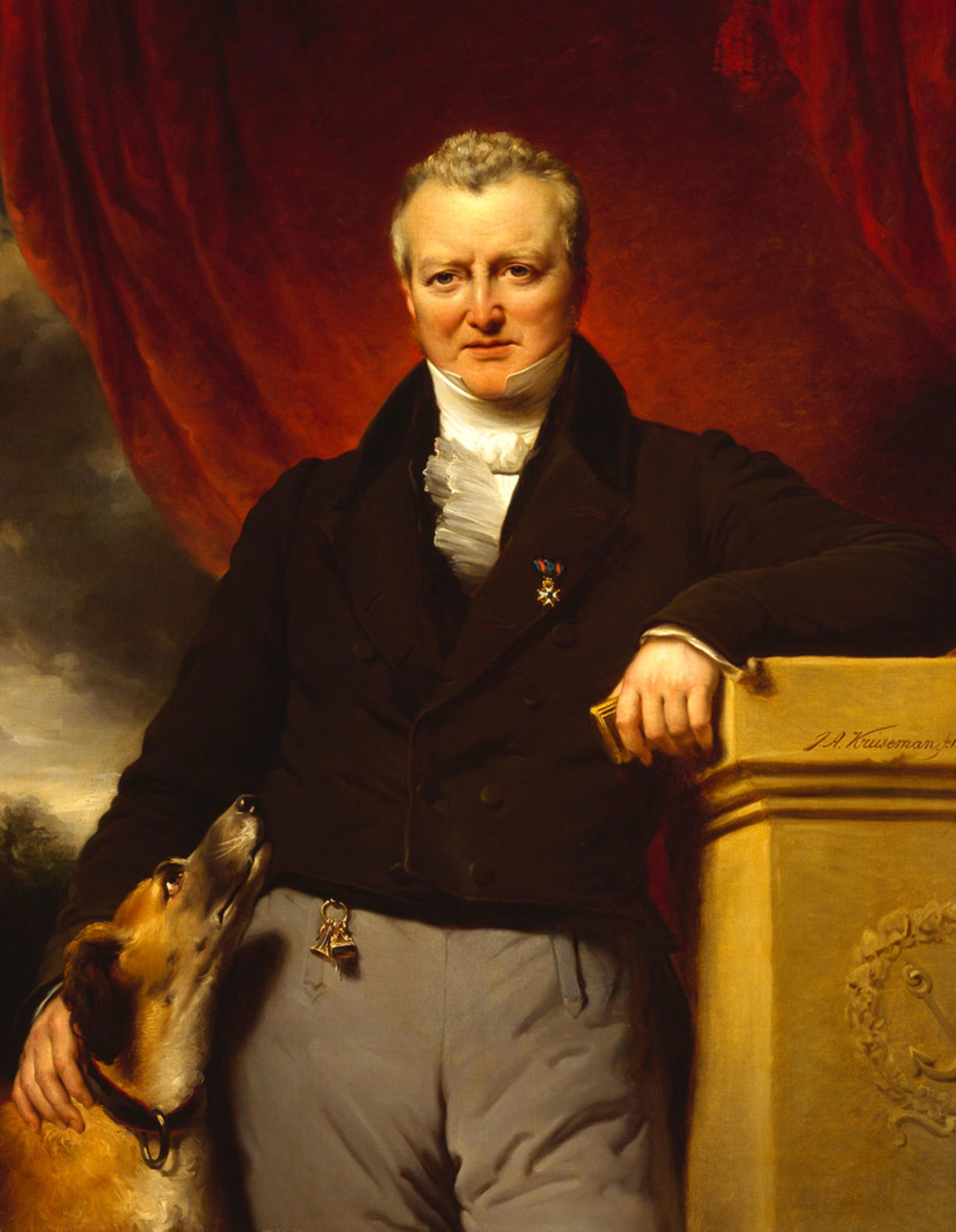
Portrait by Jan Adam Kruseman

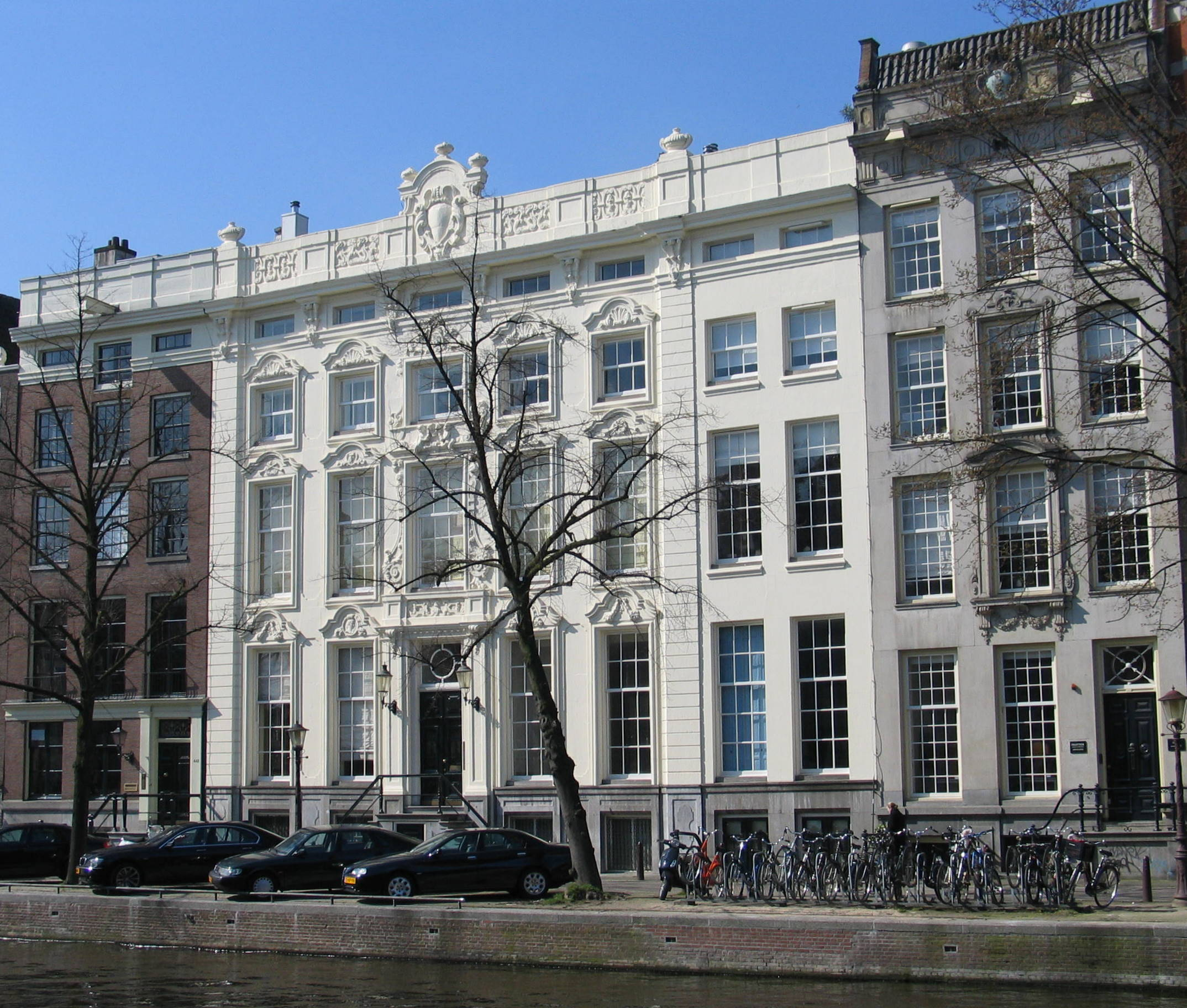
The former mansion of Adriaan van der Hoop on Keizersgracht (the white one)

Adriaan van der Hoop (28 April 1778, in Amsterdam – 17 March 1854, in Amsterdam) was a Dutch banker and in the first half of the 19th century one of the richest men in the Netherlands. He also was an influential politician: a member of the city council, the States-Provincial in Haarlem and the Senate in The Hague. In his later years he became an important art and plant collector. On his death he left 250 paintings to the city of Amsterdam, who could barely pay the inheritance tax. In this way Van der Hoop contributed substantially to the collection of the Rijksmuseum.

== Life ==
Adriaan van der Hoop was the son of Joan Cornelis van der Hoop, secretary of the Sociëteit van Suriname, prosecutor for the Admiralty of Amsterdam and Minister of the Navy. Adriaan studied law in Groningen and Kiel, when it was still a Danish city. (N.B. Holland was occupied by the French army between 1795 – 1813). With his Danish passport he traveled through Germany and England. In 1811, he was hired by the firm Hope & Co., for years an important lender to the Russian state.

Back in Holland in 1814 Adriaan van der Hoop was involved in the setting up of the Constitution and accompanied emperor Alexander I of Russia on his visit to Holland. In 1815, he was appointed by Alexander Baring to lead the firm Hope & Co. A debt of 100,000 guilder owed by his brother-in-law Jan Clifford led in 1819 to a drawn-out court case between the two men. The day after the verdict, four years later, Clifford committed suicide with a pistol.

Adriaan raised rare plants on his country estate Spaarnberg, near Santpoort. There he grew 120 kinds of South African Erica; he had two blossoming agaves and ten kinds of orchids. The country house was designed by Jan David Zocher, who on van der Hoop's request also designed a new stock exchange in Amsterdam.

Adriaan owned racehorses and in 1832 he started to collect art objects on a large scale. Adriaan bought works by contemporary painters, including Jan Adam Kruseman, Johannes Christianus Schotel and Barend Cornelis Koekkoek. His collection of paintings - which he had partly inherited, included items by Vermeer, Ruisdael, Rembrandt, Jan Steen and Adriaen van der Werff, and could be visited by appointment at his house on Keizersgracht 444. He had bought this house in 1822. The building on the Keizersgracht had been the offices of his employer Hope & Co., and had previously been inhabited by Hope & Co. family members Thomas Hope, his brother Adrian Hope, his cousin Henry Hope (who moved next door to 448), and later Thomas' son Jan Hope.

== Musée Van der Hoop ==
After his death, the Van der Hoop Museum was opened in his former home on the Keizersgracht and various catalogs were produced 1858-1872 in Dutch and French. In 1885 the collection was merged with the newly built Rijksmuseum.
