= Thomas Hope (banker, born 1704) =

Dutch banker

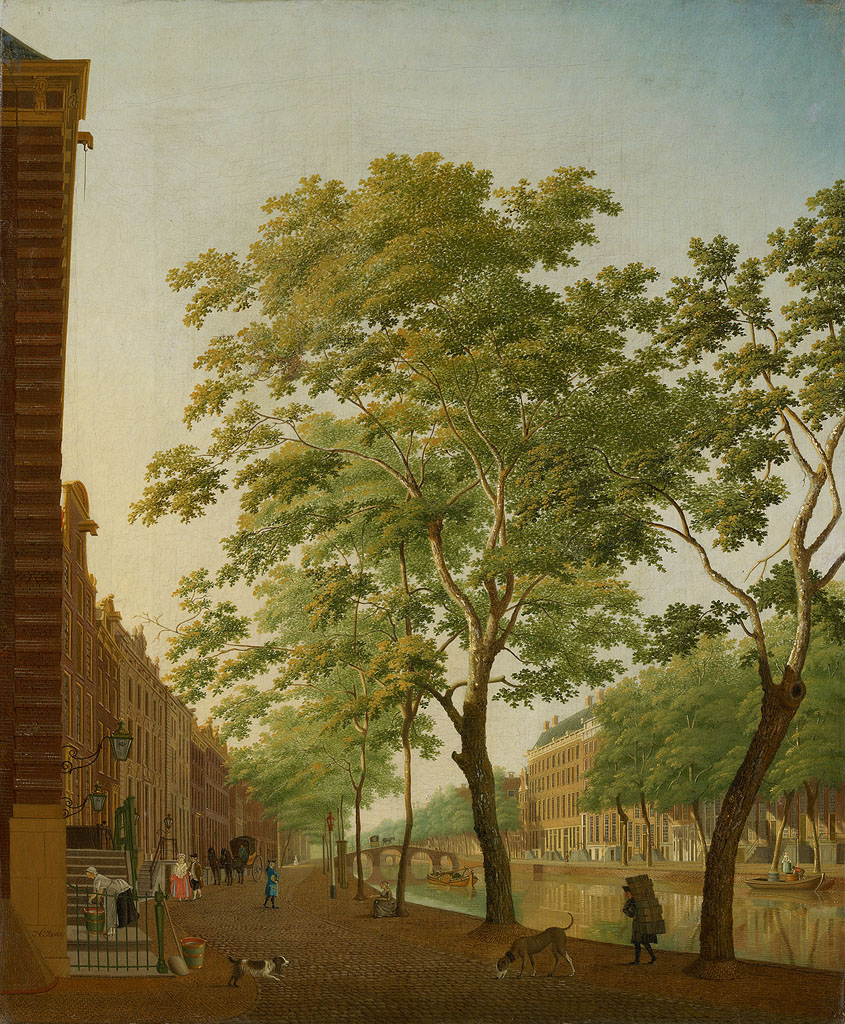
Keizersgracht with the mansion of Thomas Hope by Hendrik Keun

Thomas Hope (1704, Rotterdam – 26 December 1779, Amsterdam) was a successful and gifted Dutch banker in the 18th century. He is considered as the main author of a proposal to the States-General and the Admiralty to improve Holland's diminishing trade position through abolition of the export tax and lowering import tax. In 1752 he was the main investor in the VOC. As a Quaker - rejecting war and violence - and dissenter he was not allowed to official governmental jobs, but in 1756 at the beginning of the Seven Years' War he joined the Presbyterians and was appointed as manager by Anne of Hanover. In 1762 he founded Hope & Co. In 1766 he was representing the stadtholder in all the chambers of the VOC. Adam Smith dedicated the fourth edition of his Inquiry into the Nature and Causes of the Wealth of Nations (1776) to Thomas Hope.

== Family ==
The Hope family originally came from Scotland and was related to Thomas Hope from Craighall Castle. Around 1660 members settled in Rotterdam. Archibald Hope, the father of Thomas, had eight sons. Archibald – along with sons John and Henry – played a principal part in stock trade in South Sea Bubble. Archibald Jr. and his brother Thomas moved to Amsterdam. His second eldest son Henry (later father of Henry Hope) went to seek riches in the United States around 1730. Younger sons Isaac and Zacharias remained in Rotterdam, where, as ship-owners, they organized the 1735 transatlantic crossing by the Swiss Mennonite emigrants to Pennsylvania.

== Life ==
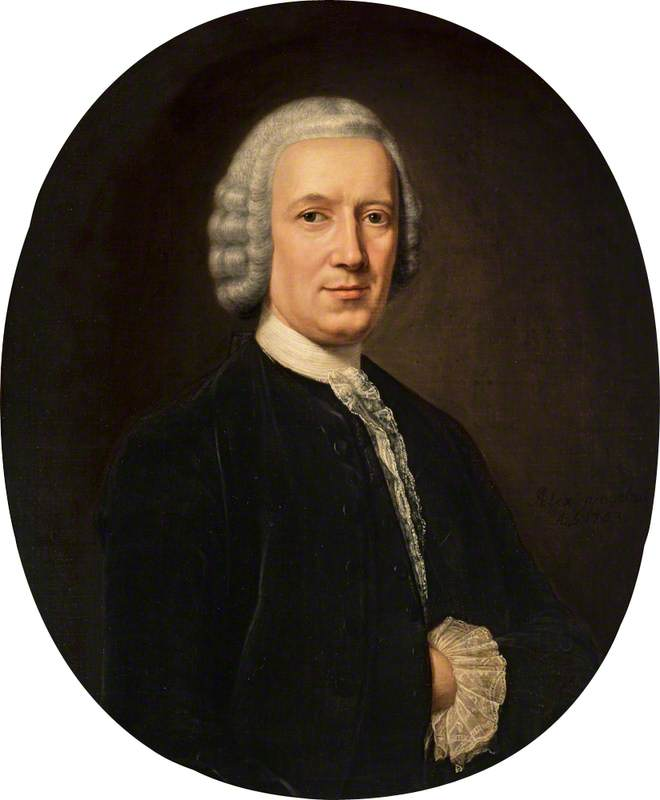
Portrait of Adrian Hope by Cosmo Alexander (1763)

After the economic bubble of 1720, Thomas' older brother Archibald jr (1698-1734) founded the trade, shipping and banking house, when he tried his luck by opening a branch of his fathers banking house Hopes in Amsterdam. In those early years he simply lodged with a uncle and spent his days at the Amsterdam exchange. He was clearly successful, because Thomas joined him and was given power of attorney in 1724. When Archibald married they opened an office in 1726, and the next year Thomas married the daughter of a well-to-do Amsterdam merchant, Margaretha van Marcelis. In 1730 he joined the Mennonite church. In 1734, when Archibald jr died, Thomas was joined by his youngest brother Adrian (1709-1781). In 1737 Thomas became the father of Jan Hope.

In 1750/1751 he represented the stadtholder in the VOC until his appointment was reverted by the city council after the death of William IV of Orange when the orangists were defeated. Thomas Hope is considered as the main author of the Proposition: a proposal to improve Holland's diminishing trade position with Hamburg through abolition of the export tax and lowering import tax (limited porto franco). The proposal from August 1751 did not take up considerable time on the agenda, but was enacted by other countries. In 1752 Thomas became a member of the "Lords XVII", the managers of the VOC. Thomas Hope came up with a system of cost calculation and prompted the reorganization of the China tea trade? Four years later he was the main participant in the VOC. Anne of Hanover invited Thomas to play a prominent role as her representative with the VOC. and in 1766 he became the spokesperson for William V of Orange, the formal head of the VOC. In 1770 Thomas retired because of a stroke; the doctor Jacob van Ghesel visited him 126 times. He passed his responsibilities to his only son John, who remained with the VOC and Hope & Co. until his death.

The business became successful in trade with Virginia supporting sugar, indigo and tobacco plantations and slave trade with the West Indies, (Sint Eustatius). The company lent money to plantations in the West Indies, thus facilitating the slave trade in several ways. The Hope brothers' business affairs (like those of many others) flourished for many reasons, including the handling of loans to Frederick the Great during the Seven Years' War. In 1759, the Hope business had 26 co-workers. In 1758, Thomas bought Mattheus Lestevenon's (then Dutch ambassador in France) attractive building at Keizersgracht 444-446. The next-door house at 448 was bought in 1763 for Henry Hope, the nephew from America and trained at Harman and Co. for several years. Thomas had one son, Jan Hope, who was about the same age as Henry. Together they would continue to build the Hopes name internationally. During the Amsterdam banking crisis of 1763 many Amsterdam businesses went bust when the Brothers De Neufville could not pay their creditors, resulting in an international financial crisis, but Hope & Co. continued to flourish through international loans and share dealing, until the credit crisis of 1772.

== Sources ==
- Elias, J.E., De vroedschap van Amsterdam 1578-1795, 2 volumes, Amsterdam, 1903-1905 KNAW
- The slavery history of historical predecessors of ABN AMRO An investigation into Hope & Co. and R. Mees & Zoonen (2022)
