= The Drunken Couple =

Painting by the Dutch painter Jan Steen

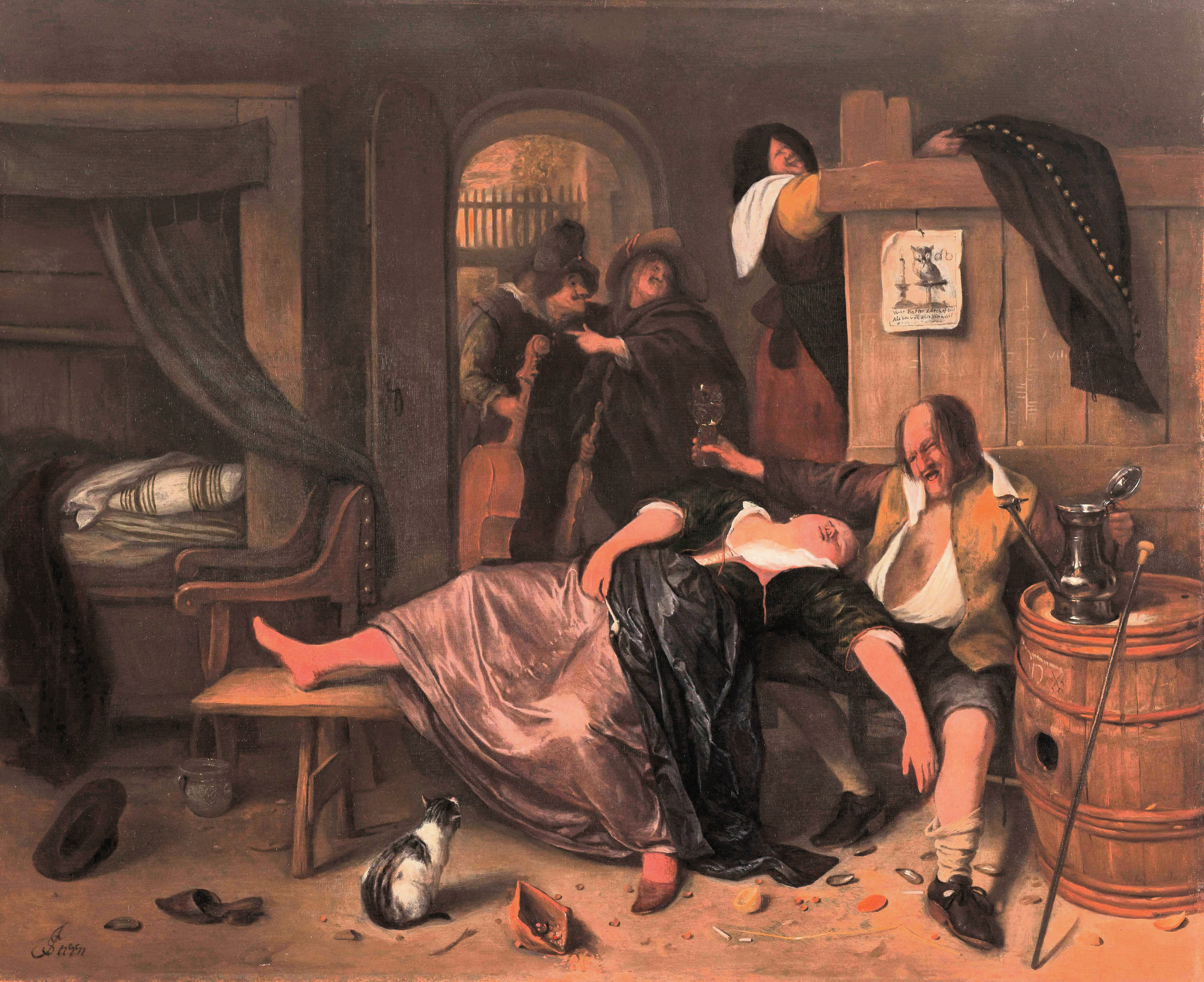
- Artist: Jan Steen
- Year: c. 1655–1665
- Medium: Oil on panel
- Dimensions: 52.5 cm × 64 cm (20.7 in × 25 in)
- Location: Rijksmuseum, Amsterdam

The Drunken Couple is an oil-on-oak-panel painting by Jan Steen, painted c.1655–1665 and now in the Rijksmuseum in Amsterdam. It depicts a drunken couple so inebriated that they are completely unaware of the intruders skulking in the background. The theme is reinforced by the print of an owl above their heads; in the 17th century the owl was a metaphor for being stupid and blind, reputedly not able to see in the daytime.

Adriaan van der Hoop donated it and the rest of his collection to the city of Amsterdam in 1854. It was initially assigned to the Museum van der Hoop before being moved to its present home on 30 June 1885.
