= De Kleine Komedie =

Theatre in Amsterdam, Netherlands

Coordinates: 52°22′00.5″N 4°53′46″E

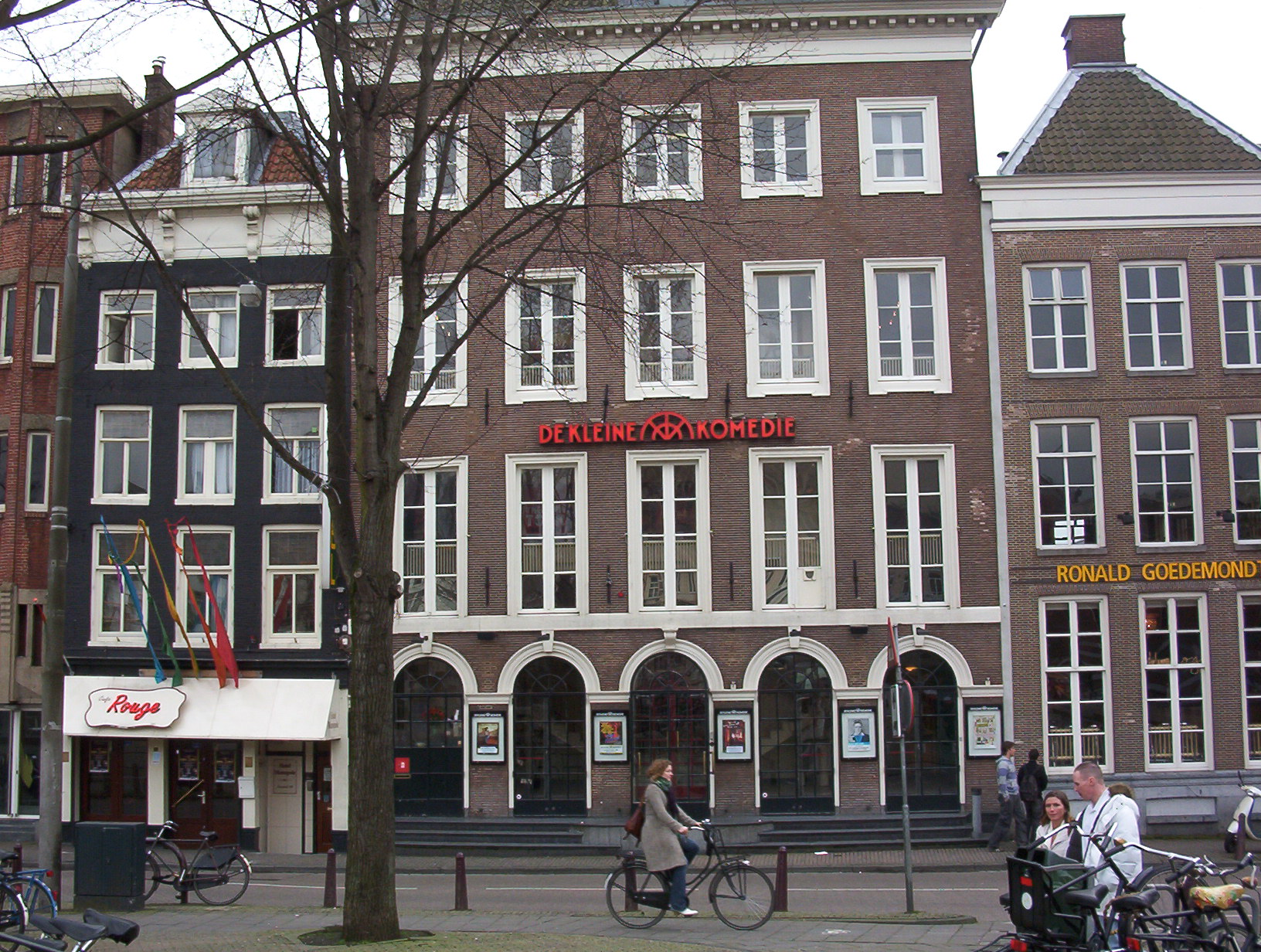
De Kleine Komedie

De Kleine Komedie is today the oldest theatre in Amsterdam, dating from 1788. Situated on the Amstel near the Halvemaansteeg, the building offers a stage for both upcoming and established Dutch talents. The theatre has 503 seats.

== History of the building ==
The first theatre built in Amsterdam was the Schouwburg of Van Campen on Keizersgracht 384 in 1637, which burned down in 1772. That theatre company then moved to the Leidseplein, where it built a theatre in 1774, the first Stadsschouwburg. That building burned down in 1892 (the present building was built in 1894), making De Kleine Komedie the oldest surviving theatre in Amsterdam.

In 1784 Henry Hope of Hope & Co. purchased ground on the Amstel near the east side of the Halvemaansteeg in Amsterdam, together with his fellow banker friends Balthazar Elias Abbema, Pieter de Smeth, Henry Fizeaux, Jean Alexander Botereau, and Pieter Muilman. They commissioned the building to the architect Abraham van der Hart who completed it in 1788. The commissioners were all very influential men of Amsterdam who had far reaching connections. Henry Fizeaux was a banker who had close ties with John Adams and Benjamin Franklin. He tried to raise funds for the American cause and shared revolutionary sympathies, though merchant tradition was to deny political preferences. The 'Patriotic' or 'Anti-Orange' sympathies of the directors Henry Fizeaux and Jean Alexander Botereau resulted in their stepping down in 1787 when the House of Orange was re-established. Orangist Henry Hope took over the running of the establishment until he fled the country before Napoleon's army in 1794.

=== Théâtre Français ===
It was called the Théâtre Français sur l'Erwtemarkt in 1794, the year performances began. In those days, the performances were often in French and modelled on a Parisian theater form that was very popular. Napoleon himself supported the Théâtre Français, and French opera's and plays were shown in the theatre well into the 19th century.

When the interest in French plays decreased, the building was sold to the 'Neues Deutsches Theater' that performed German plays. In 1856 the building came into the hands of the Free Church of Scotland and was rechristened 'Scottish Missionary Church'. The driving force behind the Dutch branch of this church was the Rev. August Ferdinand Carl Schwartz (1817–1870), the father of the novelist Maarten Maartens.

When the Vrije Universiteit (Free University) of Amsterdam started in 1880, it hired some rooms in the Scottish Missionary Church and used them as lecture rooms. Here the founder Abraham Kuyper and his four co-professors gave their lectures. In 1883 the Scottish Missionary Church became too small for the quickly growing number of students and the university bought another building.

In the first half of Twentieth Century the building was called Salvatori and was used as a meeting centre. The most various groups met here, from orthodox Protestants to leftist freethinkers. During the Second World War the building was no more than a bicycle shed.

=== De Kleine Komedie ===
In 1947 the building was reopened as a theatre, now under its present name 'De Kleine Komedie'. Since then its program is primarily in Dutch. In the Fifties and Sixties many famous people in the Dutch entertainment world, like Toon Hermans, Wim Kan and Fons Jansen, made appearances in this theatre. In 1973 the building was closed by the Amsterdam fire brigade due to fire hazard. After a renovation financed by private sources, it was reopened in 1978.

In 1988 the continued existence of De Kleine Komedie was put in danger again, when the municipality of Amsterdam wanted to withdraw its subsidy. A campaign launched by the cabaret performer Youp van 't Hek secured the theatre's subsidy.

Because of its cosy atmosphere De Kleine Komedie is often used for try-out performances by upcoming talents as well as long-established cabaret performers. Many DVD and TV productions are recorded here.
