= Jan Hope =

Anglo-Dutch merchant and banker (1737–1784)

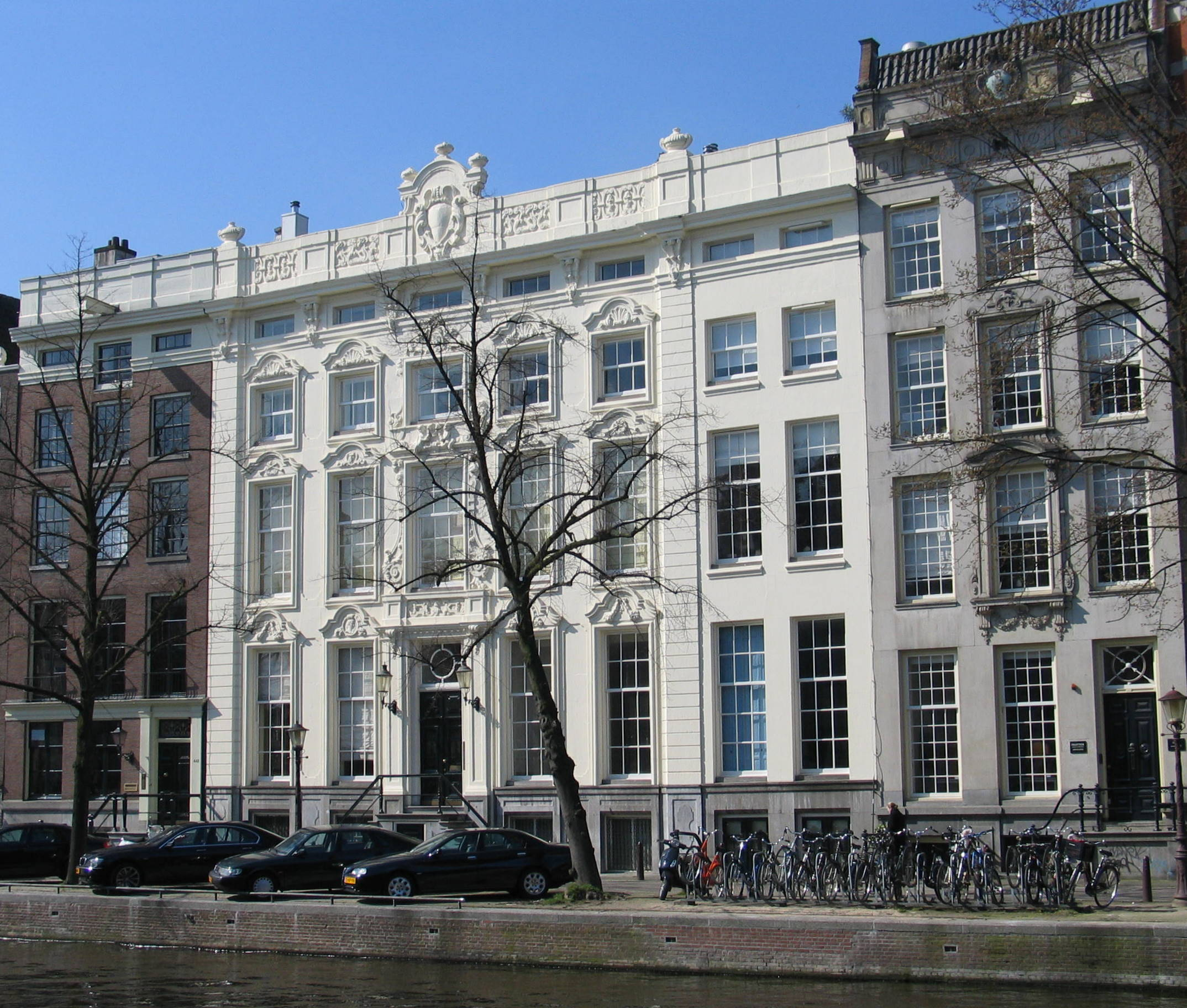
The family mansion and offices on Keizersgracht

John Hope (14 February 1737 – 20 April 1784), also known as Jan Hope, was a wealthy Dutch banker, participating in the Hope & Co. bank that his father had founded in 1762, a member of the city council and an art collector. In 1770 he was appointed as manager of the Dutch East India Company (VOC). He is also known today for his Groenendaal Park in Heemstede, where he summered on his estate. Shortly before he died he bought the nearby "Bosbeek". This estate became one of the first examples of a large garden in the 'English Style' in the Netherlands, and shaped by his second son Adrian Elias. His oldest son Thomas Hope became a designer of neoclassical interior decoration, and his youngest son Henry Philip Hope a gem collector and jewelry specialist (and owned the legendary Hope Diamond).

== Early years ==
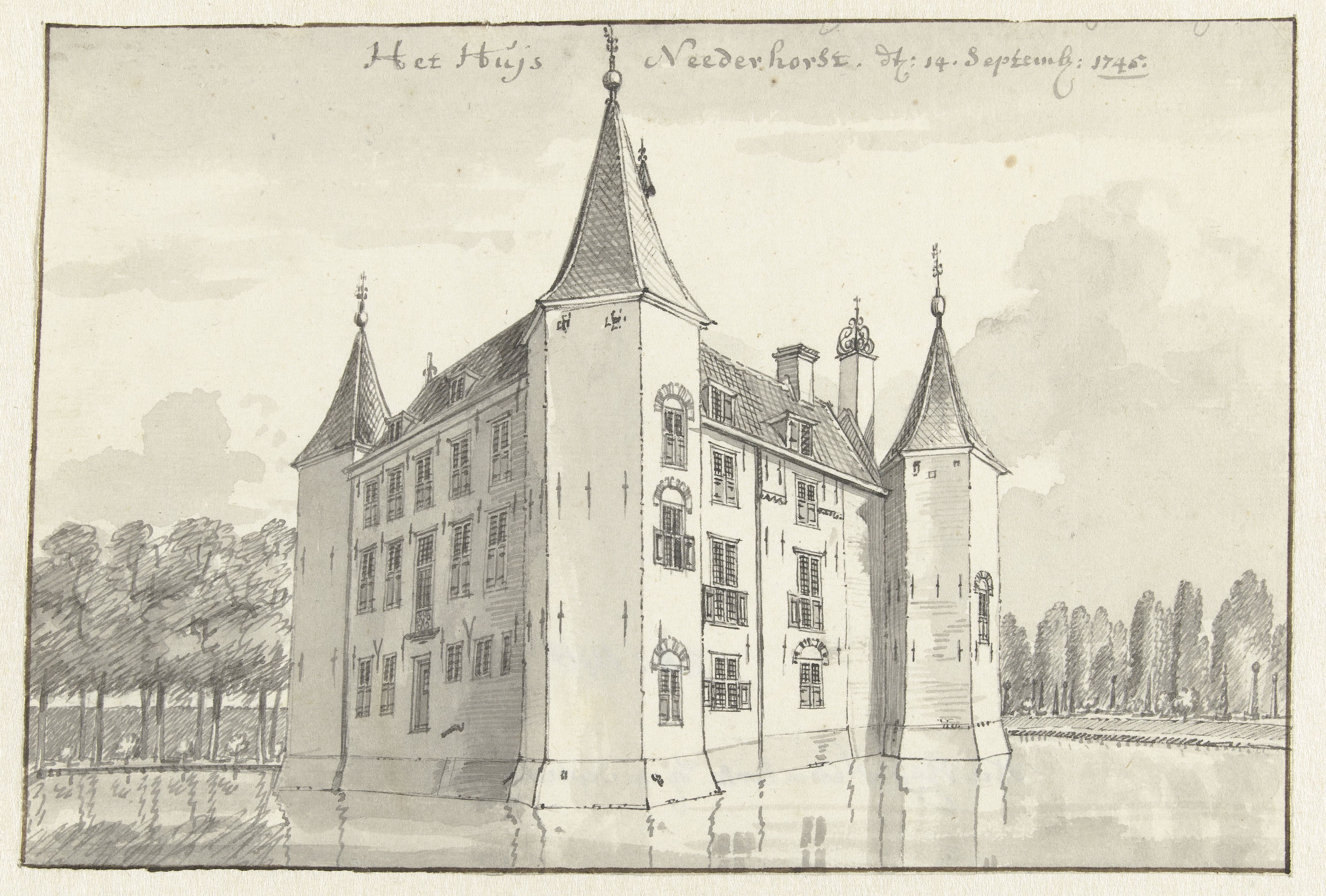
Kasteel Nederhorst in 1745, in Nederhorst den Berg

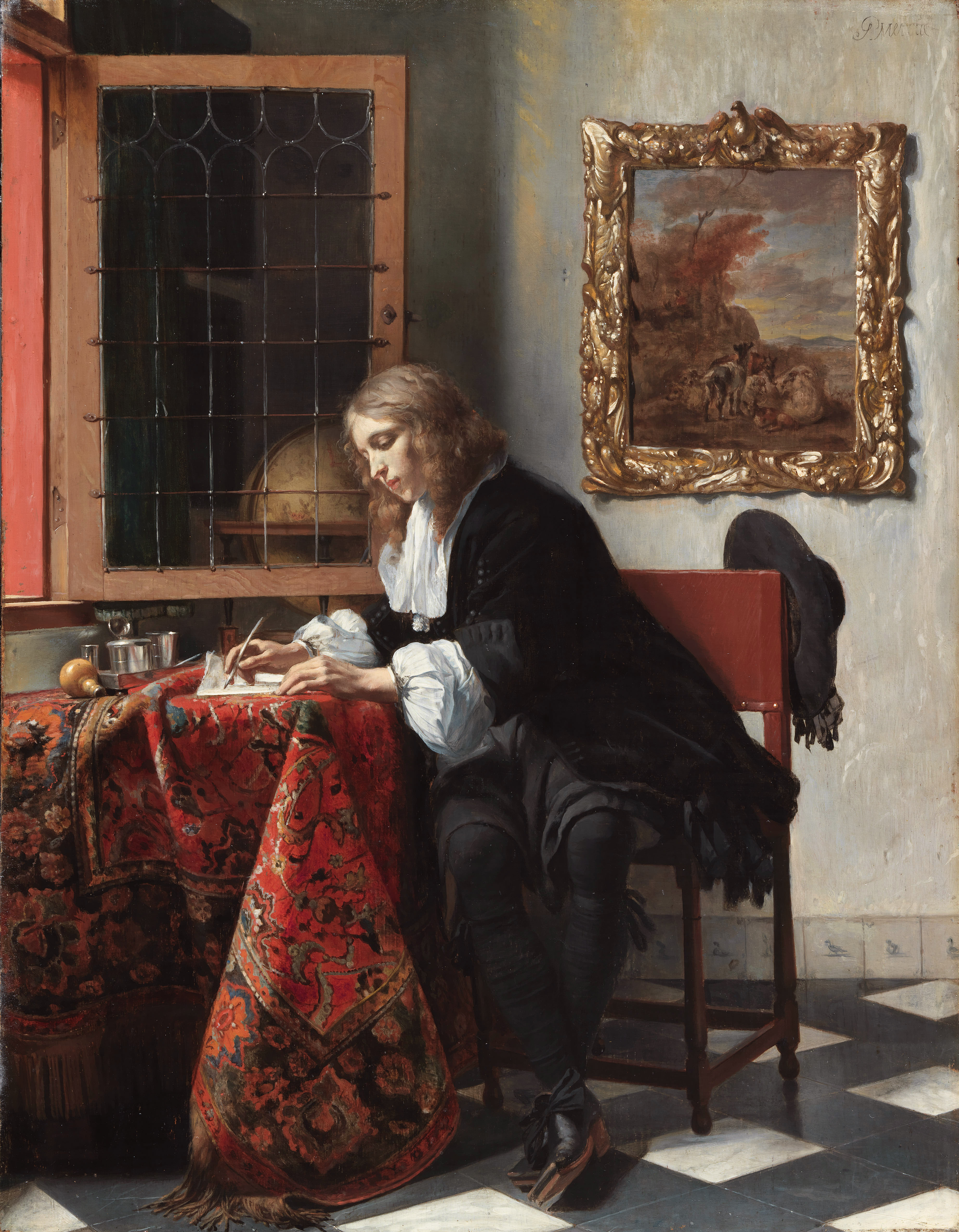
Man Writing a Letter was bought by Jan Hope in 1771 together with its pendant Woman Reading a Letter

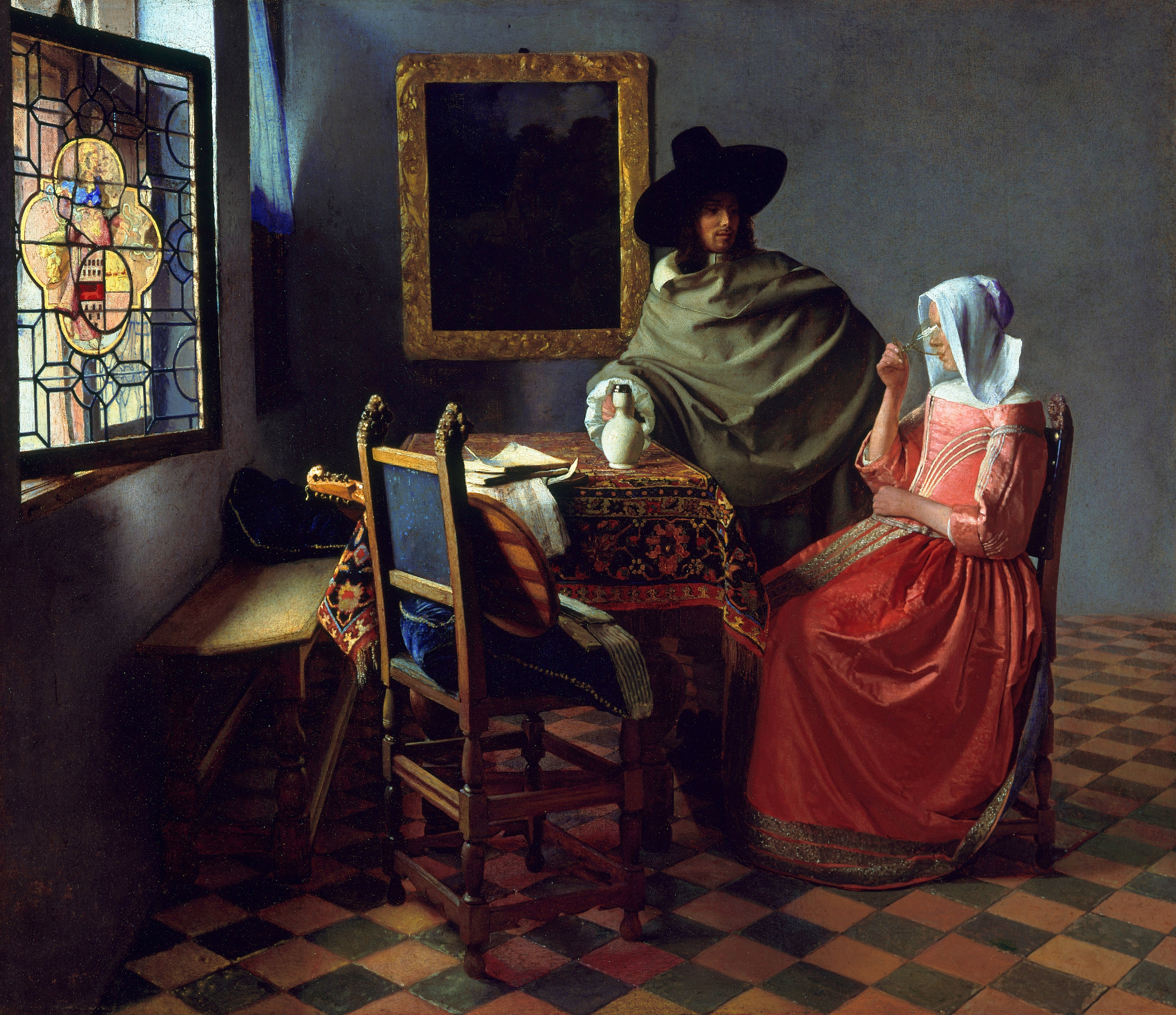
The Wine Glass bought by John Hope in 1774. Gemäldegalerie, Berlin

Jan was an only child, born in Amsterdam into the Hope trading, shipping and banking family. He was the son of Thomas Hope and Margaretha Marcelis. Baptized as Jan in the Mennonite church, he had himself re-baptized John in the presbyterian church at the age of 19. John Hope likely studied law; in 1760 he made a Grand Tour with his cousin Oliver to Italy and bought 24 drawings or etchings by Antonio Visentini. In Venice he met with James Watt. In 1761 he bought a mantelpiece designed by Piranesi.

In 1762 he and his cousin Henry Hope an apprentice at Harman and Co. was invited in the board of Hope & Co. John did not sign as he was travelling. In 1763 he married Philippina Barbara van der Hoeven (1738-1790), the daughter of a Rotterdam mayor, who also had a strong interest in art. The Hope Collection of Pictures was started by uncle Adrian and them.

In 1765 he was "schepen"; member of the Amsterdam city council between 1768 and 1777 and director of the Dutch Society of Science. Unlike his cousin and business partner Henry Hope, Jan wanted to participate in the fashionable Dutch societies that actively propagated the Scottish Enlightenment. Like his relatives John Hope (botanist) or John Hope (writer)? In the Dutch Society of Letters he was introduced by no other than the director himself, David Ruhnken. In 1774 he bought the castle Nederhorst, including a title. It was inherited by his sons, but the park and castle were hardly used or changed by them.

== Banking business ==
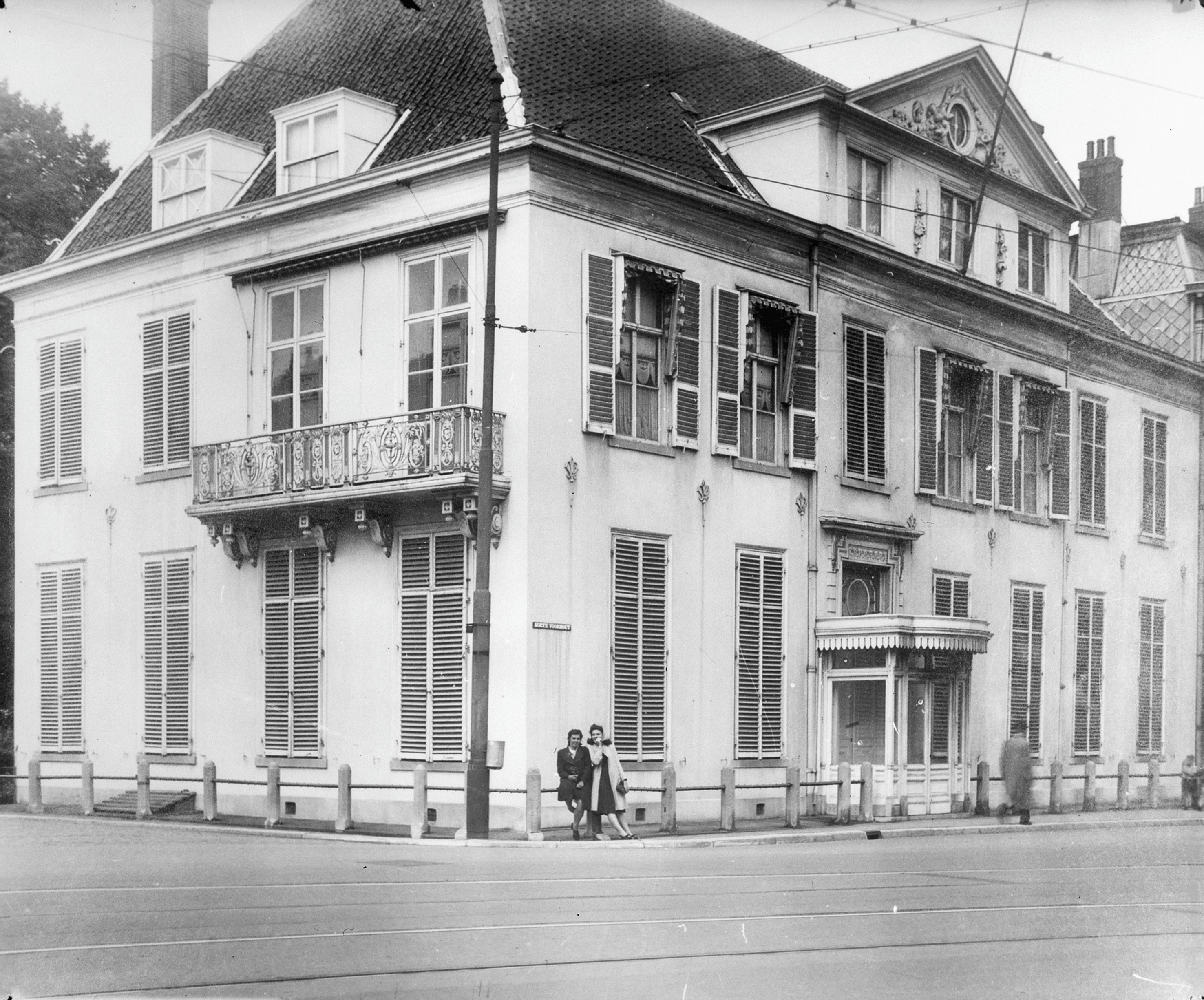
Korte Voorhout 8 where John Hope died?

In 1766 his father Thomas became the personal advisor to the stadtholder William V, and represented him in all the Chambers of the VOC. In 1767 the Hope bank collaborated with Sir Joshua Vanneck, 1st Baronet and his son. Hope bought Groenendaal near Heemstede. In 1770 John was appointed as one of the managers of the VOC when his father retired after a stroke. The Hope Company cooperated with Alexander Fordyce, and Harman and Co. in 1770.

Jan lived and worked in the Hope & Co. Amsterdam banking offices, but not very enthusiastically. Unlike his cousin, he was more interested in his estates, title and show. His cousin Henry humored him and let him expand the joint art collection, used to impress the clients (often foreign heads of state). John Hope owned a whole series of tables of the most varied types of stone, some of which had been excavated in his presence at the Villa Hadriana in Tivoli. In 1771 the company acquired a fine collection of paintings from two brothers in Rotterdam. In 1779 John inherited from his father half of the company, in 1781 Adrian's half went to Henry. Archibald Hope died without offspring; the heirs paid little inheritance tax, which was regarded as fraud. In 1780/1782 the company lend an enormous amount of money to the Gustav III and Charles III of Spain; John Hope bought the biggest mansion on Herengracht (509-511) and the family came into the possession of 25% of the shares in a porcelain manufacture started by Joannes de Mol. From 1774-1782 he represented Amsterdam in the States of Holland in the Hague. In 1784 he bought "Bosbeek". He died at Korte Voorhout; the bereaved moved to Heemstede.

== Parks ==
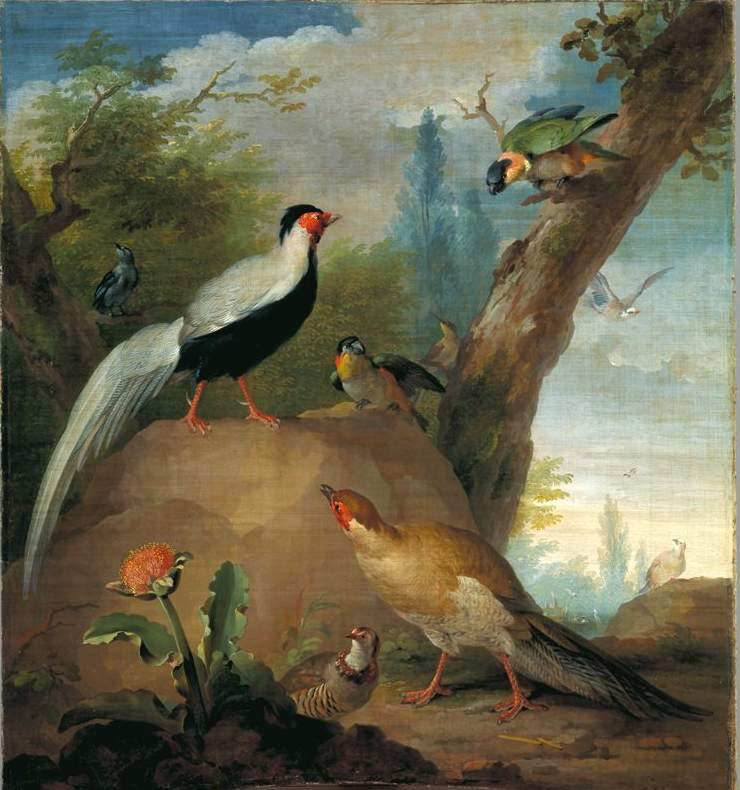
Keizersgracht 444-446: Overdoor by Aart Schouman

Jan and Philippina had three sons, Thomas Hope (1769–1831), Adrian Elias (1772-1834), and Henry Philip Hope (1774-1839). His son Adrian Elias embellished Groenendaal Park still further, building the Belvedere, a tower that stood for a century on the hill behind the "Vrijheidsbeeld" (deconstructed after WWII), and the "Walvisbank", a park bench made up of whale bones. Both of these can be seen on old postcards of Groenendaal park. The Hope cousins Jan and Henry were responsible for building up the parks Groenendaal in Heemstede and the Haarlemmerhout, the two largest city parks in the area. The boys were brought up by their mother, who kept the Heemstede property and received visitors there to view the gardens with the many follies and her large art collection. Her sons became the wards of Henry Hope. When he fled the country in 1794/95, he took the young men and as much art they could ship from Hellevoetsluis, around 370 paintings. The Heemstede and Haarlem estates were left in the hands of Henry Hope's fiduciary, the adopted John Williams Hope, as was the Amsterdam banking office and warehouses. In 1802 only Adrian Elias returned to the Netherlands, notorious because of his unpredictable behavior; he spend the rest of his life working on the gardens of Groenendaal and Bosbeek, until he was declared insane, presumably by order of his family, and died in 1834 without offspring.

== Fire machine ==
After observing the "fire engine" on display at Leiden University, Hope wrote to James Watt and Matthew Boulton and had his own "fire machine", the first steam engine for a garden, installed on the high wooded grounds of his summer home. The park he purchased and expanded was located on a high sandy ridge of dunes between the Leidsevaart and Harlem Lake. He used the steam engine to pump water into his gardens, which was highly unusual, since most Dutchmen of his day were trying to discover ways of pumping water out of places. The windmill he had previously installed proved unable to provide enough water on windless days for his richly planted garden in the English style. The steam engine was installed in 1781, and worked until well after the French occupation in the 1820s. In 1842 it was broken up, for even as a curiosity it could no longer hold out against the much larger steam boiler of the Cruquius pumping station down the road.

== Sources ==
- John Hope in the Vroedschap van Amsterdam (1578–1795), by Johan Engelbert Elias, Volume 2, 1905, Amsterdam, on historici.nl
- Groenendaal. Albumuitgave van de Vereniging Oud-Heemstede-Bennebroek (VOHB), 1978.
- Hans Krol. Geschiedenis van het buitengoed Bosbeek en van het adellijk geslacht Van Merlen. Heemstede, VOHB, 1987.
