= Jeremiah Harman =

British chief (1763–1844)

- Born: 19 August 1763; London, England
- Died: 7 February 1844 (aged 80); London, England
- Occupations: Banker, merchant
- Spouse: Mary Howard (1765–1861)
- Father: John Harman (d. 1817)

Jeremiah Harman (19 August 1763 – 7 February 1844) was "chief of a family known in the commercial world for nearly a century, and highly esteemed both in England and other countries. He may himself be said to have stood at the head of the city, both as to mercantile and private character; liberal in his dealings, and inspiring confidence by his honour and integrity, as well as love for his personal qualities". As a public character Mr. Harman was known to all the ministers of the day, from William Pitt Jr downwards.

== Mercantile and banking career ==
Harman was the principal partner of the very old standing family business, Harman and Co., in which his father was also a principal partner. The business originated with the Lisbon trade and was in extensive transactions with Portugal at the time of the Great Lisbon earthquake of 1755. To the Russian court, the house has been bankers for half a century.

Harman was director of the Bank of England from 1794 to 1827; embracing the eventful period of the restriction of cash payments, and all the great financial and political difficulties of England. He was much consulted by William Pitt the Younger and Lord Liverpool on all questions of moment; and also gave evidence of the most important character before the Bullion Committee of 1810; before the Committees on the resumption of Cash Payments, in 1819; on the Bank Charter Committee, in 1832 which formed the basis for the Bank of England's Bank Charter Act 1833; and on other investigations of similar character and importance.

He was Governor of the Bank of England between 1816 and 1818, and in his first year; an addition of 25%, was made to the capital of Bankstock. Three years afterward, in 1819, the thanks of the court were voted to him for his share in the labors of a commission which had been appointed by the Crown for the prevention of forgery.

=== Role in financial crisis ===
Harman was a key figure in history for his sound judgment in implementing policy changes for dealing with financial crises. His role in the Restriction of Cash Payment, Resumption of Cash Payments and the Bank Charter Act 1833, along with his daily dealings in his role of director and governor all helped to form an understanding of what a financial crisis is. He retired shortly after the Panic of 1825 in 1827 from the position of director. His efforts were so valued that the thanks of the General Court were unanimously voted to him for his long and valuable services.

=== Role in the slave trade ===
Harman is known to be a promenade figure who supported abolition as he was a subscriber of the London Committee for the Society for the Abolition of the Slave Trade since its initial publication. So there are ties with abolition in this 1787 subscription, but he was also close friends and long time business partner with Samuel Hoare Jr, abolitionist. The quaker founded firm had longstanding family partnership that was known for not only it's strong and early stance on abolition, but on philanthropy in general. Whilst indirectly financing slavery through accepting assets that utilized slaves as collateral to loans and benefiting from the compensation scheme for slavers established as part of the Slavery Abolition Act 1833. In June 2020 the Bank of England issued a public apology for the involvement of Harman, amongst other employees, in the slave trade following the investigation by the Centre for the Study of the Legacies of British Slave-ownership.

== Love for artwork and aesthetics ==
In 1797 the most famous Orleans collection of pictures was acquired by Harman from Walter Boyd, of whom he had previously conducted extensive business with. The collection was sold in the following year to the 3rd Duke of Bridgwater. Much of the collection still remains within the Duke's family. Harman was well distinguished for his love and knowledge of the best works of the ancient masters; he was also a friend to many modern artists. The renowned painter and collector Charles Lock Eastlake dedicated the translation of Goethe's Theory of Colours to Jeremiah. The work ended up landing Eastlake the titles of secretary of the Fine Arts Commission and Keeper of the National Gallery of London. Being a friend and supporter of Eastlake, Harman commissioned Eastlake's first painting, a trend that would continue for many years.

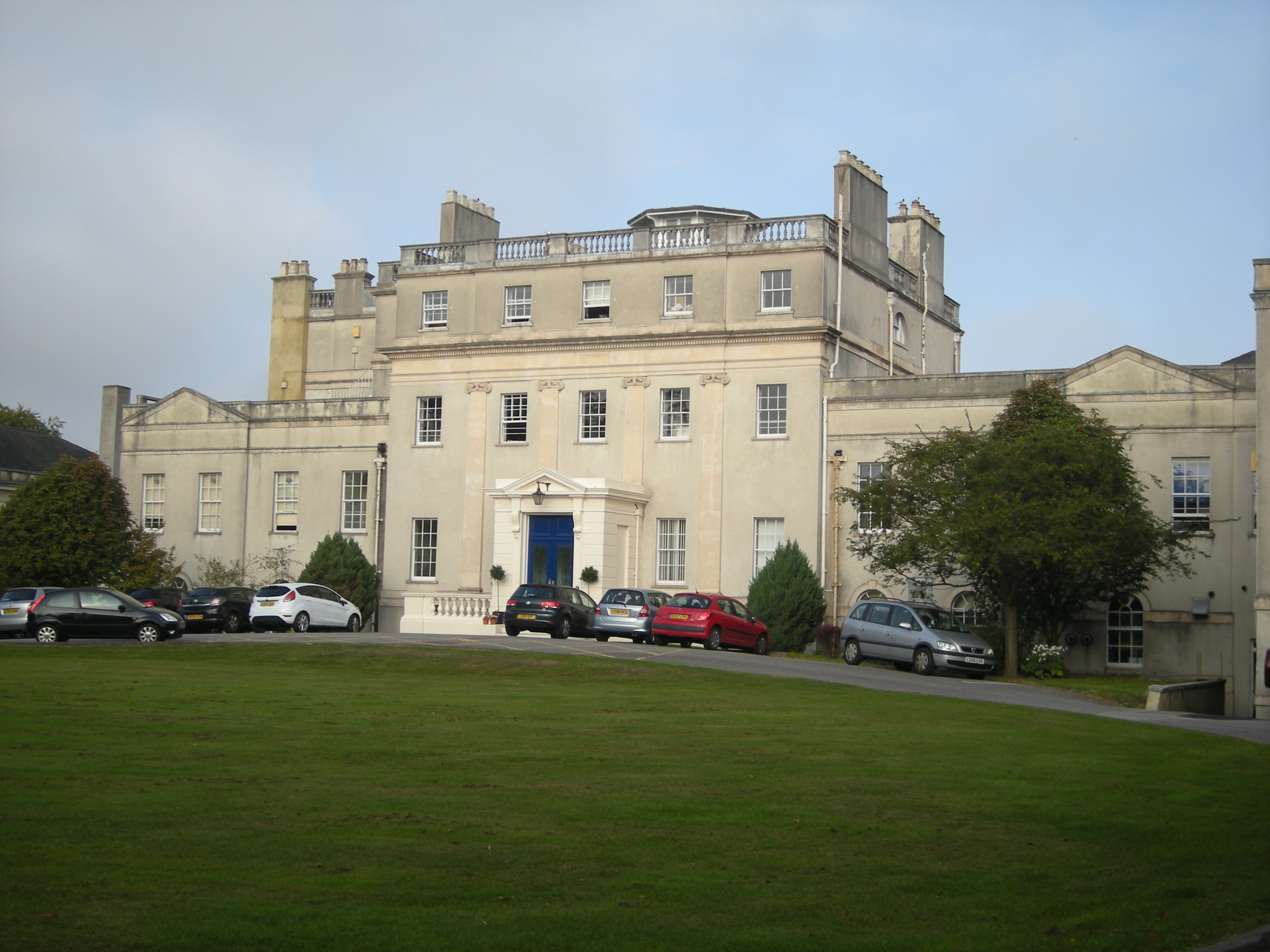
Higham House; the 1768 building designed by William Newton.

After his father's death in 1817, Harman inherited Higham House in Woodford, to the north of London, which had considerably more wall space; this, in turn, led to his collection increasing in size. Hingham House is currently the Woodford County High School. Harman kept nearly two miles of pleasure gardens there "upon which the most fastidious eye might have satisfactorily gazed" (Gentleman's Magazine vol 175).

== Charitable pursuits ==
Harman was present at almost all the councils connected with charitable institutions in London, and his father and himself were amongst the founders and chief patrons of the Philanthropic Society in St. George's Fields, c. 1789. An organization which still operates to this day. In acts of private charity, also, no one was more ready and liberal in relieving distress. In fact, Harman was a member and trustee of the Society of Friends of Foreigners In Distress. An organization that was well-funded and aimed at providing relief for those who were most at need in London.
