= Bullion Committee =

Committee to put Sterling on the gold standard

The Bullion Committee was a British government committee set up in 1819 in order to research the possibility of putting Britain back onto the gold standard and how to carry it out. Sir Robert Peel was the chairman of the committee. He managed to put sterling on the gold standard two years earlier than planned. Other members were David Ricardo and Jeremiah Harman Esq.

The effects of the return to the gold standard were not without controversy. Industrialists complained that full employment had been sacrificed to sound money. Thomas Attwood claimed 'Peels Act' created 'more misery, more poverty, more discord, more of everything that was calamitous to the nation, except death, than Attila caused in the Roman Empire'.

== See also ==
Bank Restriction Act 1797
