= Henry Philip Hope =

Anglo-Dutch art and gem collector (1774–1839)

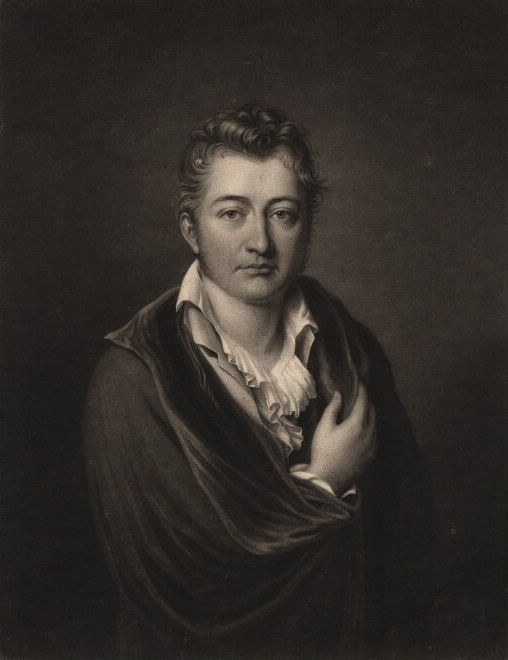
- Painting by Thomas Goff Lupton After Bouton
- Born: 8 June 1774; Amsterdam
- Died: 5 December 1839 (aged 65); Kent, United Kingdom
- Organization: Society of Dilettanti
- Parents: Jan Hope (father); Philippina Barbara van der Hoeven (mother)
- Relatives: Thomas Hope (brother); Adrian Elias Hope (brother); Henry Thomas Hope (nephew)

Henry Philip Hope (8 June 1774, Amsterdam – 5 December 1839, Kent) was a collector of Dutch origin based in London. He was one of the heirs of the bank Hope & Co. without having been a banker himself but rather a famous collector of the arts and more particularly precious gems.

== Origins ==
He was the son of Jan Hope and Philippina Barbara van der Hoeven. He was the youngest brother of Thomas Hope and Adrian Elias Hope.

He inherited a grand home on Duchess Street, Cavendish Square, London, that he kept from his father's death in 1831 until he sold it for demolition in 1851.

== Collector ==
He was a prominent collector of gems, including the Hope Diamond (a blue diamond of 45.52 carats (9.104 g)) and a large pearl of 1,800 grains (or 90 g) which still bear the name of Hope. The catalogue of his collection was published by Bram Hertz shortly after his death. Hope also had an extensive library, some of which was sold by auction in his lifetime by Leigh & Sotheby in London on 18 February 1813 (& 17 following days), including 3639 lots of books and manuscripts. A copy of the catalogue is held at Cambridge University Library, shelfmark Munby.c.159(5).

The conditions for the acquisition of the blue diamond remain uncertain. The archives found at the National Museum of Natural History leave no room for certainty. It may be possible that Henry Philip Hope acquired the French blue diamond after his flight in 1792. Records reveal that Henry Philip Hope also bought a 137-carat sapphire that had previously belonged to the Ruspoli family of Rome which was confused until 2013 with Louis XIV's "Grand Saphir". The Grand was of comparable weight, but has different facets (rhomboid instead of cushion).

Portraits of Henry Philip Hope

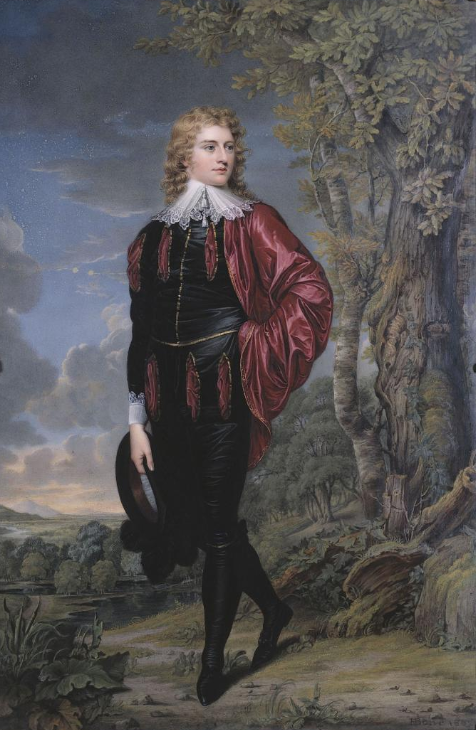
Hope by Henry Bone, after Guy Head

Hope in Turkish costum, by Thomas Lawrence, completed by Martin Archer Shee

== Inheritance ==
When his brother, Adrian Elias Hope, died in 1834 with no wife or children, he inherited £500,000 (or £56,188,700 in 2025 currency).

In his book on precious stones, the French mineralogist René Just Haüy cites Henry Philip Hope as one of the most distinguished patrons of the arts of his time. When he died in 1839, his collection was viewed as "...one of most perfect collections of diamonds and precious stones that has, perhaps, ever been possessed by a private individual..."

== See also ==
- List of pearls by size

== Bibliography ==
Notes

References

- Sutton, Peter C.; Bikker, Jonathan; Bruce Museum of Arts and Science (2006). Jan van der Heyden. Yale University Press. ISBN 9780300119701. - Total pages: 250
- Kurin, Richard (2017). Hope Diamond: The Legendary History of a Cursed Gem. Smithsonian Institution. ISBN 9781588344199. - Total pages: 400
- Matlins, Antoinette L. (2001). The Pearl Book: The Definitive Buying Guide - How to Select, Buy, Care for and Enjoy Pearls. Gemstone Press. ISBN 9780943763354. - Total pages: 198
