= Henry Hope =

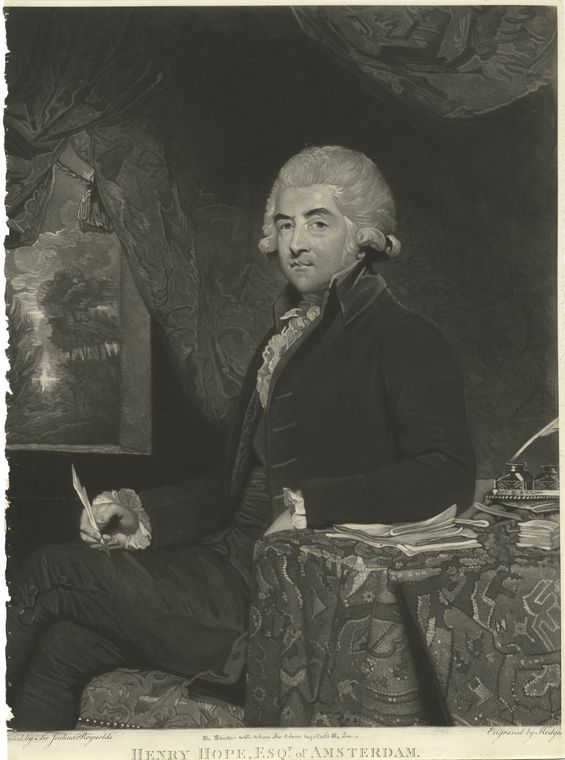
Henry Hope in 1788, mezzotint by Charles Howard Hodges after a now-lost painting by Sir Joshua Reynolds.

Henry Hope (1735–1811) was an Amsterdam merchant banker born in Braintree, Province of Massachusetts Bay. He emigrated to the Netherlands to join the family business, the Dutch bank Hope & Co., at a young age. From 1779, Henry became the manager of Hope & Co. and participated in the firm for about a third from 1782. He is considered to be as great a genius as his uncle Thomas Hope who founded Hope & Co. in 1762. In 1786 Adam Smith dedicated the fourth edition of his book The Wealth of Nations to Henry Hope in hopes of increasing his readership:

== Early years ==
His father, Henry, was a Rotterdam merchant of Scottish lineage who left for the "new world" after experiencing financial difficulties in the economic bubble of 1720. Though born in Rotterdam, he was considered Scottish because his father and brothers were members of the Scottish Church in Rotterdam. Henry the elder settled near Boston and became a Freemason and merchant. When his son Henry the younger was 13, he sent him to London for schooling, and six years later in 1754 he became apprenticed there to Henry Hoare of the well-known banking firm called Gurnell, Hoare, & Harman.

In 1762, he accompanied his only sister, Henrietta Maria (aka Harriet), to the Dutch Republic when she married the son of a Rotterdam merchant and business associate, John Goddard. Henry went to work for his uncles, Thomas and Adrian, together with his cousin, Jan Hope (who at 26 opted to be baptized a second time as "John"), in the family business in Amsterdam. Eighteenth-century Amsterdam was the largest port in Europe and the continent's center of commerce and merchant banking. By that time, the Hope brothers were already established as leading merchants in the Netherlands, but when the younger Hopes joined the Amsterdam branch, the name was changed from Hope Brothers (more familiarly, "the Hopes") to Hope & Co. Hope & Co. soon played a major part in the finances of the Dutch East India Company (VOC).

== Career as a merchant ==
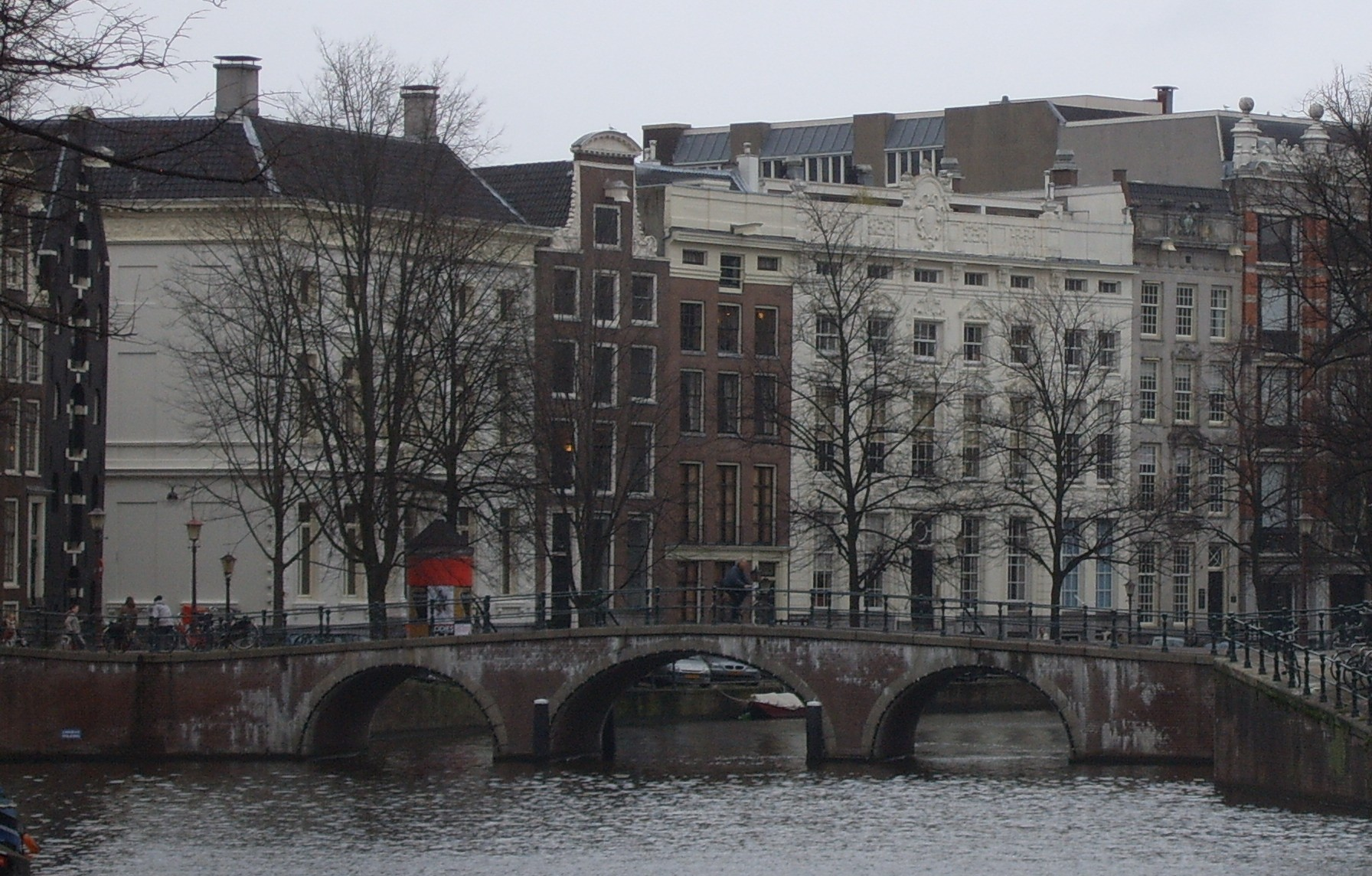
Offices of Hope & Co. for more than a century: Keizersgracht 444-446 Amsterdam (the white building on the right). The brown building on the left is 448, the private residence of Henry Hope. In the 1770s the bell gables of these three buildings were remodelled in the style of the times and crowned in the center with the Hope family shield. Rijksmonument status since 1970

In the aftermath of the Seven Years' War, Hope & Co. entered the arena of international banking. Henry's first substantial foreign loan was to Adolf Frederick of Sweden in 1767. In the next twenty years, the country was to borrow a total of 15 million guilders. For Spain Hope organised state loans for nine million guilders in the 1780s. Sometimes the loans were Henry Hope's own funds, but usually Henry Hope headed a consortium of English and Dutch investors; Hope & Co. collected a commission that ranged between 5-9%. The firm also specialized in loans to planters in the West Indies, taking payment in kind: sugar, coffee or tobacco, which the Hopes would then sell on the Amsterdam market.

In exchange for loans to the King of Portugal, Hope & Co received an exclusive concession to sell diamonds originating in the Portuguese colony of Brazil. The Hopes would accept the diamonds and sell them on the Amsterdam market; then they used the proceeds to defray the interest and principal of the loans they had made to Portugal. These sales helped to make Amsterdam the leading diamond center of Europe.

In 1784 Henry and John Williams Hope purchased a warehouse on the Amstel, together with his fellow banker friends. They commissioned the design of the Kleine Komedie to the architect Abraham van der Hart who completed the theatre in 1788. In 1785 Henry was involved in the foundings of a nautical college in Amsterdam.

In 1786 Adam Smith wrote:

In this fourth Edition I have made no alterations of any kind. I now, however, find myself at liberty to acknowledge my very great obligations to Mr. HENRY HOPE of Amsterdam. To that Gentleman I owe the most distinct, as well as liberal information, concerning a very interesting and important subject, the Bank of Amsterdam; of which no printed account had ever appeared to me satisfactory, or even intelligible. The name of that Gentleman is so well known in Europe, the information which comes from him must do so much honour to whoever has been favoured with it, and my vanity is so much interested in making this acknowledgment, that I can no longer refuse myself the pleasure of prefixing this Advertisement to this new Edition of my Book.

Hope & Co also became important for Russia. The most important client of Hope & Co. was Catherine the Great. In addition to a large loans to Russia, Hope & Co. obtained the right to export sugar to Russia, and the firm acted as agents for sales of Russian wheat and timber to countries throughout Europe. During the 1780s, Catherine the Great offered Henry Hope a title, which he declined, feeling advancement to the nobility was incompatible with his position as a working merchant banker. Both Henry and Catherine were leading art collectors, and Henry Hope sometimes acted as an art dealer.

== Welgelegen ==
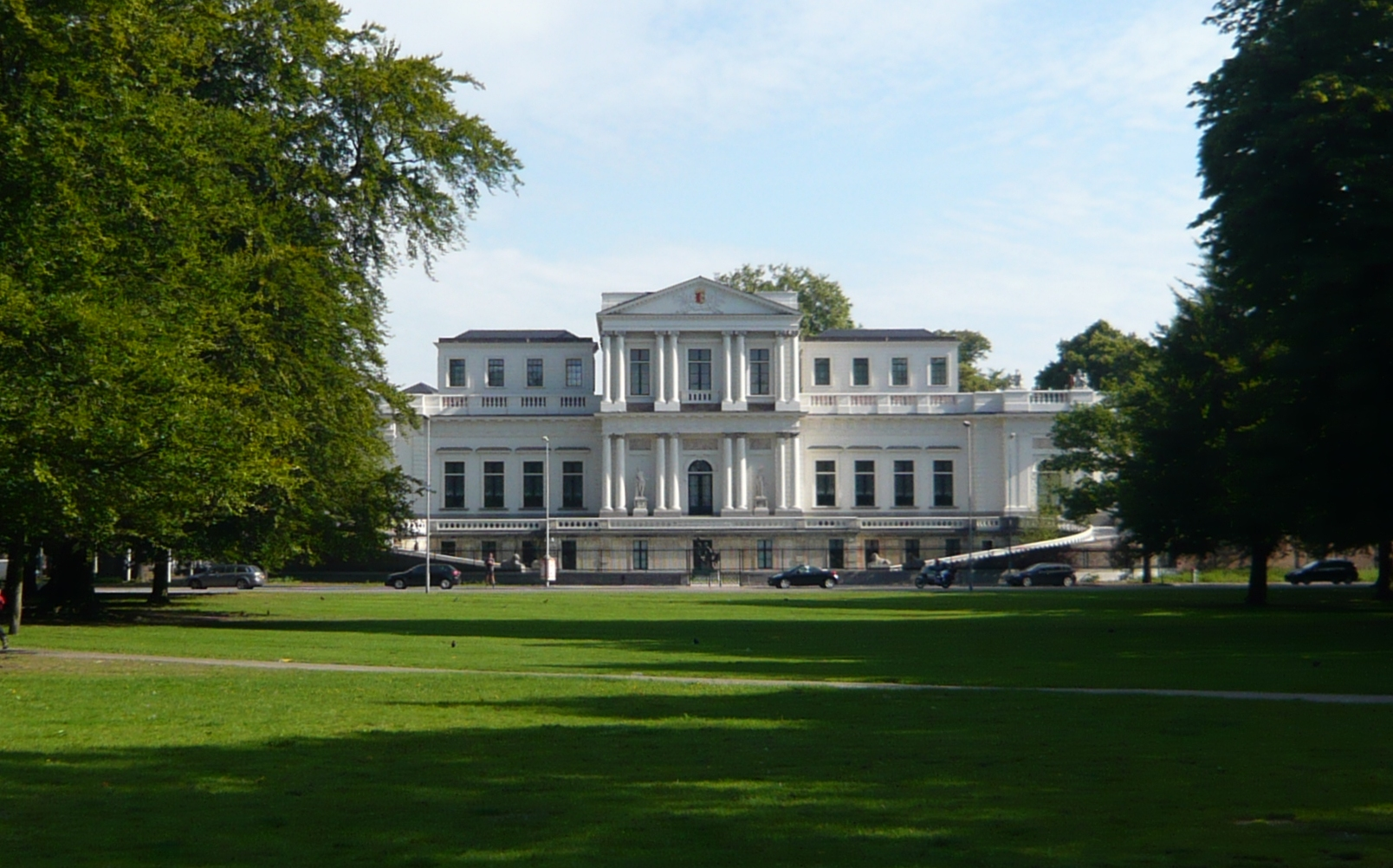
Front of Villa Welgelegen on the Paviljoenslaan, Haarlem

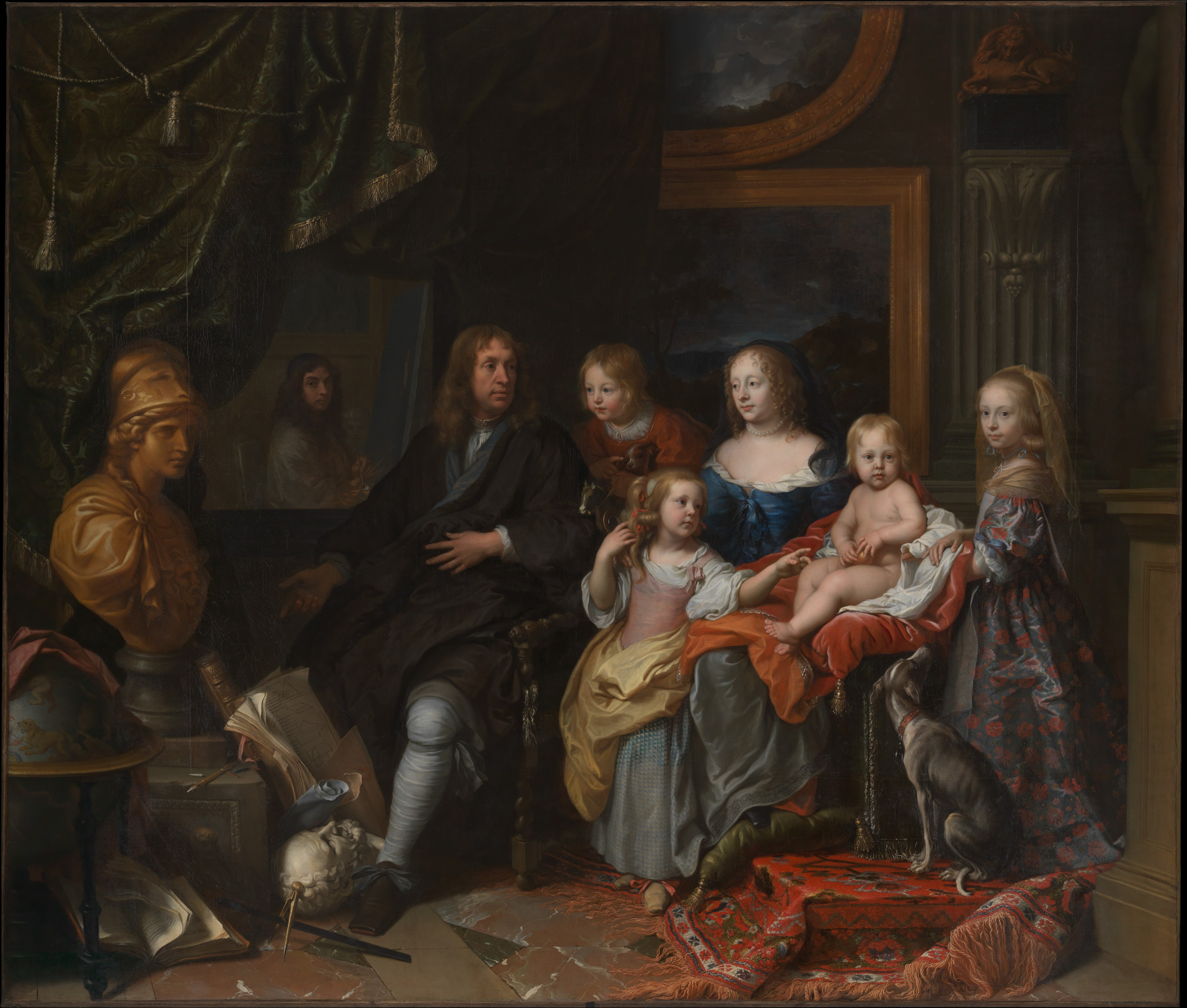
Everhard Jabach and his family, owned by Henry Hope since 1792.

Today Henry Hope is best known for his summer home, the Villa Welgelegen. He acquired a large art collection and built the villa in 1785 to house the collection. The villa, designed by Abraham van der Hart was erected in 1785. Building this summer palace, a five-year project, became a summer attraction in its own right, rivaling the neighboring park, Groenendaal, established in Heemstede by his cousin, partner, and neighbor, Jan (John) Hope. In 1781, Henry started receiving uninvited visitors to view the gardens and expansion process. He ordered statues from Francesco Righetti, an Italian sculptor. The execution of these ambitious plans did not seem to make a dent in his enormous wealth; in 1782, he purchased Hope Lodge (Fort Washington, Pennsylvania) as a wedding gift for the son of his American cousin, Maria Ellis.

Henry is said to have been influenced in his choice of the Neo-Classical style by the Hôtel de Salm in Paris, built in 1782 by Frederick III, Prince of Salm-Kyrburg.

At Welgelegen he received many of the important figures of the day, and, during the summer each year, he was a neighbor of many of them. He knew and received the Americans, Thomas Jefferson, Benjamin Franklin, and John Adams, who came to Europe for trade negotiations. Henry Hope was an Orangist and received William V of Orange whom he knew through his uncle, the elder Thomas Hope.

== Family ==
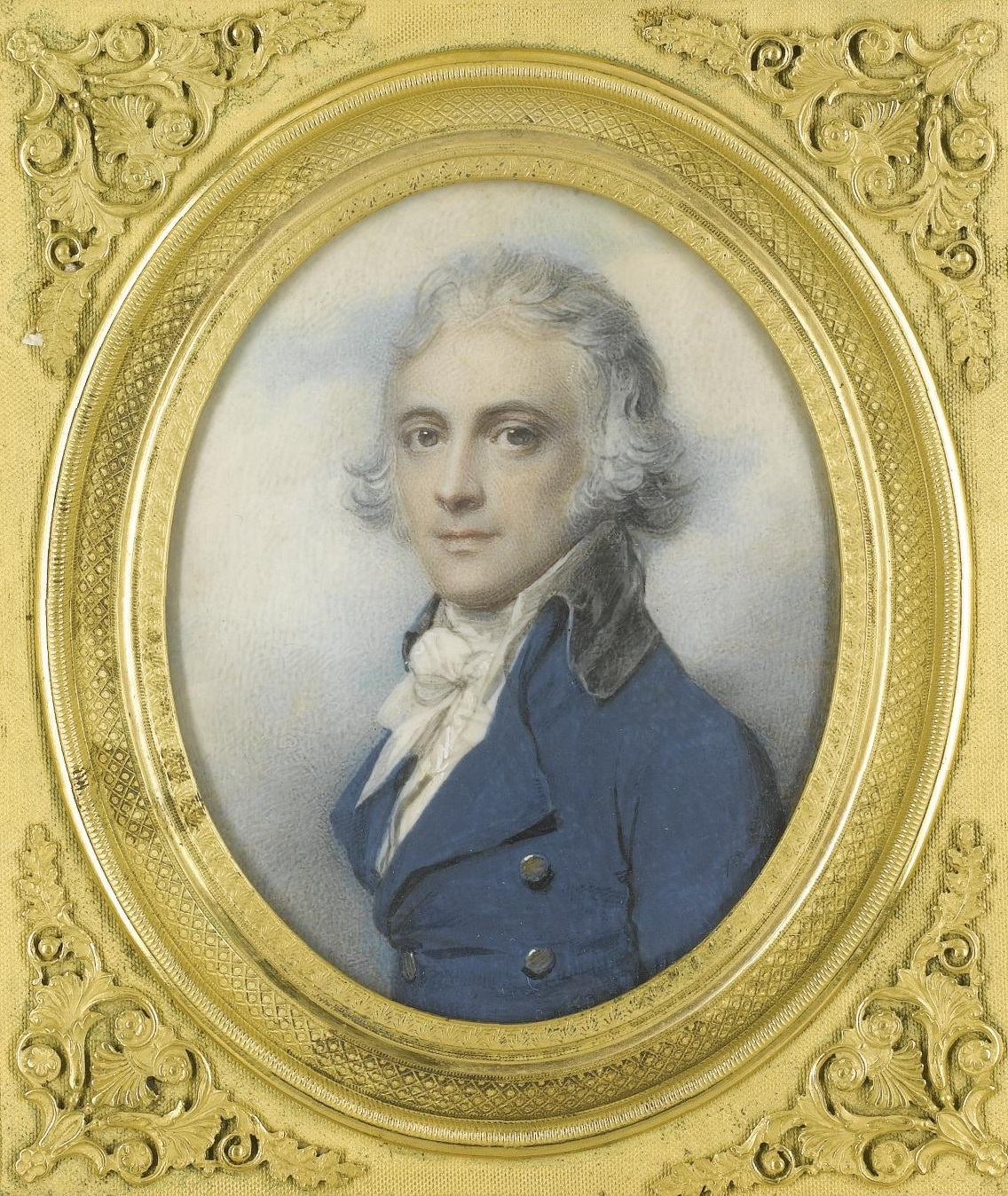
John Williams Hope (1757–1813), (Richard Cosway, 1796).

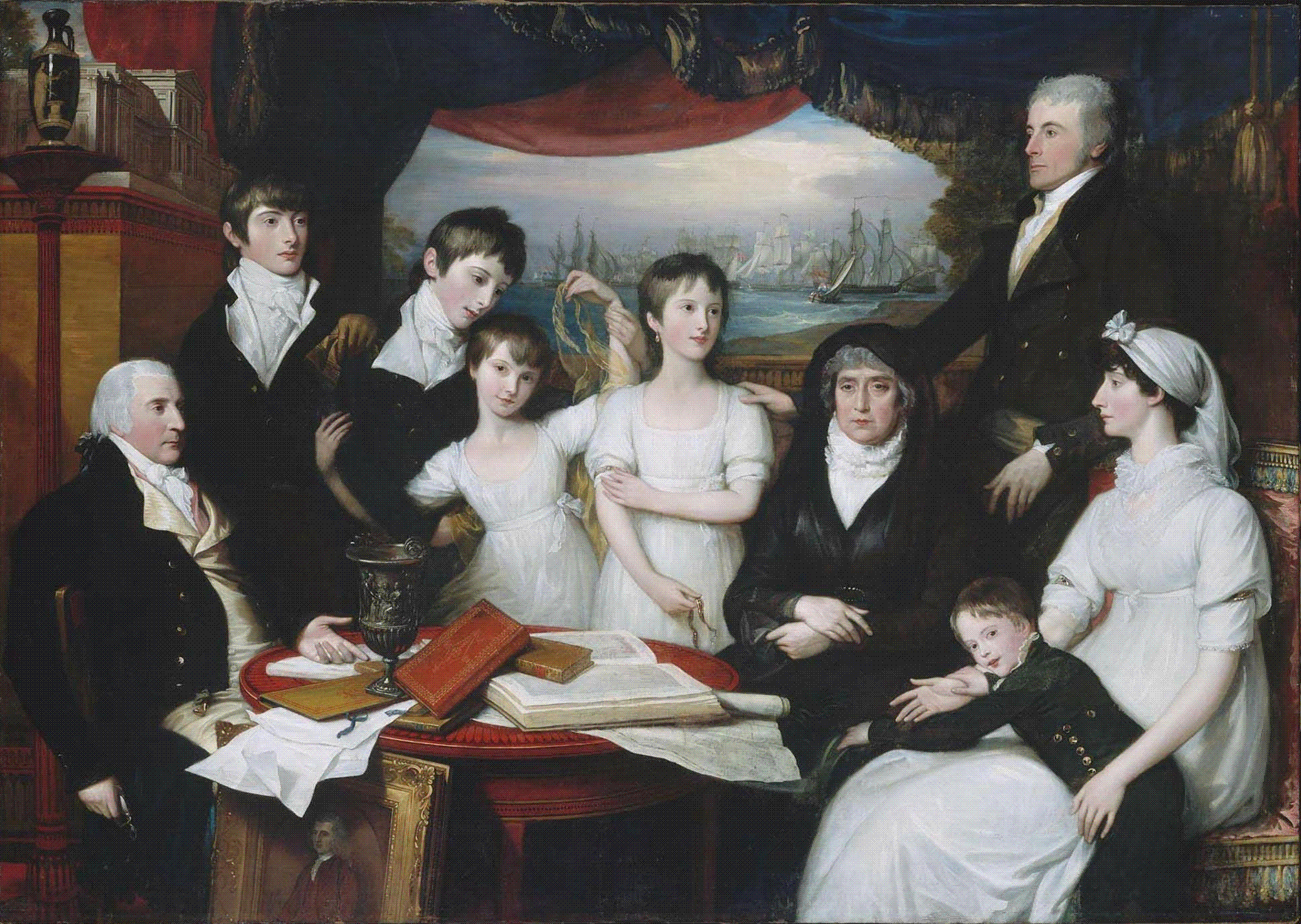
Henry Hope's Family, in British exile in 1802, by Benjamin West. The adults, from left to right, are Henry Hope, his recently widowed sister Harriet Goddard (1735–1814), John Williams, and Ann Goddard Williams (b. 1763). The children of John and Ann Williams, left to right, are Henry (1785), Adrian (1788), Elizabeth (1794), Henrietta (1790), and William (1803). Henry points to the ashes of John Goddard (1737–1800), his brother-in-law and business associate; above his head rests a model of Welgelegen, which he had just made over to John Williams.

Through their activities as merchants and bankers, Henry Hope and his cousin, Jan Hope, amassed great fortunes. They were among the richest men in Europe. Jan married the daughter of a Rotterdam mayor and had three sons. Henry never married, but he took in the young clerk John Williams, a Cornishman working at another merchant house in Amsterdam, when he was sick. After he recovered, he went to work for Henry as the daily manager and when he married Henry's sister's daughter in 1782, he changed his name to John Williams Hope and became partner in the Amsterdam branch. When Jan/John Hope died in 1784, it became especially good for the business to have another person on hand who could sign the name "John Hope". This was also the reason that John Williams Hope stayed behind in Amsterdam during the French occupation when the rest of the family fled to London.

== Relocation to London ==
When Pichegru occupied the south, Henry fled from Hellevoetsluis on 17 October 1794 and took 372 paintings with him.

From the Earl of Hopetoun he bought a mansion at the corner of Harley Street/Cavendish Square and started a branch of Hope & Co. Henry became friendly with Francis Baring with whom he entered upon many large land deals with various royal names. In the same way he had done with "Villa Welgelegen" in the Netherlands, Henry Hope opened the mansion as a semi-public museum. In the Amsterdam City Archives there is a catalogue (in English!) of all the paintings and prints owned by Henry Hope in December 1795. The museum included three vase galleries filled with Ancient Greek and South Italian vases the Hopes purchased from Sir William Hamilton's second vase collection.

== Land deals ==
The largest land deal that he and Barings entered upon was the issue of shares to finance the Louisiana Purchase in 1804, more than a year after the treaty was signed. He and Barings had been working on the deal for almost a decade, and sent young Alexander Baring as their agent to act in America, where he first negotiated a large land deal in Maine, then still a part of Massachusetts. While there, Alexander Baring helped settle a treaty with David Cobb. The deal, completed in February 1796, gave Mr. Baring one-half interest in the "Penobscot million" and one-half interest in a third tract of acquired property north of this 1 million-acre (4,000 km^{2}) expanse. Baring, to become the first Baron Ashburton, was himself to play a role in both the economic and political history of Maine in general and Down East Maine in particular. Along with Daniel Webster, he negotiated the treaty that resolved the disputes over Maine's northwest boundary (Henry had family in Nova Scotia).

== Legacy ==
Though he always hoped to return to Welgelegen, Henry died childless in London in 1811, leaving capital of 12 million guilders, an art collection, and several large properties. He was a generous uncle to his many nieces and nephews in London, Heemstede, and Pennsylvania. On his death, his accumulated wealth was split between the children of his cousin Jan (who inherited Deepdene), the children of his cousin Maria (who inherited Hope Lodge), and the children of his sister Harriet (who inherited villa Welgelegen). Before his death, he commissioned a family portrait with his sister Harriet and the family of his adopted son John Williams Hope and Harriet's daughter Ann. The painting, by Benjamin West, shows a model of Welgelegen that sits atop a mahogany chest, probably designed by Thomas Hope. The painting hangs in the Museum of Fine Arts in Boston. The museum identifies Ann as Henry Hope's heir.

== Sources ==
- Buist, M.G. (1974) At spes non fracta: Hope & Co. 1770-1815. Merchant bankers and diplomats at work. Den Haag, Martinus Nijhoff. ISBN 90-247-1629-2
- Hope & Co. archives at the Amsterdam city archives
