= Groenendaal Park =

Park in Heemstede, the Netherlands

Coordinates: 52°20′23″N 4°36′53″E

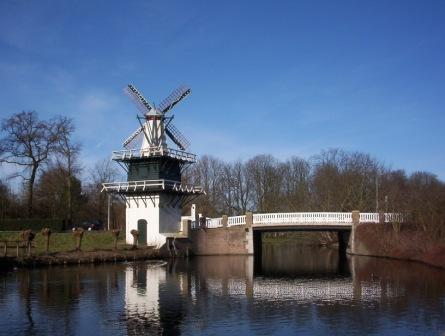
The Groenendaal windmill today, landmark of Heemstede.

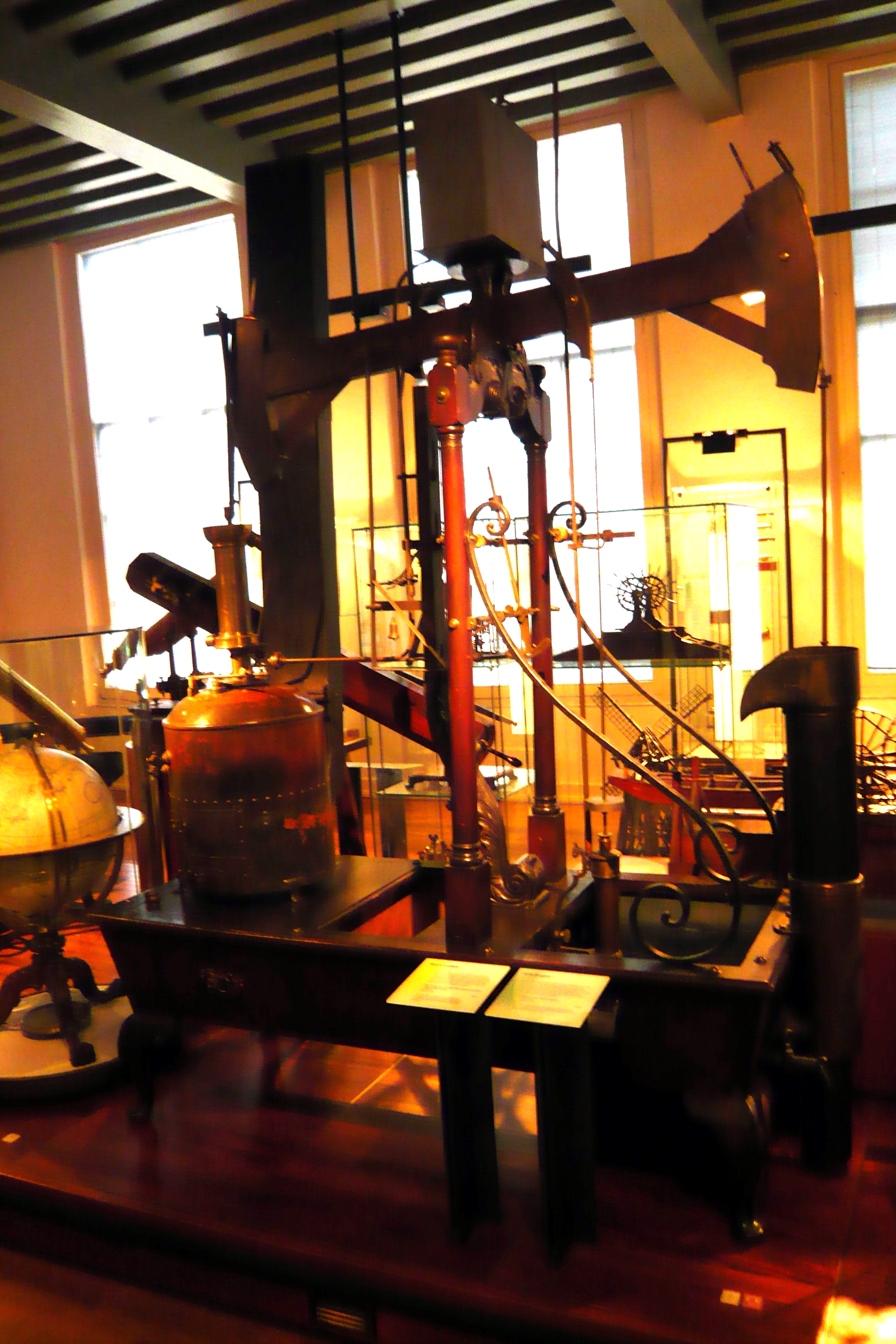
1774 model of copper kettle steam engine from Leiden, similar to the one that was built in this windmill in 1781.

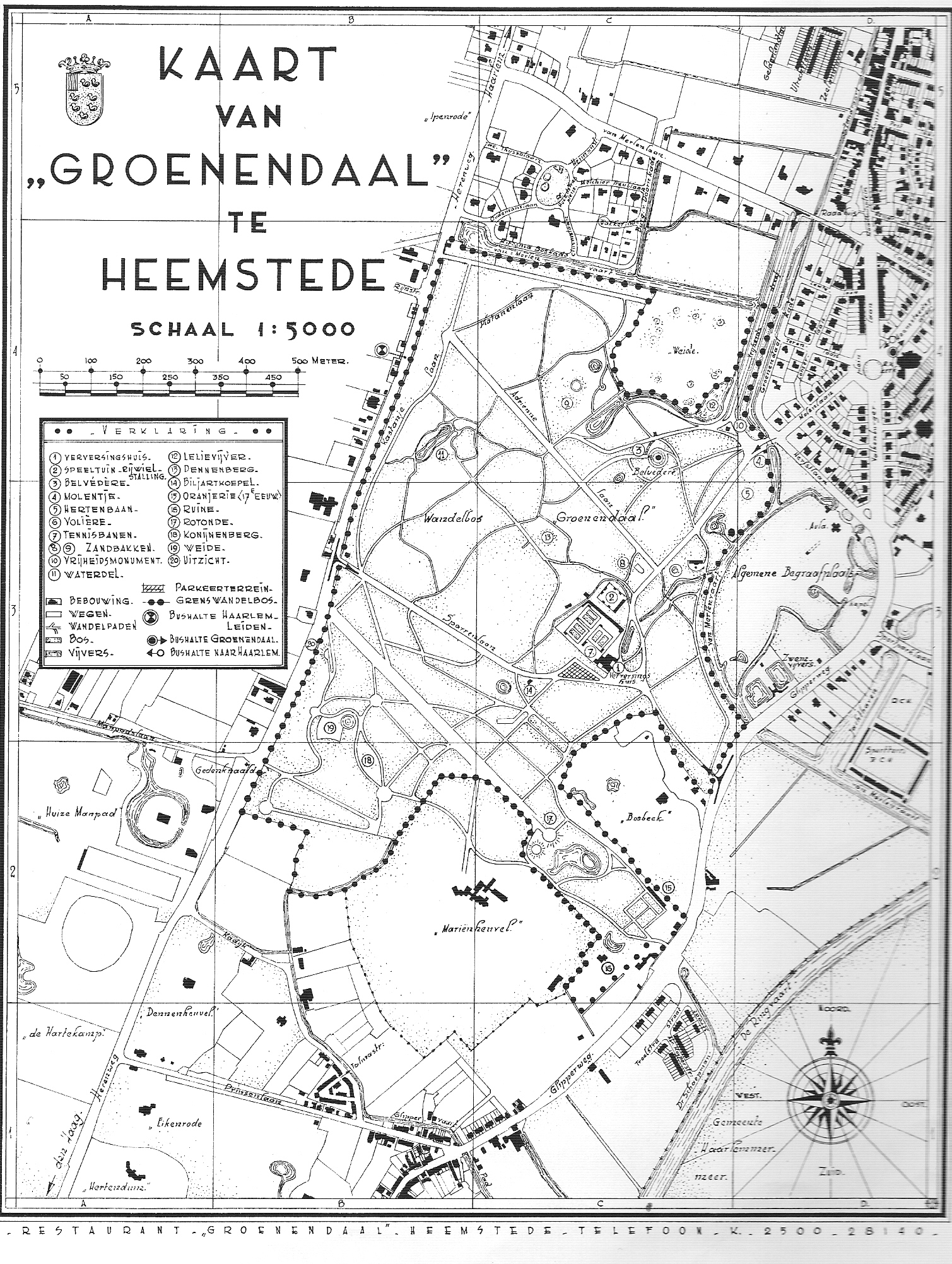
A map of Groenendaal park from the 1950s.

Groenendaal park lies at the center of Heemstede, Netherlands. The park includes the grounds of old Heemstede country estates Bosbeek, and Meer en Berg. Along its western borders are the old Heemstede country estates Hartekamp, Huis te Manpad, and Iepenrode. On the eastern boundary is the city cemetery.

== History ==
In the 17th century Groenendaal was mostly sand dunes. The sand was dug and sold to barges that carried it to Amsterdam for building purposes. Later the resulting fields were used for bleaching linen, and still later for growing tulip bulbs. During the heyday of the tulip craze, Amsterdam merchants purchased land in the Haarlem-Heemstede area for summer homes. Groenendaal park is situated at the site of the former summer home of Amsterdam banker Jan Hope, whose estate Bosbeek was the first example of a large garden in the 'English Style' in the 18th century in the Netherlands. The grounds are part of a long sandy ridge of deciduous forest running in a straight line from the Hague to Alkmaar. The park was designed by John Hope in 1760 and remained in his family for 3 generations. It was purchased by Heemstede and made into a public park in 1913. It has been the scene of two international flower shows, the Flora of 1935 and the Flora of 1953.

== Steam engine ==
Jan Hope installed the first steam engine for garden use at the site of this windmill in 1781, which had an opposite purpose than most Dutch windmills. He wanted to pump water into his estate to grow the unusual plants and trees he had cultivated in the dry sand. Dutch windmills are normally used for pumping water out of places. He first built a small windmill much like the one standing today. After hearing of power to be had from steam, he wrote to James Watt and Matthew Boulton to order an improved version of the Newcomen engine. When the big red copper kettle arrived, it was installed by Rinse Lieve Brouwer. In circa 1850 the steam engine was broken down and the copper kettle sold for scrap. The steam engine had a dual purpose; one was to pump water into the garden, en the other was to act as an attraction in and of itself. In the 18th century garden owners went to great lengths to decorate their gardens to attract visitors.

The attraction of a steam engine became obsolete when the Cruquius steam engine mill was built down the road. In 1850 the Cruquius mill, together with two others, took 3 years to pump out the Haarlem lake.
