= Hendrik Keun =

Dutch painter

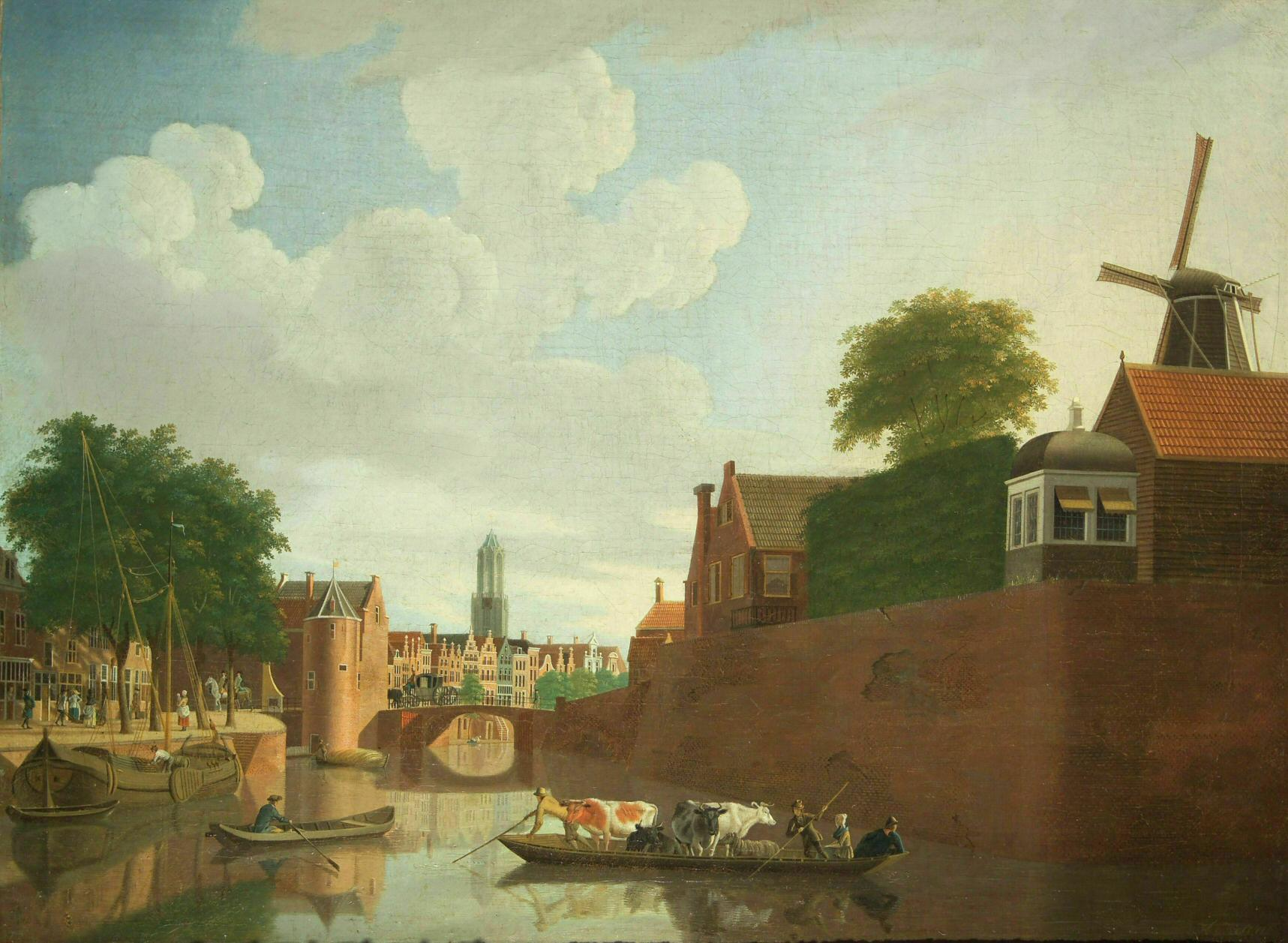
View of Utrecht (Zandbrug bridge and Morgenster (bastion) (ca. 1765)

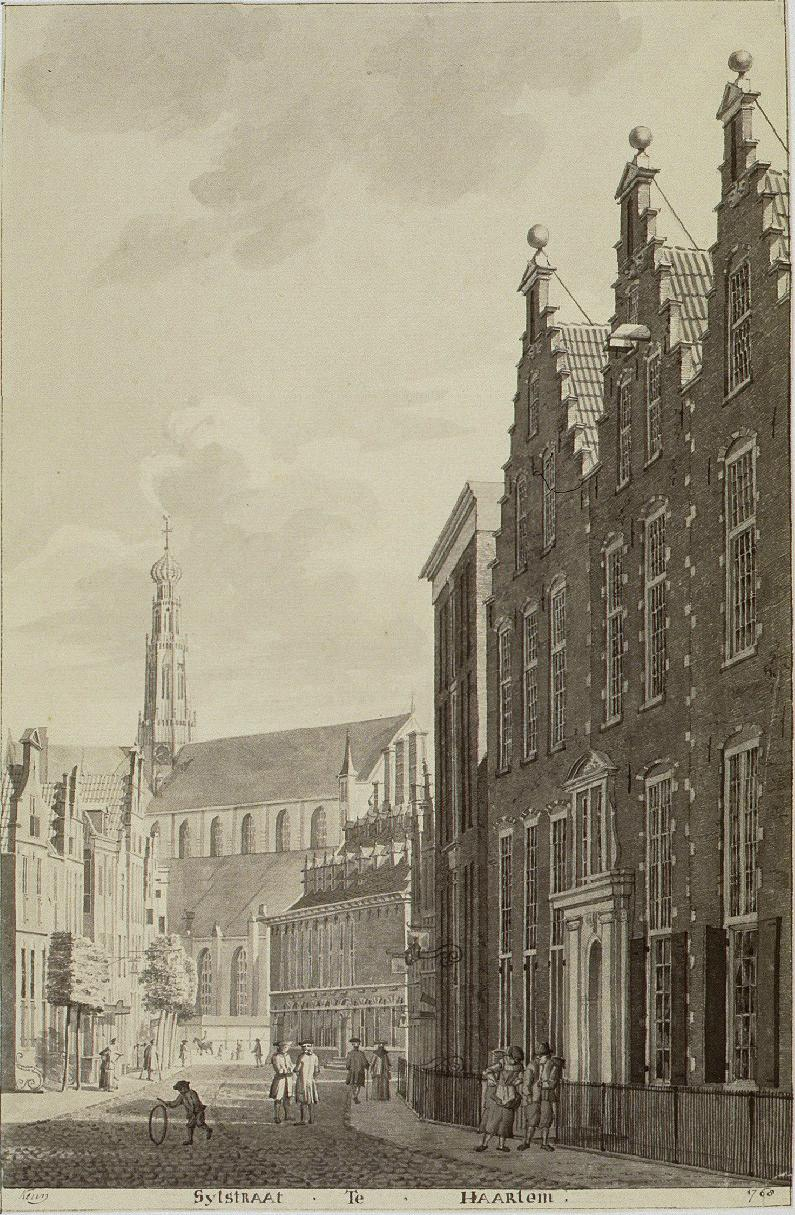
Engraving of the Zijlstraat (Haarlem), 1768

Hendrik Keun (1738–1787) was an 18th-century painter from the Dutch Republic.

== Biography ==
He was born and died in Haarlem. According to the RKD his cityscapes were inspired by Jan van der Heyden; according to another biographer he was inspired by the Berckheyde brothers. His view of the Zijlstraat in Haarlem was engraved for the city of Haarlem.
