= Harman and Co. =

English banking firm

- Formerly: Jonathan Gurnell & Co.; Gurnell and Hoare; Gurnell, Hoare, Harman & Co.; Gurnell, Hoare & Harman; Gurnell, Hoare & Co.; Harman, Hoare & Co.
- Industry: Finance
- Founded: c. 1740 in London England
- Founders: Jonathan Gurnell (1684-1745)
- Defunct: 1846
- Headquarters: London, England, UK
- Key people: Joseph Hoare (d. 1729); Samuel Hoare Jr; Samuel Hoare Sr (1716–1796); John Harman; Jeremiah Harman; Edward Harman; Henry Harman
- Products: Financial services

Harman and Co. was a well-known and respected English banking firm in the City of London. It was founded around 1740 by Quaker partners Jonathan Gurnell (1684-1753) (who married in 1711 Grizell Wilmer of Pitzhanger Manor) and Joseph Hoare (d. 1729), and was in business until 1846. The firm traded extensively with Portugal and were agents for the Russian Imperial Court in St. Petersburg.

The firm had close ties to the Society for Effecting the Abolition of the Slave Trade The only surviving brother of one of its founders was the abolitionist Samuel Hoare Jr. Jeremiah Harman, son of one of the early investors, was one of the first merchants to support the abolition movement.

Henry Hope, later a significant international merchant banker, apprenticed in the firm during 1754-1760

== Family Relations of the Company ==
Founder Jonathan Gurnell had left a quaker farming background in Westmorland to try is fortune in London. By his mid twenties he was established as a Portuguese merchant. William Penn and other leading Quakers had attended his marriage in 1711 to Grizzle Wilmer of a family highest Quaker and earlier Puritan credentials. This marriage brought Jonathan Grendel three sons and three daughters. Hanna, one of his daughters married Jeremiah Harman in 1732, she later died young in 1741.

The Harmans and Hoards were descended from military officers who had served in Ireland before the families became Quaker.

After the death of Jonathan Gurnell and two of his sons, in the early 1750's the firm was reorganized as a partnership of his remaining son, Thomas Gurnell and is son-in-law Samuel Hoare. Soon after in 1762 the grandson John harman would join the partnership.

When Samuel Hoare retired in 1774 his place in the firm was replaced with his son, Jonathan Hoare, who was considered to be a disappointment as a merchant. Jonathan moved into "fast society" in a rather "un-Quakerly" fashion, becoming a close friend of the Price of Wales. This left more and more of the firm to be run by his cousin John Harman.

After the deaths Thomas Gurnell and Samuel Hoare Sr. The Harmans eased Jonathan Hoare out of the firm, which then became Harman & Co. Jonathan's other business ventures were also unsuccessful and he was eventually dependant on his brother Samual Hoare Jr.

After the death of John Harman in 1817, his son Jeremiah Harman would then become the sole principle partner until his death in 1846, at which time Harman and Co. would shortly after shut its doors in the hands of the two remaining patterns: Edward Harman and Henry Harman.

== Name Changes ==
- Jonathan Gurnell & Co., The firm was started by Jonathan Gurnell and was named after him for many years.
- Gurnell and Hoare c. 1750 - c. 1754 at Frederick Place in Old Jewry, London. Samuel Hoare Sr (1716–1796), son-in-law, was involved in the company from the beginning. When his grandson John Harman joined the firm, the name was changed to Gurnell, Hoare, and Harman.
- Gurnell, Hoare, Harman & Co. (Sometimes Gurnell, Hoare, and Harman or Gurnell, Hoare & Co) c.1754 - c. 1783 at Frederick Place in Old Jewry, London.
- Harman, Hoare, and Co. c.1786 - c.1792 at Frederick Place in Old Jewry, London
- Harman and Co. c.1804-1846 at Adam's Court of Old Broad Street, London. John's son Jeremiah Harman took over as a principal partner. He was a well-known banker, from 1816-1818 Governor of the Bank of England, and remained a partner of the firm until his death in 1844.
