= Girdle of Aphrodite =

Mythological vestment

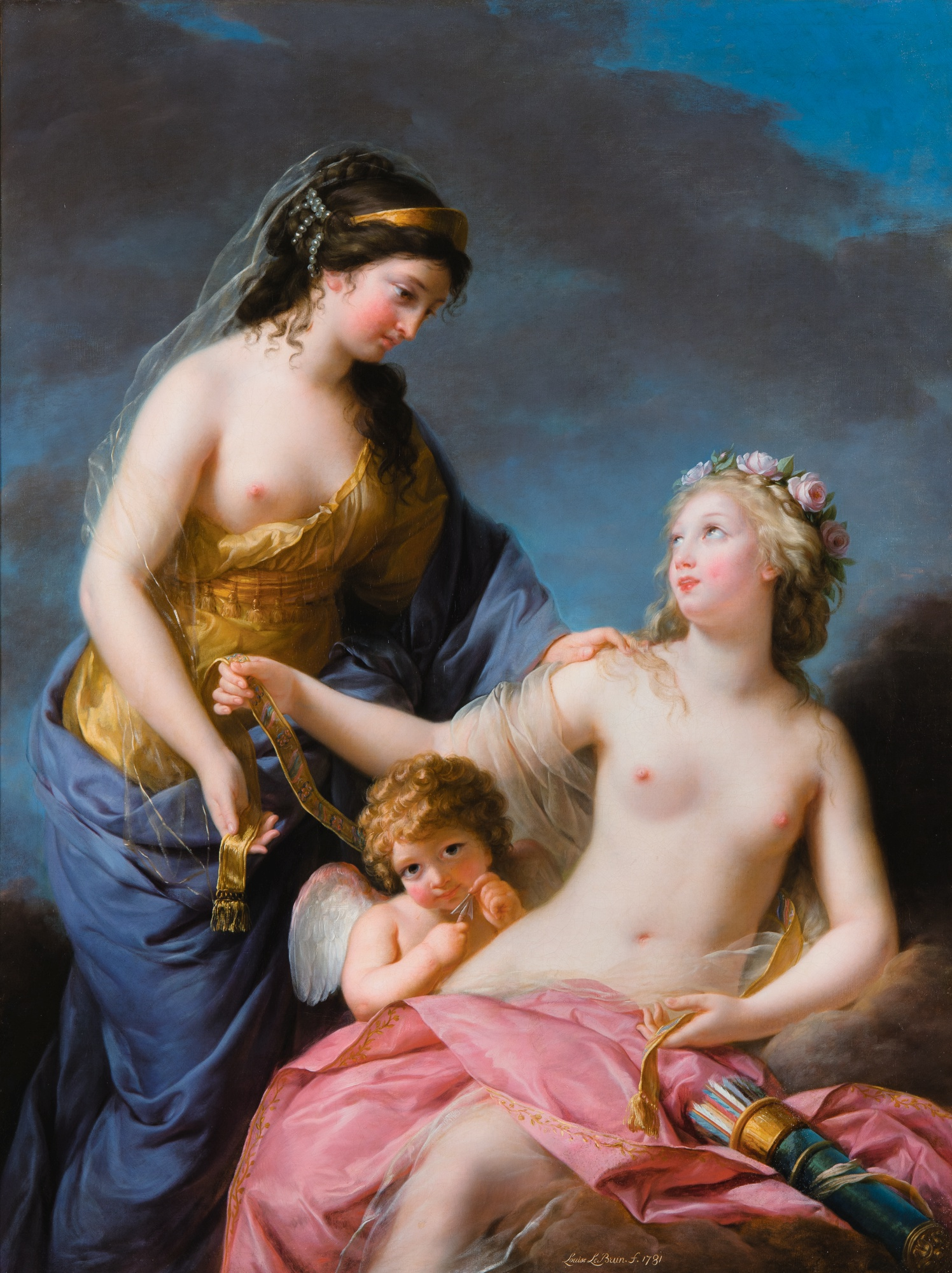
Juno Borrowing the Belt of Venus by Élisabeth Vigée Le Brun (1781)

The magical Girdle of Aphrodite or Venus (Greek: ἱμάς, himás: 'strap, thong'; κεστός, kestós: 'girdle, belt'; Latin: cingulum Veneri, cestus Veneris), variously interpreted as girdle, belt, breast-band, and otherwise, is one of the erotic accessories of Aphrodite, the Greek goddess of love and beauty. According to Homer, the girdle was imbued with the power to inspire the passion of desire in mortals and immortals alike. Hera, in her role as the goddess of marriage, sometimes borrowed it from Aphrodite to mitigate lovers' quarrels, to instigate the bridal contests of suitors, and on at least one occasion to manipulate her husband Zeus.

== Sources ==
=== Homer, Iliad 14.159–221 ===
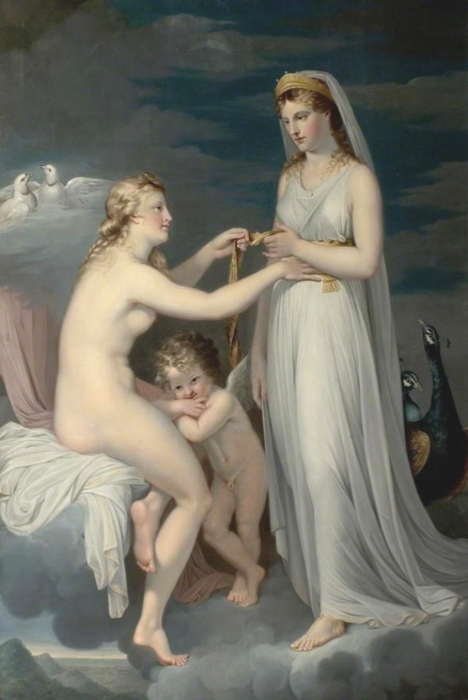
Juno Borrowing the Girdle of Venus by Guy Head (c. 1771)

The earliest mention of the girdle is in Book 14 of the Iliad, when its magical power is sought by Hera, who wants to seduce her husband Zeus, and has arrayed herself in all her finery, when she asks Aphrodite for "love and desire" (φιλότητα καί ἵμερον, philótēta kaí hímeron). Aphrodite immediately understands what she wants and gives her the magic girdle, her "broidered zone, curiously-wrought" (κεστὸν ἱμάντα ποικίλον, kestón himanta poikílon).

She spake, and loosed from her bosom the broidered zone, curiously-wrought, wherein are fashioned all manner of allurements; therein is love, therein desire, therein dalliance—beguilement that steals the wits even of the wise. This she laid in her hands, and spake, and addressed her: "Take now and lay in thy bosom this zone, curiously-wrought, wherein all things are fashioned; I tell thee thou shalt not return with that unaccomplished, whatsoever in thy heart thou desirest."

=== Other sources ===
The scant details of the Homeric account were supplemented and embellished by later authors.

- Apuleius, The Golden Ass 2.8.
- Coluthus, Rape of Helen 15, 155.
- Nonnus, Dionysiaca 3.400, 5.88, 32.10, 33.4, 41.20, 42.98, 42.378, 48.264.
- Antiphanes of Macedon, Greek Anthology 6.88.
- Photius, Bibliotheca 190.149a. Photius, citing Ptolemy Chennus, mentions the story that Aphrodite lent her magical embroidered band (kestos himas) to Helen, to ensure that Paris would fall in love with her: it was stolen by Helen's servant, Astyanassa, and recovered from her by Aphrodite.

== Interpretation ==
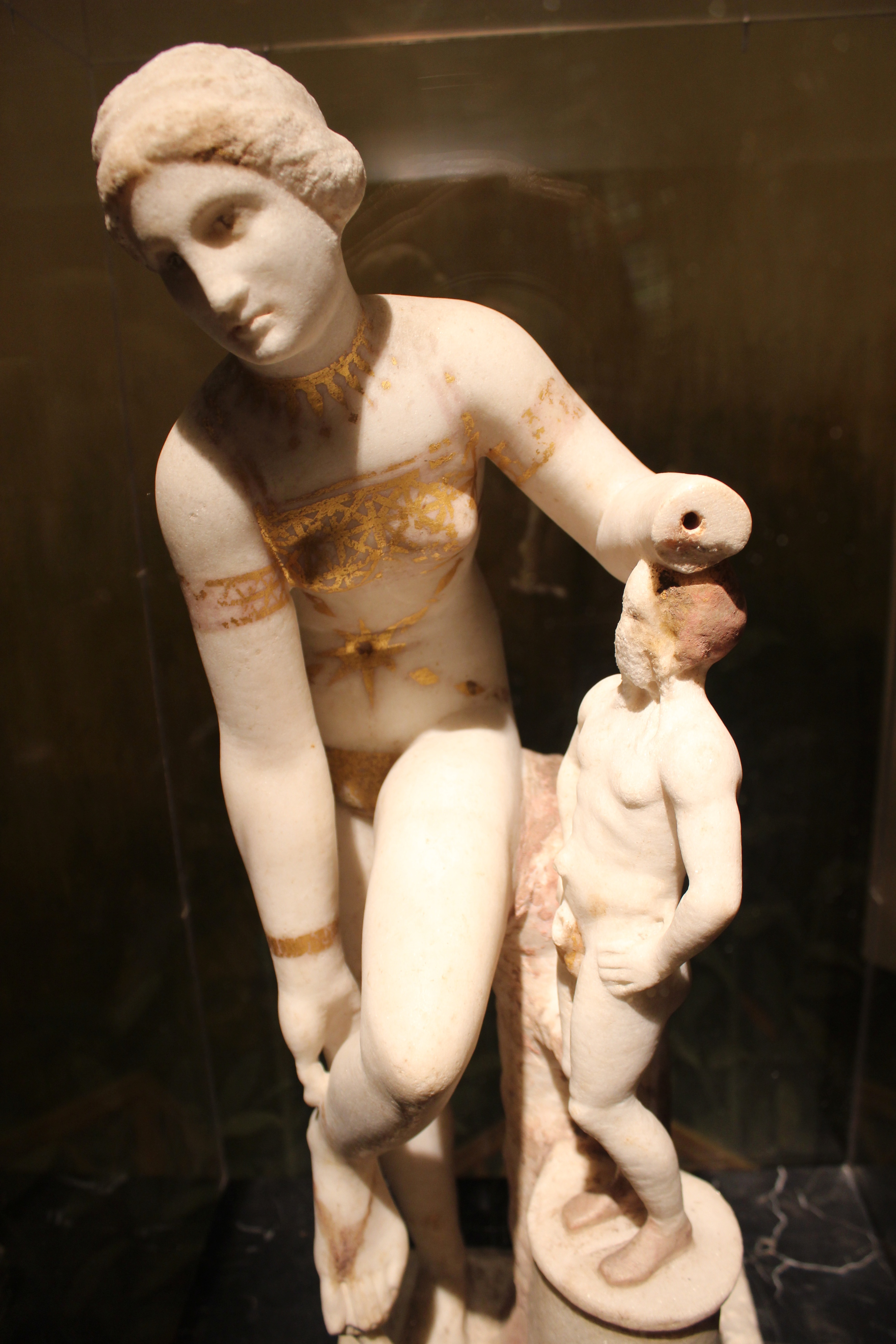
Venus in "bikini", statuette from Pompeii (c. 79 AD)

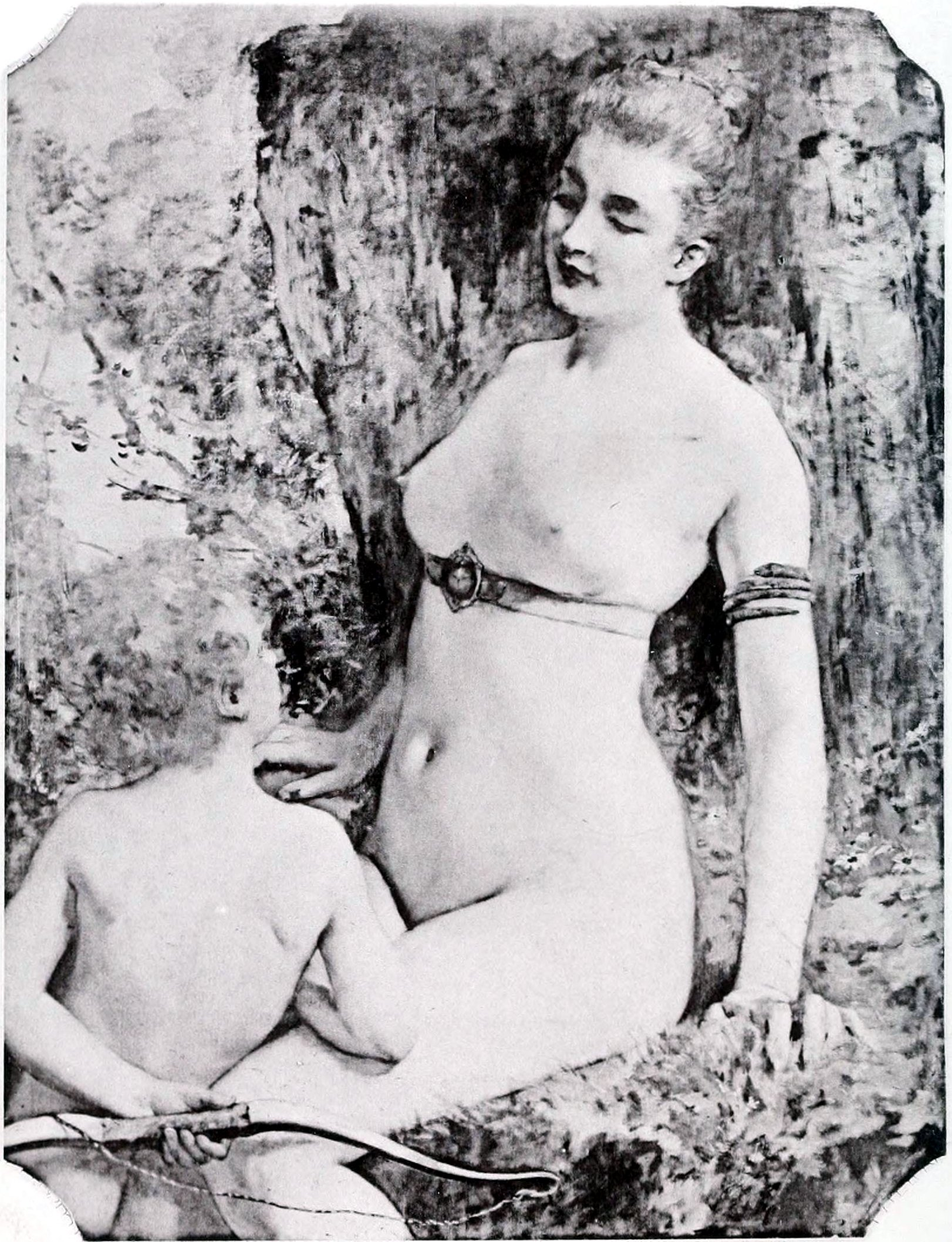
Vénus et l'Amour by Henri Gervex (c. 1911)

Homer's text suggests that the kestós himás, traditionally translated as "embroidered girdle", may be describing a kind of decorated breast-band (στρόφιον, stróphion), for Aphrodite advises Hera: "Take now and lay in thy bosom this zone". However, the way Hera wears it – as she seeks to outwit her husband in secret – does not necessarily have to match the usual way of wearing the belt. There is at least one example of late-Hellenic sculpture that seems to confirm this, depicting the goddess wrapping a stróphion (from stróphos "twisted band" + the diminutive suffix -ion) around her chest.

Count Du Mesnil du Buisson, in a study of the ornaments that appear on figures of Ishtar, Astarte, Atargatis, and Aphrodite, calls attention to a characteristic ornament consisting of two bands, each of which passes over a shoulder and under the opposite arm and together form a diagonal cross, which he calls sautoir ("saltire"). Depictions of saltires with cords, bands, knots, and tassels suggests magical properties, as these ornaments were sometimes thought to protect the wearer. Campbell Bonner argues a possible connection with the Homeric girdle, but also notes other theories.

Scholars disagree as to whether the magical object is interpreted as an embroidered textile or as a strip of leather embroidered with colourful textile elements.

Other ancient authors interpreted Aphrodite’s belt allegorically, and early Christian writers took mocking pleasure in the fact that even the supreme pagan god could be fooled by a magic belt.

== Reception ==
The Girdle of Venus was a common theme in the arts and literature of Europe, particularly during the Baroque and Neoclassical periods.

- Cestum Veneris habere, "possessing the girdle of Venus"; according to Lucian and Erasmus, literally "to be irresistible".
- Gürtel des Liebreizes, "belt of grace"; so called by Schiller in his philosophical essay On Grace and Dignity (1793), a detailed interpretation of the myth, emphasising the difference between beauty and grace: "The Greek myth attributes to the goddess of beauty a belt, possessed of the power to endow the one who wears it with grace, and to obtain love. ... All grace is beautiful, for the belt of grace is a property of the goddess of Gnidus; but not all that is beautiful is grace, for even without this belt, Venus remains what she is. ... Venus can take off her belt and momentarily relinquish it to Juno; her beauty she could surrender only with her person. Without her belt she is no longer the alluring Venus; without beauty she is no longer Venus at all."

== See also ==
- Aegis
- Hippolyta
  - Zoster (costume)
- History of bras
- Holy Girdle
- Girdle of Thomas

== Bibliography ==
- Atsma, Aaron J., ed. (2017). "Aphrodite Estate & Attributes", Theoi Project. Accessed 7 March 2022.
- Bender, K. (2014). "The girdle of Aphrodite-Venus...or was it her 'wonderbra'?", Iconography in Art History, Blogger. Retrieved 7 March 2022.
- Bonner, Campbell (1949), "ΚΕΣΤΟΣ ΙΜΑΣ and the Saltire of Aphrodite", The American Journal of Philology, The Johns Hopkins University Press, 70(1): 1–6.
- Schiller, Friedrich (1992). On Grace and Dignity. Translated by George Gregory. Schiller Institute, Inc. (Original work published 1793).
- Schopphoff, Claudia (2009). Der Gürtel. Funktion und Symbolik eines Kleidungsstücks in Antike und Mittelalter [The Belt: Function and Symbolism of a Garment in Antiquity and the Middle Age]. Pictura et poesis, vol. 27. Cologne/Weimar: Böhlau, ISBN 978-3-412-20226-2.
- Speyer, Wolfgang (1981). "Gürtel" [Belt]. In: Reallexikon für Antike und Christentum. vol. 12. Stuttgart: Hiersemann, ISBN 3-7772-8145-X, col. 1232–1266.
