= Thomas Hope (designer) =

Dutch-British writer, philosopher, and banker

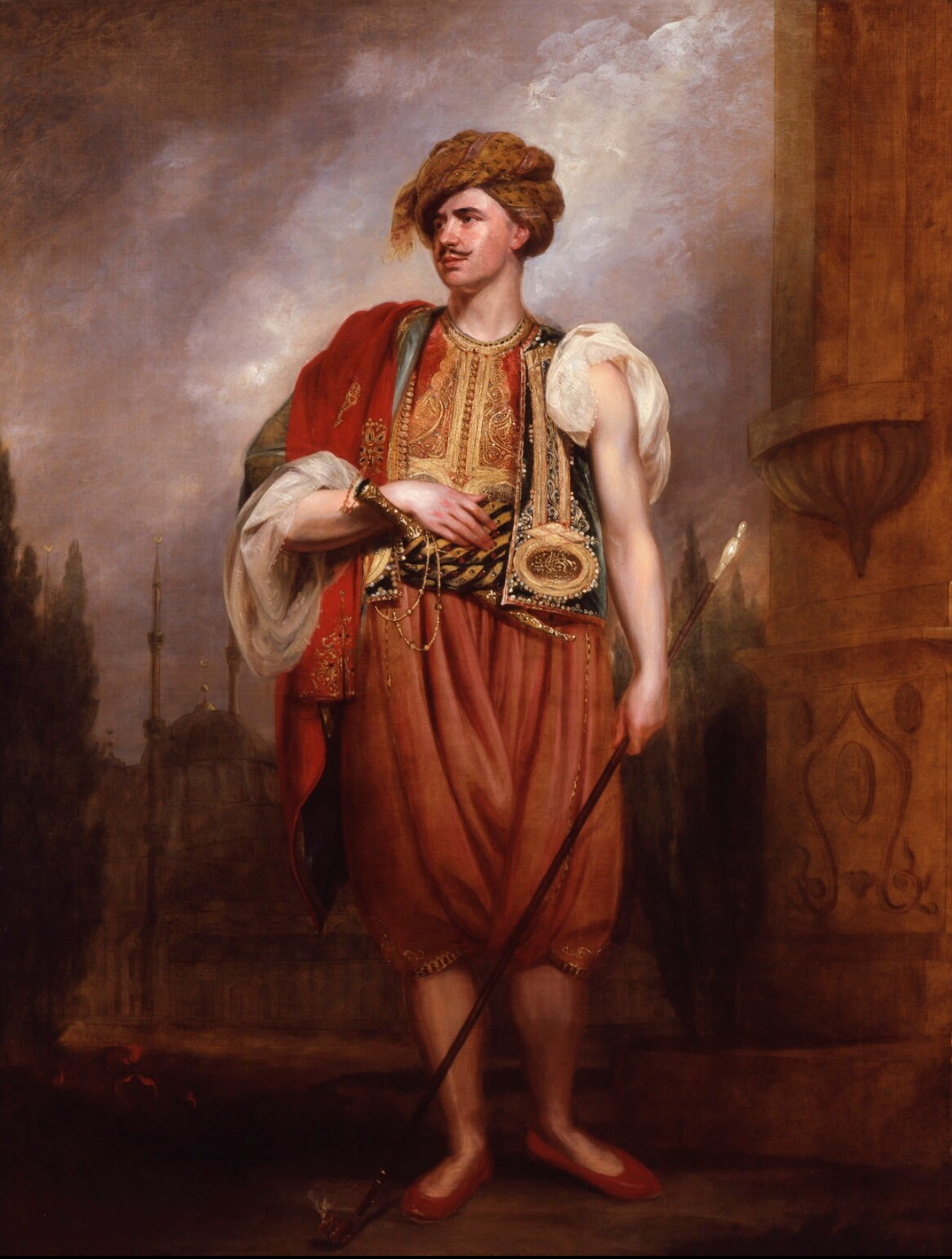
- William Beechey (1798) Portrait of Thomas Hope
- Born: 30 August 1769; Amsterdam, Dutch Republic
- Died: 2 February 1831 (aged 61); Duchess Street, London, England
- Spouse: Louisa Hope (m. 1806)
- Children: 4, including: Henry Thomas Hope; Alexander Beresford Hope
- Father: Jan Hope
- Relatives: Henry Philip Hope (brother); William Beresford, 1st Baron Decies (father-in-law); Henry Hope (cousin); Thomas Hope (grandfather)
- Family: Hope family

Thomas Hope (30 August 1769 – 2 February 1831) was a Dutch-British interior and Regency designer, traveler, author, philosopher, art collector, and partner in the banking firm Hope & Co. He is best known as an early promoter of Greek Revival architecture and for his novel Anastasius.

Born in Amsterdam, he fled to London after the French Revolution spread to the Netherlands, leaving a large part of his art collection behind.

== Early life and family ==
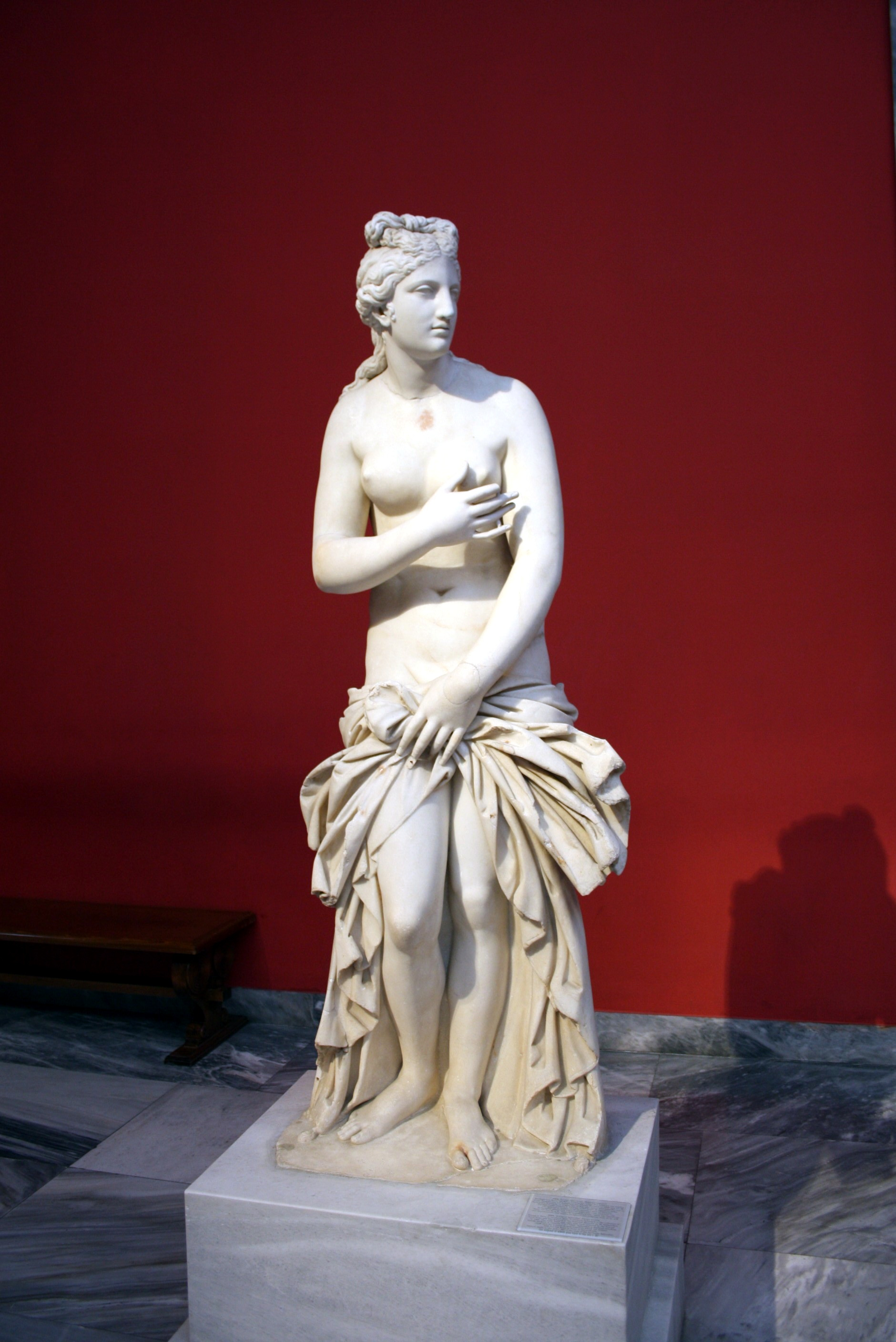
Hope Venus (Syracuse Aphrodite) in National Archaeological Museum, Athens

Hope was born on 30 August 1769 in Amsterdam, in the then Dutch Republic (present-day Netherlands) to a Dutch mother and a Dutch father of Scottish descent. His father, Jan Hope, was a partner and merchant banker at Hope & Co, and his mother, Philippina Barbara van der Hoeven (c. 1738–1789), was the daughter of the Burgomaster of Rotterdam. The eldest of three brothers, Hope was the brother of Adrian Elias Hope (1772–1834) and the art and gem collector Henry Philip Hope. Painted alongside his siblings by Willem Joseph Laquy in 1773, Hope was possibly painted by Guy Head during the artists visit to Amsterdam in 1780.

Hope inherited a love of the arts from his parents. His father spent his final years turning his summer home, Groenendaal Park in Heemstede, into a grand park of sculpture which would be open to the public.

== Grand tour ==
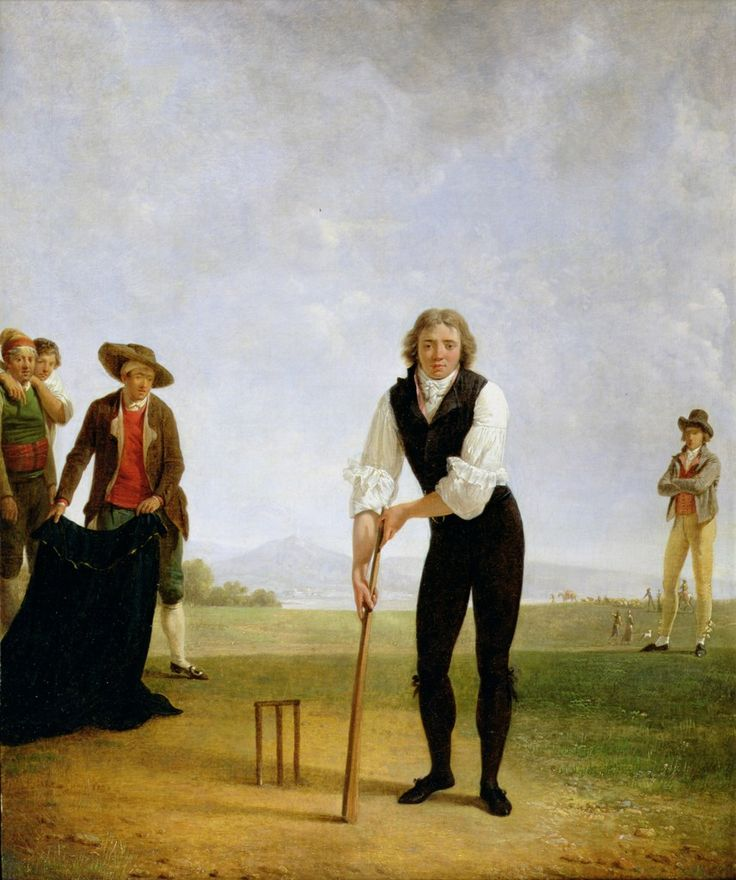
Mr. Hope of Amsterdam playing cricket; by Jean-François Sablet in Rome (1792).

In 1784, when Thomas was fifteen, his father died unexpectedly in the Hague right after purchasing Bosbeek, the mansion that would later house his large art collection. He shared his art collection as part of the Hope & Co. partnership with his cousin Henry Hope.

At the age of eighteen, Thomas began to devote most of his time to the study of the arts, especially classical architecture. During his eight-year grand tour through Europe, Asia and Africa, Thomas became especially interested in architecture and sculpture, collecting a large collection of artifacts that attracted his attention (e.g. the Hope Dionysus).

Not long after his mother died in early January 1790, Thomas received the rights and liabilities of a person of full age and was admitted to the board of the Hope company. He owned almost a sixth of the shares, and instantly became a millionaire. Between 1792 and 1794 he and Henry Philip traveled in Italy, buying antiquities (Venus, restored by Antonio Canova).

Henry Hope was the executor of their mother's will in June 1794; Thomas received the largest and most expensive mansion on Herengracht. On 24 December 1794 he crashed in the Watergraafsmeer with another chaise. (On 27, the French general Pichegru crossed the Meuse on the ice and moved north.) Within a few weeks, he fled to London to avoid the Batavian Revolution and the French occupation of the Netherlands and never returned.

== Escape to London ==
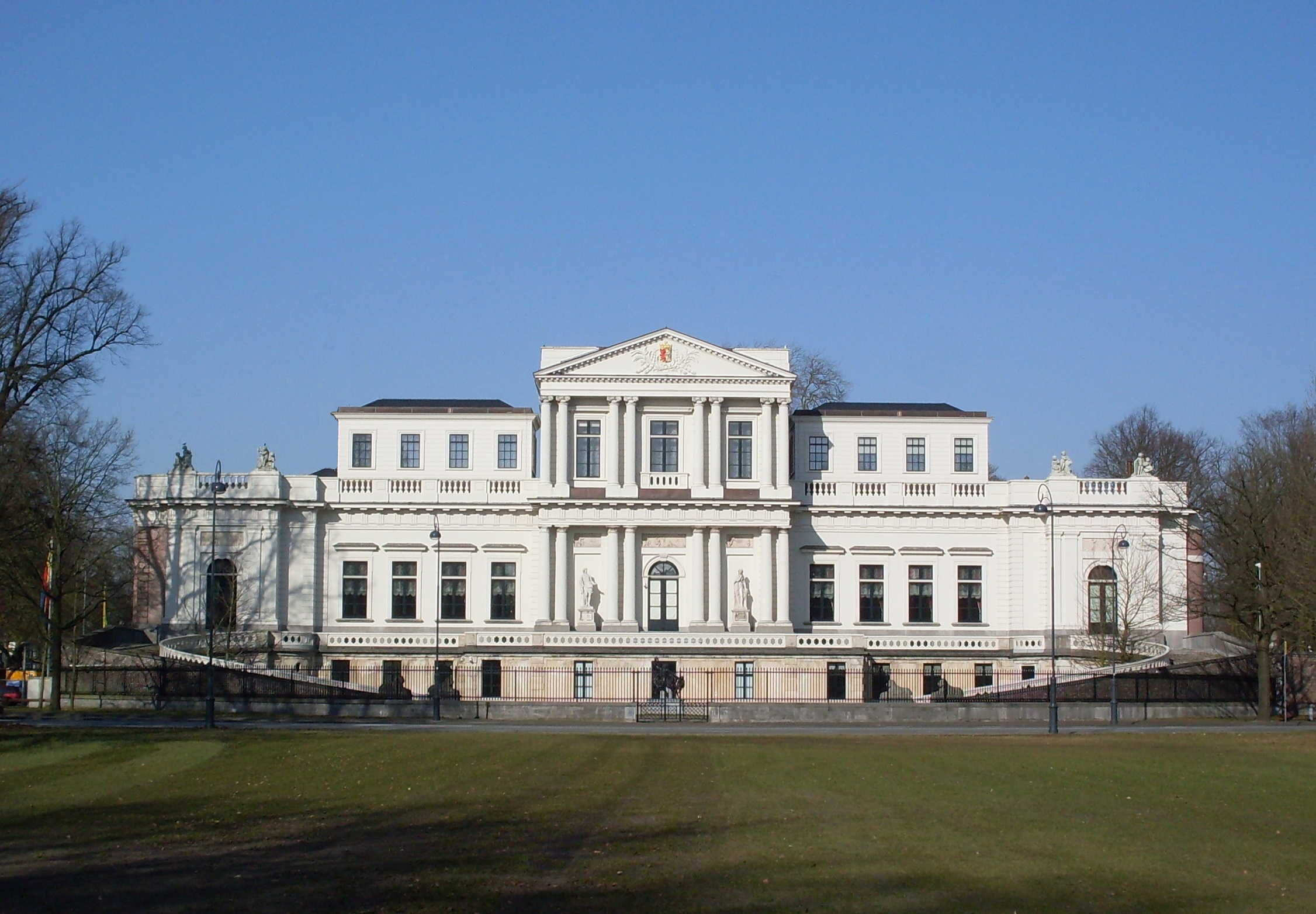
Villa Welgelegen

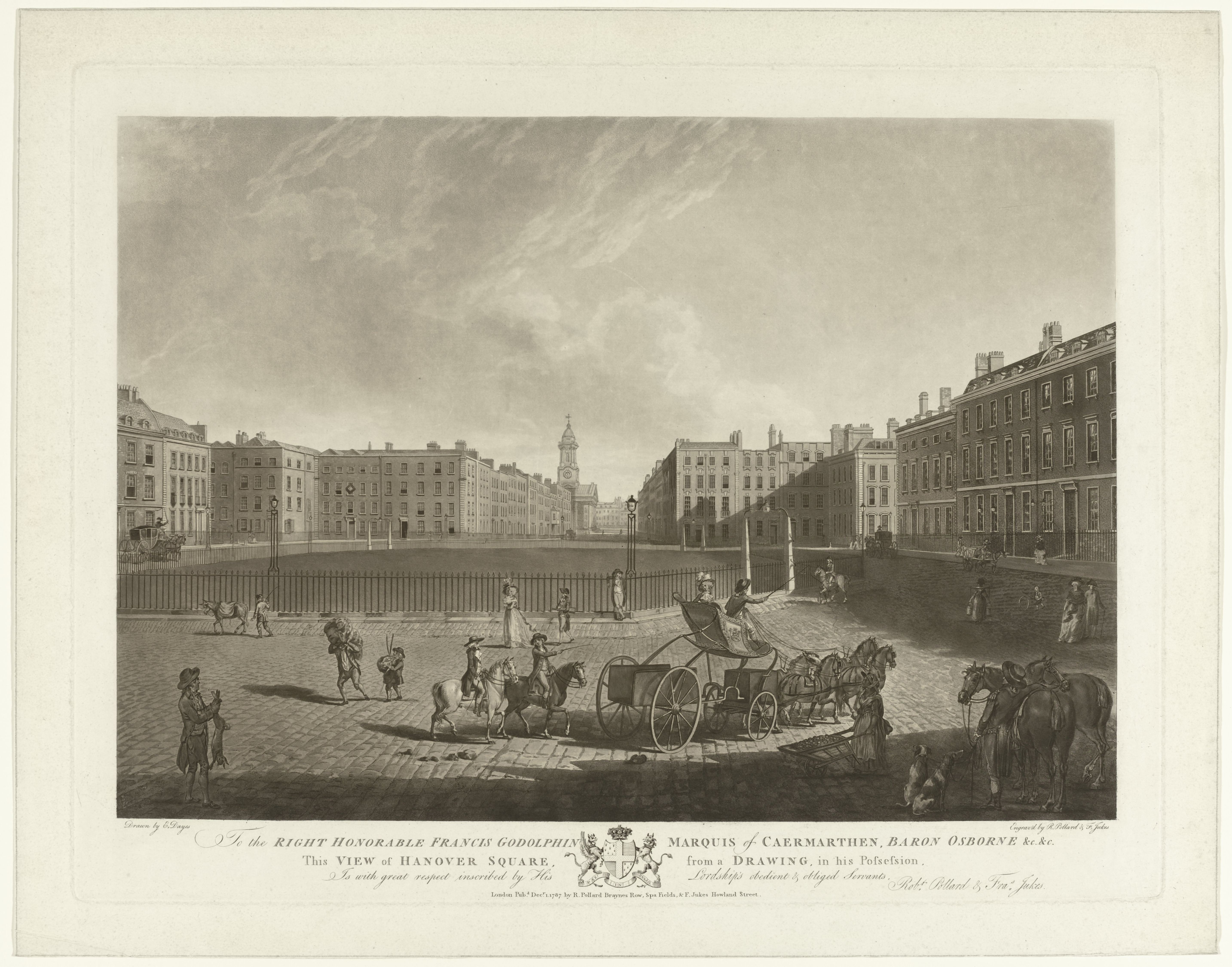
Hanover Square

The Hope brothers, under the protection of their uncle, took 372 paintings with them. Among these were important works by Frans Hals, Peter Paul Rubens, Rembrandt and Sir Anthony van Dyck.

The Hopes left their mansions, full of wall decorations, furniture, and heavy statuary. Henry settled at the corner of Harley Street and Cavendish Square, Thomas at Hanover Square. Later in 1795, the brothers went to Rome.

In 1802, their younger brother, Adrian Elias, who had been declared insane, would return to live at Groenendaal Park and expand the gardens. The brothers sold the real estate at Keizersgracht and Prinsengracht to John Williams Hope. Henry also sold Villa Welgelegen to this fiduciary, who continued to hold that office until the establishment of the monarchy under Louis Bonaparte in 1806.

== Career as an interior decorator ==
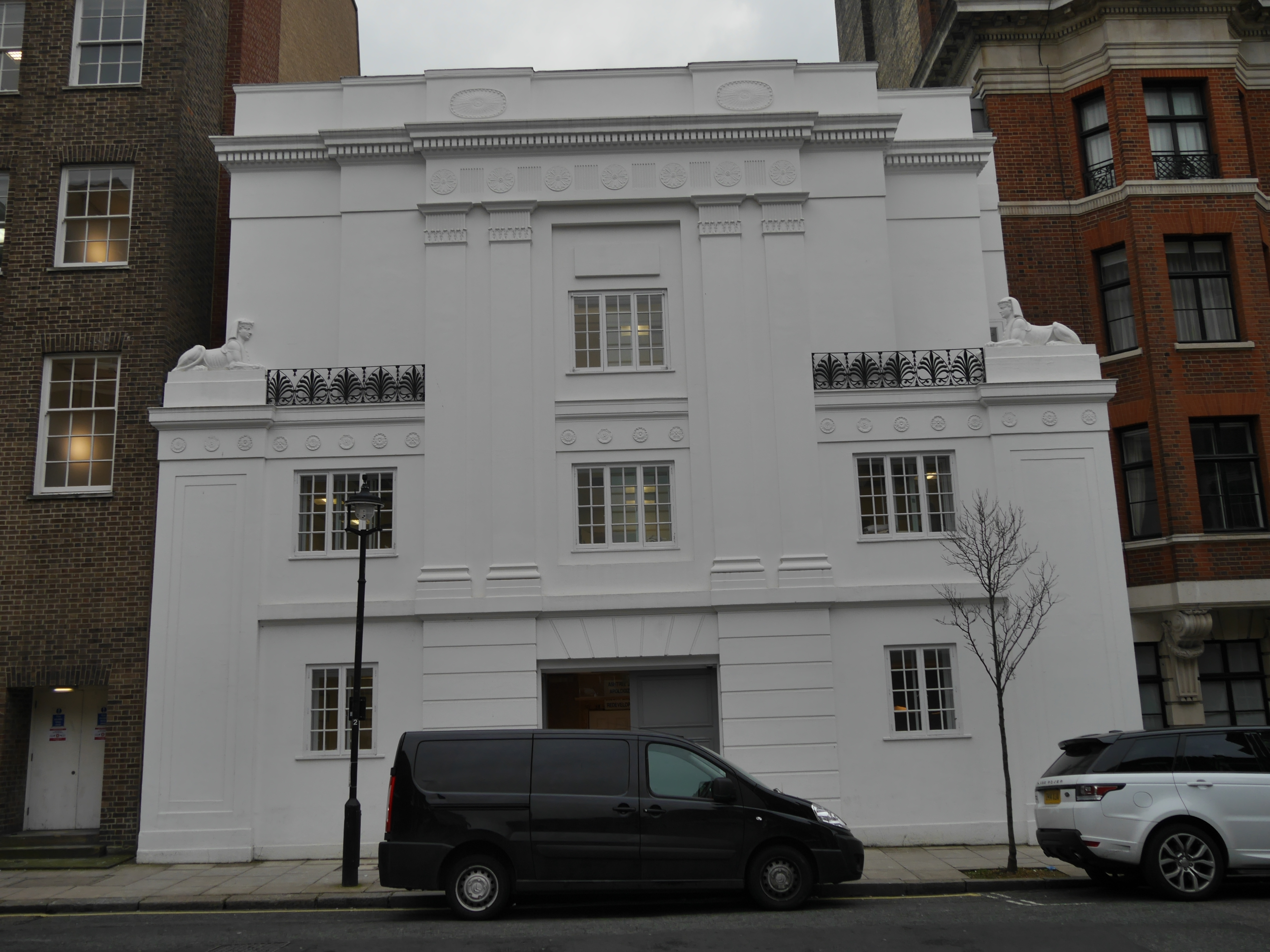
Thomas Hope's house, 10 Duchess Street, London

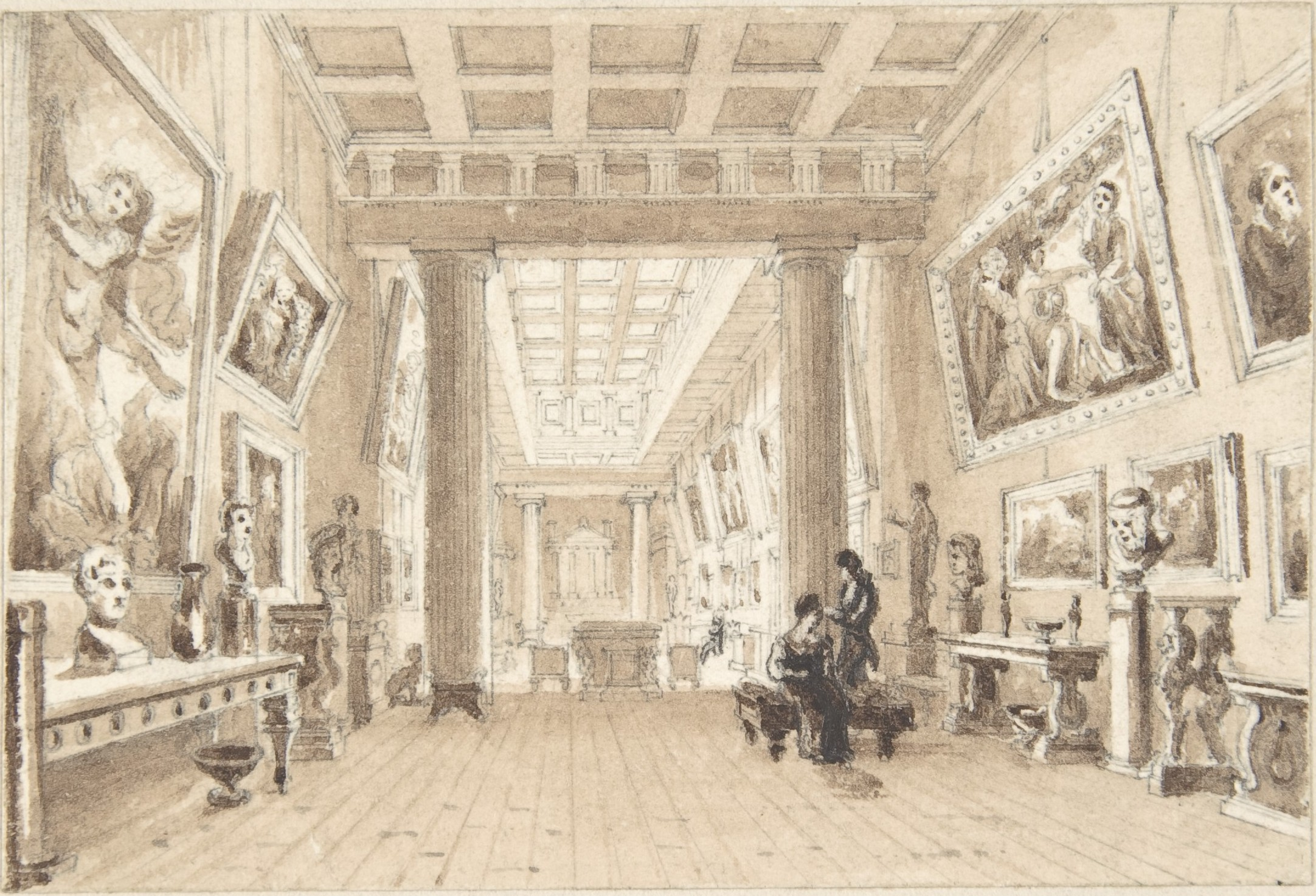
Interior of Thomas Hope's Picture Gallery, Duchess Street, London

In 1799, the Hopes established a residence in London in Duchess Street, off Portland Place, designed by Robert Adam. Thomas remodeled it in an Egyptian style. Experienced from his extensive travel, Thomas Hope enjoyed the cosmopolitan atmosphere of London, while his younger brothers missed their home in the Netherlands. He decorated the mansion in a very elaborate style, from drawings made himself with each room taking on a different style influenced by the countries he had visited. In essence, the combined art collections of Hope & Co., his parents and Henry Hope gave him the opportunity to further research the various art he had studied during his travels. Thomas began to write books on decoration and furniture, the first of its kind.

In this eclectic wealthy residence of bachelors, younger brother Henry Philip oversaw the gem collection (acquiring the Hope Diamond and the Hope Pearl), while cousin Henry busied himself with the banking business and the Louisiana Purchase, together with Barings. Thomas Hope did not settle in London, however. He took up his grand tour where he left off, and in 1796 he began his extensive tours of the Ottoman Empire, which included visits to Turkey, Rhodes, Egypt, Syria, and Arabia. He stayed for about a year in Constantinople and produced some 350 drawings depicting the people and places he witnessed, a collection now to be found in the Benaki Museum, Athens.

In 1801, he bought a collection of Greek vases from William Hamilton. During these travels, he was given free rein by the Hope & Co. firm to collect many paintings, sculptures, antique objects and books, some of which were destined to be displayed for the public in Amsterdam in the branch offices on Keizersgracht 444, and some of which were destined for his London house in Duchess Street in 1804.

During the Treaty of Amiens he started to travel again. In 1803, he ordered Jason with the Golden Fleece, a sculpture by Thorvaldsen in Copenhagen City Hall, included in the semi-official Danish Culture Canon. Thomas Hope first opened his new galleries to the public, on 10 February 1804.

The Egyptian Gallery, a private room in the home of Thomas Hope to display his Egyptian antiquities, and illustrated in engravings from his meticulous line drawings in his book Household Furniture (1807), were a prime source for the Regency style of British furnishings.

== Marriage and move to Deepdene ==
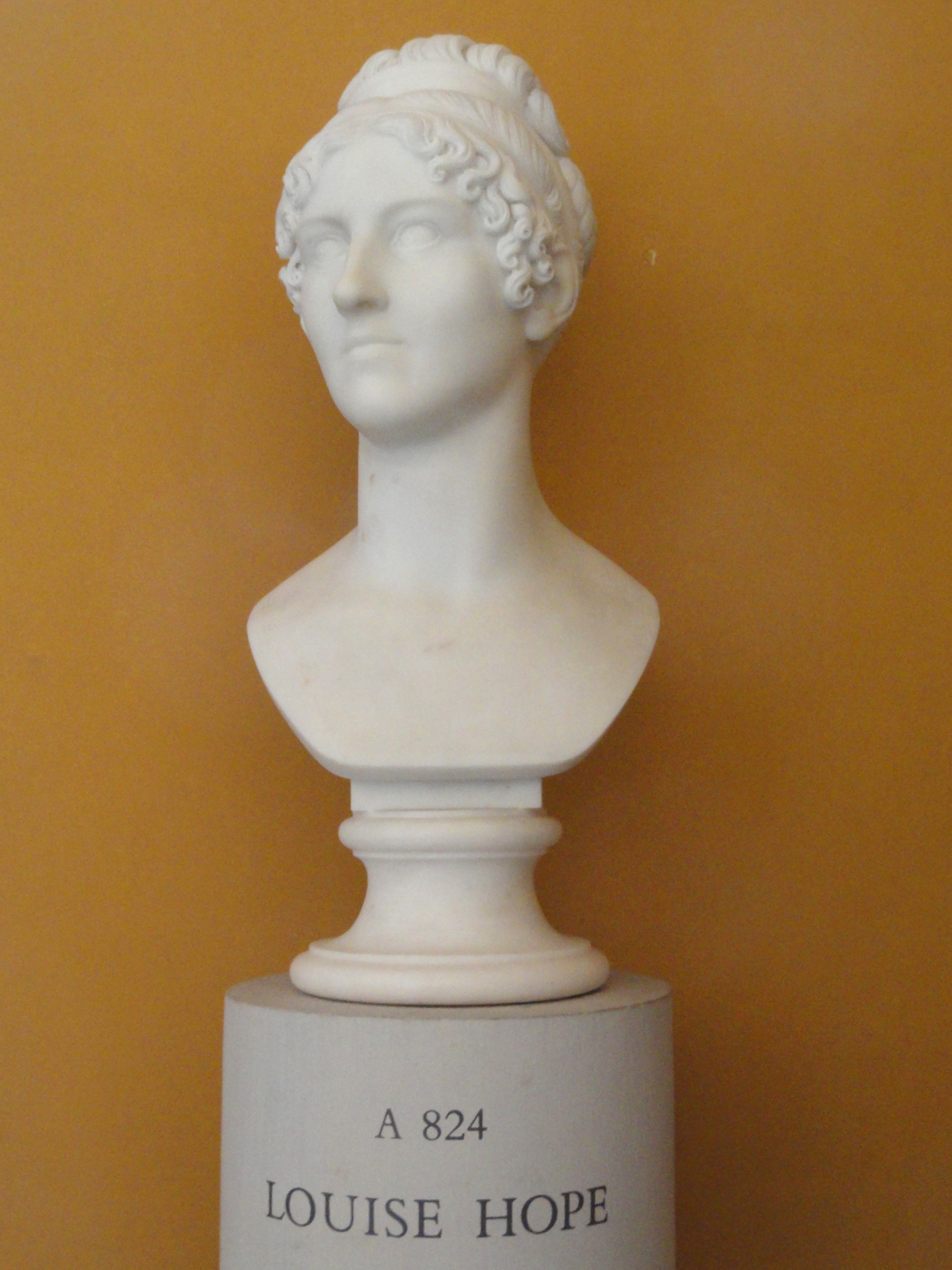
Louisa Hope: bust by Bertel Thorvaldsen (1817)

After his marriage to Louisa de la Poer Beresford (daughter of William Beresford, 1st Baron Decies) in 1806, Hope acquired a country seat at Deepdene, near Dorking in Surrey. Here, surrounded by his large collections of paintings, sculptures and antiques, Deepdene became a famous resort of men of letters as well as of people of fashion. Among the luxuries suggested by his fine taste, and provided to his guests, was a miniature library in several languages in each bedroom.

He also gave frequent employment to artists, sculptors and craftsmen. Bertel Thorvaldsen, the Danish sculptor, was indebted to him for the early recognition of his talents. He was also a patron to Francis Legatt Chantrey and John Flaxman; it was to his order that the latter illustrated the writings of Dante Alighieri. He developed the gardens in a particular version of picturesque style.

Hope was noted for his snobbery and ugliness, one contemporary describing him as "undoubtedly far from the most agreeable man in Europe. He is a little ill-looking man…with an effeminate face and manner." When the French painter Antoine Dubost exhibited a portrait of him titled "Beauty and the Beast", portraying him as a monster offering his wife jewels, it caused a public scandal: the painting was mutilated by Louisa's brother. A further scandal arose in 1810 when Hope took up with a beautiful young Greek sailor, Aide, and attempted to launch him into Society.

Hope was the father of Henry Thomas Hope, art patron and politician and Alexander James Beresford Beresford Hope, author and politician.

== Writing ==
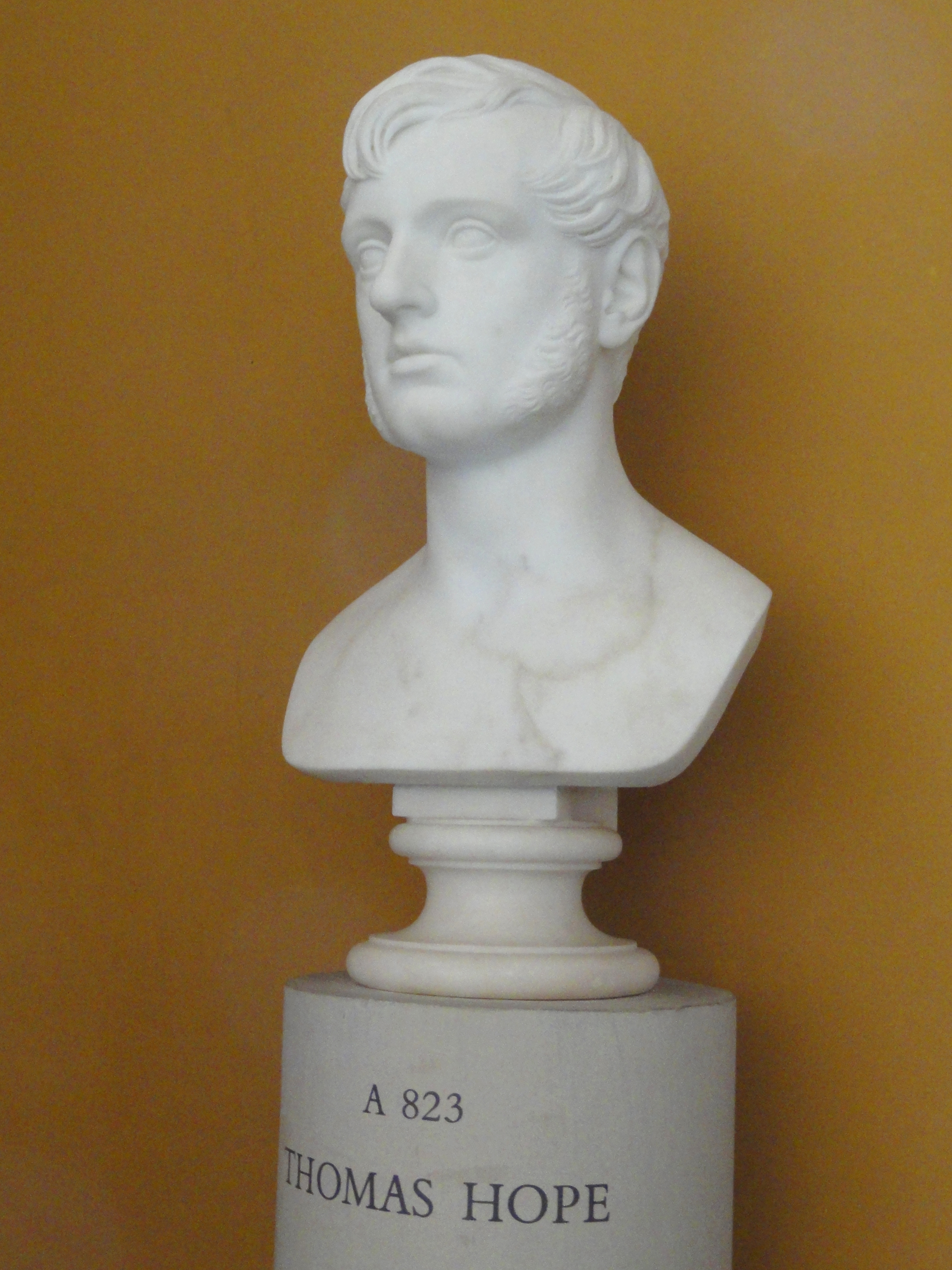
Bust of Thomas Hope at Thorvaldsens Museum.

Hope was eager to advance public awareness of historical painting and design and to influence design in the grand houses of Regency London. In pursuit of his scholarly projects, he began sketching furniture, room interiors and costumes, and publishing books with his accompanying scholarly texts.

In 1807 Thomas Hope published sketches of his furniture, in a folio volume, titled Household Furniture and Interior Decoration, which had considerable influence and brought about a change in the upholstery and interior decoration of houses. Hope's furniture designs were in the pseudo-classical manner generally called "English Empire". It was sometimes extravagant, and often heavy, but was much more restrained than the wilder and later flights of Thomas Sheraton in this style.

In 1809 he published the Costumes of the Ancients, and in 1812 Designs of Modern Costumes, works which display a large amount of antiquarian research. A Historical Essay on Architecture, which featured illustrations based on early Hope drawings, was published posthumously by his family in 1835. Thus Hope became famous in London's aristocratic circles as 'the costume and furniture man'. The sobriquet was regarded as a compliment by his enthusiastic supporters, but for his critics, including Lord Byron, it was a term of ridicule.

- 1807: Household Furniture and Interior Decoration. Faksimile-Neuausgabe 1937.
- 1809: Costumes of the Ancients.
- 1812: Designs of Modern Costumes.
- 1819: Anastasius: or, Memoirs of a Greek; Written at the close of the Eighteenth Century.
- 1831: Origin and Prospect of Man.
- 1835: Historical Essay on Architecture.

=== Anastasius ===
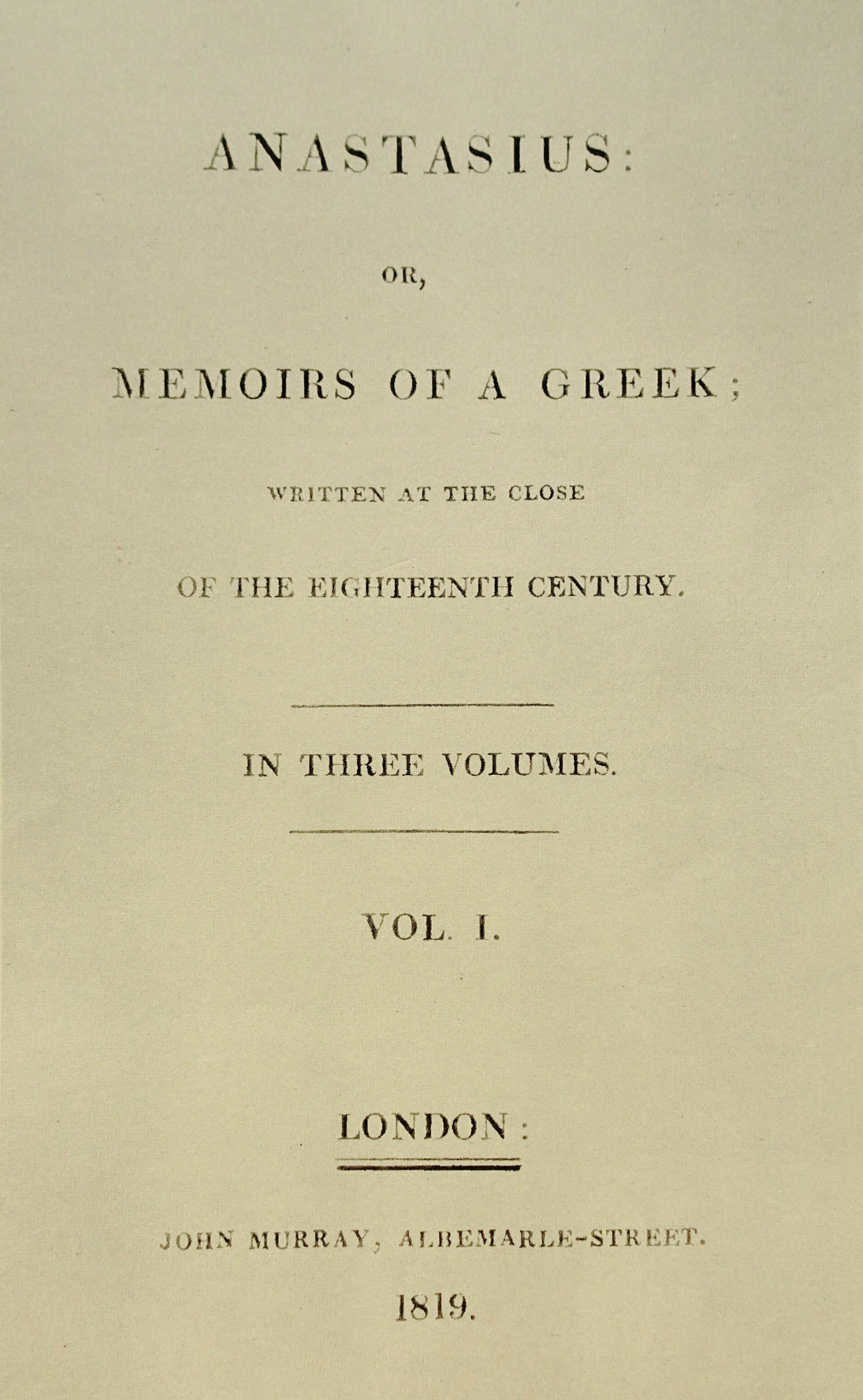
Cover of the first edition (1819)

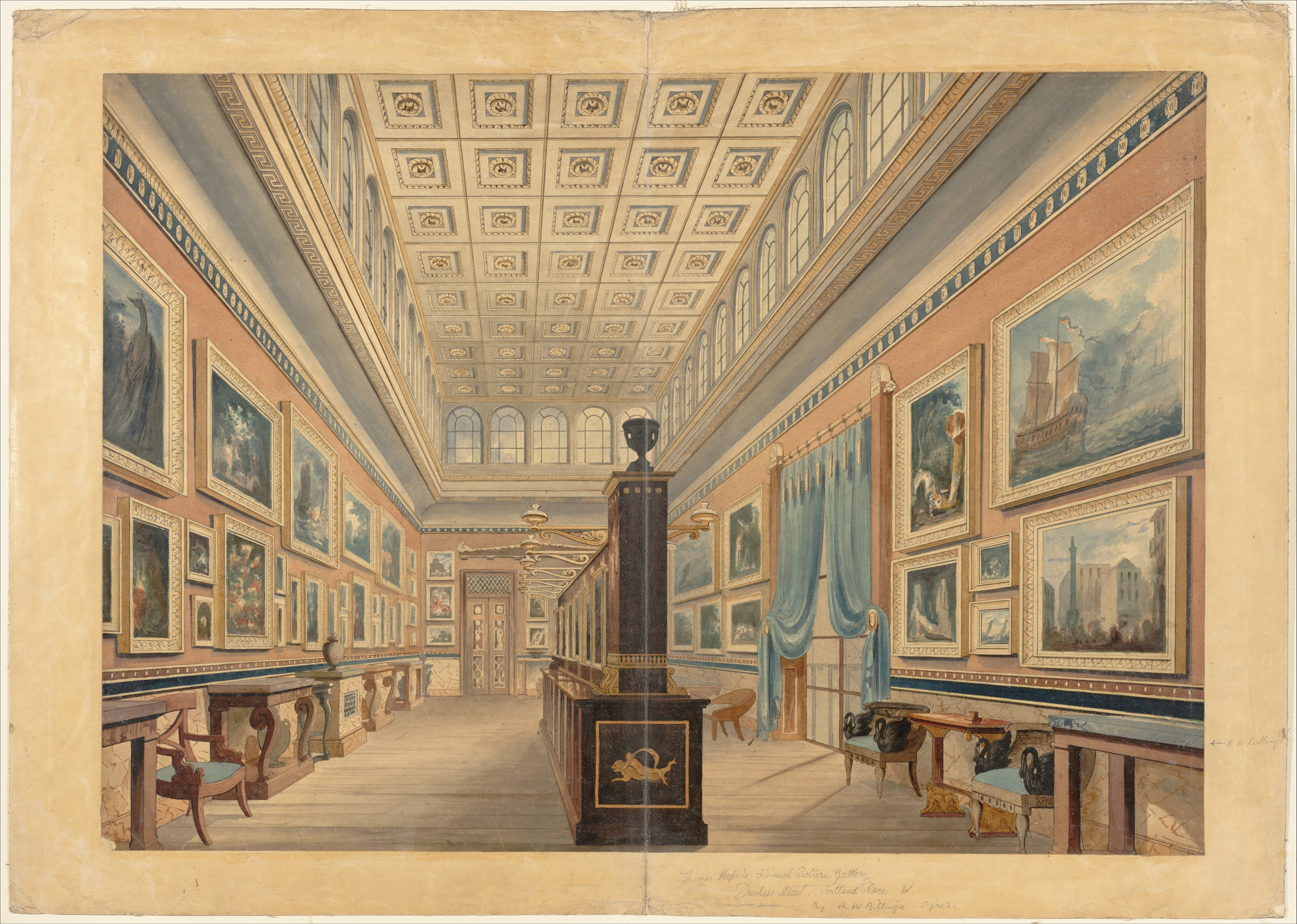
The Flemish Picture Gallery, the Mansion of Thomas Hope, Duchess Street, Portland Place

At age fifty, Hope began work on a novel at the suggestion of a few friends. The first edition of Anastasius was complete in 1819 and was published by London publisher John Murray. It received foreign translations into French, German and Flemish.

The novel's narrator-hero Anastasius describes his own adventures as a converted Muslim mercenary, Selim, who travels the Ottoman Empire and fights wars among the Turks, Russians and Wahabees. The novel provided details of Islamic music, cuisine, religion, laws, and literature that were unfamiliar to English readers at the time.

Hope chose to have Anastasius published anonymously at first. The authorship was at first mistakenly attributed to Lord Byron, who, according to legend, confided to Marguerite, Countess of Blessington, that he wept bitterly on reading it. "To have been the author of Anastasius, I would have given the two poems which brought me the most glory." These events prompted Hope to reveal his identity as author in later editions, adding a map of Anastasius's travels and fine-tuning the text, although his authorship was initially greeted with incredulity by some journals.

Soon after Hope's death in 1831, his widow Louisa remarried her cousin William Carr Beresford, 1st Viscount Beresford. His family thereafter embraced conservative values, causing them to authorise the demolition of the writer's legendary London home, disperse his fabled art collection, and distance themselves from his Oriental masterpiece. No substantial collection of Hope's personal papers survived the family indifference and Anastasius, his magnum opus, became a victim of the sanctimonious morality of the Victorian age.

Nevertheless, it influenced the later works of William Thackeray, Mark Twain and Herman Melville. More recently, the noted Orientalist Robert Irwin wrote, "this book, one of the most important books of the nineteenth century, should be much more widely read."

In addition to his other accomplishments, Hope was the author of an important philosophical work published posthumously, The Origin and Prospect of Man (1831), in which his speculations diverged widely from the social and religious views of the Victorian age. This volume, which has been cited by the philosopher Roger Scruton, was a highly eclectic work and took a global view of the challenges facing humanity.

In his obituary published in The Mirror of Literature, Amusement, and Instruction Volume 17, No. 476, Saturday, 12 February 1831, it was written, "We remember the opinion of a writer in the Edinburgh Review, soon after the publication of Anastasius. With a degree of pleasantry and acumen peculiar to northern criticism, he asks, 'Where has Mr. Hope hidden all his eloquence and poetry up to this hour? How is it that he has, all of a sudden, burst out into descriptions which would not disgrace the pen of Tacitus, and displayed a depth of feeling and vigor of imagination which Lord Byron could not excel? We do not shrink from one syllable of this eulogy.'"

Hope is commonly known among literary circles as "Anastasius Hope".

== Death and legacy ==
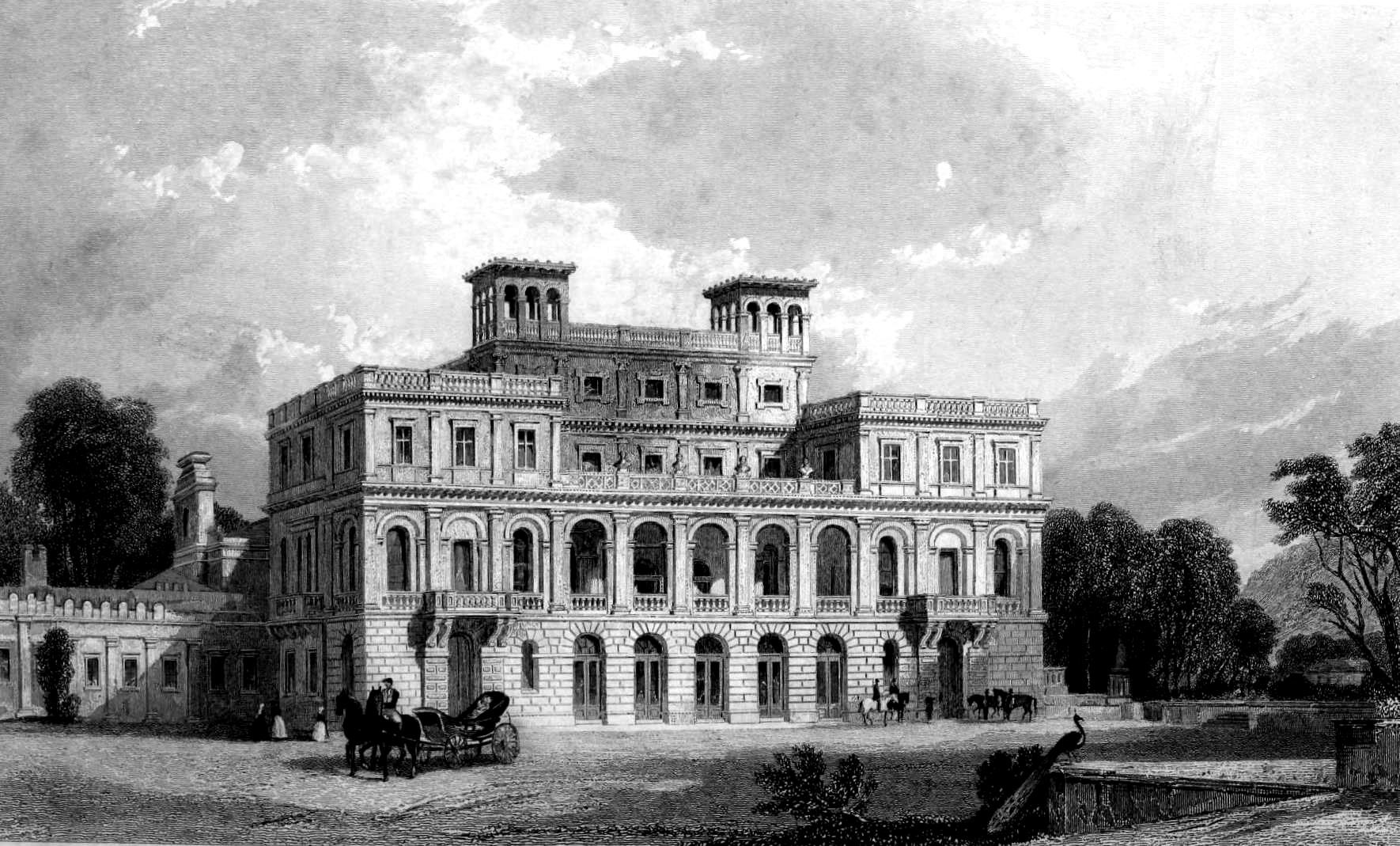
Deepdene House (1850)

In early 1831, Hope fell ill. He died on 2 February at Duchess Street and was laid to rest on 12 February in the mausoleum at Deepdene.

The two mansions Hope created have been lost; that in Duchess Street was demolished by his son in 1851 and Deepdene in 1969. The only complete surviving structure built by Hope is the Deepdene mausoleum. Built in 1818, the structure was the first recorded work at Deepdene. It was permanently sealed in 1957 and buried in 1960. The Mausolea and Monuments Trust has been working with Mole Valley District Council to rescue the structure and is running a campaign to excavate and repair it.

The principal elevation was excavated in 2013, with further restoration in 2016.

== Sources ==
- The Beechey Portrait – A Visual Study of "Anastasius" by John Rodenbeck
- Thomas Hope – Triumph, Tragedy, Obverse Worlds by Jerry Nolan
- A Political Study of Anastasius by Ludmilla Kostova
- Hope's Philosophical Excursus by Roger Scruton
- Anastasius – Towards Background and Meaning by John Rodenbeck
- Sándor Baumgarten – Hope's Forgotten Champion by Jerry Nolan
- Catalogue of the valuable library of books on architecture, costume, sculpture, antiquities, etc., formed by Thomas Hope, Esq., author of "The costume of the ancients," "Anastasius, or memoirs of a Greek," etc., etc.; being a portion of the Hope Heirlooms removed from Deepdene, Dorking; the property of Lord Francis Pelham Clinton Hope : which will be sold by auction ... on Wednesday, 25 July 1917 and two following days.
