= Epistle to the Laodiceans =

Possible writing of Paul the Apostle

The Epistle to the Laodiceans is a possible writing of Paul the Apostle, the original existence of which is inferred from an instruction in the Epistle to the Colossians that the congregation should send their letter to the believing community in Laodicea, and likewise obtain a copy of the letter "from Laodicea" (Greek: ἐκ Λαοδικείας, ek Laodikeas).

And when this letter has been read among you, have it read also in the church of the Laodiceans; and see that you read also the letter from Laodicea.

— Colossians 4:16 (NRSV)

This letter is generally regarded as being lost. However, some ancient sources, such as Hippolytus of Rome, and some modern scholars consider that the epistle "from Laodicea" was never a lost epistle, but rather Paul re-using one of his other letters (the most common candidate is the canonical Epistle to the Ephesians), just as he asks for the copying and forwarding of the Letter to Colossians to Laodicea. An additional complication is that many scholars do not believe that Colossians was itself written by Paul, in which case the indicated letter might itself not be Pauline even if it existed.

At least two ancient texts claimed to be the missing "Epistle to the Laodiceans" are known to have existed. These are generally considered, both in antiquity and by modern scholarship, to be attempts to supply a forged copy of a lost document. The sole version that survived is a Latin Epistola ad Laodicenses ("Epistle to the Laodiceans"), first witnessed in Codex Fuldensis. The Latin epistle is actually a short compilation of verses from other Pauline epistles, principally Philippians. It too is generally considered a "clumsy forgery" and an attempt to fill the "gap" suggested by Colossians 4:16. Despite this, it was part of medieval Bibles in the Western, Latin church for centuries, with it only becoming clearly non-canonical after it was rejected by both the Protestant reformers and the Catholic Council of Trent in the early modern era.

== Mention in Colossians 4:16 ==
Paul, the earliest known Christian author, wrote several letters (or epistles) in Greek to various churches. Paul apparently dictated all his epistles through a secretary (or amanuensis), but wrote the final few paragraphs of each letter by his own hand. Many survived and are included in the New Testament, but others are known to have been lost. The Epistle to the Colossians, which is traditionally attributed to Paul, includes a seeming reference to a presumably Pauline letter in the possession of the church at Laodicea. An interlinear gloss of Colossians 4:16 reads as follows:

Καὶ ὅταν ἀναγνωσθῇ παρ’ ὑμῖν ἡ ἐπιστολή ποιήσατε ἵνα καὶ ἐν τῇ Λαοδικέων ἐκκλησίᾳ ἀναγνωσθῇ καὶ τὴν ἐκ Λαοδικείας ἵνα καὶ ὑμεῖς ἀναγνῶτε.
Kaí ótan anagnosthí par’ ymín i epistolí poiísate ína kaí en tí Laodikéon ekklisía anagnosthí kaí tín ek Laodikeías ína kaí ymeís anagnóte.
And when {may be read} among you, the epistle, cause that also in the {[of] the Laodiceans} assembly {it may be read}, and that from Laodicea that also ye {may read.}
After this letter has been read to you, see that it is also read in the church of the Laodiceans and that you in turn read the letter from Laodicea. (NIV translation)

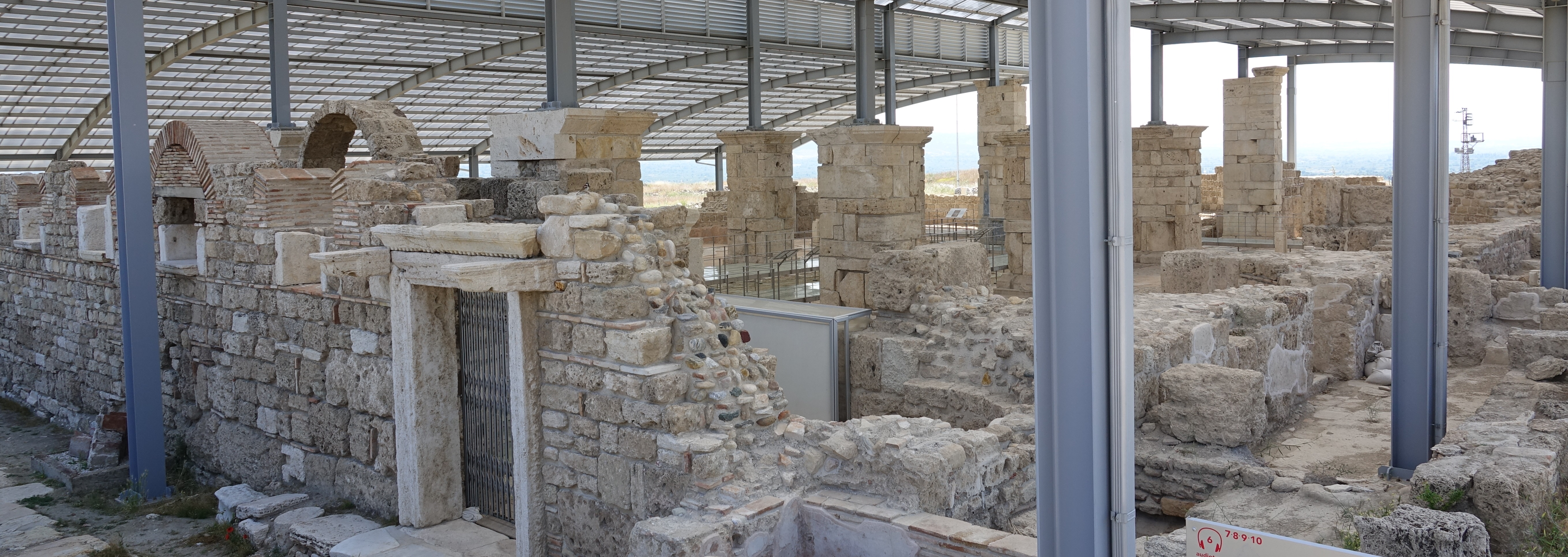
Church remnants in Laodicea on the Lycus

The last words can be interpreted as "letter written to the Laodiceans", but also "letter written from Laodicea". The New American Standard Bible (NASB) translates this verse in the latter manner, and a few translations in other languages also translate it likewise, such as the Dutch Statenvertaling: "When this letter is read among you, have it also read in the church of the Laodiceans; and you, for your part read my letter (that is coming) from Laodicea." Those who read here "letter written to the Laodiceans" that, at the time that the Epistle to the Colossians was written, Paul also had written an epistle to the community of believers in Laodicea. It could also perhaps be interpreted as Paul recommending a letter produced by the Laodicean community, not himself.

Another possibility exists: that no such epistle to the Laodiceans was ever created, despite the verse in Colossians. Colossians is considered a deutero-Pauline work by many scholars (meaning a letter written in Paul's name by an associate or someone else), based on a number of differences in writing style and assumed situation from Paul's earlier letters. While this is explained by some as due to increasing use of a secretary (amanuensis) later in Paul's life, a more skeptical approach is to suggest that Colossians was not written by Paul at all. If Colossians was forged in Paul's name, then the reference to the other letter to the Laodiceans could merely be a verisimilitude—a small detail to make the letter seem real. The letter would never have been sent to Colossae in this scenario, but rather used as an example of Paul's doctrine to win a theological dispute far from Colossae, and there would be nobody to recognize that the claimed letter to the Laodiceans was non-existent.

== Identification with canonical epistles ==
=== Epistle to the Ephesians ===
Some scholars have suggested that it refers to the canonical Epistle to the Ephesians, contending that it was a circular letter (an encyclical) to be read to many churches in the Laodicean area. Others dispute this view.

=== Epistle to Philemon ===
Others have suggested that it refers to the canonical Epistle to Philemon.

== Works purporting to be the lost text ==
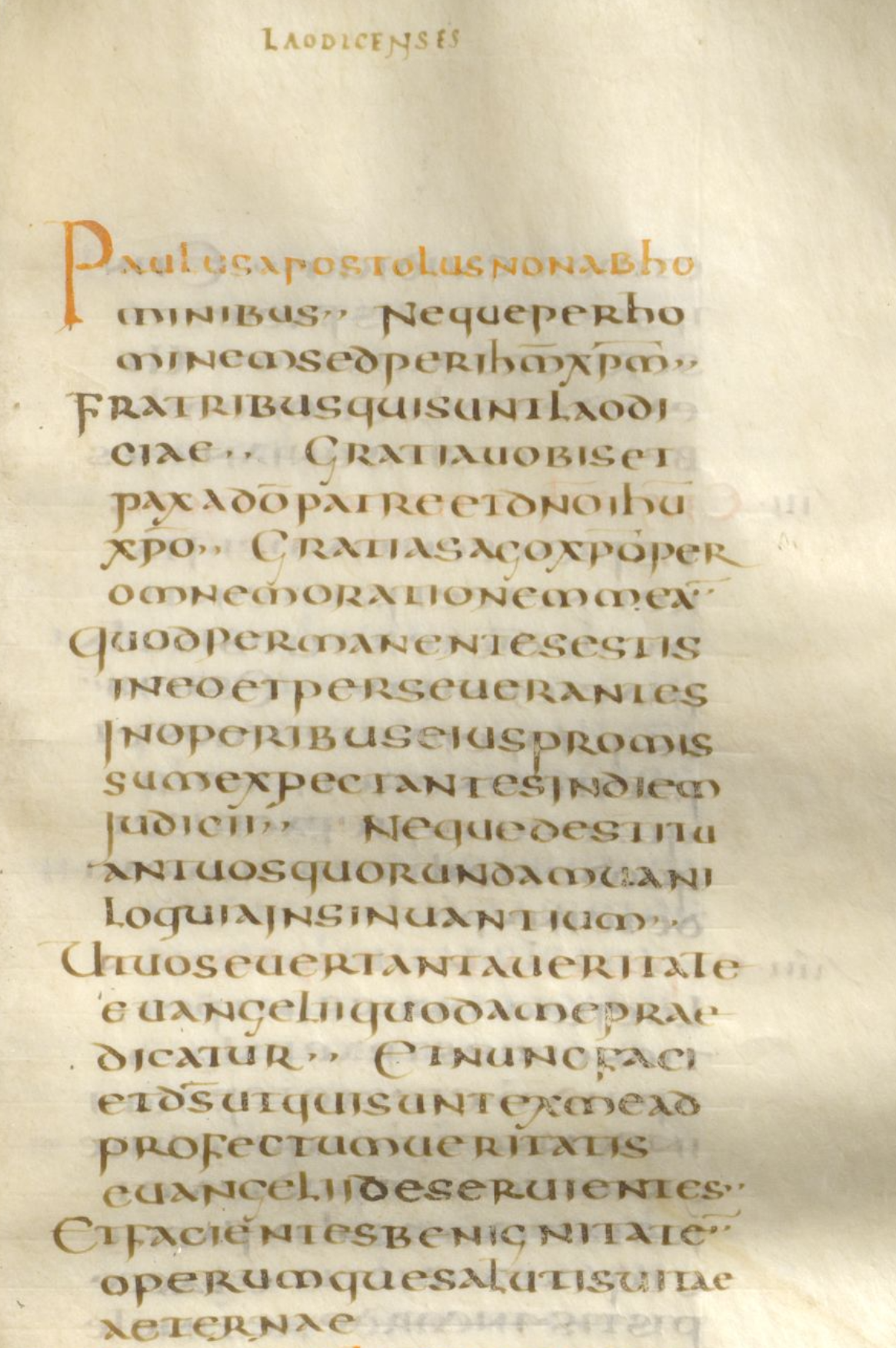
The top half of the first page of the Latin Epistle to the Laodiceans in the Fulda manuscript

=== Marcionite Epistle to the Laodiceans ===
...there is current also (an epistle) to the Laodiceans, another to the Alexandrians, forged in Paul's name for the sect of Marcion, and several others, which cannot be received in the catholic Church; for it will not do to mix gall with honey.

— Muratorian Canon

According to the Muratorian fragment, Marcion's canon contained an epistle called the Epistle to the Laodiceans which is commonly thought to be a forgery written to conform to his own point of view. This is not at all clear, however, since none of the text survives. It is not known what this letter might have contained. Most scholars believe it was explicitly Marcionist in its outlook, hence its condemnation.

Others believe it to be the Epistle to the Ephesians; the proto-Orthodox author Tertullian accuses Marcion's group of using an edited version of Ephesians which was referred to as the Epistle to the Laodiceans.

=== Latin Vulgate Epistle to the Laodiceans ===
A claimed Epistle to the Laodiceans from Paul exists in Latin. It is quite short at only 20 verses. It is mentioned by various writers from the fourth century onwards, notably by Pope Gregory the Great; the oldest known copy of this epistle is in the Fulda manuscript written for Victor of Capua in 546. Possibly due to Gregory's endorsement of it, many Western Latin Bibles contained this epistle for centuries afterward. Pre-modern Arabic and Slavonic translations were created from the Latin text. It also featured in early English Bibles: John Wycliffe included Paul's letter to the Laodiceans in his Bible translation from the Latin to English. Medieval German Bibles included it as well, until it was excluded from the Luther Bible in the 1500s. However, the epistle is essentially unknown in Eastern Christianity, where it was never used or published; the Second Council of Nicea of 787 rejected it. There is no evidence of a Greek text, the language Paul wrote in. The text was almost unanimously considered pseudepigraphal when the Christian Biblical canon was decided upon, and does not appear in any Greek copies of the Bible at all, nor is it known in Syriac or other versions. Jerome, who wrote the Latin Vulgate translation, wrote in the 4th century, "it is rejected by everyone".

Scholars are unanimous in concurring with Jerome and believing this epistle forged long after Paul's death. Additionally, the epistle is derided for having no theological content. It includes Pauline greetings and farewells, but does not appear to have any substantive content: it does not address any problem or advocate for any position. Rudolf Knopf and Gustav Kruger wrote that the epistle is "nothing other than a worthless patching together of [canonical] Pauline passages and phrases, mainly from the Epistle to the Philippians." M. R. James wrote that "It is not easy to imagine a more feebly constructed cento of Pauline phrases." Wilhelm Schneemelcher was "amazed that it ever found a place in Bible manuscripts." However, it evidently gained a certain degree of respect, having appeared in over 100 surviving early Latin copies of the Bible. According to Biblia Sacra iuxta vulgatam versionem, there are Latin Vulgate manuscripts containing this epistle dating between the 6th and 12th century, including Latin manuscripts F (Codex Fuldensis), M, Q, B, D (Ardmachanus), C, and Lambda.

The apocryphal epistle is generally considered a transparent attempt to supply this supposed lost sacred document. Some scholars, such as Wolfgang Speyer, suggest that it was created in response to the Marcionite epistle; it would be easier to reject the Marcionite version if the "real" Epistle to the Laodiceans could be provided to counter it.

An obvious question is if the Latin epistle and the Marcionite epistle are actually the same document: is it possible that the Muratorian fragment was referring to an early version of the Latin epistle? While the occasional scholar advocates for this (Adolf von Harnack for one), most scholars consider this unlikely, because the Latin epistle does not include any Marcionite theology or character.
