= Magic item (disambiguation) =

A magic item is an object that has magical powers.

Magic item may also refer to:

- Magic item (Dungeons & Dragons)
- Magical objects in Harry Potter
