= Hope Dionysus =

Marble statue of Dionysos

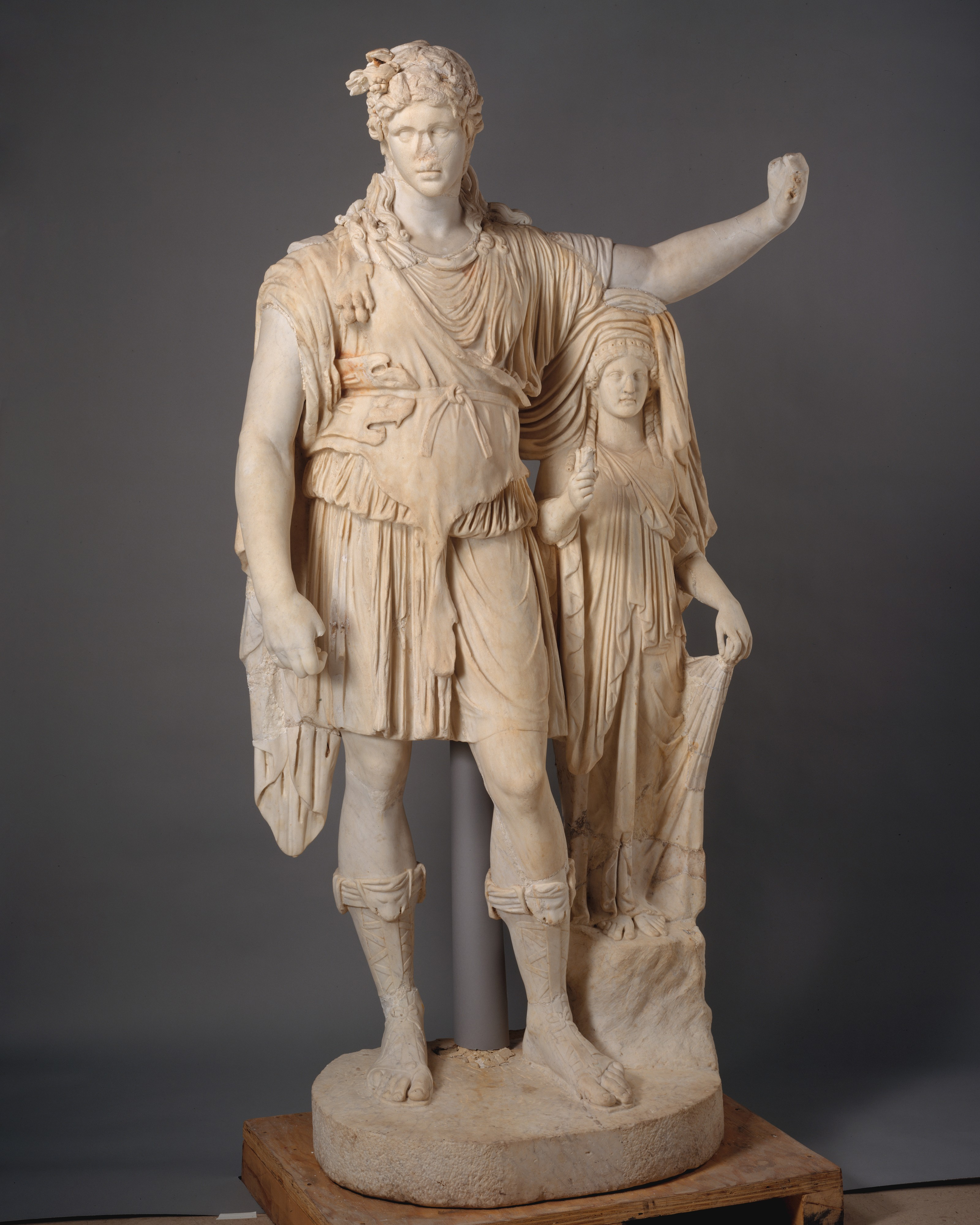
Statue of Dionysos leaning on a female figure ("Hope Dionysos")

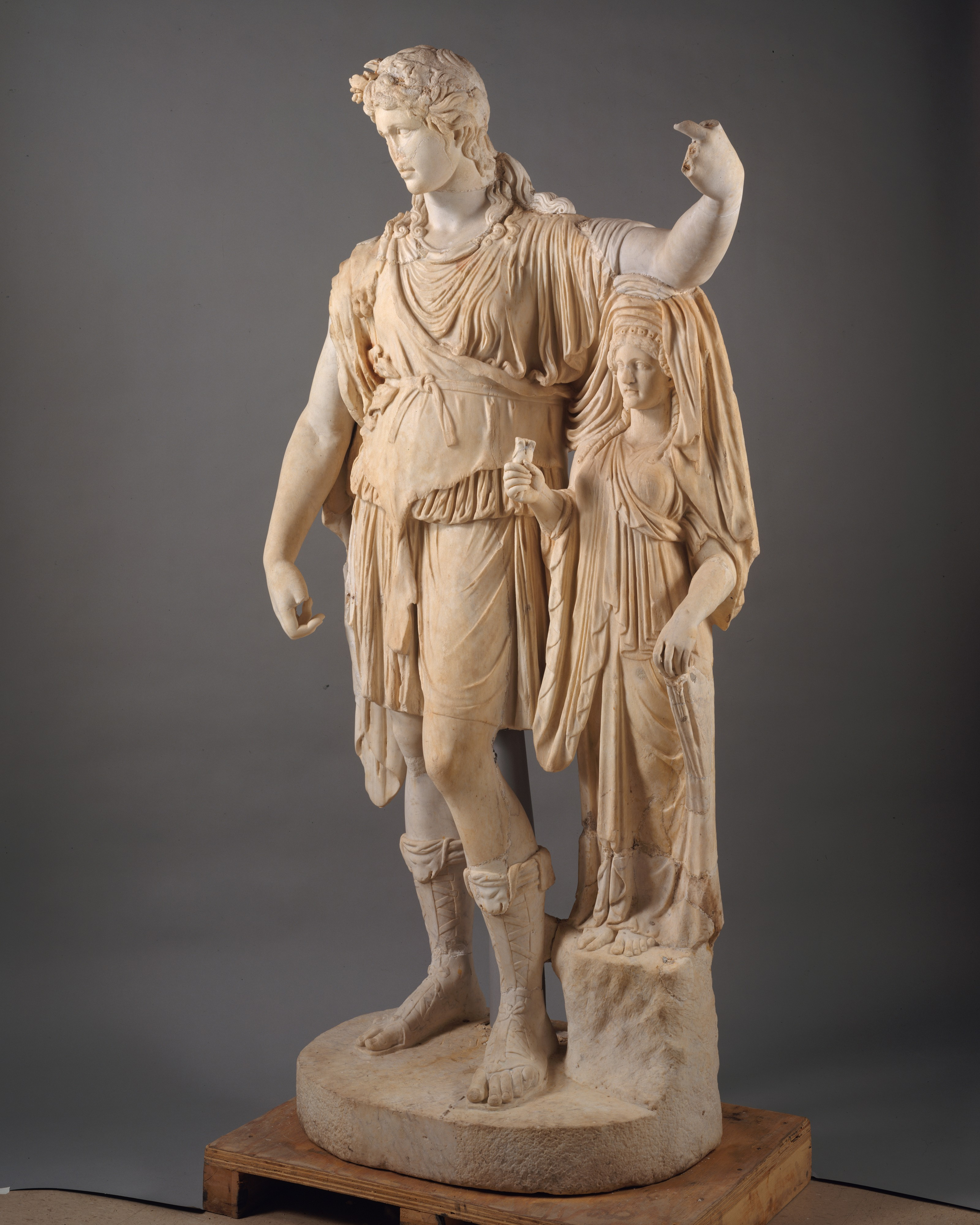
Another view

The Hope Dionysus is a statue of Dionysus, the god of wine, wearing a panther skin and casually stretching his left arm over a smaller figure of a woman, in a Neo Attic or archaic pose. This woman is believed to represent Spes, the Roman personification of Hope.

This statue, 82 1/4 in. (2.1 m) high, dates to between 27 BC and 68 AD. It was once owned by the 18th-century British antiquities collector Thomas Hope (hence the name), and later belonged to a descendant of Benjamin Franklin, before being acquired by the Metropolitan Museum of Art in 1990.
