= Astyanassa =

Greek mythological figure

According to late Greek sources on classical mythology, Astyanassa (Ancient Greek: Ἀστυάνασσα) was Helen of Troy's maid. The 10th-century scholar Photius, citing Ptolemy Chennus, mentions the story that Aphrodite lent her magical embroidered band (kestos himas) to Helen, to ensure that Paris would fall in love with her, and that Astyanassa stole it. The Byzantine dictionary Suda adds the legend that Astyanassa was the first erotic author (in a tradition that included two other women writers, Philaenis and Elephantis): she wrote a book about sexual positions.
