= Duchess Street, London =

Street in City of Westminster, London

Coordinates: 51.5194°N 0.1437°W

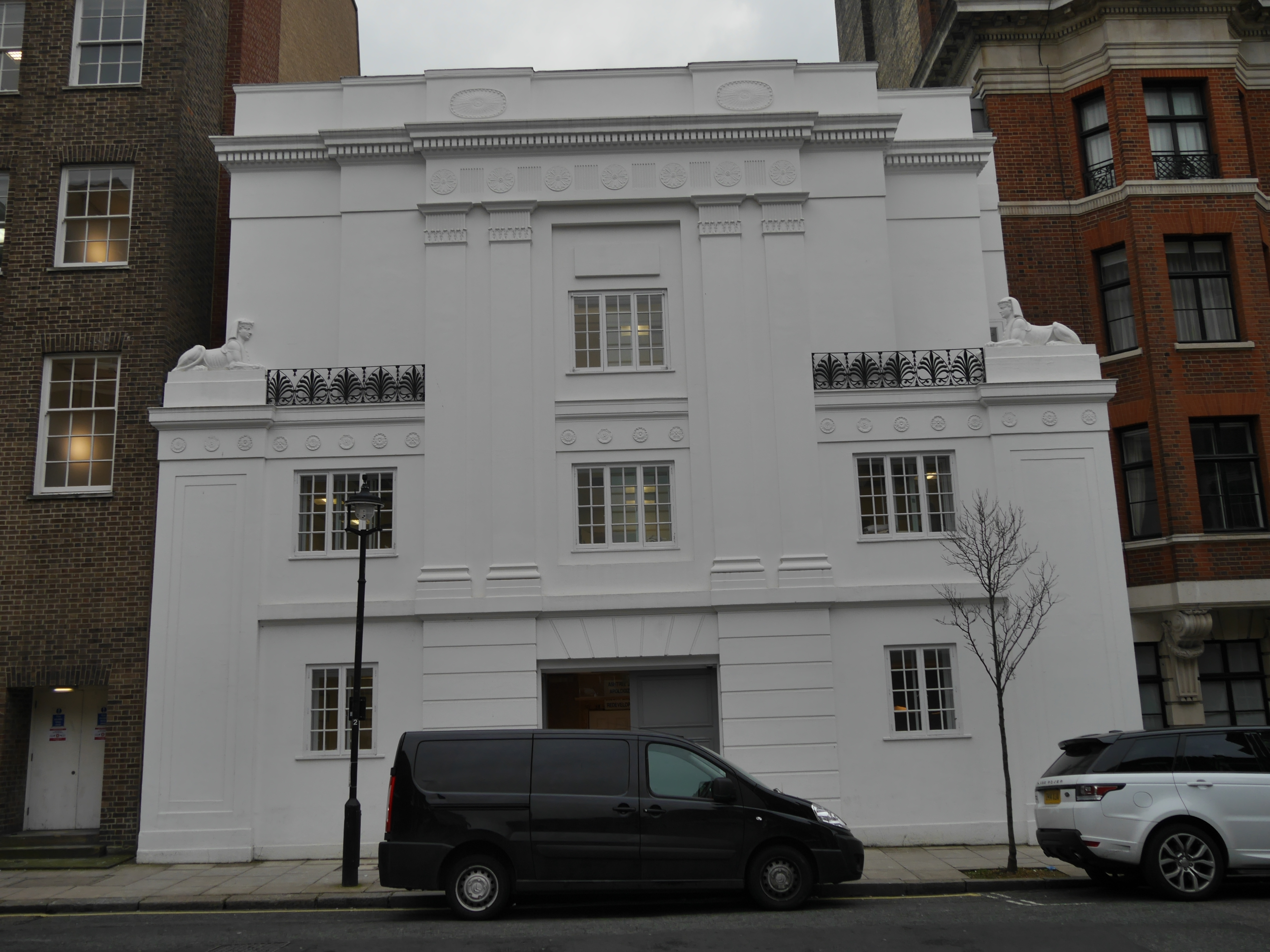
Thomas Hope's house, 10 Duchess Street, London

Duchess Street is a street in the City of Westminster, London, that runs west to east from Mansfield Street in the west to Hallam Street in the east, and crosses Portland Place about halfway. It is named after Margaret Bentinck, Duchess of Portland.

== Thomas Hope's house ==
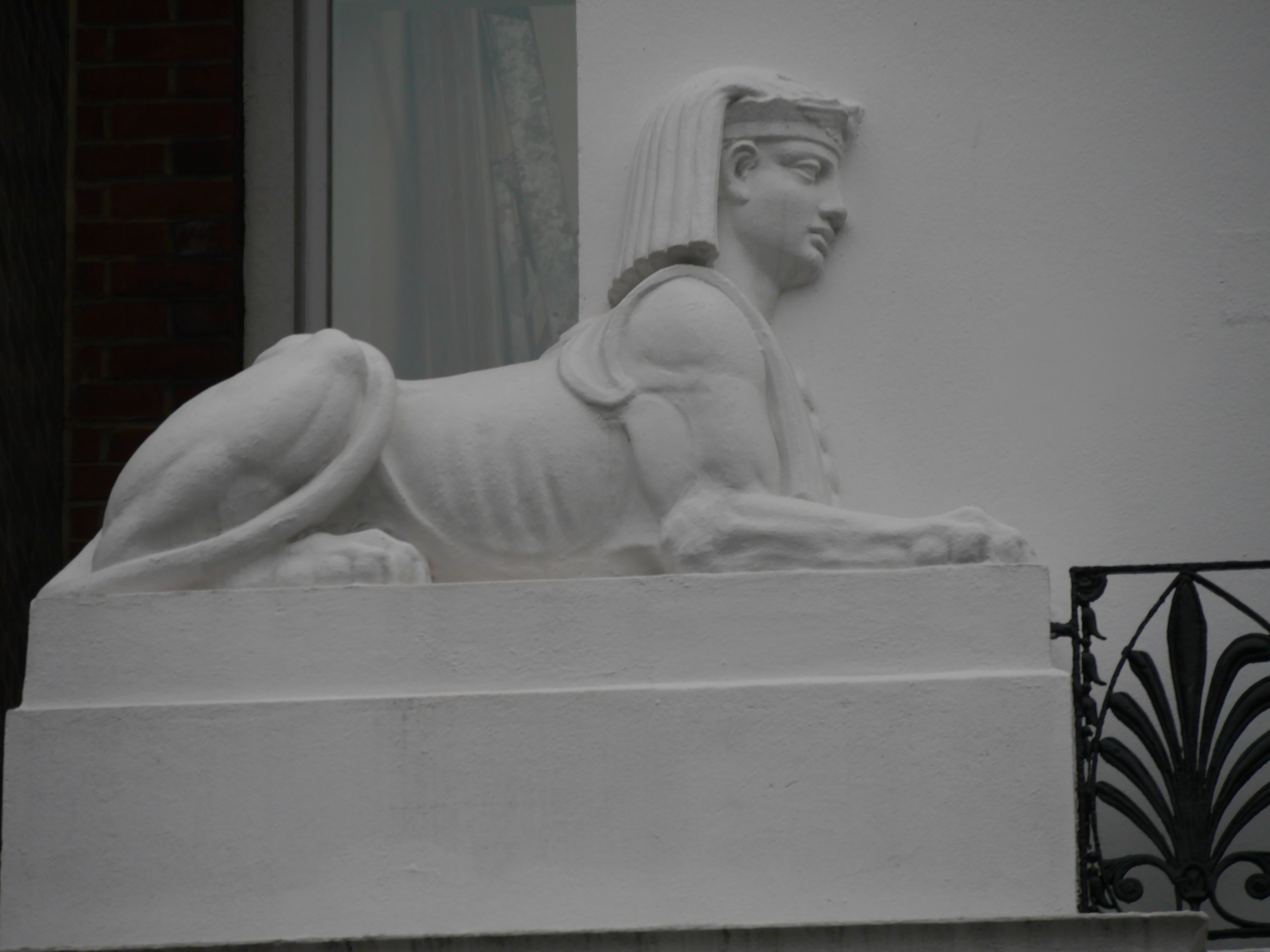
Sphinx, 10 Duchess Street, London

The Anglo-Dutch merchant banker, author, philosopher and art collector Thomas Hope had an Egyptian-influenced house built at no. 10 in 1799, and decorated it extravagantly. The building has been Grade II listed since 1954. The Egyptian Room in his house was the inspiration for the Egyptian Hall in Piccadilly, an exhibition hall built in the ancient Egyptian style in 1812, and demolished in 1905.
