= Codex Fuldensis =

6th-century New Testament manuscript

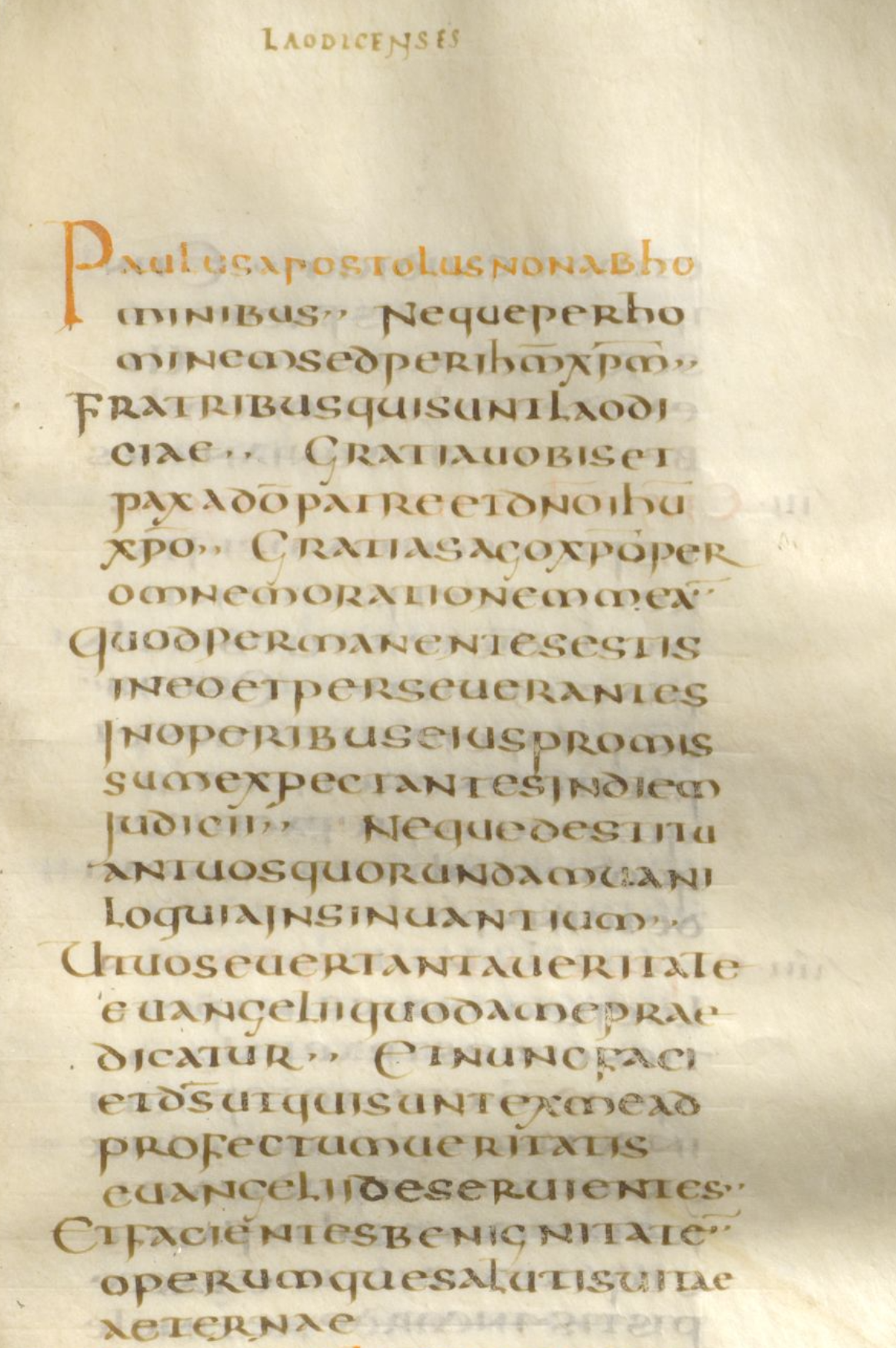
Codex Fuldensis, Epistle to the Laodiceans

The Codex Fuldensis, also known as the Victor Codex (Fulda University and State Library, Codex Bonifatianus I), designated by F, is a New Testament manuscript based on the Latin Vulgate made between 541 and 546. The codex is considered the second most important witness to the Vulgate text; and is also the oldest complete manuscript witness to the order of the Diatessaron. It is an important witness in any discussion about the authenticity of 1 Corinthians 14:34–35 and the Comma Johanneum. It is one of the earliest dated manuscripts of the New Testament. It was corrected until 2 May, 546 AD.

== Description ==
It contains the Diatessaron (in lieu of the Gospels), the 23 remaining canonical books of the New Testament, the Epistle to the Laodiceans, and a copy of Jerome's Prologue to the Canonical Gospels. It represents the Italian text-type.

The four gospels are harmonised into a single continuous narrative, according to the form of Tatian's Diatessaron. Its text is akin to that of Codex Amiatinus. The harmonised gospel text is preceded by a listing of its sections, with a summary of their contents, which was copied unchanged from the Old Latin exemplar. From this it can be determined that the Old Latin source had lacked the Genealogy of Jesus (which Victor inserted); but that the source had included the passage of Jesus and the woman taken in adultery.

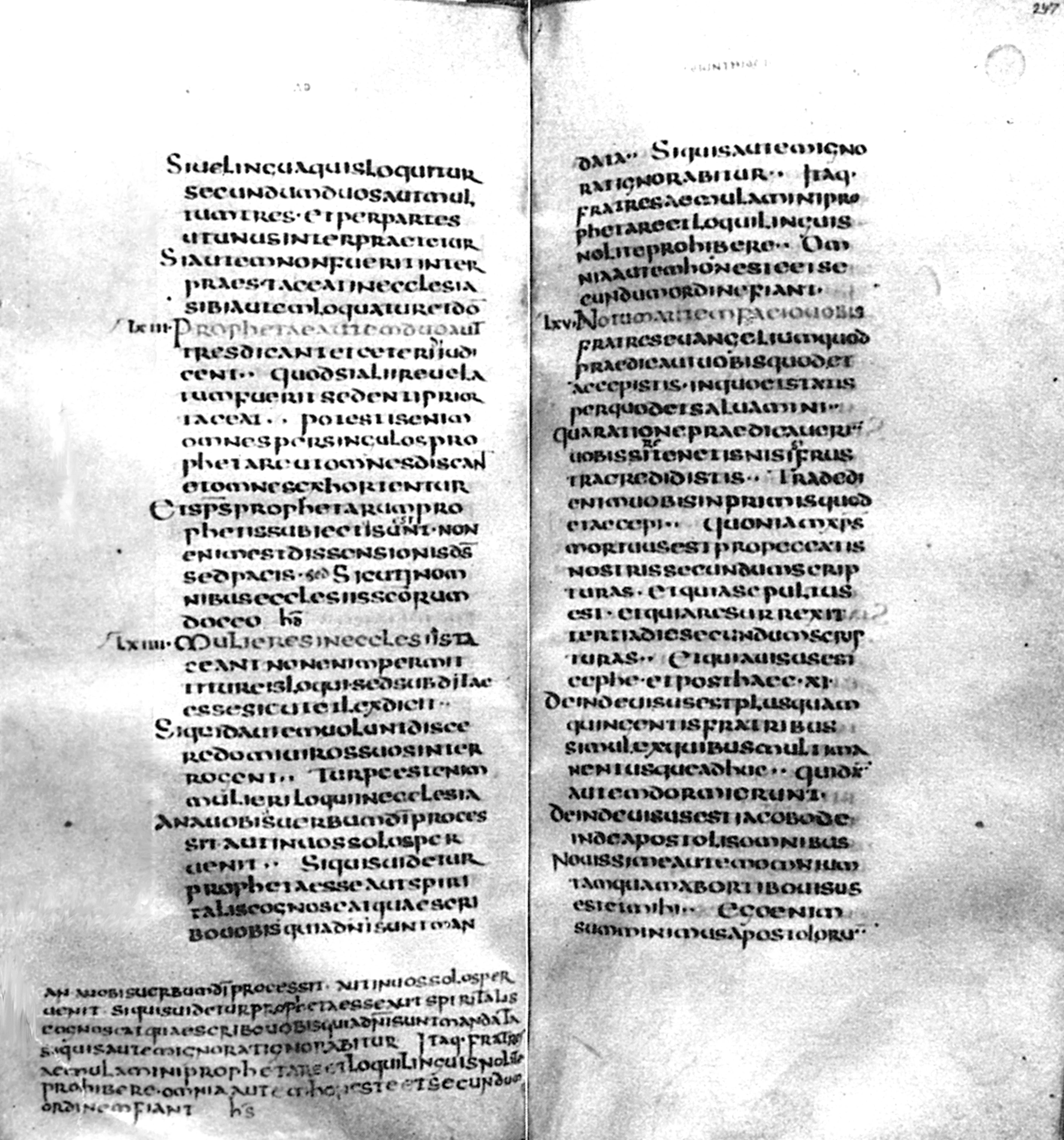
Codex Fuldensis, pages 296–297

The sequence of books follows the ordering:

- Diatessaron
- Pauline epistles
  - Romans
  - 1–2 Corinthians
  - Galatians
  - Ephesians
  - Philippians
  - 1–2 Thessalonians
  - Colossians
  - Laodiceans
  - 1–2 Timothy
  - Titus
  - Philemon
  - Hebrews
- Acts of the Apostles
- Catholic epistles (usual order)
- Book of Apocalypse

The section 1 Cor 14:34–35 is placed by the original scribe in the margin in an unusual order, verses 36–40 before 34–35, while the text on the page is the normal order. This section is marked by umlaut in Codex Vaticanus. Several manuscripts of the Western text-type, placed section 1 Cor 14:34–35 after 1 Cor 14:40 (manuscripts: Claromontanus, Augiensis, Boernerianus, it^{d, g}). Also codex 88, which is not representative of the Western text, placed this section after 1 Cor 14:40. One manuscript of the Vulgate does the same (Codex Reginensis). According to Metzger the evidence of the codex is ambiguous. Perhaps the scribe, without actually deleting verses 34–35 from the text, intended the liturgist to omit them when reading the lesson.

The 1 John text section omits the Comma Johanneum. However, the Vulgate Prologue to the Canonical Epistles includes a direct reference to the heavenly witnesses, with the Prologue written as a first-person epistle from Jerome to Eustochium. In this Prologue unfaithful translators are criticised for removal of the verse. The Prologue from about 1700 on had often been attacked as a late forgery, not by Jerome. At the time the earliest known extant Vulgate with the Prologue was about AD 800. The Prologue was noted to be in the Codex Fuldensis of AD 546 when the text was published by Ranke c. AD 1850.

== History ==
Victor of Capua (died 554) reports that he found an Old Latin harmony of the Gospels, which he recognised as following Tatian's arrangement of the Diatessaron. He substituted the Vulgate text for the Old Latin, appending the rest of the New Testament books from the standard Vulgate. Boniface acquired the codex and in 745 gave it to the monastic library (Abb. 61), in Fulda in Germany, where it remains to the present day (hence the name of the codex). It served as the source text for vernacular harmonies in Old High German and Old Saxon. According to Malcolm Parkes, glosses to James are in Boniface's own handwriting.

Codex Sangallensis 56 was copied, in the 9th century, from the Diatessaron of the Codex Fuldensis. It also contains some extracts from the Acts of the Apostles.

Ernst Ranke published the text of the codex in 1868.

== See also ==
- List of New Testament Latin manuscripts
- Biblical manuscripts
- Textual criticism
