= Theoi Project =

Digital library of Greek Mythology

The Theoi Project (also known as Theoi Greek Mythology) is a digital library website about Greek mythology and its representation in classical literature and ancient Greek art. It serves as a free reference to the gods (theoi), spirits (daimones), mythological creatures (theres) and heroes of ancient Greek mythology and religion. Established in 2000, the website contains more than 1,500 pages and 1,200 images. The website also has a library of classical literature on the theme of Greek mythology, including the works of many of the lesser-known poets.

The website was created by Aaron J. Atsma, of Auckland, New Zealand.
