= On Grace and Dignity =

"On Grace and Dignity" (German: Über Anmut und Würde) is an influential philosophical essay published by Friedrich Schiller in the journal Neue Thalia in mid June 1793. It is his first major support for the philosophy of Immanuel Kant, critically assessing the treatments of ethics and aesthetics in Kant's Critique of Judgment.

In it, in view of human beings' dual nature as rational and emotional beings, Schiller explained human beauty in terms of Grace (Anmut) and Dignity (Würde). His emphatic answer to this was a Kantian dualism reconciling the physical and cognitive nature in people in a synthesis seen in 'beautiful souls' (Schöne Seelen) in which duty and nature harmonised. It thus paved the way for Schiller's philosophical and aesthetic masterwork On the Aesthetic Education of Man.
