= Juno Borrowing the Belt of Venus =

Painting by Élisabeth Vigée Le Brun

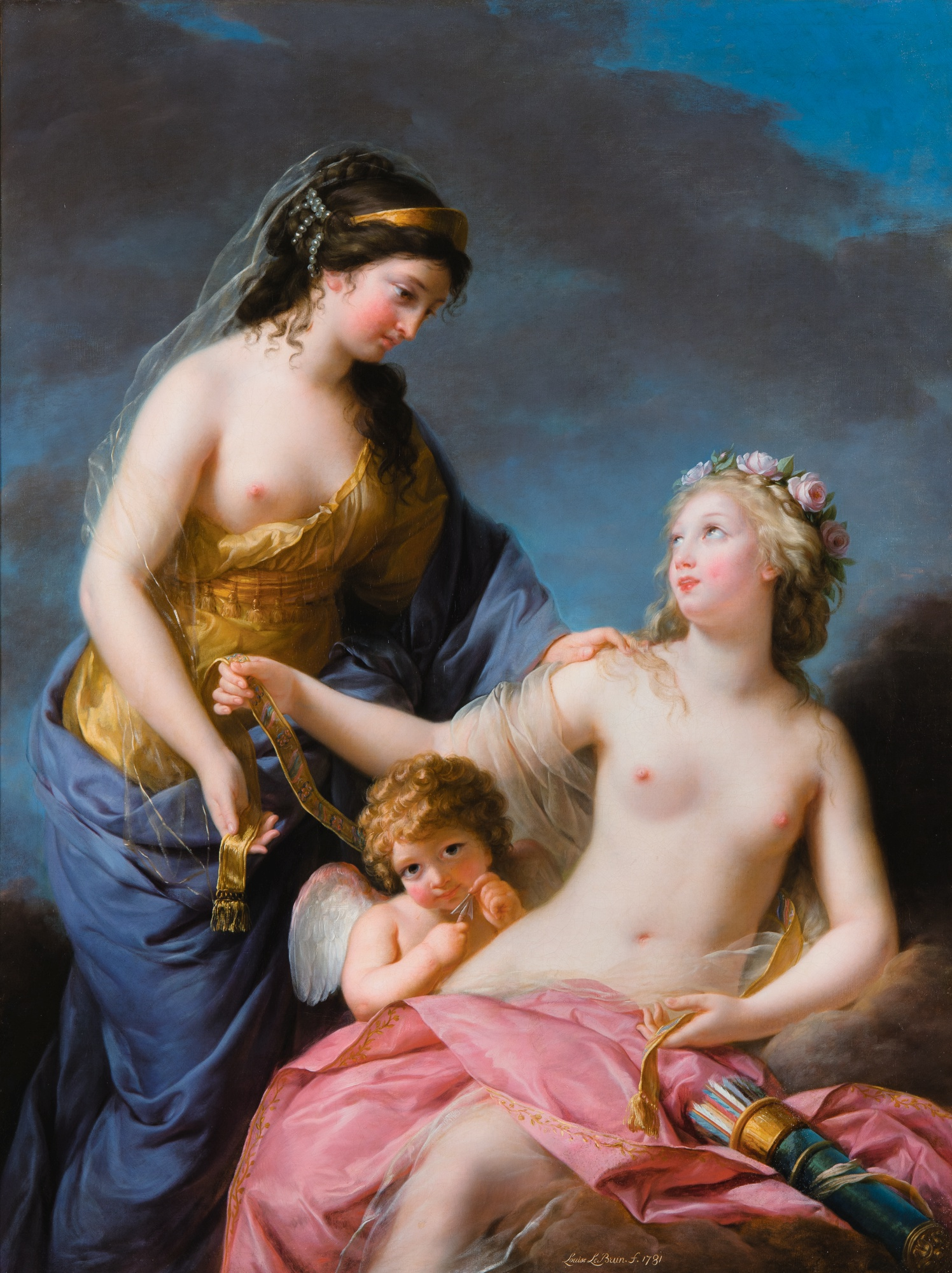
- Artist: Élisabeth Vigée Le Brun
- Year: 1781
- Type: Oil on canvas, history painting
- Dimensions: 147.3 cm × 113.5 cm (58.0 in × 44.7 in)
- Location: Private collection

Juno Borrowing the Belt of Venus is a 1781 history painting by the French artist Élisabeth Vigée Le Brun. It depicts a scene from Greek and Roman Mythology. Taken from a passage in Homer's Iliad it shows the Goddess Juno borrowing the Girdle of Aphrodite from Venus in her efforts to seduce Jupiter.

It was exhibited at the Salon of 1783 at the Louvre in Paris. The painting was commissioned by the Count of Artois, the future Charles X of France, for the large sum of 15,000 livres and was in his collection until being confiscated after the French Revolution.

== Bibliography ==
- Bailey, Colin C. Patriotic Taste: Collecting Modern Art in Pre-revolutionary Paris. Yale University Press, 2002.
- Sheriff, Mary D. The Exceptional Woman: Elisabeth Vigee-Lebrun and the Cultural Politics of Art. University of Chicago Press, 1997.
- Walker, Leslie H. A Mother's Love: Crafting Feminine Virtue in Enlightenment France. Associated University Presse, 2008.
