= Wolfgang Speyer =

German classical philologist & historian of religion

Wolfgang Speyer (born June 1, 1933) is a German classical philologist and historian of religion. He is a professor at the University of Salzburg.

== Biography ==
Speyer was born in 1933 in Cologne, Germany. He graduated from a Catholic boarding school in Ettal and the Dreikönigsgymnasium, a gymnasium preparatory school in Cologne. Speyer attended the University of Cologne from 1954–1958 and studied classical philology, ancient history, and philosophy. In 1958, he received his doctorate under Hellfried Dahlmann. From 1959 to 1962 he was a research assistant at the Institut für Altertumskunde (Institute for Classical Studies) at the University of Cologne, and in 1963 and 1965–76 he worked at the Franz Joseph Dölger Institute for the study of late antiquity at the University of Bonn and studied Catholic theology. Speyer completed his habilitation in Classical Philology at the University of Salzburg in 1976. In 1977 he received an associate professorship and in 1987 a full professorship. From 1972 to 2013, Speyer was co-editor of the Reallexikon für Antike und Christentum, and published many articles himself in that journal. He is a member of the Bayerische Benediktinerakademie and PEN International.

The main area of Speyer's work is the interplay between Greek and Roman traditions of antiquity, Judaism, and early Christianity.

== Notable works ==
Speyer's 1971 work Die literarische Fälschung im heidnischen und christlichen Altertum — Ein Versuch ihrer Deutung on apocrypha, pseudepigrapha, and literary forgery in antiquity has been praised as one of the few comprehensive sources on the subject by scholar of antiquity Bart Ehrman.
