= Guy Head =

English painter (died 1800)

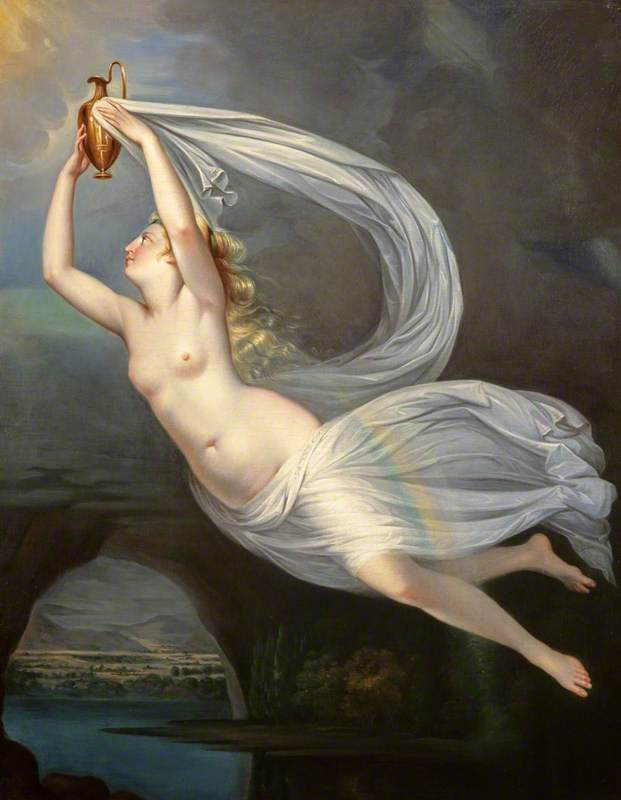
Iris (c. 1800)

Guy Head (died 1800) was an English painter.

== Life ==
Guy Head was the son of a house-painter at Carlisle. He learnt drawing under Captain John Bernard Gilpin, and eventually entered as a student at the Royal Academy. His work was noticed by Sir Joshua Reynolds. In 1779 he exhibited a portrait of a gentleman at the Royal Academy, and another in 1780. In the latter year he also sent to the exhibition of the Society of Artists at Spring Gardens a painting of The Fire at London Bridge Waterworks and two portraits. In 1781 he sent to the Royal Academy a landscape with the story of Europa, and a portrait of Henderson the actor as Richard III.

With the help of a friend and introductions from Reynolds, Head went to Italy, and resided for some years at Rome. He was a skilful copyist, and his copies of the works of Correggio, Titian, and others were much commended. Some large copies of Rubens's pictures at Antwerp are in the Royal Academy. He also painted, besides portraits, classical subjects of a decorative nature.

At the Revolutionary outbreak in 1798 he returned to England, with a large collection of drawings, copies, and other pieces, which he intended to exhibit, but died suddenly in London on 16 December 1800. His works were sold by auction in 1805, but his reputation did not survive his death. Two pictures of Echo and Iris were engraved after him by J. Folo in 1814, and a horse's head by C. Turner.

== Bibliography ==
- Belsey, Hugh (2003). "Head, Guy". In Grove Art Online. Oxford University Press. doi:10.1093/gao/9781884446054.article.T037090
- Cust, Lionel Henry (1891). "Head, Guy" . In Stephen, Leslie; Lee, Sidney (eds.). Dictionary of National Biography. Vol. 25. London: Smith, Elder & Co. p. 326.
- Ingamells, John (2004). "Head, Guy (bap. 1760, d. 1800), painter". In Oxford Dictionary of National Biography. Oxford University Press.
- Oliver, Valerie Cassel, ed. (2011). "Head, Guy". In Benezit Dictionary of Artists. Oxford University Press.
- Pressly, N. L. (1982). "Guy Head and his 'Echo Flying from Narcissus': A British Artist in Rome in the 1790s". Bulletin of the Detroit Institute of Arts, 60: pp. 68–79.
