= Catharina =

Catharina is a feminine given name, the Dutch and Swedish spelling of the name Catherine. In the Netherlands, people use a great number of short forms in daily life, including Carine, Catelijne, Cato, Ina, Ineke, Kaat, Kaatje, Karen, Karin, Katja, Katrien, Katrijn, Kitty, Nienke, Rina, Tineke, Tiny, Toos, Trijn, Trijntje, and many others. People with the name include:

== Academics, science ==
- Catharina C.J.H. "Catrien" Bijleveld (born 1958), Dutch criminologist
- Catharina Halkes (1920–2011), Dutch theologian and feminist
- Catharina Jantina "Catherine" de Jong (born 1956), Dutch anesthesiologist, drug rehab physician and intensivist
- Catharina Geertruida "Catrien" Santing (born 1958), Dutch medievalist
- Catharina Stroppel (born 1971), German mathematician
- A.P. Catharina "Catharine" van Tussenbroek (1852–1925), Dutch physician and feminist

== Arts ==
- Catharina Ahlgren (1734–c. 1800), Swedish feminist writer, poet, translator, editor and journalist
- Catharina Backer (1689–1766), Dutch art collector and painter
- Catharina S.F. "Kate" Bisschop-Swift (1834–1928), English-born Dutch painter
- Catharina Both-van der Eem (1589–1666), Haarlem citizen painted by Frans Hals
- Catharina Burea (1601–1678), Swedish translator.
- Catharina Chen (born 1985), Norwegian classical violinist
- Catharina A.P.A. "Kitty" Courbois (1937–2017), Dutch actress
- Catharina Irma Dessaur (1931–2002), Dutch writer with the pseudonym Andreas Burnier
- Catharina Jacoba Abrahamina Enschedé (1828–1883), Dutch painter
- Catharina Regina von Greiffenberg (1633–1694), Austrian poet
- Catharina "Nina" Hagen (born 1955), German singer, songwriter, and actress
- Catharina van Hemessen (1528–aft.1567), Flemish portrait painter
- Catharina Hooft (1618–1691), Dutch patrician painted by Frans Hals
- Catharina Hooghsae (1607–1685), Dutch patrician painted by Rembrandt
- Catharina van Knibbergen (1630–1675), Dutch landscape painter
- Catharina Lescaille (1649–1711), Dutch poet, translator and publisher
- Catharina Oostfries (1636–1708), Dutch glass painter
- Catharina Peeters (1615–1676), Flemish seascape painter
- Catharina Pepijn (1619–1688), Flemish portrait painter
- Catharina Pratten (1821–1895), German guitar virtuoso, composer and teacher
- Catharina Questiers (1631–1669), Dutch poet and dramatist
- Catharina van Rennes (1858–1940), Dutch music educator, soprano and composer
- Catharina Julia Roeters van Lennep (1813–1883), Dutch still life painter
- Catharina Rozee (1632–1682), Dutch embroidery artist
- Catharina Smith (fl. 1807–1815), English novelist and actress
- Catharina Charlotta Swedenmarck (1744–1813), Swedish-Finnish writer and poet
- Catharina Torenberg (1787–1866), Finnish violinist
- Catharina Jacoba van Velde (1903–1985), Dutch novelist
- Catharina Ykens (1659–?), Flemish still life painter

== Politics ==
- Catharina Bråkenhielm (born 1956), Swedish social democratic politician
- Catharina Isabella "Ien" Dales (1931–1994), Dutch politician, Minister of the Interior
- Catharina Elmsäter-Svärd (born 1965), Swedish politician, Minister for Infrastructure
- Catharina E.G. "Karien" van Gennip (born 1968), Dutch CDA politician
- j. Catharina "Tineke" Huizinga (born 1960), Dutch politician, Minister of Environment
- Catharina J.E. "Nine" Kooiman (born 1980), Dutch politician and social worker.
- Catharina Nies (born 1985), German politician
- Catharina Stopia (fl. 1620–1657), Swedish ambassador to Russia
- Catharina "Cathy" Ubels-Veen (1928–2015), Dutch Evangelical politician

== Royalty, nobility, court ==
- Catharina-Amalia, Princess of Orange (born 2003), Crown princess of the Netherlands
- Catharina Belgica of Nassau (1578–1648), Flemish-born consort and regent of Hanau-Münzenberg
- Catharina van Gelre (c. 1440 – 1497), regent of the Duchy of Guelders
- Catharina Anna Grandon de Hochepied (1767–1803), Hungarian-Swedish noble
- Catharina Ulrika Hjort af Ornäs (1767–1837), Swedish noblewoman and murder victim
- Catharina van Holland (c. 1280 – 1328), daughter of Floris V, Count of Holland
- Catharina Ebba Horn (1720–1781), Swedish noble and mistress of king Frederick I of Swede
- Catharina van Kleef (1417–1479), Duchess of Guelders
- Catharina Månsdotter (1550–1612), Queen of Sweden
- Catharina van Nassau (1543–1624), sister of William I the Silent
- Catharina Rickert (1674–1734), official royal mistress of Frederick I of Prussia
- H. Catharina L. "Trina" Schneider (1856–1918), Baltic-German tutor at the court of Tsar Nicholas II
- Catharina Wallenstedt (1627–1719), Swedish maid of honour to Queen Christina and letter writer
- Catharina of Württemberg (1783–1835), Russian-born queen consort of Westphalia

== Sports ==
- Catharina Johanna "Toos" Beumer (born 1947), Dutch swimmer
- Catharina Clasina "Rini" Dobber (born 1943), Dutch swimmer
- Catharina Petronella "Catrien" Eijken (born 1961), Dutch synchronized swimmer
- Catharina "Toos" van den Ende (born 1945), Dutch rower
- Catharina Felser (born 1982), German race car driver
- Catharina Glassér-Bjerner (born 1964), Swedish alpine skier
- Catharina C.M. "Kitty" van Haperen (born 1976), Dutch athlete and bobsledder
- Catharina Maria "Toos" van der Klaauw (1915–2011), Dutch fencer
- Catharina B.J. "Tineke" Lagerberg (born 1941), Dutch swimmer
- Catharina Lindgren (born 1963), Swedish figure skater
- Catharina Neelissen (born 1961), Dutch rower
- Catharina Wilhelmina "Tini" Wagner (1919–2004), Dutch swimmer

== Other ==
- Catharina Besselman (1678–1702), Dutch colonist in the Dutch East Indies
- Catharina Bröms (1665–1735), Swedish iron master
- Catharina de Chasseur (1490–1541), Dutch counterfeiter
- Catharina Cramer (1656–1746), Dutch midwife
- Catharina "Carin" du Rietz (1766–1788), Swedish Royal Guard soldier
- Catharina Cornelia Hodshon (1768–1829), Dutch heiress and regent of almshouses
- Catharina Egges (1750–1824), Dutch publisher
- Catharina Freymann (1708–1791), Norwegian pietist leader
- Catharina de Grebber (born 1498), Dutch kidnapping victim
- Catharina Elisabet Grubb (1721–1788), Swedish-Finnish industrialist
- Catharina Haynes (born 1963), United States Circuit Judge
- Catharina Herman (fl. 1604), Dutch heroine of the Eighty Years' War
- Catharina Heybeek (1764–1810), Dutch journalist, feminist and editor
- Catharina Justander (1723–1778), Swedish-Finnish missionary
- Catharina Johanna Koek (1763–1843), Dutch governor's wife
- Catharina "Trijn" van Leemput (c. 1530 – 1607), Dutch heroine of the Eighty Years' War
- Catharina Margaretha Linck (died 1721), Prussian woman executed for sodomy
- Catharina "Rina" Lodders (born 1942), Dutch model, Miss World 1962
- Catharina Lysholm (1744–1815), Norwegian ship-owner
- Catharina Mulder a.k.a. Kaat Mossel (1723–1798), Dutch Orangist activist
- Catharina Choi Nunes (born 1990), Korean-Brazilian model
- Catharina Roodzant (1896–1999), Dutch chess master
- Catharina Rose (fl. 1587), Dutch heroin in the Eighty Years' War
- Catharina de San Joan (1605–1688), India-born anchorite and visionary
- Catharina Serafin (fl. 1892), Prussian medical patient
- Catharina Svensson (born 1982), Danish model, Miss Earth 2001
- Catharina Wahllund (1771–1843), Swedish-Finnish restaurateur

== See also ==
- Catharina (crater), a lunar impact crater, in 1935 named after Catherine of Alexandria
- Catharina (ship), a German barque built in 1810
- Catarina (disambiguation)
- Catherina (and similar spellings)
- Katharina
