= Gesine =

Gesine (German: [ɡeˈziːnə]) is a German feminine given name and may refer to:

- Gesine Becker (1888–1968), left wing German activist and politician
- Gesine Bullock-Prado (born 1970), American pastry chef, TV personality, author, attorney, and former film executive
- Gesine Cukrowski (born 1968), German actress
- Gesine Lötzsch (born 1961), German politician of the left-wing party Die Linke
- Gesine Manuwald, Professor of Latin and Head of the Department of Greek and Latin at University College London
- Gesine Meißner (born 1952), German politician, Member of the European Parliament (MEP) from 2009 to 2019
- Pauline Johanna Gesine Mouthaan (1892–1969), Dutch artist
- Gesine Reinert, University Professor in Statistics at the University of Oxford
- Gesine Ruge, German sprint canoeist who has competed since the mid-2000s
- Gesine Schröder (born 1957), German musicologist and music theorist
- Gesine Schwan (born 1943), German political science professor, member of the Social Democratic Party of Germany
- Gesine Spieß (1945–2016), German educationalist at the University of Applied Sciences in Erfurt
- Gesine Walther (born 1962), retired German sprinter

== See also ==
- Anniversaries. From the Life of Gesine Cresspahl, a tetralogy of novels by Uwe Johnson
- The Treasure of Gesine Jacobsen (German: Der Schatz der Gesine Jakobsen), a 1923 German silent drama film
- Gezin
- Gęsin
- Gęzyn
- Jessine
