= Ineke =

Dutch feminine given name

Ineke is a Dutch feminine given name. It originated as a diminutive of Ina, which can be a short form of a number names, like Catharina, Gesina, Hendrina, Klazina, etc. It is also a rare possibly matronymic surname in the Netherlands. Ineke may refer to

First name

- Ineke Bakker (born 1956), Dutch sprint canoeist
- Ineke Dezentjé Hamming-Bluemink (born 1954), Dutch politician
- Ineke Donkervoort (born 1953), Dutch rower
- Ineke van Gent (born 1957), Dutch politician
- Ineke Hans (born 1966), Dutch industrial designer
- Ineke Lambers-Hacquebard (1946–2014), Dutch politician
- Ineke Mulder (born 1950), Dutch politician
- Ineke Ran (born 1962), Dutch swimmer
- Ineke Sluiter (born 1959), Dutch classicist
- Ineke Tigelaar (born 1945), Dutch swimmer
- Ineke Van Schoor (born 1995), Belgian acrobatic gymnast
- Ineke van Wetering (1934–2011), Dutch anthropologist and Surinamist

Surname

- Eric Ineke (born 1947), Dutch jazz drummer
