= Tineke =

Dutch feminine given name

Tineke is a Dutch feminine given name, which may refer to:

- Tineke Bartels (born 1951), Dutch equestrienne
- Tineke Buchter, better known as Tina Strobos (1920–2012), Dutch psychiatrist who rescued Jews during the Holocaust
- Tineke Fopma (born 1953), Dutch retired cyclist
- Tineke Hidding (born 1959), Dutch retired heptathlete
- Tineke Hofland (born 1954), Dutch retired swimmer
- Tineke Huizinga (born 1960), Dutch former politician, Secretary of State, and Minister of Environment and Spatial Planning
- Tineke Lagerberg (born 1941), Dutch retired freestyle swimmer
- Tineke Netelenbos (born 1944), Dutch retired politician and businesswoman
- Tineke de Nooij (born 1941), Dutch radio and television presenter
- Tineke Postma (born 1978), Dutch jazz saxophonist and composer
- Tineke Strik (born 1961), Dutch politician
- Tineke Verburg (1956–2020), Dutch television presenter and journalist
- Tineke Younger, chef and cookbook author
