= Van der Hart =

Van der Hart is a surname. Notable people with the surname include:

- Abraham van der Hart (1747/1757–1820), Dutch architect
- Cor van der Hart (1928–2006), Dutch footballer
- Mickey van der Hart (born 1994), Dutch footballer
