= Tryater =

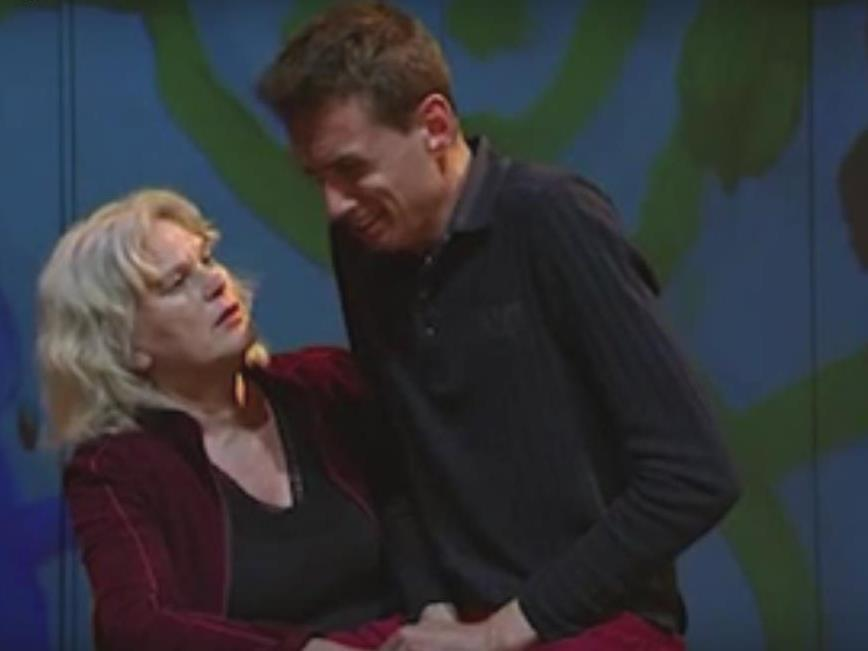
Marijke Geertsma & Theun Plantinga (Rake klappen, 2013)

Tryater is the oldest theatre company in the Netherlands. Since 2020 Tatiana Pratley is the artistic director of Tryater.

2015 marks Tryater's 50th anniversary. This makes Tryater the oldest theatre company in the Netherlands. Tryater plays in theatres, cultural centres, gymnasia, schools and outdoor locations of cities, towns and villages. Tryater also plays outside Friesland. From time to time a selection of the repertoire appears at festivals and in regular theatres in Amsterdam and other places. The Dutch language youth- and children's theatre tours in Drenthe and Groningen. On occasion Tryater also plays abroad.

Nynke Laverman did her internship at Tryater.
