= Pierre Jean Baptiste Charles van der Aa =

Dutch lawyer, patriot, and writer

- Born: 31 October 1770; Haarlem, Dutch Republic
- Died: 12 May 1812 (aged 41); Leiden, Dutch Republic
- Occupations: Lawyer, writer

Pierre Jean Baptiste Charles van der Aa (31 October 1770 – 12 May 1812) was a Dutch lawyer, patriot, and writer.

== Personal life ==
He was born into a family of Lutheran preachers in Haarlem, the son of Christianus Carolus Henricus van der Aa (1718–1793), and married Francisca Adriana Bartha van Peene in 1790, with whom he had five children. Among them were the writers Mr. Christianus Petrus Eliza Robidé van der Aa (1791–1851) and Abraham Jacob van der Aa (1792–1857), known for his Geographical and Biographical Dictionary. After her death, he married Antoinette Catharina "Simon Thomas" in 1799, with whom he had two more children.

== Career ==
Van der Aa became a lawyer in Amsterdam in 1789, where he contributed to the Batavian Revolution of 1795 as a member of the Amsterdam Revolutionary Committee The following year, he became bailiff of Amstelland and served as secretary of Nieuwer-Amstel from 1797 to 1805. He fell out of favor with pensionary Rutger Jan Schimmelpenninck, with whom he had political differences, and was dismissed. He then moved to Leiden to continue his legal practice. Unwilling to accept another post from foreign rulers, he focused on his legal work and writing, which sustained him financially. The names of both of his wives, Simon Thomas and Van Peene, became known as pseudonyms or epithets. He died in Leiden on May 12, 1812.

In addition to his numerous legal works, he wrote: Handboek voor de jongelingschap (Amsterdam 1802), Aanspraak in dichtmaat bij het heugelijk vredefeest (Amsterdam 1802), Redevoering over den minst geachten stand in den Burgerstaat (Amsterdam 1802) and Kleine gedichtjes voor zeer jonge kinderen (Amsterdam 1803).
