= Nies (surname) =

Nies is a surname. Notable people with the surname include:

- Catharina Nies (born 1985), German politician
- Eric Nies (born 1971), American fashion model and television personality
- Frank J. Nies, American architect
- Franz Xaver Nies (1859–1897), German Catholic missionary
- Helen W. Nies (1925–1996), United States federal judge
- Jack Nies (born 1937), American basketball referee
- John Nies (born 1967), American football player and model
- Susanne Nies, German businesswoman
