= Nienke =

Feminine given name

- Pronunciation: Dutch: [ˈniŋkə] West Frisian: [ˈninkə]
- Gender: Feminine
- Languages: Dutch, West Frisian

Origin
- Language: West Frisian
- Derivation: Nine + ke
- Meaning: little Nine

Other names
- Alternative spelling: Nynke
- Derived: Catharina

Nienke (Dutch pronunciation: [ˈniŋkə]), also spelled Nynke, is Dutch and West Frisian feminine given name of West Frisian origin. It is a diminutive of Nine which is probably derived from Catharina. It is the given name of over 14,000 women in the Netherlands and Belgium.

== Etymology ==
Nienke was originally a West Frisian name. It is a diminutive, indicated by the suffix -ke, of the West Frisian name Nine. Nine is probably a flattery form or children's form for the name Catharina, which comes from the Greek word καθαρός (katharós) meaning clean or pure.

== Popularity ==
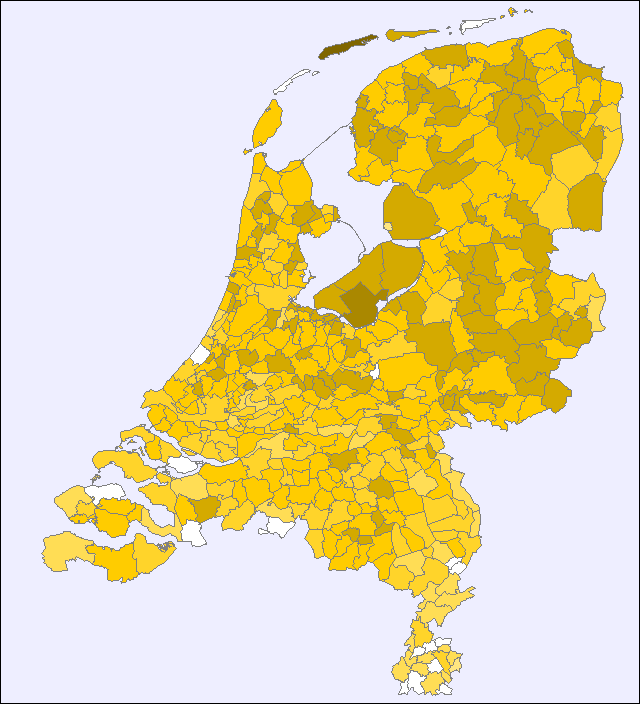
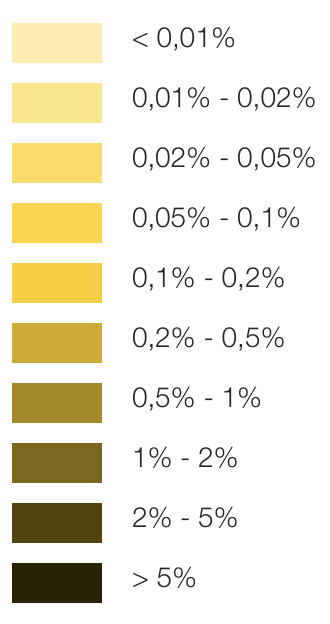
Map of the Netherlands with the relative distribution of the name Nienke per municipality at the start of 2018
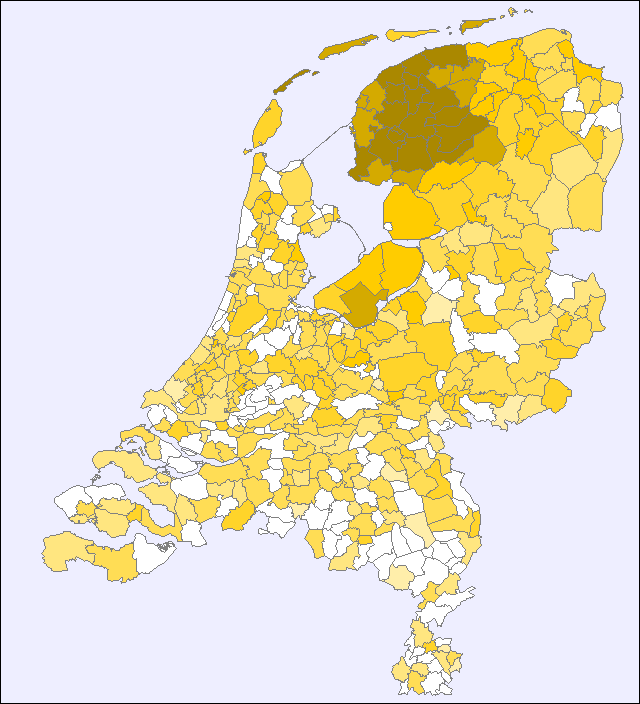
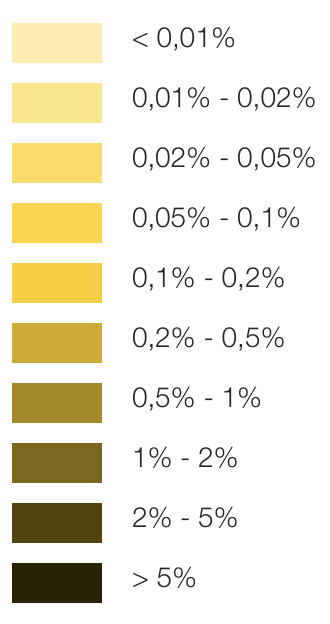
Map of the Netherlands with the relative distribution of the name Nynke per municipality at the start of 2018

As of 2017, Nienke was the first name of 12,515 women (0.1677%) and a middle name of 1,192 women (0.0161%) in the Netherlands.

As of 2022, Nienke was the given name of 781 women in Belgium (0.0132%).

== People with the name ==
=== Nienke ===
People with the given name spelled Nienke include:

- Nienke Brinkman (born 1993), Dutch long-distance runner
- Nienke Hommes (born 1977), Dutch rower
- Nienke Kingma (born 1982), Dutch rower
- Nienke Kremers (born 1985), Dutch field hockey player
- Nienke Timmer (born 1998), Dutch track and field para-athlete
- Nienke Vinke (born 2004), Dutch cyclist

=== Nynke ===
People with the given name spelled Nynke include:

- Nynke Dekker (born 1971), a Dutch biophysicist
- Nynke van Hichtum, pen name of Sjoukje Troelstra-Bokma de Boer (1860–1939), Dutch children's book author
- Nynke Klopstra (born 1973), a Dutch judoka
- Nynke Laverman (born 1980), a Dutch writer and performer
