= NIES =

NIES is an initialism, which may refer to:

Newly industrializing economies:

- Four Asian Tigers
- Newly industrialized country

Various organizations:

- National Institute for Environmental Studies, Japan
- Northern Ireland Electricity Service
- Nanjing Institute of Environmental Sciences, China
- National Industry Extension Service, Australia

Various tools or systems:

- National Imagery Exploitation System, of the National Geospatial-Intelligence Agency, United States Department of Defense

Various academic studies:

- Nauru Island Effect Study, carried out by the[United States Department of Energy from September 2002 to June 2003 to study the island's influence on atmospheric radiation measurement (ARM) at a measurement site located on Nauru.

== See also ==
- Nies (surname)
