= Christianus Robidé van der Aa =

Dutch jurist and author

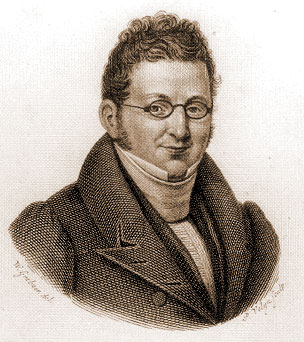
Christianus Petrus Eliza Robidé van der Aa.

Christianus Petrus Eliza Robidé van der Aa (Amsterdam, 7 October 1791 – Oosterbeek, 14 May 1851) was a Dutch jurist and author. He was the son of Pierre Jean Baptiste Charles van der Aa.

== Biography ==
Christianus Petrus Eliza Robidé van der Aa, born in Amsterdam on 7 October 1791, was a son of Pierre Jean Baptiste Charles van der Aa and Francina Adriana Bartha van Peene. After his promotion to Doctor in both Laws on 27 December 1811, he settled in Leiden as a lawyer, in the office of his father. His father died on 12 May 1812, and on 13 June 1812 Christianus was appointed secretary to the mayor of Sneek, because of his fluency in French. On 5 March 1814 he became Secretary and schout of De Lemmer. Thereafter, he became secretary of Lemsterland. In the 1813 revolt against the Napoleonic rule, he was a Major, and during the 1815 war he joined the army as a volunteer.

On 11 June 1816 he married Eelkje Poppes, who was a proficient lyre player and poet, but she abandoned her career to devote herself to her husband and children. In 1818, Van der Aa became a procureur (a lawyer at the court) in Leeuwarden. From then on, he became noted as a poet. While his poetry is not sufficient to rank him among the most important Dutch poets, his work is lovely and enjoyable to read, like his odes to famous persons or his patriotic poetry. For his 1827 poem De dood van Lord Byron (The Death of Lord Byron), he received the Gold Medal of the Koninklijke Maatschappij van Tael- en Dichtkunde (Royal Company for Language and Poetry) in Ghent. His poetry appeared in collections and almanacs like the Almanac voor het Schoone en Goede (Almanac for the Beautiful and the Good), of which he was a longtime editor-in-chief.

His beloved wife died on 20 September 1828, and he remarried in 1830 with Lucia Maria de Jongh, widow of Jan Anthony Kallenberg van den Bosch. She lived at the country house Den Hemelschen Berg (The Heavenly Mountain), where they both moved to in 1834. Van der Aa then quit his position as procureur in Leeuwarden in 1834 and became a lawyer in Arnhem. In September 1838, he became a judge at the arrondissemental court. His poetic production diminished, but his proza production increased. Already in 1827, he was awarded Gold from the Maatschappij tot Nut van 't Algemeen for his exposés on the consequences of domestical negligence, disorder and waste. His focus was on the improvement of the popular education, and in 1840 he was appointed school inspector for the first district of Gelderland. Among his proza of these years should be mentioned four national songs, awarded gold by the Maatschappij tot Nut van 't Algemeen in 1835. The books he made include Losse bladen in het groote Levensboek (1832, 2 parts); De zoon der Natuur en de man naar de Wereld (1837, 2 parts); Oud-Nederland, in de uit vroeger dagen overgebleven burgten en kasteelen (1841, 2 parts); de Rijn in afbeelding en tafereelen geschetst (freely adapted from Tombleson's Views on the Rhine, by J. Watts) (1836, 2 parts); Volksverhalen en Legenden aan de Rijnoevers verzameld (freely adapted from A. Reumonts Rheinlands Sagen, Geschichte und Legenden) (1839, 2 parts).

He reaped the most praise with his writings for the people. In the Volksbode, which he edited and almost singlehandedly wrote from 1839 until 1847, he attacked alcohol abuse and many prejudices and traditional habits. With the same noble purpose, to educate and civilize the people, he wrote many essays as well as booklets for children. In 1825, he became a member of the Maatschappij der Nederlandse Letterkunde in Leiden, in 1826 an associated fellow of the Koninklijk Genootschap van Tael- en Dichtkunde in Antwerp, in 1828 an honorary Member of the Maatschappij van Weldadigheid, in 1830 a member of the Amsterdam division of the Hollandsche Maatschappij van Kunsten en Wetenschappen, in 1836 an honorary member of the Maatschappij Felix Meritis, in 1839 a corresponding member of the Bataviaasch Genootschap der Kunsten en Wetenschappen, and in 1842 a member of the Provinciaal Utrechtsch Genootschap. He was a promoter of the Freemasons, the Maatschappij Tot Nut van 't Algemeen, the Maatschappij tot afschaffing der sterke dranken (Company for the abolishment of liquor), and the Nederlandsche Maatschappij van Nijverheid (the Dutch Company for Industry), which awarded him the 1848 Gold Medal for his experiments with the growth of acacias in the Netherlands.

His second wife died on 28 August 1846. In 1848, Christianus van der Aa was hit by a severe brain disease, from which he suffered until his death on 14 May 1851 from facial cancer.

His motto was the same as that of his family crest: "Doe wel en zie niet om" ("Do good and don't look back").

== Works ==
- Losse Bladen uit het groote Levensboek (2 delen, Amsterdam 1832)
- avec Ottho Gerhard Heldring: De zoon der natuur en de zoon der wereld (2 delen, Amsterdam 1837)
- De Rijn in afbeeldingen (2 delen, Amsterdam 1836)
- Volksverhalen en Legenden aan de Rijnoevers (2 delen, Arnhem 1839)
- Oud-Nederland in zijne burgten en kasteelen opgehelderd (2 delen, Nijmegen 1841)
- avec P. Best: Een zakbibliotheek voor jongelieden (Amsterdam 1835)
- Nederlandsche kleederdragten: een geschenk voor knapen en meisjes (Amsterdam 1839)
