= Gesina =

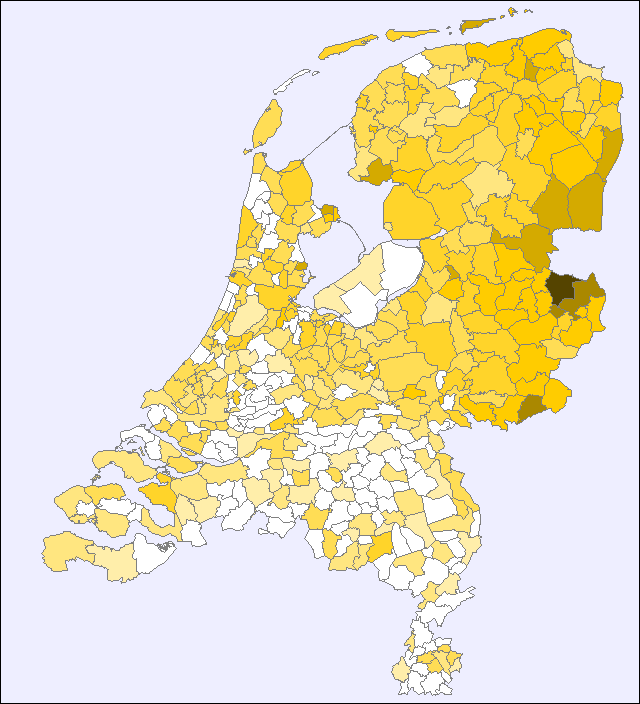
Relative distribution of the name "Gesina" across the Netherlands

Gesina is a Dutch feminine given name. Like the German form Gesine it originated, perhaps via the hypocorism "Ge" and diminutive "Gesie", from Geertruida/Gertrude. People with the name include:

- Johanna Gesina Bonger (1862–1925), wife of Theo van Gogh, key player in the growth of Vincent van Gogh's fame
- Gesina ter Borch (1633–1690), Dutch watercolorist and draftswoman, sister of Gerard ter Borch
- Gesina Maria "Ina" van Faassen (1928–2011), Dutch actress and comedian
- Gesina "Ina" ter Laak-Spijk (1931–2002), Dutch short and middle distance runner
- Henriëtte Gesina Numans (1877–1955), Dutch painter

== See also ==
- Gęsina, a village in central Poland
