= Weidum =

- Village
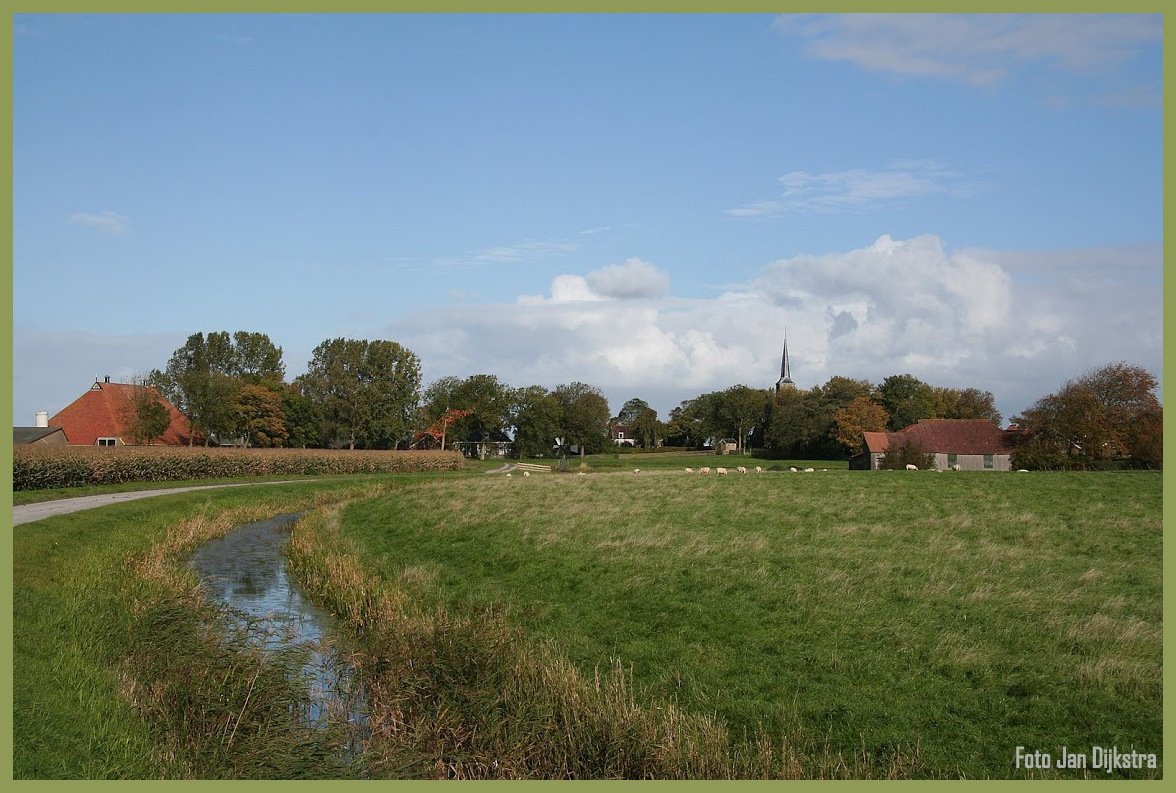
- View on Weidum

- Flag Coat of arms

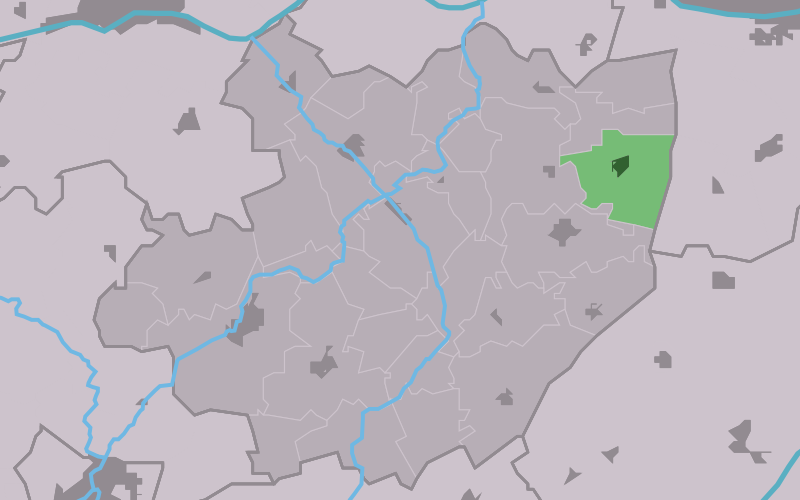
- Location in the former Littenseradiel municipality

- Location in the Netherlands Weidum (Netherlands)
- Country: Netherlands
- Province: Friesland
- Municipality: Leeuwarden

Area
  - Total: 5.60 km^{2} (2.16 sq mi)
- Elevation: 0.9 m (3.0 ft)

Population (2021)
  - Total: 550
  - Density: 98/km^{2} (250/sq mi)
- Time zone: UTC+1 (CET)
  - Summer (DST): UTC+2 (CEST)
- Postal code: 9024
- Dialing code: 058

Weidum is a village in Leeuwarden municipality in the province of Friesland, the Netherlands. It had a population of 576 in January 2017.

== History ==
The village was first mentioned in the 13th century as Wedum, and means "settlement on the pasture". Weidum was a terp (artificial living mound) village from the Middle Ages. Around 1900, most of the terp was excavated. The tower of Dutch Reformed church dates from the early-12th century and was later enlarged. The church itself was built in the 13th century.

Dekemastate was a stins near Weidum which was first mentioned in 1199. In 1397, Sytse Dekema, the owner of the stins returned for Italy to discover that his estate had been destroyed by the Vetkopers. Dekema subsequently fought against the Vetkopers, and in 1399 against the Count of Holland. Dekemastate was rebuilt, but put up for sale in 1796 and subsequently demolished. A manor house was built in its place, however it was severely damaged in a storm in 1898, and in 1902 Dekemastate disappeared for good.

In 1840, Weidum was home to 374 people.

Before 2018, the village was part of the Littenseradiel municipality and before 1984 it belonged to Baarderadeel municipality.

== Notable people ==
- Nynke Laverman (born 1980), poet, songwriter
- Hessel Rienks (1932–2014), politician

== Gallery ==
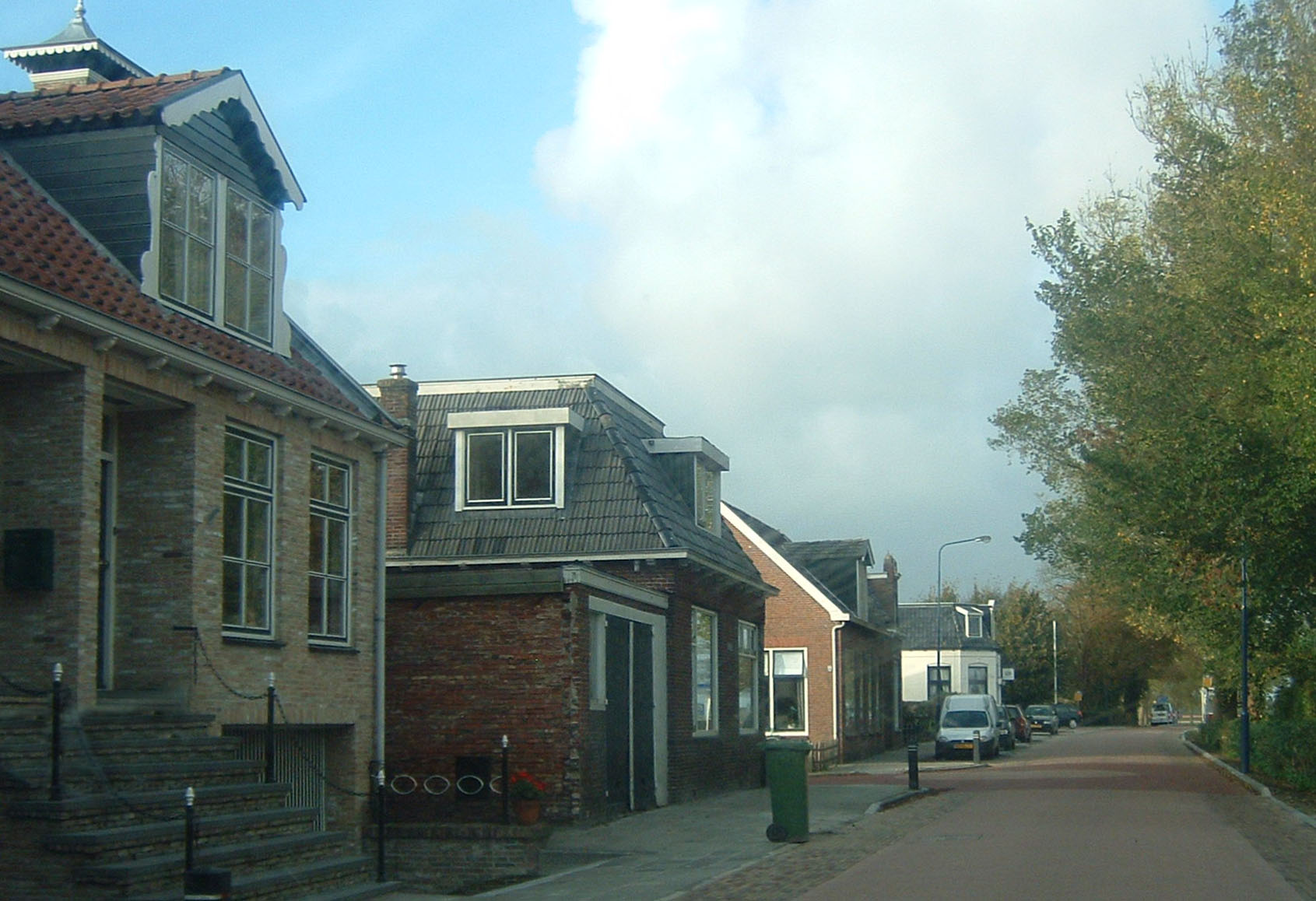
Street view

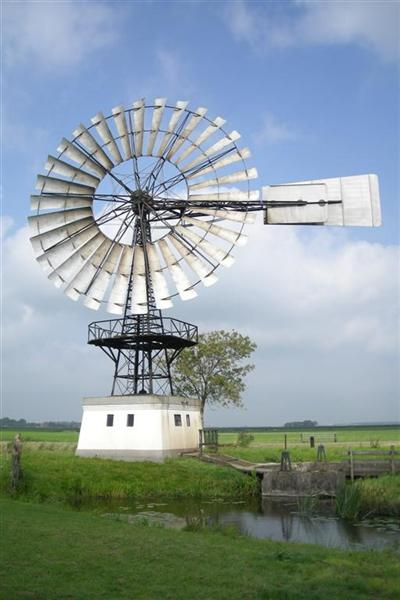
Windmotor

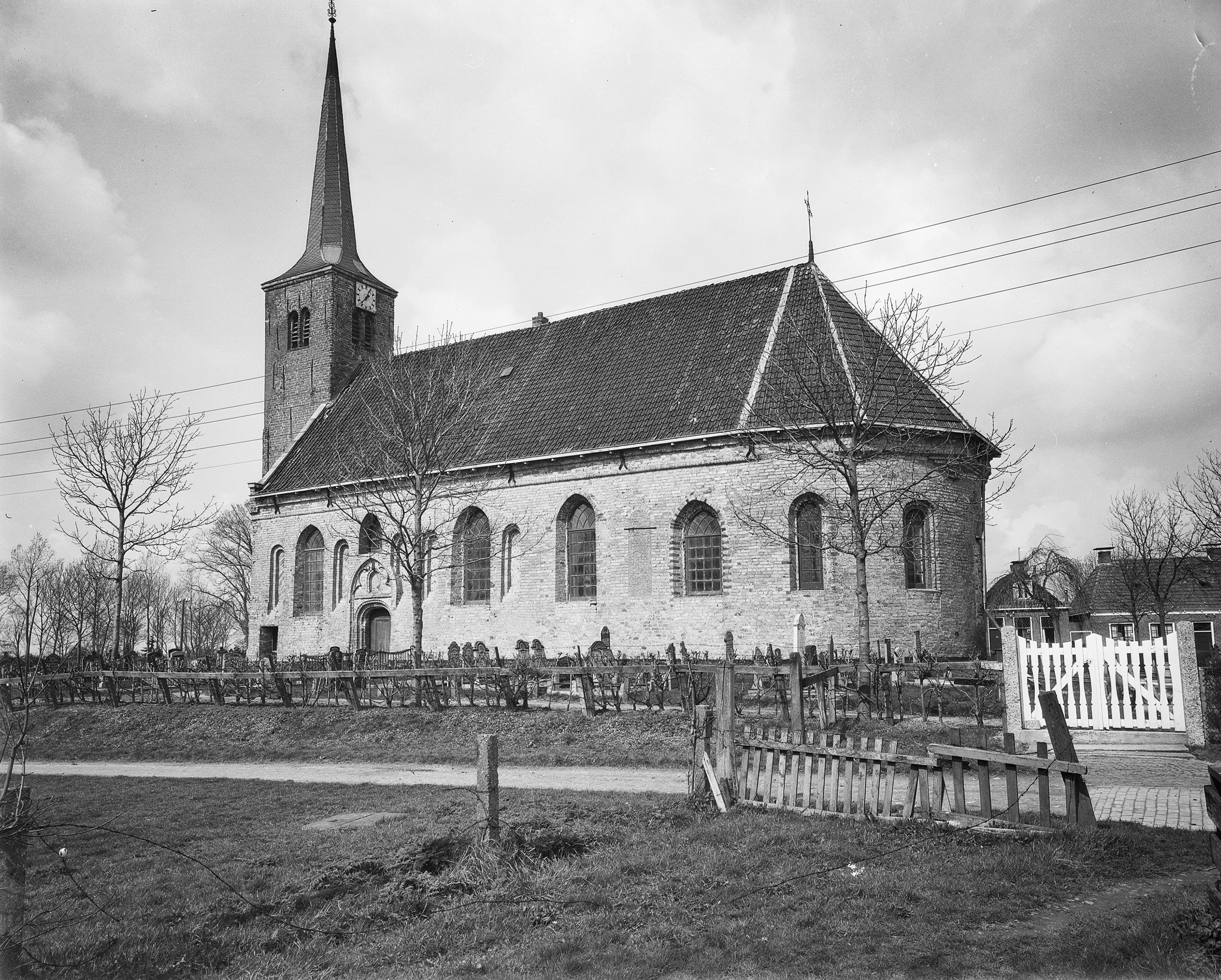
Church of Weidum
