= Tony Fiammetta =

American football player (born 1986)

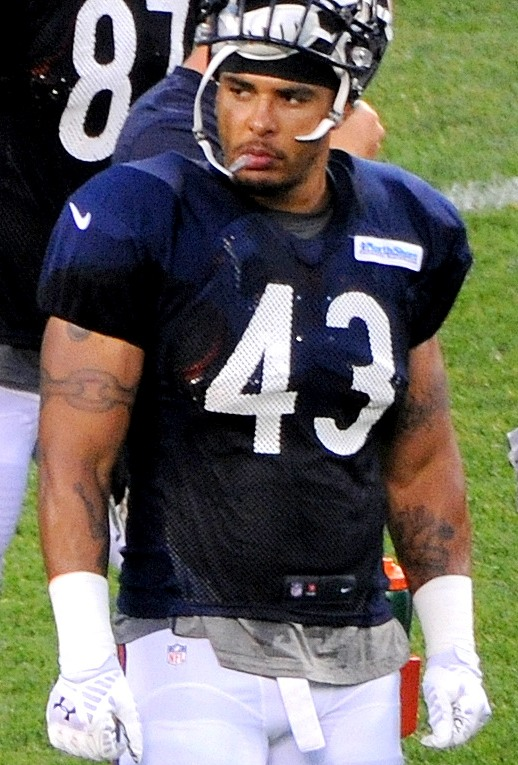
- Fiammetta with the Chicago Bears in 2014

No. 42, 24, 43
- Position: Fullback

Personal information
- Born: August 22, 1986 (age 40); Kaneohe, Hawaii, U.S.
- Listed height: 6 ft 0 in (1.83 m)
- Listed weight: 250 lb (113 kg)

Career information
- High school: Walkersville (Walkersville, Maryland)
- College: Syracuse
- NFL draft: 2009: 4th round, 128th overall pick

Career history
- Carolina Panthers (2009–2010); Dallas Cowboys (2011); New England Patriots (2012); Chicago Bears (2013–2014)

Awards and highlights
- All-American (2008)

Career NFL statistics
- Rushing attempts: 11
- Rushing yards: 26
- Receptions: 12
- Receiving yards: 130
- Stats at Pro Football Reference

Placido Anthony Fiammetta (born August 22, 1986) is an American former professional football player who was a fullback in the National Football League (NFL) for the Carolina Panthers, Dallas Cowboys, New England Patriots and Chicago Bears. He played college football for the Syracuse Orange before being selected by the Panthers in the fourth round of the 2009 NFL draft.

== Early life ==
Tony Fiammetta was born in Kaneohe, Hawaii to parents Vince and Esther Fiammetta. He was raised in Walkersville, Maryland where he attended Walkersville High School. There, he competed in football and lacrosse all four years, and wrestling for one year.

In football, he was a starter at running back. As a senior, he played in just one game before breaking his leg. In that game he recorded 144 yards and three touchdowns on 19 carries. During his high school career, he recorded 499 yards and 12 touchdowns on 60 carries.

SuperPrep named Fiammetta the 25th-ranked prospect in the Mid-Atlantic. PrepStar named him a 2003 All-East Region player.

== College career ==
Fiammetta accepted a football scholarship from Syracuse University. As a redshirt freshman in 2005, he played in ten games, mostly in a special teams role and did not recorded offense stats.

As a sophomore in 2006, he saw action in all 12 games and had eight carries for 15 yards.

As a junior in 2007, he played in 11 games including 8 starts at fullback, blocking for running back Curtis Brinkley. He had three carries for eight yards and 12 receptions for 75 yards.

As a senior in 2008, he played in 10 games, blocking for running back Brinkley, while collecting 66 yards on five carries. He also was third on the team with 16 receptions for 127 yards and one touchdown. In the season finale, he rushed 58 yards on one attempt against the Big East championship team, Cincinnati. Pro Football Weekly named Fiammetta the first-team All-American fullback. He also participated in the 2009 Senior Bowl.

He finished his college career after appearing in 45 games with 18 starts at fullback. He recorded 16 carries for 89 yards, 28 receptions for 202 yards and one touchdown, while earning a reputation as a fierce blocker, making 108 knockdown blocks in his last 2 seasons.

== Professional career ==
=== 2009 NFL draft ===
The NFL Draft Countdown website predicted Fiammetta being selected in one of the middle rounds in the 2009 NFL draft. They described him as an excellent blocker, but with limited ball-carrying experience. NFL Draft Scout rated had him as the number-one fullback out of 87 prospective draft picks. He had the most bench reps at the combine by a back with 30 and posted impressive overall numbers for his position.

Pre-draft measurables
| Height | Weight | 40-yard dash |
|---|---|---|
| 6 ft 0 in (1.83 m) | 245 lb (111 kg) | 4.58 s |
All values from NFL Combine

=== Carolina Panthers ===
Fiammetta was selected in the fourth round (128th overall) of the 2009 NFL draft by the Carolina Panthers. As a rookie, he was a backup at fullback behind Brad Hoover.

In 2010, he appeared in 14 games with 9 starts at fullback. On December 31, he was placed on the injured reserve list, with a left ankle injury that he suffered in the fifteenth game against the Arizona Cardinals.

In 2011, he suffered a concussion in the preseason opener against the New York Giants. On September 3, he was waived after not being able to practice following his injury and the Panthers claiming fullback Jerome Felton.

=== Dallas Cowboys ===
On September 4, 2011, he was claimed off waivers by the Dallas Cowboys. He was waived on September 7, to make room for Laurent Robinson. He was re-signed on September 13 and went on to become a difference-making lead blocker for running back DeMarco Murray.

He was declared inactive after the ninth game with an undisclosed illness, which turned out to be an inner ear problem, that caused nausea, dizziness and that was likely related to a concussion. Without him for the rest of the season, the production of the running game suffered.

=== New England Patriots ===
On March 26, 2012, Fiammetta signed as a free agent with the New England Patriots. On August 5, he was placed on the exempt/left squad list, after leaving training camp to attend a personal issue.

On March 18, 2013, Fiammetta was reactivated from the reserve/left squad list to the active roster. On April 29, he was released by the Patriots.

=== Chicago Bears ===
On June 10, 2013, Fiammetta was signed by the Chicago Bears following tight end Evan Rodriguez's release. He revived his career after appearing in all 16 games (seven starts). On December 28, he was signed to a two-year contract extension.

On August 22, 2014, he suffered a hamstring injury and was eventually released on September 12. Although he was brought back two days later, he was waived injured on September 25, after playing on only one game because of recurring hamstring problems.
