= Catharina Cornelia Hodshon =

Dutch heiress

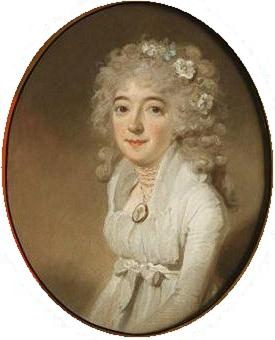
Portrait of Catharina Hodshon by Charles Howard Hodges

Catharina Cornelia Hodshon (24 November 1768 – 16 November 1829) was a wealthy Dutch heiress and regentess of the Wijnbergshofje.

== Biography ==
She was born in Haarlem as the daughter of Albertus Hodshon, a linen dealer, and Catharina Cornelia van der Graas. Both of her parents died before she was twelve, and together with two brothers, she became the ward of Pieter Kops.

At 22, she was a wealthy heiress and regentess of the Wijnbergshofje who hired the leading Amsterdam architect Abraham van der Hart to build the house currently known as Hodshon House on the Spaarne. Her brother married the sister of Adriaan van der Hoop, who later bought the house, though he never lived there. In 1841, the house was sold for 29,500 gulden to the Hollandsche Maatschappij van Wetenschappen. She died in Haarlem.
