= Koninklijke Hollandsche Maatschappij der Wetenschappen =

Science academy

Coordinates: 52.3796°N 4.6397°E

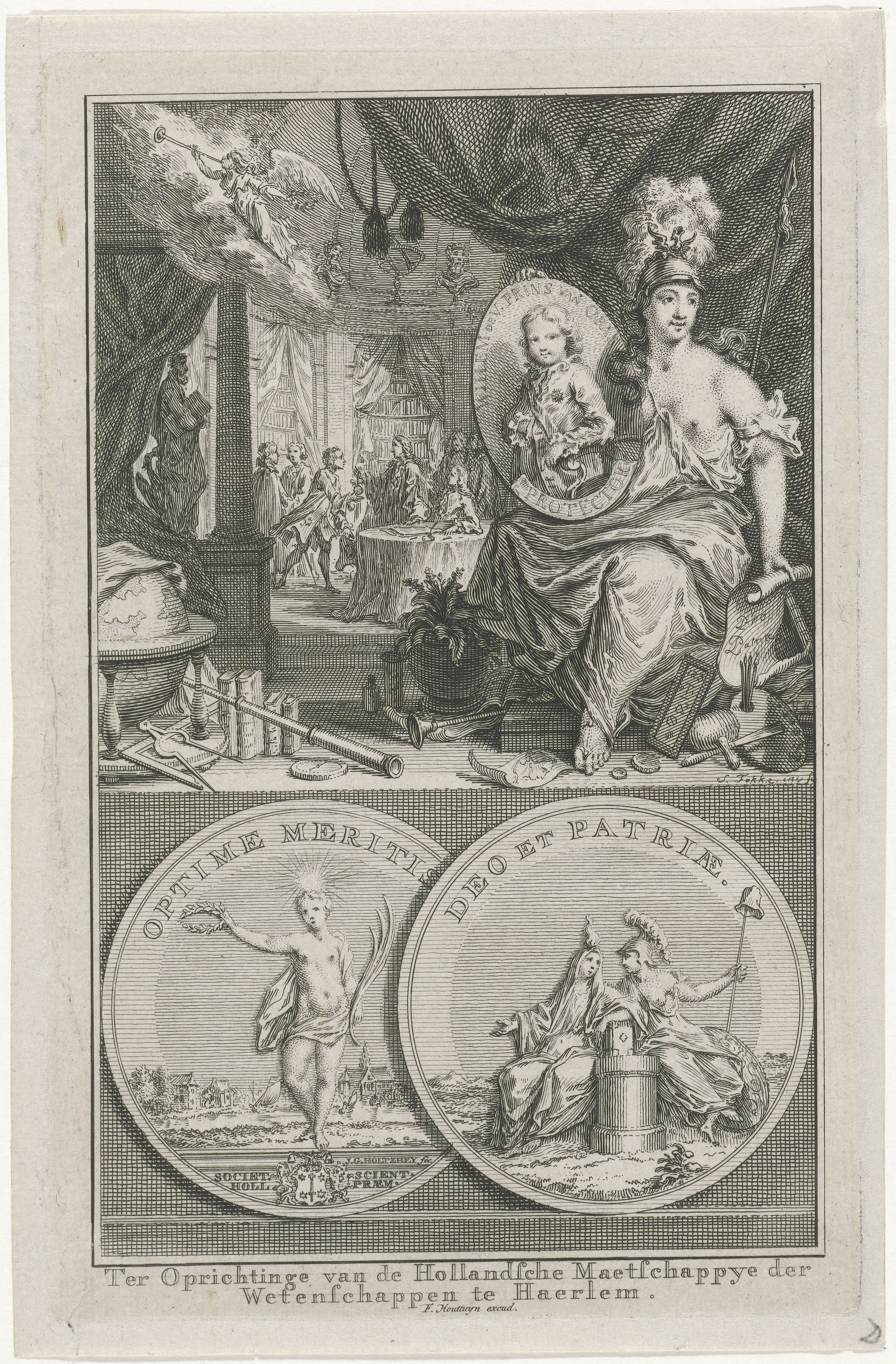
Commemorative print to celebrate the founding of the Dutch Society of Science in 1752, featuring the prize medal Johann Georg Holtzhey designed for them; engraving by Simon Fokke

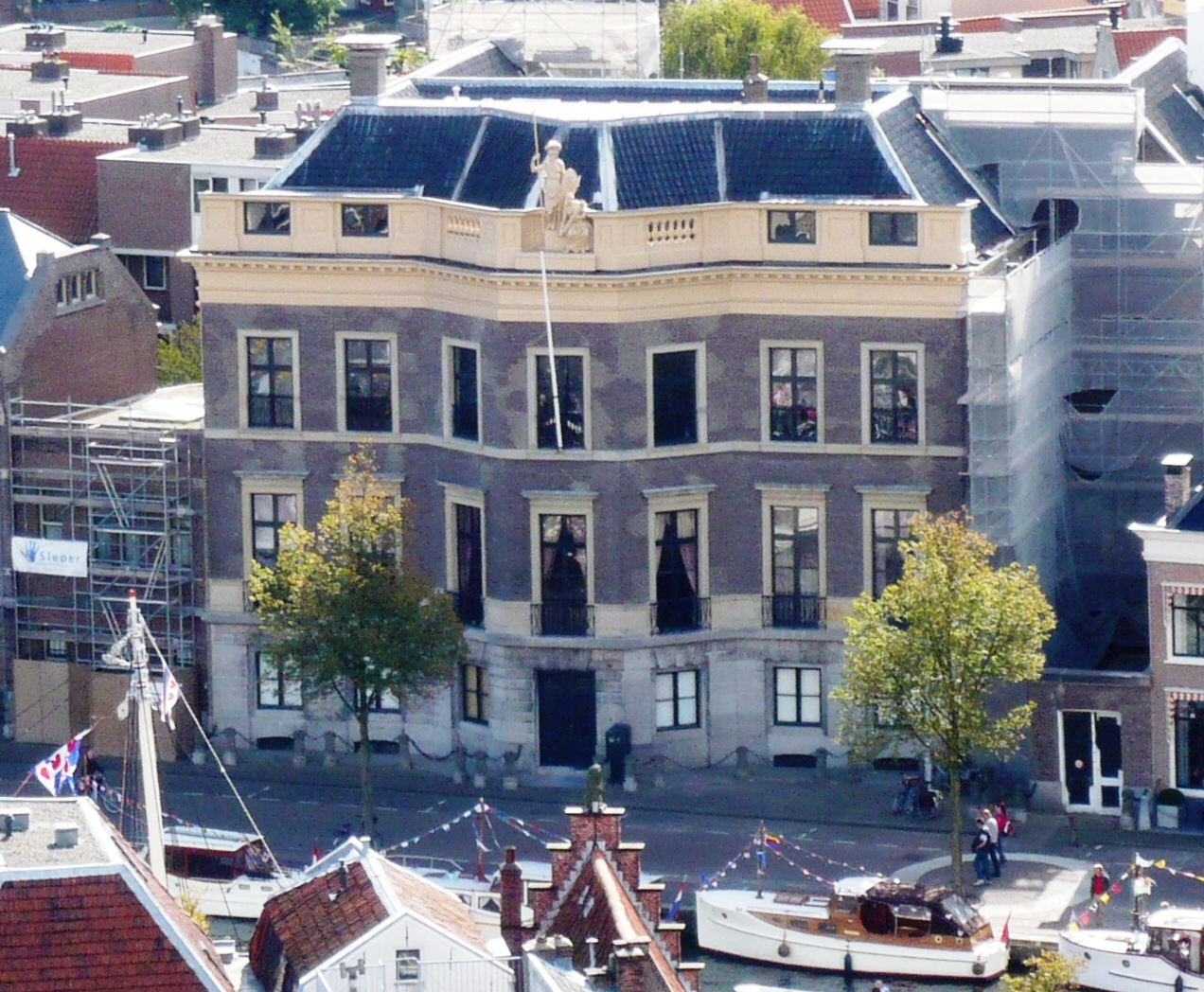
Hodshon house in Haarlem

The Koninklijke Hollandsche Maatschappij der Wetenschappen (Royal Holland Society of Sciences and Humanities), located on the east side of the Spaarne in downtown Haarlem, Netherlands, was established in 1752 and is the oldest society for the sciences in the country. The society has been housed in its present location, called Hodshon Huis, since 1841. Nearby the society is the Teylers Museum, a closely related museum of natural history founded in 1784. In 2002, the society was awarded the predicate "Royal" when it celebrated 250 years of science studies.

== History of the society and museum ==
The society started as a gentleman's club that met in the Haarlem City Hall to discuss science topics and promote the study of the arts and sciences. They pooled resources to purchase books and specimens for study, which were kept in the town hall until they purchased a building on the Grote Houtstraat (nr. 51, since unrecognizably rebuilt), where the curator of the collection lived. Under the direction of Martin van Marum, a proper museum was established with zoological specimens located there on display for the public, as a forerunner of the modern Naturalis in Leiden. Van Marum also kept a small garden for public viewing in the summer months, filled with special plants, located in the Bakkerstraat. The museum fell out of favor after Van Marum's death, and it was dissolved in 1866.

== Hodshon House ==
The house was built in 1794 by the architect Abraham van der Hart for Catharina Cornelia Hodshon, a wealthy heiress and regentess of the Wijnbergshofje. After she died, the house came into the hands of the Amsterdam banker Adriaan van der Hoop, and it was purchased for the society in 1841. The original mission of the society included research as well as education. There are many awards, prizes, and collaborative initiatives that are kept up by the society. Membership is by invitation only, and the historical building is open by appointment only. Today the building is owned by the nl:Vereniging Hendrick de Keyser.

== See also ==
- Royal Netherlands Academy of Arts and Sciences (KNAW)
- Christianus Carolus Henricus van der Aa
