= Catharina de Grebber =

Dutch kidnapping victim

- Born: c. 1496
- Died: After 1515
- Known for: Victim of kidnapping and rape

Catharina de Grebber (c. 1496 – after 1515) was a Dutch woman. At the age of 13, she was the victim of a famous case of kidnapping and rape in the Netherlands. The case was widely famed in the contemporary Netherlands, where it was published and popular within literature: it was also the subject of a song, where Catharina de Grebber was described as a rabbit persecuted by a hunter.

== Biography ==
Catharina de Grebber was the daughter of the wealthy shipper and patrician Pieter Claeszoon de Grebber and Alyt van Tetrode in Leiden. In September 1509, at the age of thirteen, she was abducted by the nobleman Gerrit van Raaphorst and four accomplices on her way to church with her father in Wassenaar. Raaphorst took her to Sassenheim, where he married her. During this period, she was reportedly raped and locked up. Four months later, she returned to her parents.

When Raaphorst wished to have her returned, her parents sued him for forcing her to marry him. Raaphorst claimed that both the marriage and intercourse were voluntary. The court case continued for years, until 1515, when Raaphorst was judged guilty for rape and sentenced to a public walk of repentance and to pay for a painted window in the church. Raaphorst was executed for the murder of a man in 1524. The life of Catharina de Grebber after 1515 is not known.

== See also ==
- List of kidnappings
- Lists of solved missing person cases
