= Walkersville High School =

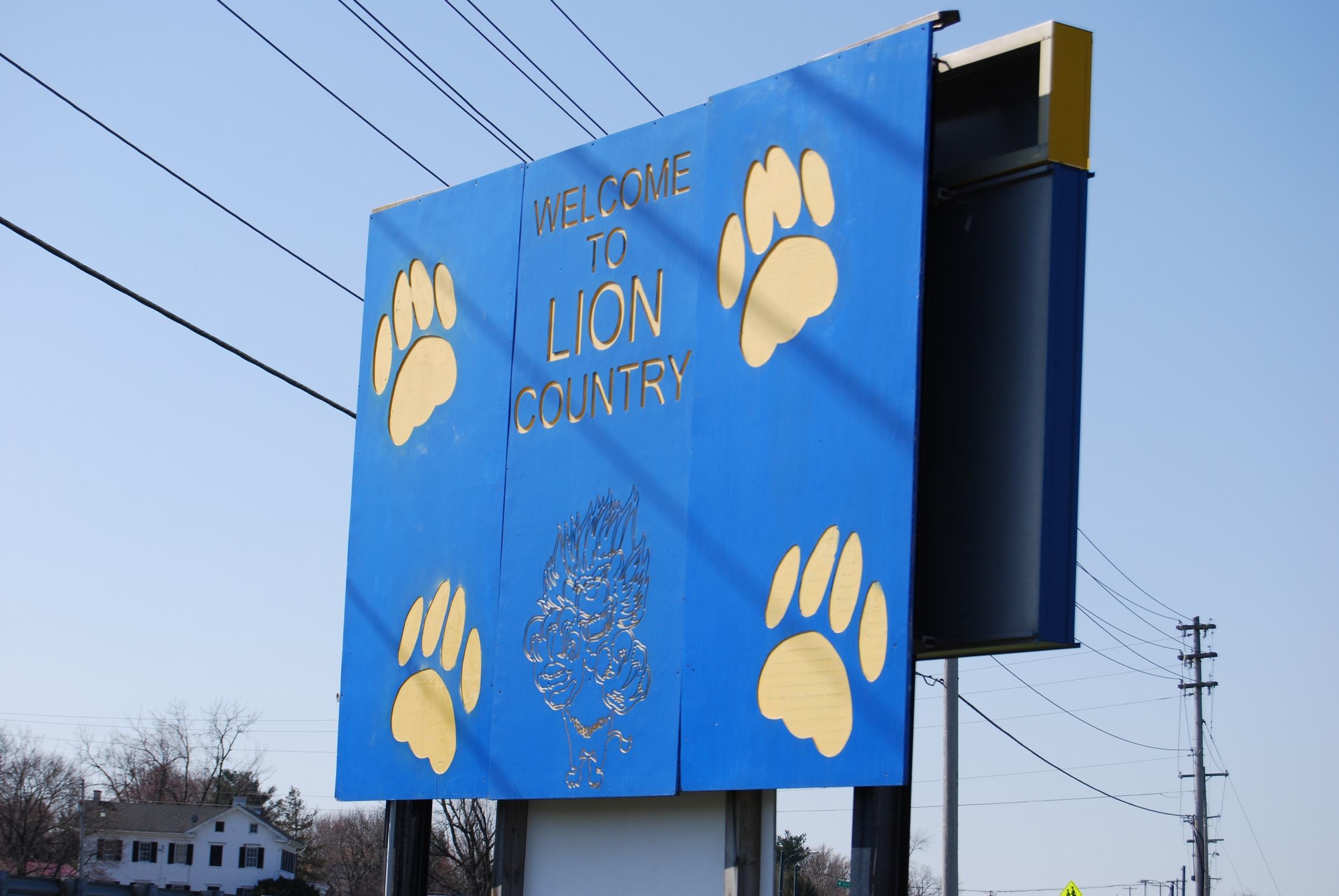

Location
- 81 W Frederick St; Walkersville, Maryland 21793; United States; 39°28′31″N 77°21′42″W

Information
- Type: Public high school
- Established: 1976; 50 years ago
- School district: Frederick County Public Schools
- NCES School ID: 240033000655
- Principal: Stephanie Ware
- Staff: 60 (FTE)
- Grades: 9–12
- Enrollment: 1,181 (2024–25)
- Student to teacher ratio: 19.68
- Campus: Rural
- Campus size: 49.97 acres (202,200 m^{2})
- Colors: Blue, Gold
- Mascot: Lion
- Rival: Middletown High School
- Newspaper: Lion's Pride
- Yearbook: Lyonian
- Website: education.fcps.org/whs/

Walkersville High School (WHS) is a four-year public high school in Walkersville, Frederick County, Maryland, United States. The school's colors are blue and gold and its athletic teams are known as the "Lions."

The school is located near the foothills of the Appalachian Mountains of Western Maryland in the town of Walkersville, along Maryland Route 194, east of U.S. 15, and north of Maryland Route 26.

== History ==
The construction of Walkersville High School began in 1974, and the school opened in 1976. An addition to the building was completed in 1999. The building now has 191,104 square feet (17,754.1 m^{2}) of space located on 49.97 acres (202,200 m^{2}) of land.

The original high school building is now Walkersville Middle School.

== Sports ==
State Champions

- 2024 - Marching Band
- 2016 - Football
- 2015 - Unified Track
- 2012 - Unified Tennis
- 2011 - Boys' Track & Field
- 2010 - Boys' Swim Team
- 2010 - Boys' Indoor Track & Field
- 2008 - Boys' Track & Field
- 2003 - Baseball
- 2003 - Girls' Basketball
- 1999 - Baseball
- 1999 - Softball
- 1996 - Softball
- 1987 - Football
- 1986 - Boys' Basketball
- 1984 - Boys' Basketball
- 1978 - Baseball
- 1972 - Boys' Soccer
- 1964 - Boys' Basketball
- 1960 - Boys' Basketball

== Notable alumni ==
- Tony Fiammetta, former NFL player
- Tineke "Tini" Younger, chef and social media influencer

== Image gallery ==
Walkersville High School has been located in several buildings over the years including the three shown below. The middle image is now Walkersville Middle School. The image on the right is now the Frederick County Public Schools Staff Development Center

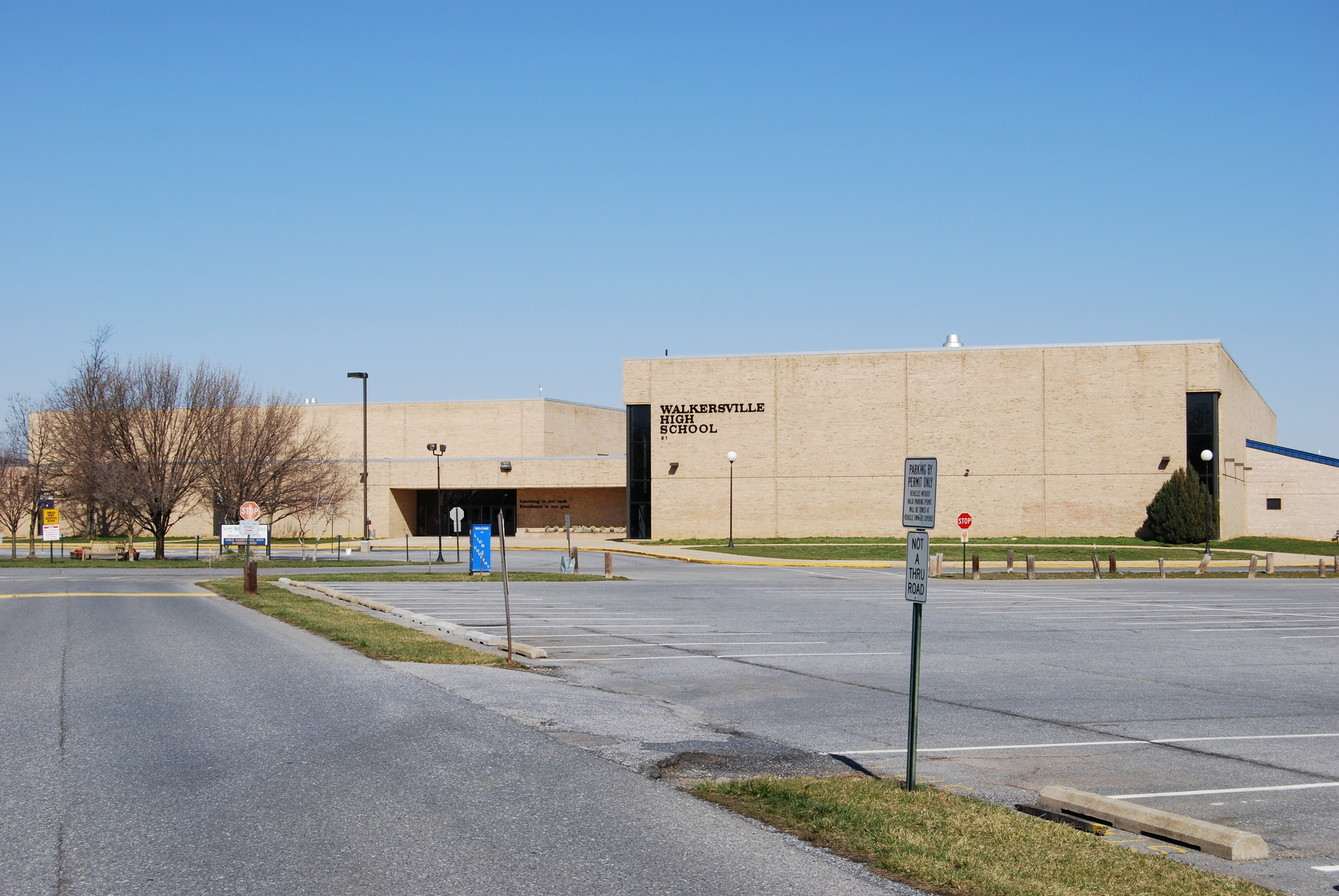
Current Walkersviile High School

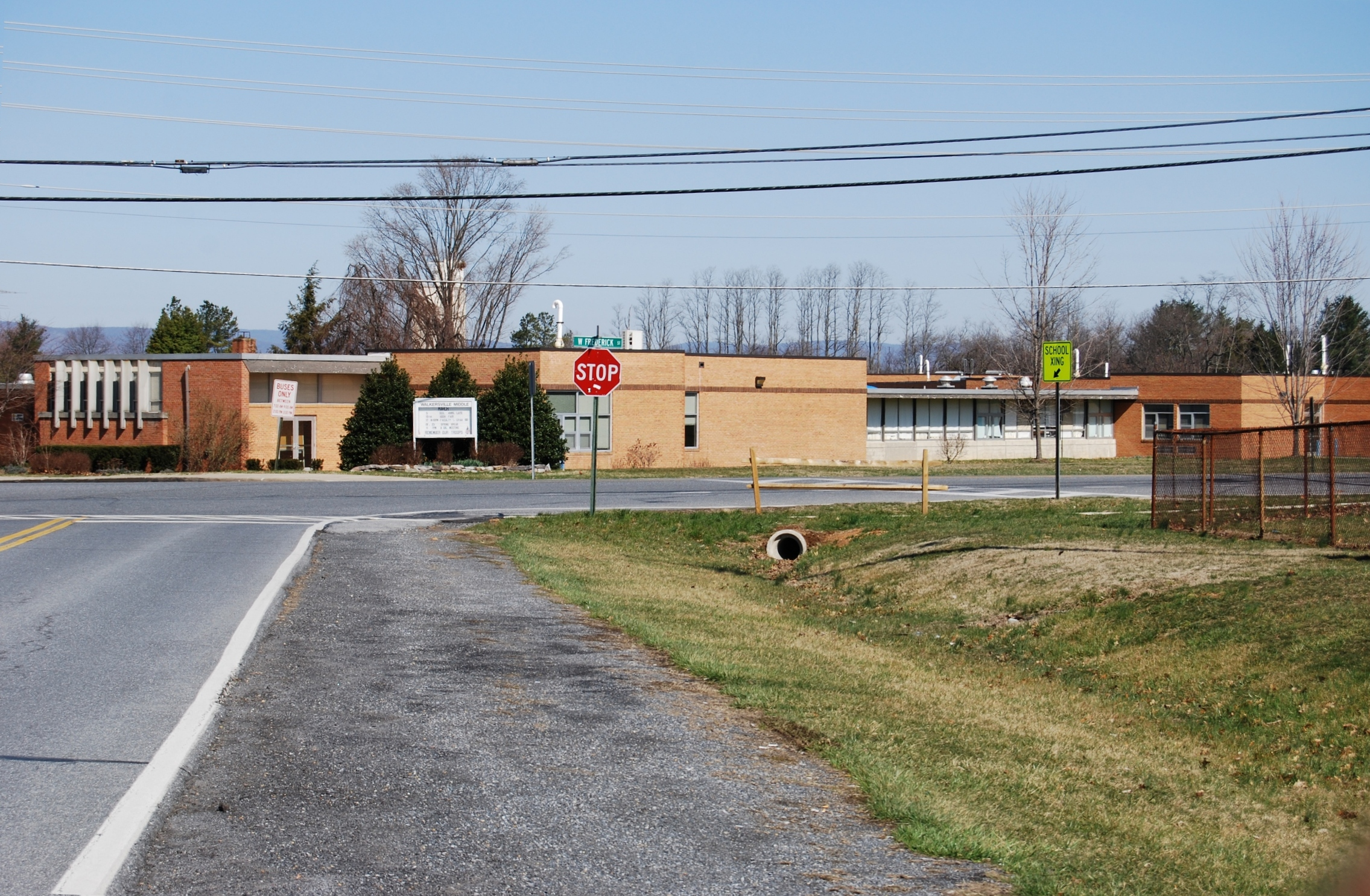
Walkersville Middle School

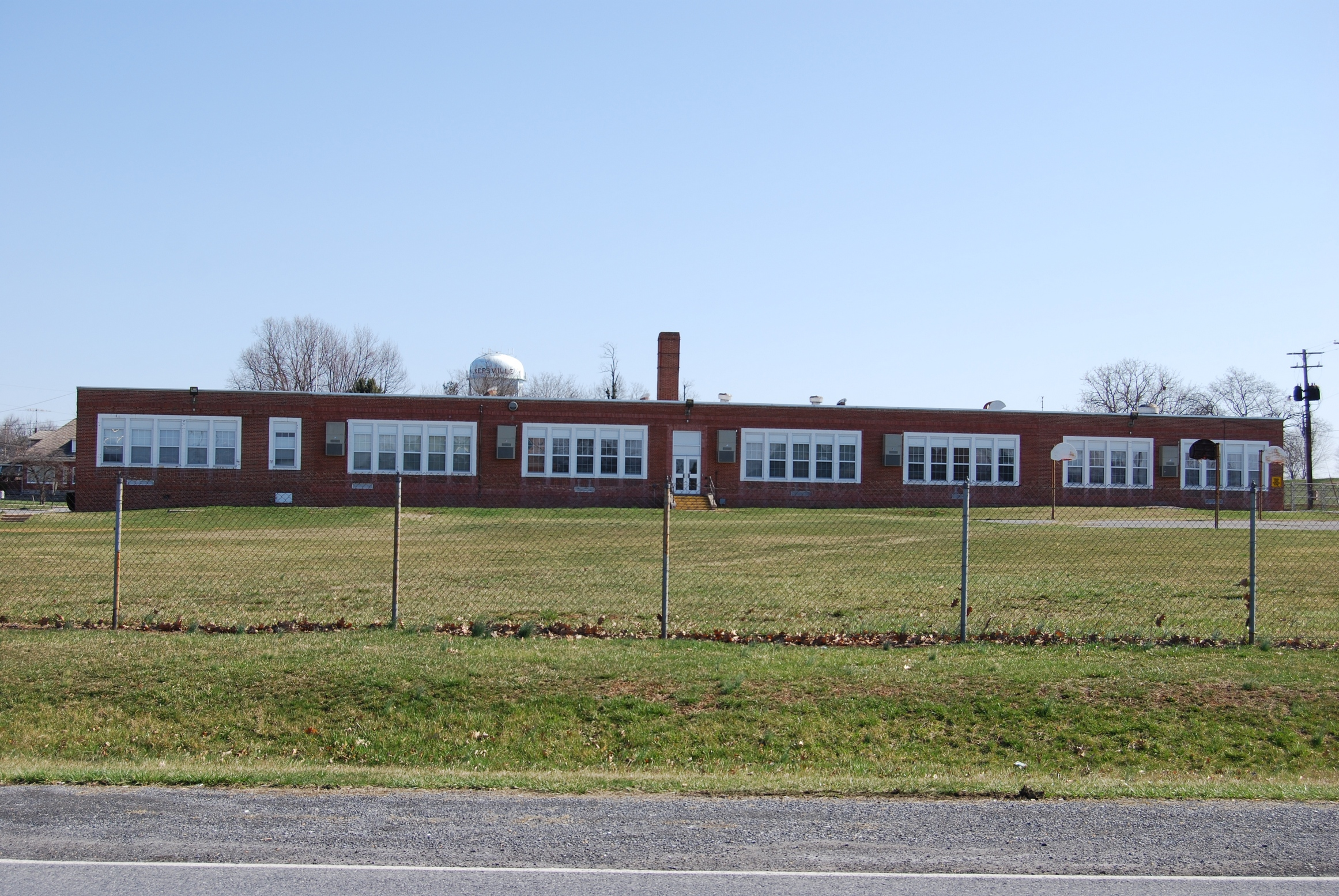
Walkersville High School early 1900s

== See also ==
- List of high schools in Maryland
- Frederick County Public Schools
