= Catharina Besselman =

Colonist in the Dutch East Indies

Catharina Besselman (1678-1702), was an influential Dutch colonist in the Dutch East Indies. She was famous for her unconventional lifestyle and the conflict between her spouse and the church which was caused because of it.

She was the daughter of merchant Johannes John and Christina Porcelius. Her father was manager of Tonkin and treasurer in the Castle of Batavia. She married first Dirk Hurdt (d. 1698), and in 1699 to the priest Johannes Kiezenga.

Besselman belonged to the most well known figures of 17th-century Batavia, known and famed for her unconventional love life and lifestyle. She loved parties and was alleged to have numerous love affairs and allegedly even supported a man financially in exchange for sex. During her widowhood in 1698-99, she was engaged four times, which was regarded as a scandal. She was refused communion by the church because of her lifestyle, which resulted in a famous court case between the church and her spouse, who insulted the clerical collegiate, who reported him to governor William Outshoorn. He was sentenced to return to the Netherlands, but she managed to have the verdict overturned because of her connections and influence in the colony.
