= Jessine =

Jessine جصين
- Village
- Location in Syria
- Coordinates: 35.1533489°N 37.1387909°E
- Country: Syria
- Governorate: Hama
- District: Salamiyah District
- Subdistrict: Sabburah Subdistrict

Population (2004)
  - Total: 301
- Time zone: UTC+3 (AST)
- City Qrya Pcode: C3299

Jessine (Arabic: جصين) is a Syrian village located in Sabburah Subdistrict in Salamiyah District, Hama. According to the Syria Central Bureau of Statistics (CBS), Jessine had a population of 301 in the 2004 census. It was settled by Dagestanis in the late 19th century.
