= Catharina Anna Grandon de Hochepied =

Hungarian and Swedish noblewoman

Catharina Anna Grandon de Hochepied (21 May 1767 – 1803) was a Hungarian and Swedish noble. As the wife of the Swedish ambassador in the Ottoman Empire, she became the likely first woman ever to have performed on stage in Islamic Turkey.

Born to the Hungarian count Jan Daniel Grandon de Hochepied, she married Gerhard von Heidenstam, the Swedish ambassador of the Ottoman Empire, in 1783 and moved with him to Istanbul, where they lived.

Heidenstam organized an amateur theatre at the Swedish hotel in the Pera district of the city. In 1786, the theatre opened with the opera L’ecole des Jaloux, the first Italian opera ever performed in Turkey and, likely, in the Muslim world. The music was played by the embassy staff. Catharina Anna participated in the opera, together with a couple of other amateur actresses from the embassy staff's families, in front of three hundred spectators, thereby becoming perhaps the first woman ever to perform on a public stage in a Muslim country. She was complimented on her performance by members of the audience, which consisted of both foreign diplomats and Muslim nobles.
