= Ineke Mulder =

Dutch politician

C.A.M. (Ineke) Mulder (born August 30, 1950 in Groningen) is a former Dutch politician of the Labour Party.

From early 2003 until early 2008 she was deputy of the Groningen provincial council responsible for welfare, healthcare, education, sports, events, personnel and facility management. As a deputy she was a member of the permanent delegation of the Social Policy Association of Provincial Authorities (IPO) in which she devoted herself to improving youth care.

In March 2008 she resigned from her post because of adverse complications in the Youth Bureau and its inability to rectify its problems.

Mulder began her career as a teacher in a school for severely maladjusted children. She continued her career in education and eventually became unit director of marketing and business services for the ROC Noorderpoortcollege, a group of schools in Groningen and Drenthe.
