= Catharina Serafin =

Prussian medical patient

Catharina Serafin was a Prussian lady. She had an enchondroma removed from her cardiac region, leaving the chest wall open except for a thin skin layer. This allowed the German physician Hugo von Ziemssen in 1892 to do the first cardiac pacing experiments ever. These experiments gave an understanding of how the heart works electrically.
