= Catharina de Chasseur =

Dutch counterfeiter

Catharina de Chasseur also known as Catherine le Sasseure and Catherine Dechassoir (c. 1490 - 1541), was a Dutch counterfeiter. She was the central figure of a famous criminal court case which has often been referenced in Dutch literature.

She was the daughter of an innkeeper in Orléans. In 1507, she married the Dutch noble Gerrit van Assendelft (1487–1558) and followed him to the Netherlands. The couple separated, but she was given an allowance, and settled in the Hague. In 1532, her spouse deprived her of her allowance. In 1540, false coins started to circulate in the Netherlands. The same year, two young Frenchmen moved into her house, and her neighbors reportedly heard the sound of metal processing from her home. On the night of 11 February 1541, Catharina de Chasseur and her entire household were arrested for coining. In the subsequent trial, she was judged guilty as charged and sentenced to death by burning. Her sentence was reduced by the Regent to execution by beheading.
