= Van Raaphorst =

Van Raaphorst is a surname. Notable people with the surname include:

- Dick Van Raaphorst (1942–2020), American football player
- Jeff Van Raaphorst (born 1963), American football player
- Mike Van Raaphorst (born 1978), American football player
