= Susanne Nies =

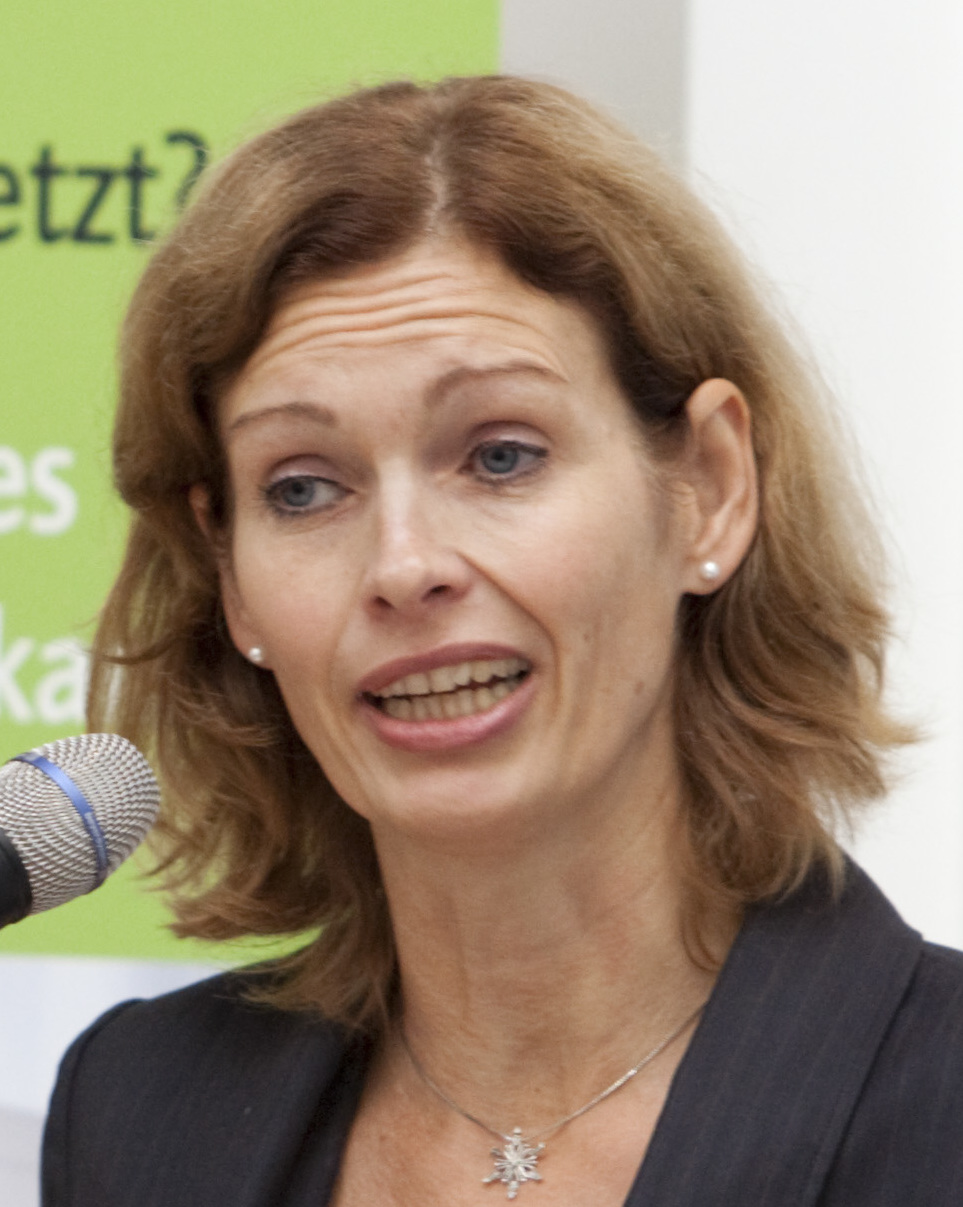
Susanne Nies in 2012

Susanne Nies is an energy and climate professional and political scientist, specialising in EU and Eastern Europe. She served in various roles across the industry and in think tanks. She is currently project lead at Helmholtz Zentrum Berlin. She is also the chair of the Board of Fraunhofer IEE, Kassel.

Other positions include, from March 2020 to March 2023, as General Manager Germany DACH at Smart Wires, ENTSO-E.

== Biography ==
Susanne Nies is a German national by origin. She holds a PhD from Bonn University and a Habilitation from Berlin Free University, as well as Sciences Po Paris, in Political Sciences, in International Relations, slavistics, romanistics. She also owns an MBA and an economics degree from London School of Economics.

From 2015 to 2020, Susanne Nies has headed the Corporate Affairs Section of the European Association of Transmission Network Operators, ENTSO-E. Until then she was Head of Unit Distribution System Operators with EURELECTRIC, the European electricity sector association based in Brussels, since June 2014. Before and from 2010 she was heading the Energy Policy and Power Generation Department for the same association.

Previously she was heading the French Institute for International Relations Brussels branch and was affiliated as a senior researcher to the energy programme of the Institute; was working with CERI and IRIS, Free University Berlin, CIFE Nice and Heinrich Boell Foundation. She has a long track of academic publication on energy, international relations and Eastern Europe:

Her publications include a master work on ´the stalinism debate in Sovietunion´ (unpublished), publications on Memorial, the first partner of Heinrich Boell Stiftung in Sovietunion, a PhD on Latvia in the international politics (1995), as well as on energy networks - first gas and oil to Europe and then at the speed of light, electricity interconnections for Europe published in 2010. She published as editor and author ´The European Energy Transition: an Agenda for the Twenties, prefaced by Jacques Delors and with multiple experts contributing. Recent publications relate to energy and climate in Ukraine and Eastern Europe. She is a regular contributor to media articles and interviews and to events.

She speaks fluently German, English, French and Russian.
