= Pauline Johanna Gesine Mouthaan =

Dutch artist

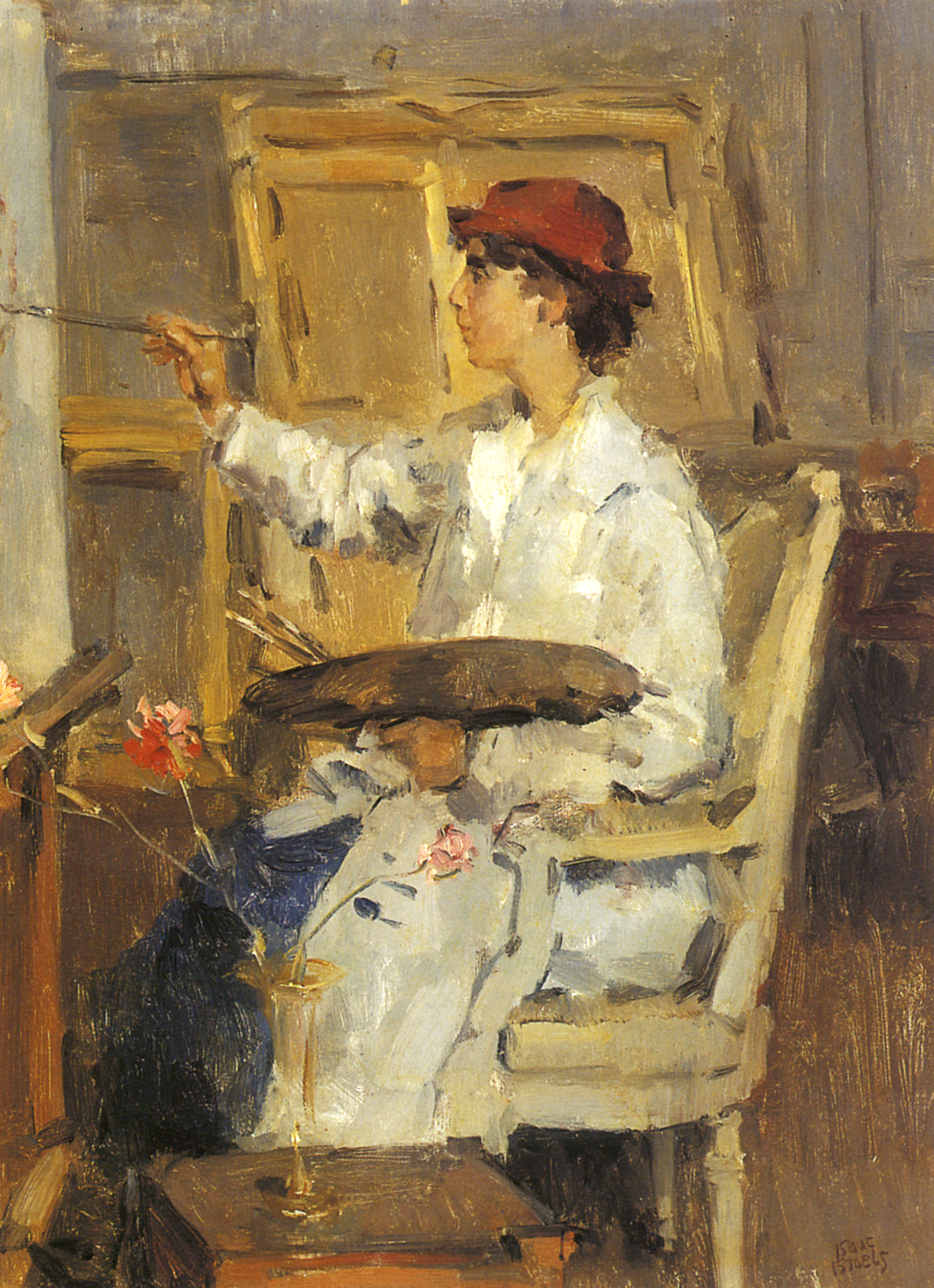
- portrait of Mouthaan c. 1918, by Isaac Israëls
- Born: 29 January 1892; Vrijenban, Netherlands
- Died: 12 August 1969; Ekeren, Belgium
- Other names: Pauline Johanna Gesine van Heukelom
- Known for: Painting
- Spouse: W.E. van Heukelom

Pauline Johanna Gesine Mouthaan (1892-1969) was a Dutch artist.

== Biography ==
Paula Mouthaan was born on 29 January 1892 in Vrijenban. Mouthaan studied at the Rijksakademie van beeldende kunsten (State Academy of Fine Arts). Her teachers included Henk Meijer (kunstenaar) and Arend Odé. In 1918, she was the recipient of the Cohen Godschalk Prize. Her work was included in the 1939 exhibition and sale Onze Kunst van Heden (Our Art of Today) at the Rijksmuseum in Amsterdam. Mouthaan was a member of the Arti et Amicitiae and the Pulchri Studio.
