= Tineke Younger =

American chef and content creator

- Born: Tineke Younger; Walkersville, Maryland, USA
- Other name: Tini Younger
- Occupations: Chef and Internet personality
- Notable work: Cooking for my Boyfriend
- Television: Next Level Chef Season 2
- Spouse: Antoine Wright Jr. (m. 2024)
- Children: 2 (Note: Including 1 stillborn.)

TikTok information
- Page: tinekeyounger
- Followers: 11 million
- Last updated: May 11, 2025

Tineke "Tini" Younger (/ˈtinəkə ˈjʌŋɡər/ TEE-nə-kə YUNG-ər) is an American chef, cookbook author, and social media personality, known for her macaroni and cheese recipe. She runs acounts on social media where she shares recipes and cooking techniques.

== Early life and career ==
Younger was born and raised in Walkersville, Maryland. She learned to cook through culinary programs she enrolled in while she was a student at Walkersville High School and Frederick Community College. Younger was a contestant on the second season of Next Level Chef, finishing in eighth place, and appeared in season three as a special guest. Following the show, she had a YouTube show on Gordon Ramsay's Bite Originals channel. She published a cookbook called Cooking for my Boyfriend in 2023.

As of 2026, Younger has roughly 16 million combined followers across social media.

In 2026, she was named one of Forbes 30 under 30 in Food and Drink.

On November 3, 2026, she released her highly anticipated cookbook, "Today We Are Cooking, Recipes That Teach You to Think Like a Chef", immediately becoming a #1 New York Times bestseller.

== Macaroni and cheese recipe ==
On November 2023, Younger posted a macaroni and cheese recipe that gained over 100 million views on TikTok that significantly increased her online following.

The recipe is known for using cavatappi pasta and a mixture of many cheeses, including sharp cheddar, Colby Jack, and mozzarella cheese.

Younger is partly responsible for a nation-wide cavatappi pasta shortage during the holiday times.

== Personal life ==
Younger met her husband Antoine Wright Jr. in 2019. They became engaged in November 2023, and were married on November 12, 2024 in Jamaica.

The couple announced on June 20, 2025 that they were expecting twin girls. On November 26, Younger announced that her twins had been born at 36 weeks following a placental abruption, and one of her daughters had died.
