= Christianus Carolus Henricus van der Aa =

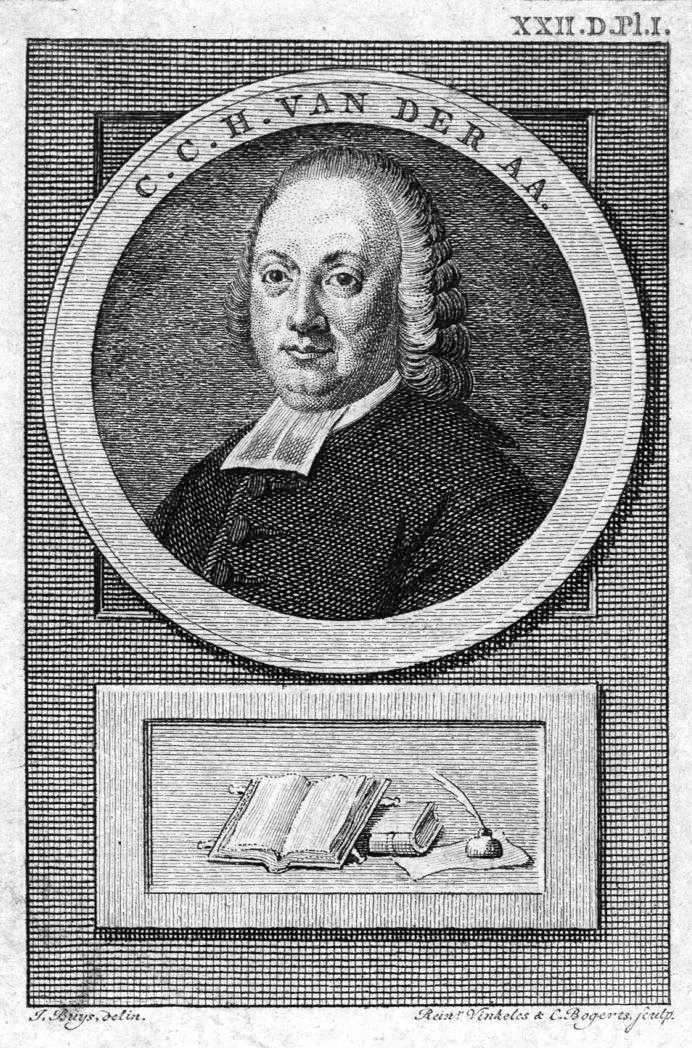
Christianus Carolus Henricus van der Aa (by Reinier Vinkeles and Cornelis Bogerts)

Christianus Carolus Henricus van der Aa (25 August 1718 – 23 September 1793) was a Lutheran pastor in the Netherlands and secretary of the Royal Holland Society of Sciences and Humanities.

== Life ==
Christianus Carolus Henricus was born in Zwolle, where his father Balduinus also worked as a pastor.

He studied theology first in Leiden, and later in Jena. On 22 March 1739 he became a Lutheran pastor in Alkmaar, then on 12 August 1742 become a preacher in Haarlem (he had previously been twice, thanks to a job in Gouda).

In Haarlem, at the creation of the Royal Holland Society of Sciences and Humanities in 1752, where he would play a major role, he was appointed as secretary. Thanks to this he entered into two equally honourable positions, namely at The Hague in 1755 and later in Batavia, Dutch East Indies. He died on the night of 22-23 September 1793 in Haarlem.

Several of his sermons have appeared in print.

== Works ==
- Verhandelingen over den aart van het gebed, in 32 bedestonden, Haarlem, 1747. (2nd edition, 1793)
- Een-en-twintig Predikatiën over gewigtige onderwerpen, Haarlem, 1748 (2nd edition, 1784)
- Onderzoek der hoofdoogmerken van onzen Heer J.C., in eenige der voornaamste gevallen zijns levens, Haarlem, 1755. (2nd edition, 1793)
- Vier Predikatiën gehouden te Schiedam, bij gelegenheid van de oprigting dier gemeente enz., Haarlem, 1758, 8°. (2nd edition, 1793)
- De Mensch als Gods beeld beschouwd, Haarlem, 1769.
- Leerrede over II. Cor. V. vs. 20: ter bevestiging van Ds. P.A. Hulsbeek, Haarlem, 1784.
- Aanspraak in het Luthersche Weeshuis te Haarlem, den 20 Januarij 1789, bij de viering der vijftigste verjaring van dat Godshuis, 1789
- De vereischte van ware godsvrucht, om Gods beeld op aarde te wezen. Haarlem 1792.
- 's Menschen ingang tot heerlijkheid, om in het toekomende leven Gods beeld in volkomenheid te wezen, 3 dln., Haarlem, 1792.
- Leerrede over II Petri I. vs. 12-14, ter gedachtenis van zijnen 50jarigen Predikdienst bij de gemeente te Haarlem, 1792.

== Family ==
He married Catharina Koopman on 16 October 1742; they had at least one son.
