= Catharina Herman =

Dutch heroine of the Eighty Years' War

Catharina Herman (died after 1604) was a Dutch heroine of the Eighty Years' War. She was hailed in history as a role model of marital fidelity.

She was from Medemblik and married to a soldier whose name has been lost. In 1600, her spouse was sent to participate in the defense of Ostend against the Spaniards. When Ostend fell in 1604, she sold her property and left for Ostend posing as a man in an attempt to free her spouse from Spanish captivity. She was arrested for suspected spying and imprisoned, but in prison, her sex was discovered by a Jesuit, to whom she confided her mission. When told her spouse was to be executed, she requested to die with him. When the Jesuit told this to the commander, Charles Bonaventure de Longueval, Count of Bucquoy, he allowed the couple to be set free.

Catharina Herman was included in the dictionaries Femmes illustres by Hilarion de Coste, Les eloges et les vies des reynes, des princesses, et des dames illustres en pieté, en courage & en doctrine (1647) Groot algemeen historisch, geographisch, genealogisch en oordeelkundig woordenboek (1733) by David van Hoogstraten, a play by Jan Jacob Vereul in 1793, and a novel by J. Honig in 1840.
