= Tineke Hofland =

Dutch swimmer (born 1954)

Personal information
- Full name: Martina Maria Hofland
- Born: 14 January 1954 (age 72) The Hague, South Holland, Netherlands

Sport
- Sport: Swimming

Martina ("Tineke") Maria Hofland (born 14 January 1954 in The Hague, South Holland) is a former breaststroke swimmer from the Netherlands, who competed for her native country at the 1972 Summer Olympics in Munich, West Germany. There she was eliminated in the qualifying heats of the 100m Breaststroke, clocking 1:19.38.
