= Gesine Spieß =

Gesine Spieß (1945–2016) was a German educationalist at the University of Applied Sciences in Erfurt (Fachhochschule Erfurt) where she specialized in gender studies. In 1988, she became the first women's representative in Düsseldorf where she developed a women's advancement plan for the city. She is also remembered as an expert in women in management and in policies for advancing gender equality.

== Biography ==
Born in Glöwen in the municipality of Plattenburg on 10 January 1945, Gesine Spieß studied educational science at the University of Düsseldorf. She earned her doctorate in 1982 under the cognitive psychologist Gudula List. Spieß taught at the University of Düsseldorf and was a research assistant with the German Research Foundation. In 1994, she was appointed professor at the Erfurt University of Applied Sciences where she specialized in gender studies. Following her retirement in 2011, she lectured widely on topics addressing gender, including gender in politics.

Spieß was one of the pioneers of equality policy in German municipalities. She first became a women's representative in Solingen before joining the municipality of Düsseldorf in 1988 where she built up the women's office into a strong, publicly respected and politically effective body. From 1986 to 1989, she served as spokeswoman for the federal working group of municipal women's representatives. She is also remembered for establishing the women's trade fair in collaboration with Messe Düsseldorf in 1991 at which representatives of companies, politics and culture discussed equality issues together. The event was held every second year until 1999, attracting great public interest.

In 2000, promoting gender equality, Spieß prepared an extensive report on Frauen in Führungspositionen (Women in Management) for the Association of German Cities.

Gesine Spieß died in Düsseldorf on 4 December 2016.
