= Catharina Johanna Koek =

Dutch governor's wife

Catharina Johanna Koek (1763–1843), was a Dutch governor's wife. She is depicted in history as a typical example of the Dutch colonial customs in Dutch East Indies and how it was viewed by Europeans.

She was the daughter of the official Joost Koek (1731-1790) and Catharina de Roth. She married in 1778 to the official Joan George Abeleven (1747-1781), and in 1781 to Abraham Couperus (1752-1813), governor of Malacca 1788-1795.

Her mother was born as the illegitimate daughter of a European man and a freed slave, which was not at all uncommon of her class. She wore a mixture of Dutch and native clothes, wore her hair in a bun as an Asian, and chewed areca nut. She was also a friendly and warm person who behaved in accordance with European etiquette; all very common and in the habits of the colonists of the Dutch East Indies, but considered by other Europeans at the time as a sign of the decadence of the Dutch East Indies.

She astonished the British who met her in 1795, when Dutch Malacca was taken by Great Britain and she and her family were taken captive to Tranquebar in India. They settled in Batavia in 1811 and she and her spouse became regarded as the founders of the influential Couperus family clan, where she became a respected family matriarch in traditional history.
