= Rini Dobber =

Dutch swimmer

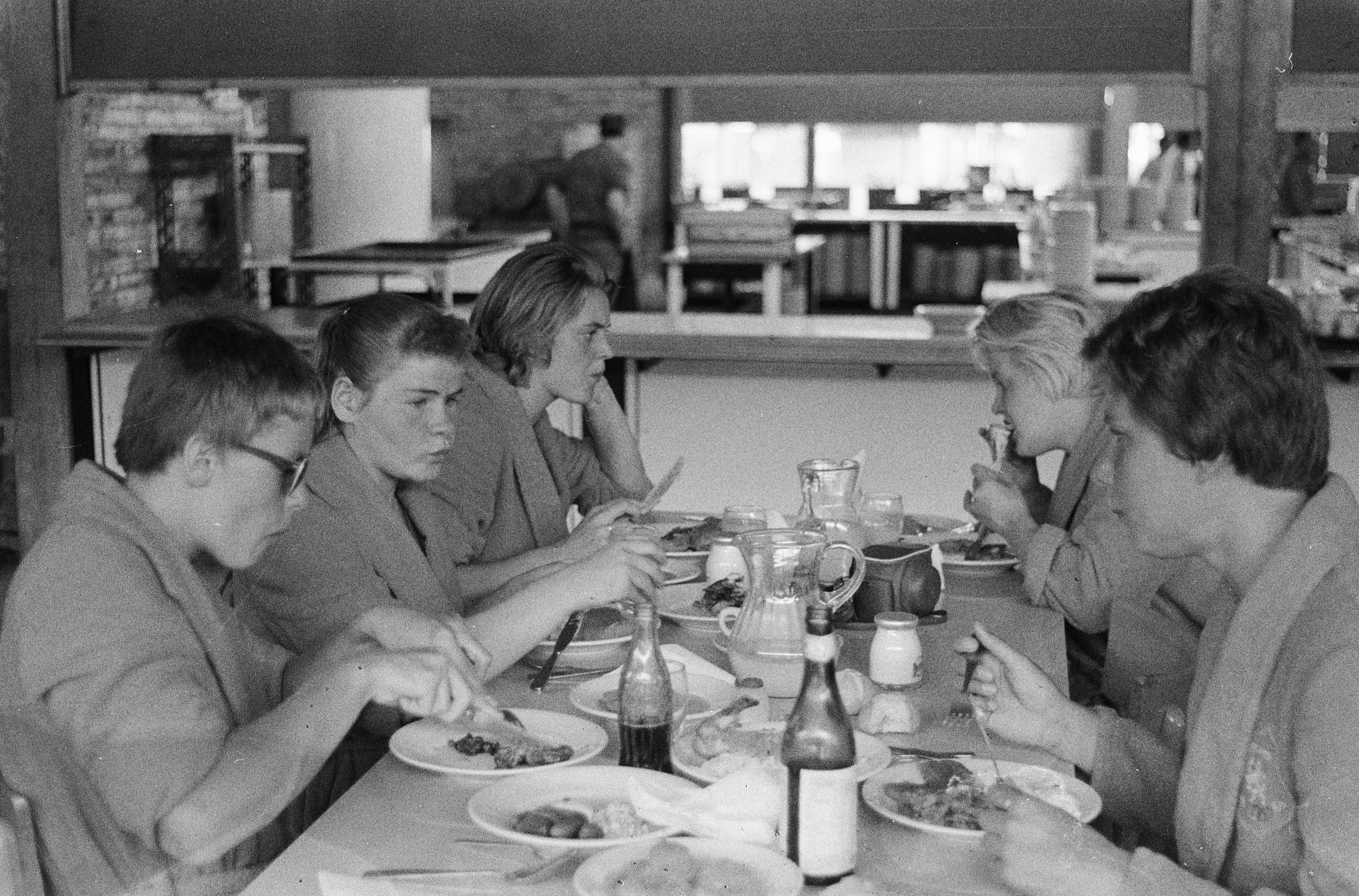
- Dutch swimmers at the 1960 Olympics, Dobber is second from left

Personal information
- Born: 1 January 1943 (age 83) Amsterdam, the Netherlands
- Height: 1.68 m (5 ft 6 in)
- Weight: 62 kg (137 lb)

Sport
- Sport: Swimming
- Club: HDZ, Amsterdam

Catharina Clasina "Rini" Dobber (born 1 January 1943) is a retired Dutch swimmer. She competed at the 1960 Summer Olympics in the 100 m backstroke, but failed to reach the final. Dobber set three national backstroke records in 1959–1960.
