= Nynke Laverman =

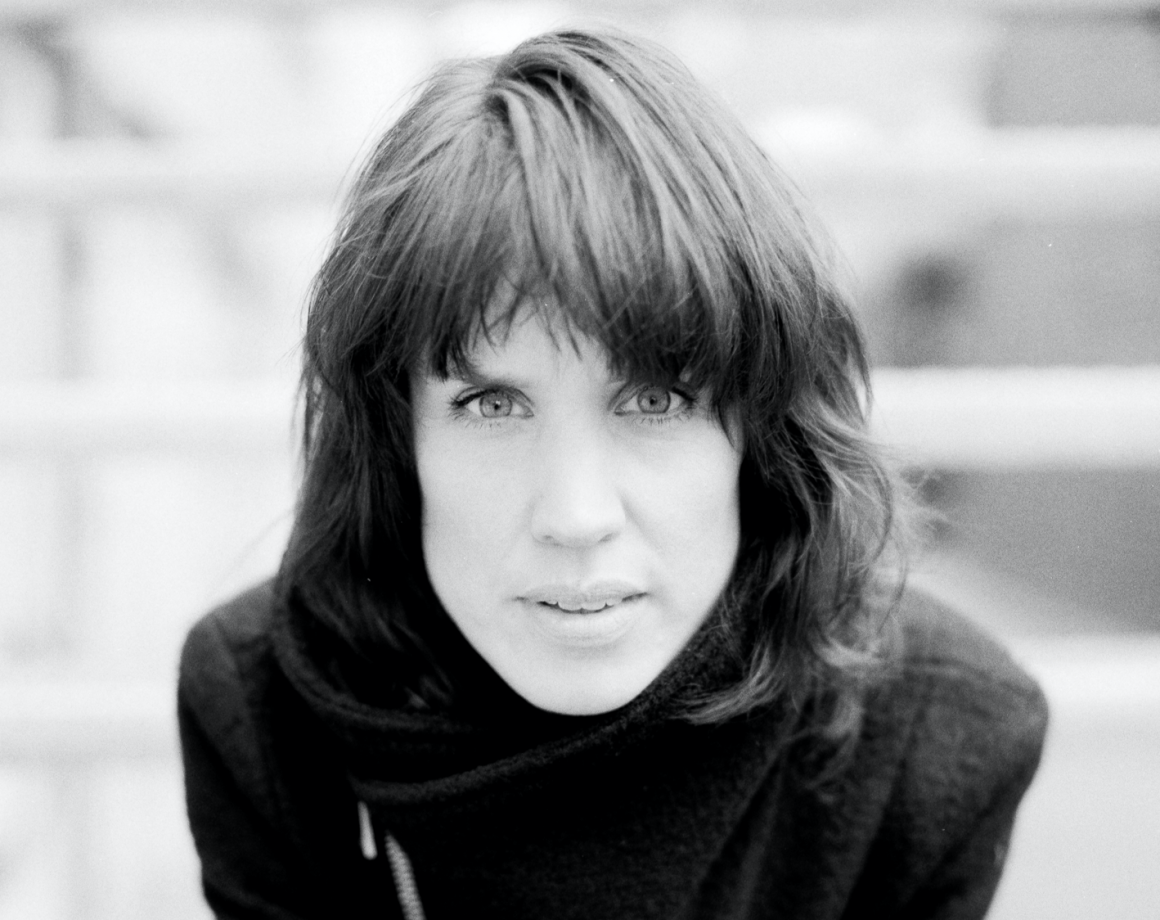
Nynke Laverman, 2020.

Nynke Laverman (pronounced [ˈniŋkə ˈlaːvərˌmɑn]; born 14 April 1980 in Weidum) is a Dutch poet, songwriter, spoken-word artist, explorer, theatre maker and singer. She writes and performs in (West) Frisian.

She is married to composer and sound artist Sytze Pruiksma.

== Albums ==
(with highest position and number of weeks in Dutch Album Top 100)

- Sielesâlt (2004; No. 41, 48 weeks)
- De Maisfrou (2006; No. 16, 25 weeks)
- Nomade (2009; No. 31, 10 weeks)
- Alter (2013; No. 71, 2 weeks)
- Wachter (2016)
- Plant (2021)
