= Abraham van der Hart =

Dutch architect

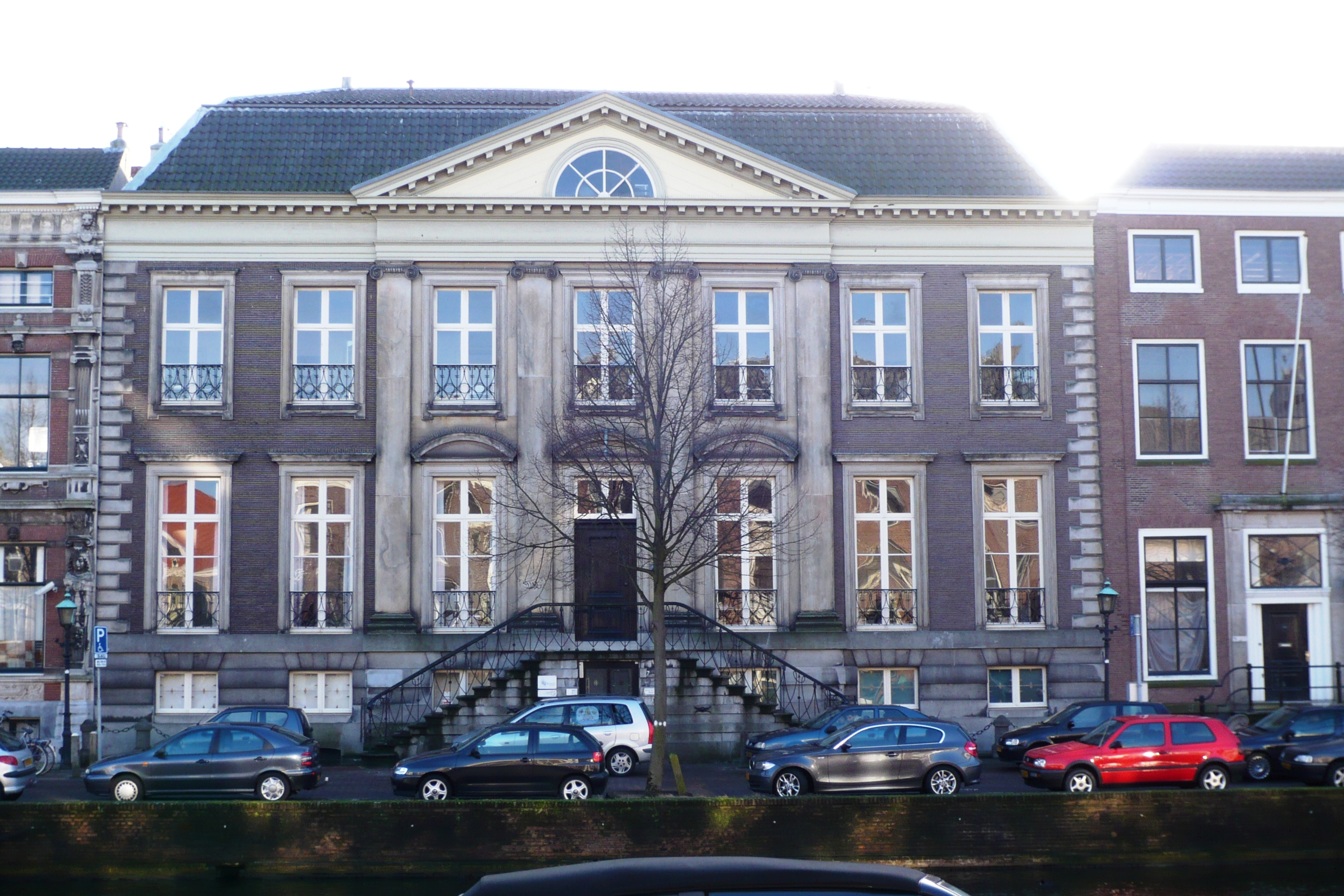
Huis Barnaart on the Nieuwe Gracht, Haarlem

Abraham van der Hart (1747 or 1757, Amsterdam – 1820, Amsterdam) was an 18th-century architect from the Northern Netherlands.

== Biography ==
According to the RKD he learned architecture and draughtsmanship from his father, Jan van der Hart, and became an architect specialized in Neoclassicism, who built the Hodson house, Villa Welgelegen and Barnaart house in Haarlem. In Amsterdam, he built the theatre De Kleine Komedie and redesigned the Trippenhuis in 1815–1817 to house an art and print cabinet that later merged with the Rijksmuseum.

He was member of the Royal Institute, predecessor to the Royal Netherlands Academy of Arts and Sciences, since 1808.
