= Catharina Nies =

German politician (born 1985)

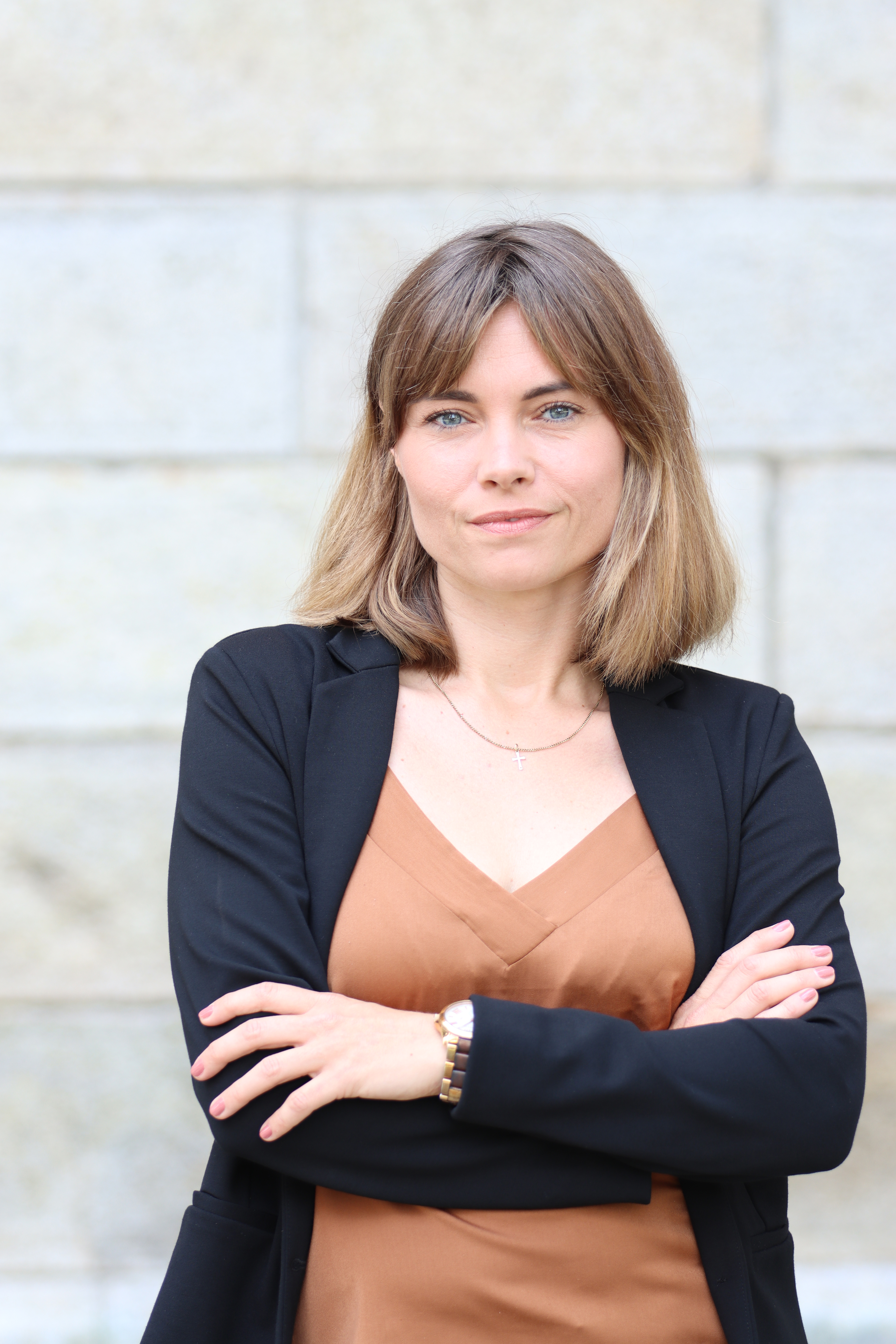
- Nies in 2022

Member of the Landtag of Schleswig-Holstein
- Incumbent
- Assumed office 7 June 2022

Personal details
- Born: 11 May 1985 (age 41)
- Party: Alliance 90/The Greens (since 2008)

Catharina Nies (born 11 May 1985) is a German politician serving as a member of the Landtag of Schleswig-Holstein since 2022. From 2009 to 2011, she served as co-spokesperson of the Green Youth in Schleswig-Holstein.
