= Sir Henry Lello =

Englisn ambassador to Ottoman Empire c. 1597–1607

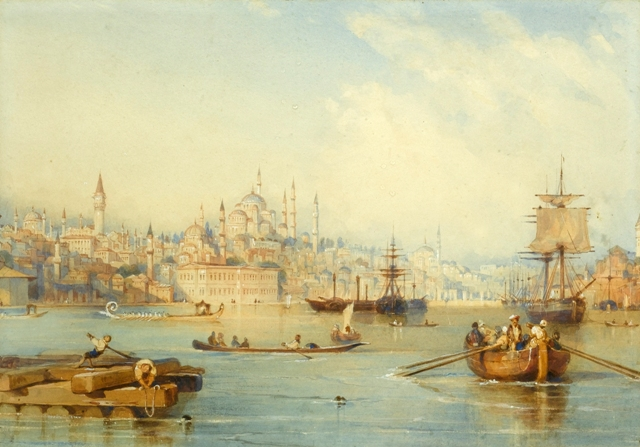
View of Constantinople where Lello resided as English ambassador to the Ottoman Empire

Sir Henry Lello was the English ambassador to the Ottoman Empire, Warden of the Fleet Prison, and Keeper of the Palace of Westminster. He was involved in peace negotiations with the Habsburgs and the Ottomans, as well as with the Venetian and French ambassadors regarding the trading activities in the Levant.

== Biography ==
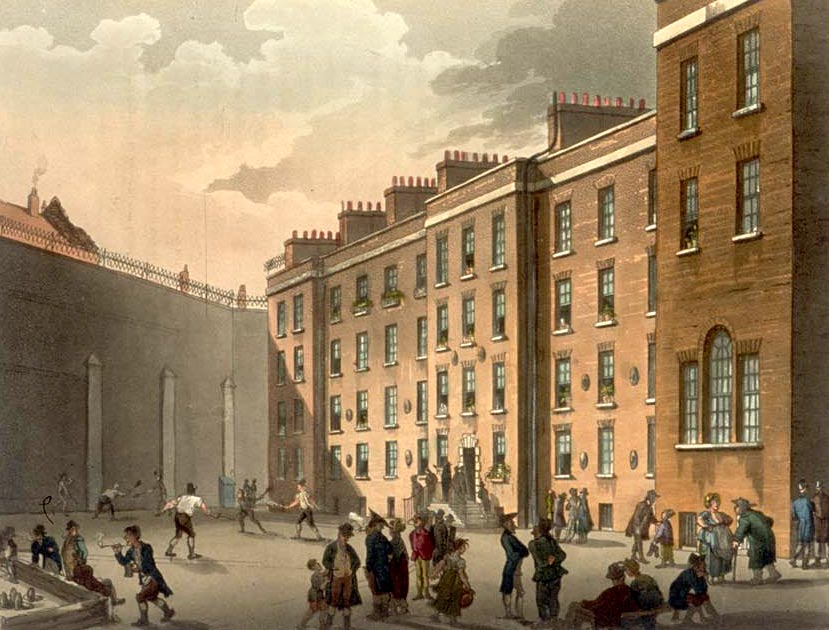
The Fleet Prison in London, Sir Henry Lello became its Warden after buying the office from Sir Robert Tyrrel, Knight, for £11,000 in 1594

Lello went to Constantinople as an attache to the English Embassy to the Sublime Porte of the Ottoman Empire, but originally as secretary to Edward Barton. In 1597 he took his place as ambassador. During his tenure, he wrote letters to the Secretary of State, Sir Robert Cecil, about the actions of the Persian ambassador while in Constantinople, and the relationship between the Sultan and the Tsar of Russia.

As ambassador he was less popular in the court than his predecessors William Harborne and Sir Edward Barton and was less comfortable also, at one point stating that he was shocked by the extent of the violence and intrigue in the court of Sultan Mehmed III and his mother Safiye Sultan, and in 1607 complaining that bribery was so widespread that the economy was now driven by the level of corruption and that neither religious or civil law had any place in it.

He began his term as ambassador by arranging the donation of an elaborate organ-clock commissioned by Queen Elizabeth I and built by organ-maker Thomas Dallam. The gift was intended to outshine overtures being made to the Sultan by Germany, France and other European nations in pursuit of trading rights in Ottoman territory. He was among the ambassadors who negotiated with the princes of Moldavia to gain trading privileges for English merchants.

He was on good terms with Giovan Battista Nani's brother, Agostino Nani, the Venetian ambassador, during a time when English pirates in the Levant disturbed the activities of the French and Venetian shipping companies. In 1598, he assisted in the negotiations between the Sultan and Rudolf II, Holy Roman Emperor of the House of Habsburg.

== Later career ==
Map of Constantinople, c. 1600

Sultan Mehmed III requested Lello to write to Prince Michael the Brave, starting negotiations and advising him to send a tribute, hoping to start an era of peace with the Habsburgs. He was then sent to meet the prince, and to gather and communicate informations for the Emperor. Prince Michael, born in 1558, was the ruler of Transylvania, and the successor to Wallachia, a territory previously ruled by Vlad Dracula until his death in 1477.

At the time, the roads in these territories were dangerous for the merchants, as they were permanent fights between the Ottomans and Romanians. But with the recent victories on the battlefield by Prince Michael the Brave, the English became afraid of losing influence in the region, which would have changed the tax advantages they had been granted by the Ottomans for the commercial roads to India.

Lello had been previously involved with prince Stephen the Great, whom he had helped gaining the throne of Moldavia with Queen Elizabeth Tudor, before being put in jail by the Ottomans. Toward the end of Lello's tenure, King James I of England replaced Elizabeth I and his views on Anglo-Ottoman diplomatic relations were different, not having much of an interest in securing peace between the Habsburgs and the Sultan. The relations were also aggravated by the English pirates in the Mediterranean.

He would stay the English ambassador for 10 years, with the main contacts being with the French and Venetian ambassadors, such as Venetian Francesco Contarini of the Contarini family, later Doge of Venice. Others included Nicolò Molin of Palazzo Molin del Cuoridoro and Zorzi Giustinian, whom he met in Venice. He left Constantinople on 24 May 1607 and was knighted by King James I.

Lello was also a member of the Levant Company, and made a fortune trading with the Levant and East India Company, from Constantinople to Venice. His nephew was Governor Edward Hopkins of Connecticut, who married Anne Yale, aunt of Elihu Yale of Yale University, and granddaughter of Chancellor David Yale.

Diplomatic posts
Preceded by Sir Edward Barton	Ambassador to the Ottoman Empire; 1597 – 24 May 1607	Succeeded by Sir Thomas Glover

== See also ==
- List of Ambassadors from the United Kingdom to the Ottoman Empire
