= Mundham =

- Village and Civil Parish
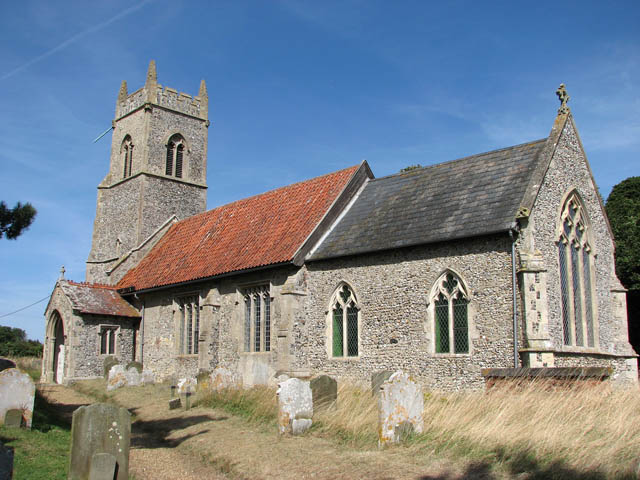
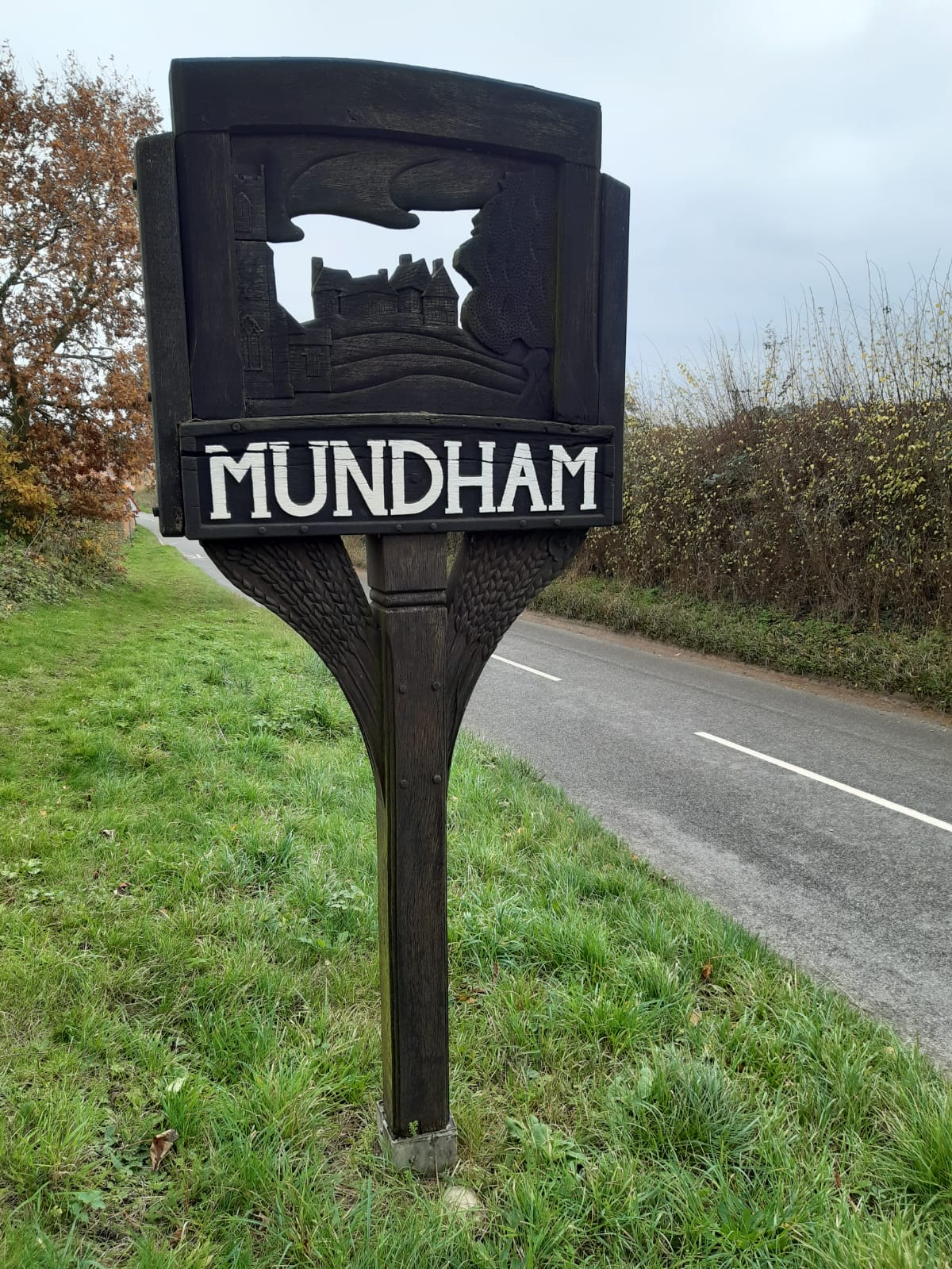
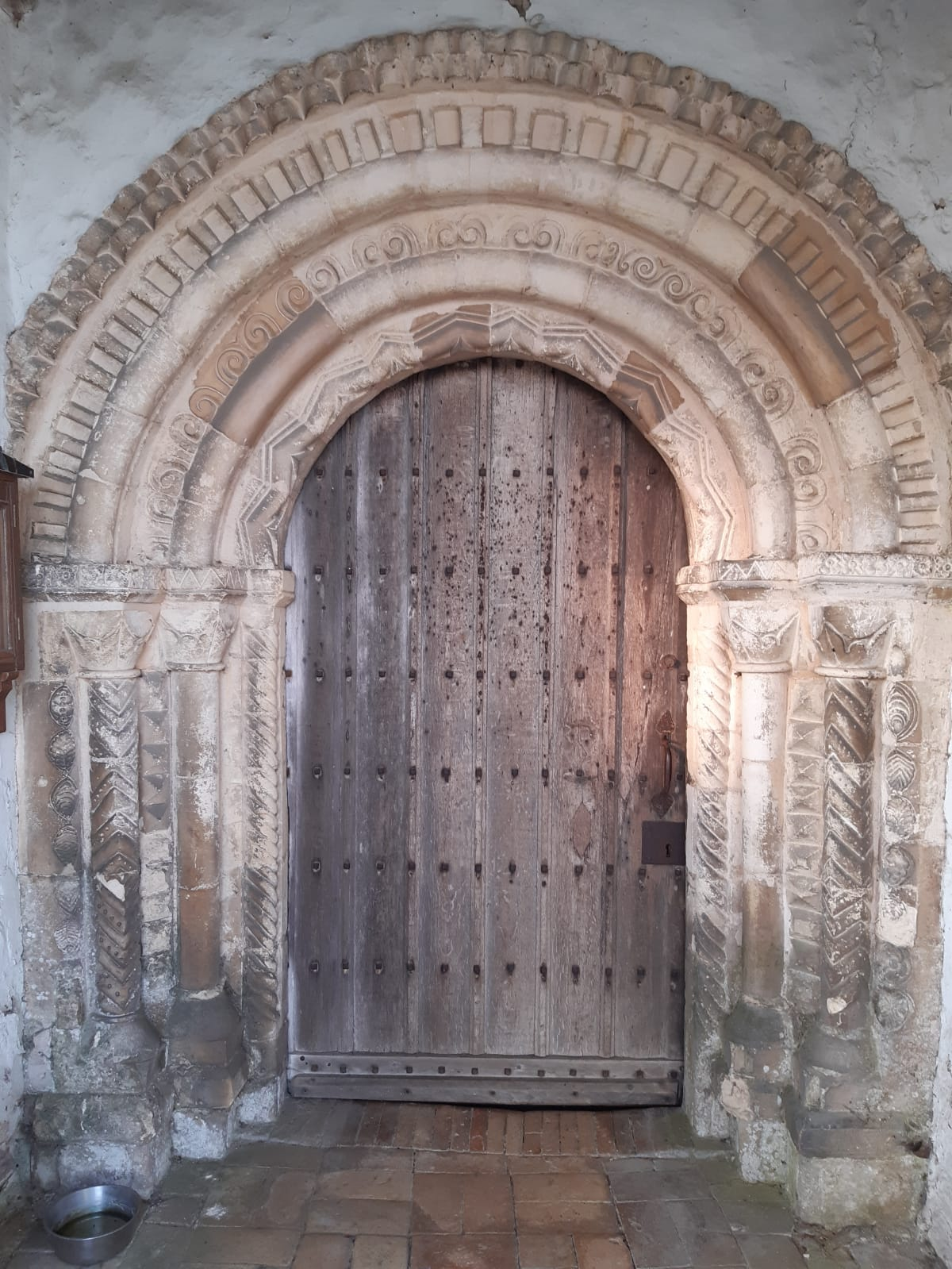
- Clockwise from top: St Peter's Church, St Peter's Norman doorway, and the Mundham village sign

- Location within Norfolk Location within England Location within the United Kingdom
- Coordinates: 52.528°N 1.441°E
- OS Grid Reference: TM335978
- Sovereign State: United Kingdom
- Country: England
- Region: East of England
- County: Norfolk
- District: South Norfolk
- Ward: Loddon
- Civil Parish: Mundham
- Founded: c.130 AD in the Pax Romana
- Split into Magna & Parva: Before 1224
- Reunification: 1454

Government
  - Type: Parish Council
  - Body: Mundham Parish Council

Area
  - Total: 2.44 sq mi (6.31 km^{2})
- Elevation: 98 ft (30 m)
- Highest elevation: 135 ft (41 m)
- Lowest elevation: 52 ft (16 m)

Population (2021)
  - Total: 147 ▼ (−16.95%)
  - Density: 60.3/sq mi (23.3/km^{2})
  - Ethnicity (2021 census): 100% White
  - Religion (2021 census): 63% Christian: 35.5% No Religion; 0.68% Buddhist; 0.68% Sikh
- Time zone: UTC+0 (GMT)
  - Summer (DST): UTC+1 (BST)
- Post Town: NORWICH
- Postcode District: NR14
- ONS: E00136704
- ITL: UKH17
- Police: Norfolk Constabulary
- Fire and Rescue: East of England
- Ambulance: East of England
- UK Parliament: South Norfolk
- Website: mundhamparishcouncilweb.wordpress.com

Mundham, historically Mundaham or Mundhala, is a small village and civil parish in the county of Norfolk, England. Archaeological and toponymic evidence of Mundham's existence predates its appearance in the Domesday Book survey of 1086, dating back to c.130 AD in the late Pax Romana period, however, it was not called Mundham until sometime between the 5th and 7th centuries, although there has been consistent activity in the area since the early Neolithic period. In the 2011 census, the population was 177 in 64 households, however in the 2021 census, the population had dropped to 147, in 67 households. The parish covers an area of 6.31 km^{2} (2.44 sq mi), and is approximately 9.1 miles (14.6 km) southeast of Norwich and 13.5 miles (21.7 km) west of Great Yarmouth.

For the purposes of local government, it falls within the district of South Norfolk, however Mundham does have a parish council responsible for local matters laid down by law, including a role in local planning, it consists of five councillors, and a clerk. The village contains a number of heritage-listed buildings, which include a 12th-century church, multiple farmhouses, and the ruins of a 13th-century church. The fields and woodland surrounding Mundham have changed little in the past 500 years, and the village itself remains rural with a low population density compared to the national average.

Mundham is located in the electoral district of Loddon, which is part of the South Norfolk district of the county of Norfolk, England. Near the centre of Mundham, there is a small stream which flows into the River Chet. Mundham borders the River Chet to the north, between Mundham and Bergh Apton, and is located 11 miles southeast of Norwich. In the west, it borders Seething, while in the northeast, it borders Sisland. In the southeast the extensions of Loddon reach. In the south Mundham borders Thwaite, and in the southwest it borders with Hedenham. The village sign is located near St Peter's Church, and depicts a series of houses in the foreground, with St Peter's church and the millennium oak in the background, the sign's supports are carved into a sheath of wheat, with a small mouse and a poppy hidden within them.

== Toponymy ==
The name Mundham originates from the pre-7th century word Mund, which is the nominative plural of the Old English word munda, meaning "protector", "guardian" or "hand", or the Old Saxon noun mund, meaning "hand", both of which come from the Proto-Germanic mundō, which itself comes from the Proto-Indo-European word *mh₂-nt-éh₂, which means "the beckoning one". The suffix -ham is the Old English noun meaning "homestead, village, manor or estate," which comes from the Proto-West Germanic haim, meaning "home". The suffix -hamm is the Old English for "enclosure", "land hemmed by water or marsh or higher ground", "land in a riverbend", "rivermeadow" or "promontory", which comes from the Proto-West Germanic verb hammjan, meaning "to pinch", "to hem" or "to enclose". Both -hamm and -ham appear as -ham in modern place names.

== History ==
Mundham was founded nearly two millennia ago, in the late Pax Romana period, with the earliest Roman evidence dating from the reign of Hadrian, however, the name of Mundham dates from the early Anglo Saxon period, in the Kingdom of East Anglia, during the Heptarchy, in the 5th to 7th century AD. St Peter's Church and Mundham Hall were built between then and 1086, as they appear Mundham's entry in the Domesday Book. In the 12th/13th century, Mundham was split into Mundham St Peter's (Mundham Magna) and Mundham St Ethelbert's (Mundham Parva), and St Ethelbert's Church was built for use by Mundham Parva, until 1454 when Mundham reunified, despite this St Ethelbert's stayed open until 1749. In the 12th century, the current iteration of St Peter's was built. Throughout the 19th century, the major landowners of Mundham were usually the owner of Mundham house, which was built sometime prior to 1845, and the lord of the manor in Dickleburgh-Manclere. Across from the Church, Roman coins and other artefacts have been found, dating from 130 AD until the end of the Roman Empire's occupation of Britannia in 410 AD.

=== Early history ===
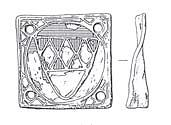
An unusual mount plate from the mediaeval period

Mundham was founded as a settlement in the late Pax Romana period, built on the sandy soil of the river Chet, however there has been activity here since the earliest period of human settlement in Norfolk. Mesolithic blades, and burnt and worked flints as well as Neolithic flints have been found in nearby fields, as have flint and bronze axes, scrapers and many other objects.

A number of early Neolithic pits have been discovered, one of which contained burnt wood and debris and a human cremation, other nearby pits have been dated to the Bronze Age, and a ditch and another two pits have been dated to the Iron Age. Evidence of the Bronze Age appears in a number of ring ditches, enclosures and linear crop marks. Objects found include arrowheads, assorted metal tools and pottery sherds. Iron Age artefacts were found, along with postholes, ditches and pits. Objects from the period include coins, jewellery and pottery.

There is evidence of a Roman settlement, as Roman bricks and tiles, as well as many sherds of Roman pottery have been found, as have personal items such as brooches and cosmetic tools, and coins.

There are remnants of the Norse occupation of East Anglia found in Mundham, such as a silver clasp button which was discovered in the 1980s, it is unparalleled in its design in England, being similar to other buttons from the island of Helgö, which was known to make such items, however its metallurgical properties are similar to other norse silverwork which were made in England, in which case, it may be a copy of a Swedish artefact prototype.

Although the first record of Mundham and St Peter's Church is in the original Domesday Book, Mundham, as indicated by its archaeology and toponymy, was established here in the early Roman Empire, c.130, however it was named Mundham sometime between the 5th and 7th century AD, as shown by toponymic evidence, and also as the remains of sunken-featured buildings, or Pit-houses have been excavated, and an Early Saxon inhumation cemetery as well as a Middle Saxon posthole. In 1086, Mundham had a population of 76.3 households and had its land split between 13 different owners, giving it an estimated population of 381, putting it in the top 20% of settlements listed in the Domesday Book. In the Domesday Book, it is listed as:

"Mundaham / Mundhala:
King's land, in the custody of Godric; also in the charge of William de Noyers; Thorold, Ulfketel and Robert de Vaux from Roger Bigot; Jocelyn from St Edmund's; Nigel and Ansger from Robert FitzCorbucion; Isaac; Roger FitzRainard; Ralph FitzHagni. ½ church. Horse at the hall." [sic]

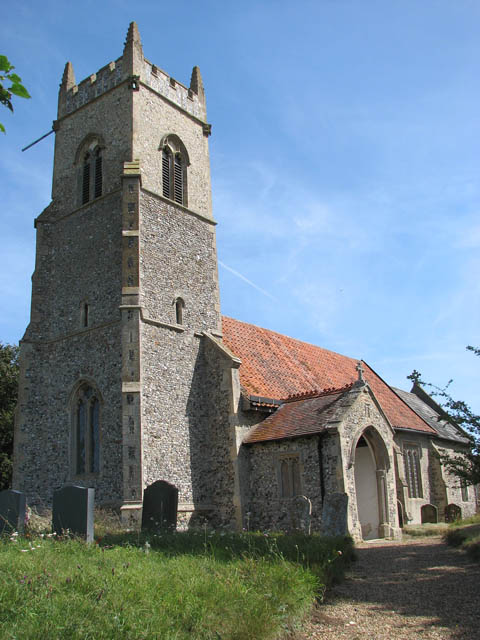
St Peter's church, Tower and Porch

This is also the first mention of St Peter's Church and Mundham Hall, originally St Peter's Church would have been owned and run by the Hall, as the concept of a parish church arrived with the Normans.

=== Middle Ages to early modern period ===
Unfortunately during this period, Mundham is relatively poorly recorded, however some evidence comes from archaeological finds and church records. St Peter's Church is the oldest building in Mundham, having been first built before the Domesday Book was written, as it has Anglo-Saxon foundations. It also has a beautiful example of a carved Norman doorway. The nave of the church dates from the 12th century, and the 15th-century bell-tower contains the remains of a relatively plain, Norman Purbeck marble font, which was lost from the 1850s to the 1920s, when it was found in a pond in Seething.

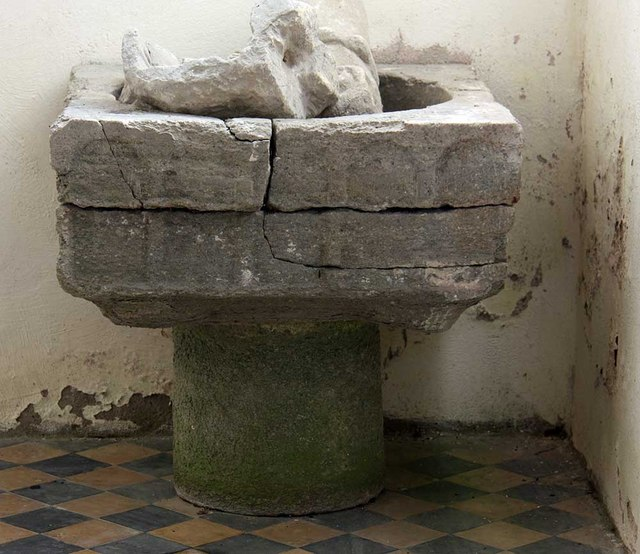
Norman Purbeck marble font

Sometime after the Domesday Book was written, and sometime before 1224, Mundham was split into two different villages, Mundham St Peter's (or Mundham Magna) and Mundham St Ethelbert's (or Mundham Parva), the split was marked by the building of a second church, St Ethelbert's, for use by Mundham Parva. St Ethelbert's wasn't well recorded until the late 13th century, and its rectors date from 1305 until 1454, when Mundham was reunited into one village, although St Ethelbert's continued to operate until its closure in 1749.

In 1430, the manor of Mundham was bought by Sir John Fastolf, the prototype for Shakespeare's Falstaff, before he sold it again in 1451 to Hugh Acton, who was the master of St Giles Hospital, Norwich, they continued to hold the manor here for over three hundred years.

Mundham has a Poor Lands charity which provides a small amount of money to elderly residents of the village using the rent from a plot of land which it owns, the land was left in 1680 by Thomas Spooner and an unknown donor, which brought in 20 shillings and 10 shillings of yearly rent charges in 1845 respectively. St Peter's Church records date from dates from 1559, the churches of Mundham and Seething have been joined since the 15th century, before they merged with Thwaite, Brooke and Kirstead, forming a group, before being fully joined as a benefice, by order of the council, in 1881.

=== Late modern period ===
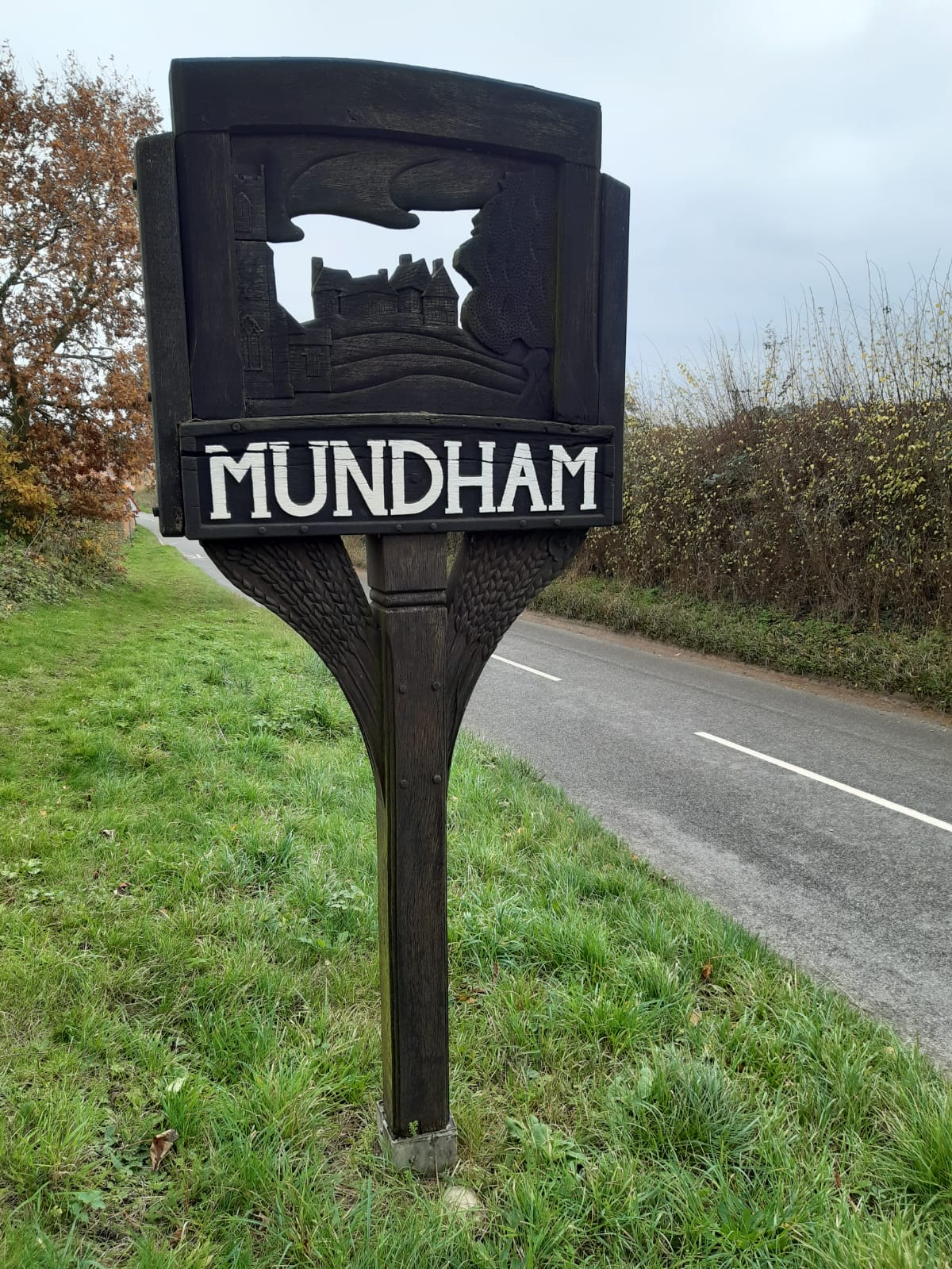
Mundham village sign

Throughout the 18th and 19th centuries, Mundham grew significantly through the Industrial Revolution, with the population peaking in 1831 at 314, Mundham also acquired a general store, a butchers shop, a post-mill, and three Chapels in this period. St Peter's church underwent considerable growth during this time, as it was refurbished and had the vestry and northern aisle added, giving an extra 50 seats, also, a new faux-Romanesque font was added, replacing the old Norman font which was then lost for almost a century. Sometime around 1750, Mundham house was constructed as a typical Georgian Manor house, and it possesses many interesting Neoclassical features. In 1881, Mundham, Seething, Thwaite, Brooke and Kirstead formed the Brooke Benefice, fully uniting them as one permanent church appointment.

Throughout the late modern period the major landowners of Mundham changed constantly, in the mid 19th century, G. S. Kett, whom was lord of the manor in Dickleburgh-Manclere, Jonathan Farrow, esquire, the owner of Mundham House, and Edward Clarke, esquire, were the major landowners. However in the 1880s, Henry Manners-Sutton, 4th Viscount Canterbury, who lived in Dickleburgh-Manclere, was the major landowner in Mundham, but by the late 19th century, the major landowner was Mr Hy. E. Garrod, however, Edward Clarke and his son, Henry, still owned a large area of land in Mundham, and Arthur E. Powell, esq, now owned Mundham house. By this time, Mundham was officially located in the Brooke polling district.

Up until 1879 the vicar of the Brooke group, and therefore the vicar of St Peter's Church was J. T. Burt, he lived in a rectorial manor which belonged to the Great Hospital in Norwich, which also held a large area of land and the advowson, the ability to present a nominee for the position of vicar, in Mundham, he was then replaced by Charles Hocking Hicks, whom was vicar until 1930.

== Landmarks ==
Mundham's buildings display a wide range of architectural styles, from modern red brick houses, Georgian manors, and Tudor farm houses. Most of Mundham was built in the 20th century, although the farms are mostly all far older, many of which are among the 13 listed buildings in Mundham.

=== Mundham St Peter's ===
When Mundham was two separate villages, Mundham St Peter's, or Mundham Magna (Mundham Greater), was the smaller, denser, northern part of Mundham and existed until the reunification in 1454. St Peter's Church, the ruins of St Ethelbert's Church, Mundham House, and the site of Mundham Hall, are all located within Mundham St Peter's. It was originally known as Mundham Magna, but was called Mundham St Peter's in more recent writings.

==== St Peter's Church ====
Located in the west of Mundham, on Loddon road, St Peter's Church is a grade I listed church, which was originally built in the 7th century AD, as a wooden, Saxon church, and while none of the Saxon church remains, the foundations are still Saxon. There has been a church on the site for over a millennium, and it was first recorded in the Domesday Book. Originally, St Peter's was a Catholic church, as it predates the English Reformation by about 900 years, however after the reformation, St Peter's Church became an Anglican church. Most of the internals of the church are 15th century wood carvings, and remain into the current age. St Peter's Churchyard contains graves dating from the late 18th century up to the current day.

===== History =====
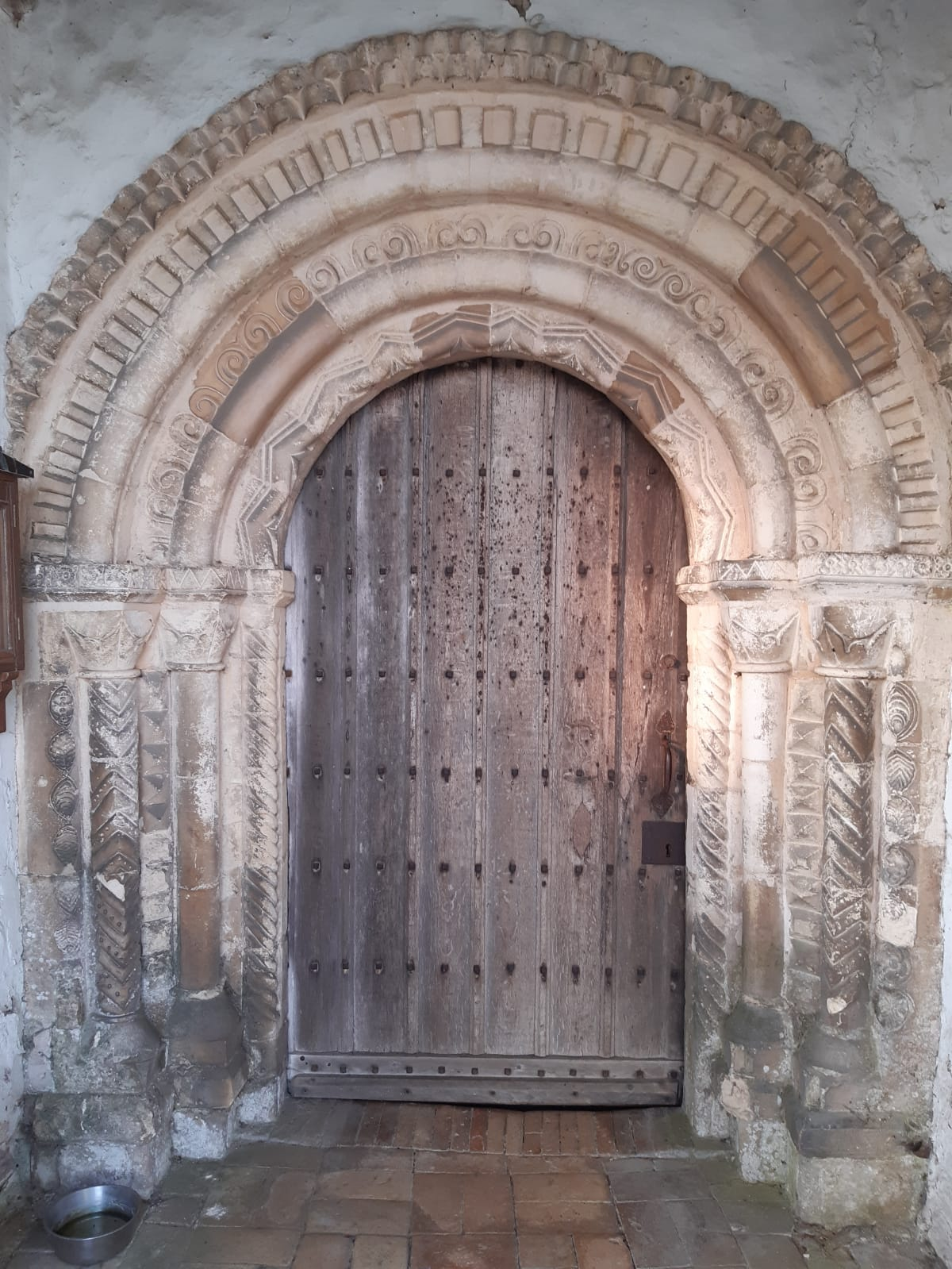
The carved Norman doorway

====== Earlier buildings ======
Mundham was first created in c.130 AD, in Roman Britain, and although Britain was Christian between c.350 AD and 410, there is no evidence of a Roman church located anywhere in Mundham. After the Roman Empire left Britain in 410 AD, Christianity was lost in Norfolk until it reached England again in 597 AD, and soon after, in the 7th century, St Peter's church was built, acting as the personal chapel of Mundham Hall, as during Anglo-Saxon England a church was owned by the local hall, rather than by the parish, as the idea of a parish church arrived with the Normans. All that remains of the Saxon church is its foundations, as most churches of that period were wooden buildings.

====== Norman church ======
St Peter's church's first written record was in the Domesday Book in 1086, when it was strangely recorded as a half church. During Norman England, in the early 12th century, the previous Saxon church was replaced with the Norman nave which exists to this day. The main doorway of St Peter's church is built in a Romanesque or early Norman style, and it was carved by the same master Stonemason as both Ashby St Mary's St Mary, and Heckingham's St Gregory, as all have the same signature style.

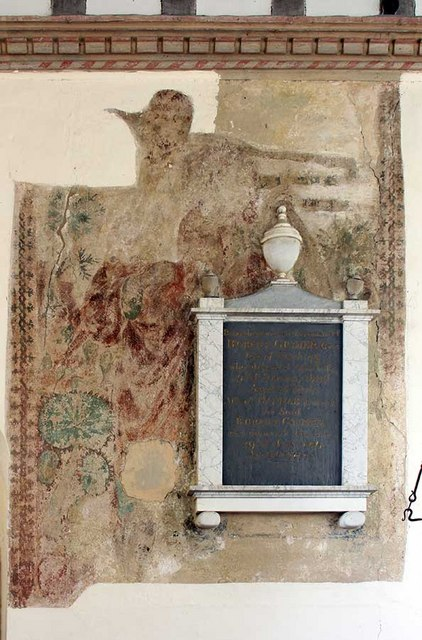
The painting of St Christopher on the north wall

====== Later history ======
The Chancel was added to the church in the early 14th century, as soon after that, the Black death broke out, and therefore additions to the church would have been very unlikely to have taken place. During the 15th century, the church underwent a large change, with the construction of the bell tower, along with the majority of the internal dressings of the church, such as the pews, the rood screen, and the walls were painted with Catholic imagery. After the English reformation in 1534, when England changed from a Catholic country into an Anglican one, due to this, the paintings of saints on the walls were whitewashed, and other such Catholic dressings were removed, the walls remained covered for almost 400 years, and the majority of which remain covered, all but the Saint Christopher on the north wall. Due to damage to the building, and the expense of repair, St Ethelbert's church was closed in 1749, and with the building quickly becoming derelict, the Sanctus bell was taken from the Gable of the church, and moved into St Peter's bell tower.

In 1863, an extra aisle was added to the northern side of the nave, adding 50 extra seats, and would eventually give a place for the church organ. In 1877, a vestry was added for the Golden Jubilee of Queen Victoria, as well as a new font in the form of a faux-romanesque one, this replaced the old Norman Purbeck marble font which was lost around that time, before eventually being found in a pond in the nearby village of Seething nearly 50 years later. In the early 20th century, a survey of the interior of the church found the 15th century wall painting of Saint Christopher, and was subsequently uncovered soon after. As well as that, in 1930, a Tudor wafer oven, a recess for the hanging of banners, and a consecration cross were found in of the walls of the bell tower. The stained glass St Peter's Keys on the main window was added in 1953 to celebrate the coronation of Queen Elizabeth II. The pulpit used to be on the right side of the rood screen, however it was removed in 1962 for safety reasons. In 1968, the ancient building was finally installed with electric lighting and heating.

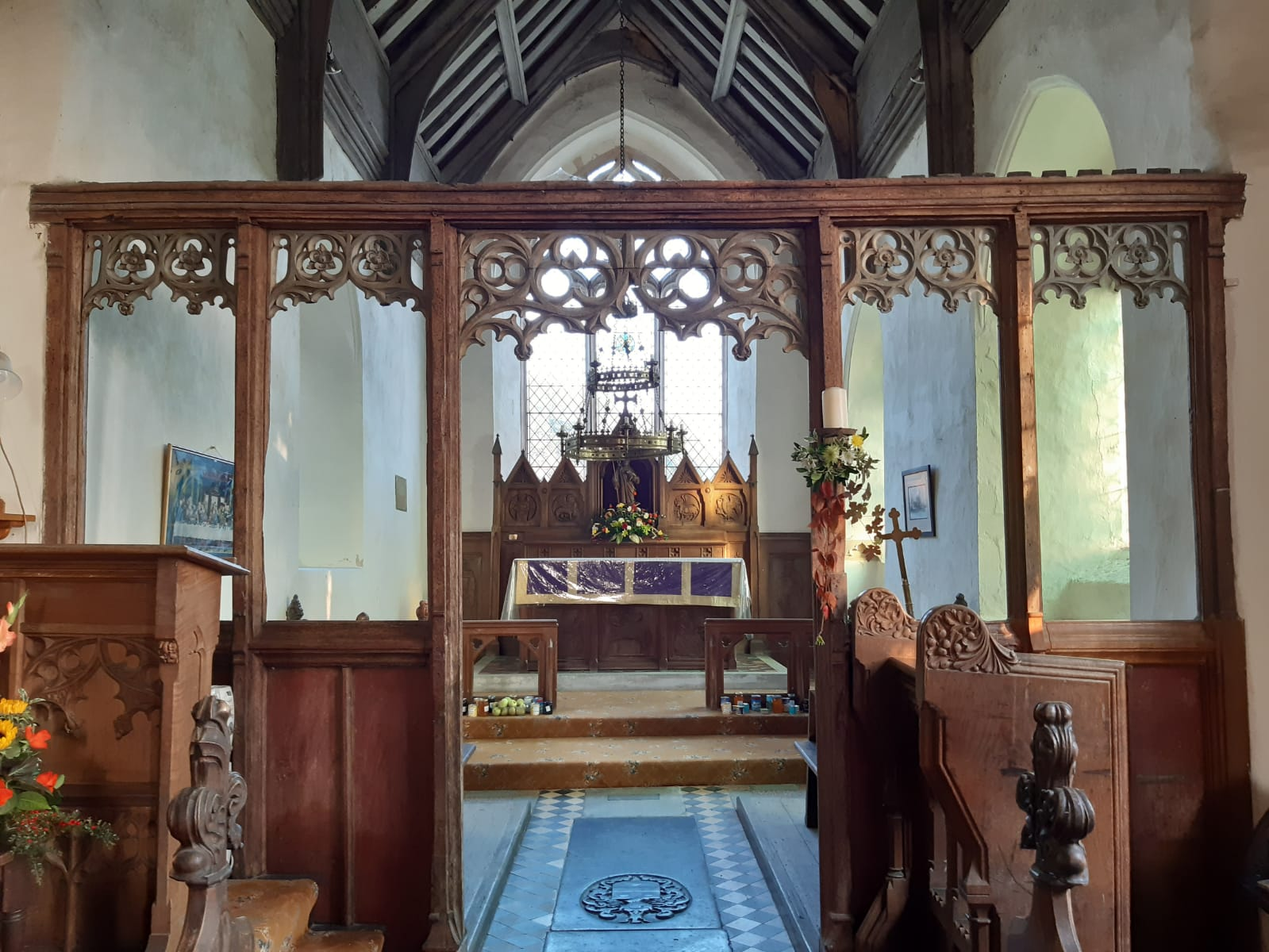
The 15th century rood screen

===== Architecture =====
The nave of St Peter's church is a long, narrow Norman build, which dates from the early 12th century, it was built with a rare, early example of Scissor beams, and, as with many other churches in Norfolk, the walls are painted with saints and other Catholic imagery, unfortunately these were all painted over during the English Reformation, however a 15th-century mural depicting Saint Christopher was uncovered, and although a large section is covered by a memorial from 1797, his head and body, the floral border, and a prayer scroll which contains an invitation to pray before the image are revealed. The nave has two Norman doorways, the more elaborate of which is the main entrance to the church, it has three well-carved members, and elaborate scrolls, leaves, and rolls. The other doorway, which is far more plain, is located directly across from the entrance, and while it was once another entrance to the church, it now leads into a vestry. Just inside the door on the right is the Holy Water Stoup, and on the south wall there are two Tudor windows, which have carved heads on the outside of the church.

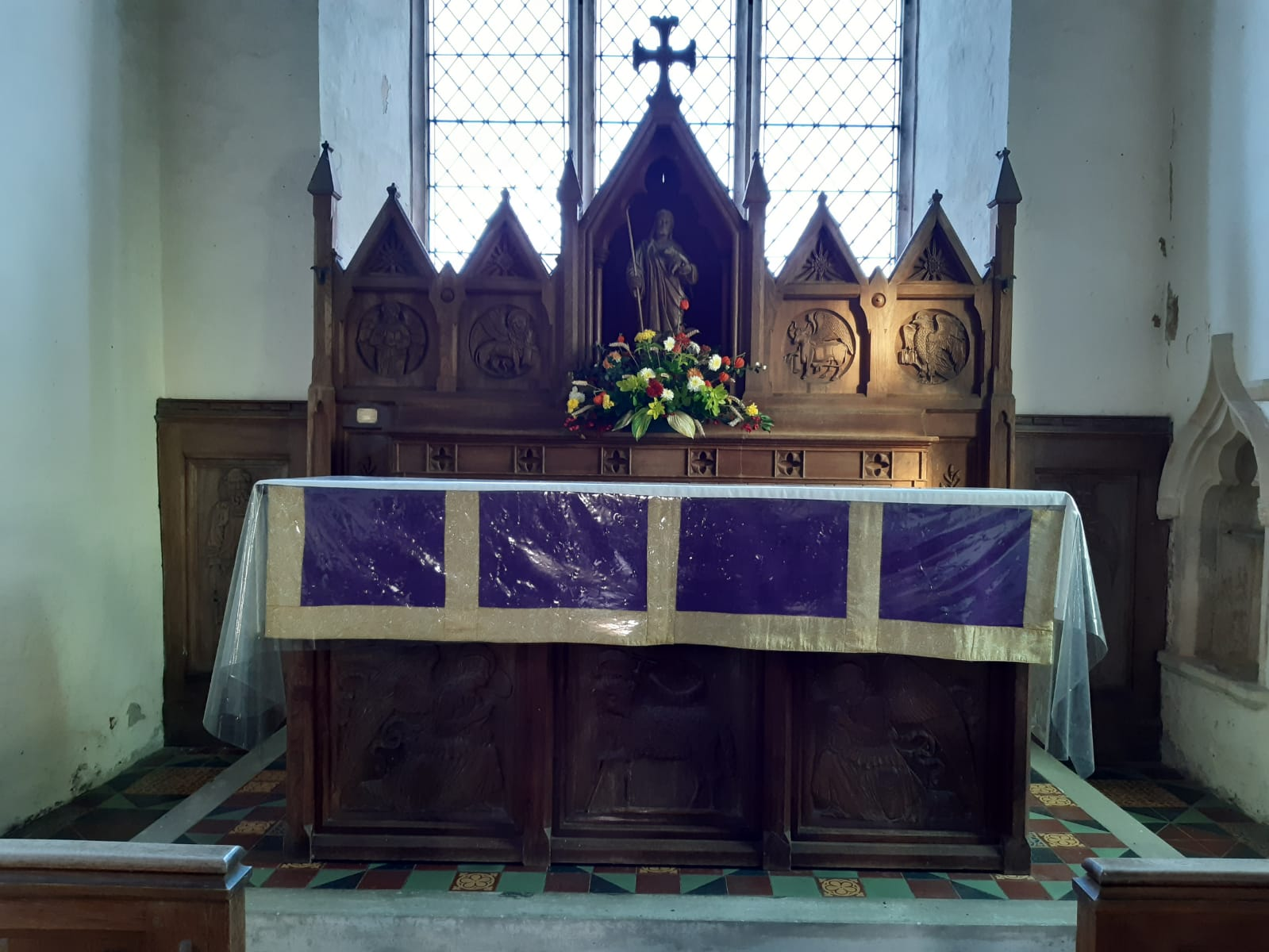
The Redoras, carved in 1908

The 15th-century, wooden rood screen is used to separate the people's church from the chancel, and is decorated with carved cherub's heads, the screen was once painted red and white, but has since lost its colour. The 15th-century pews have carved poppy heads on their ends. On the right of the screen is an hourglass holder, which was used to time the priests sermons, and nearby to that is a recess which marks the way up where the rood loft once was.

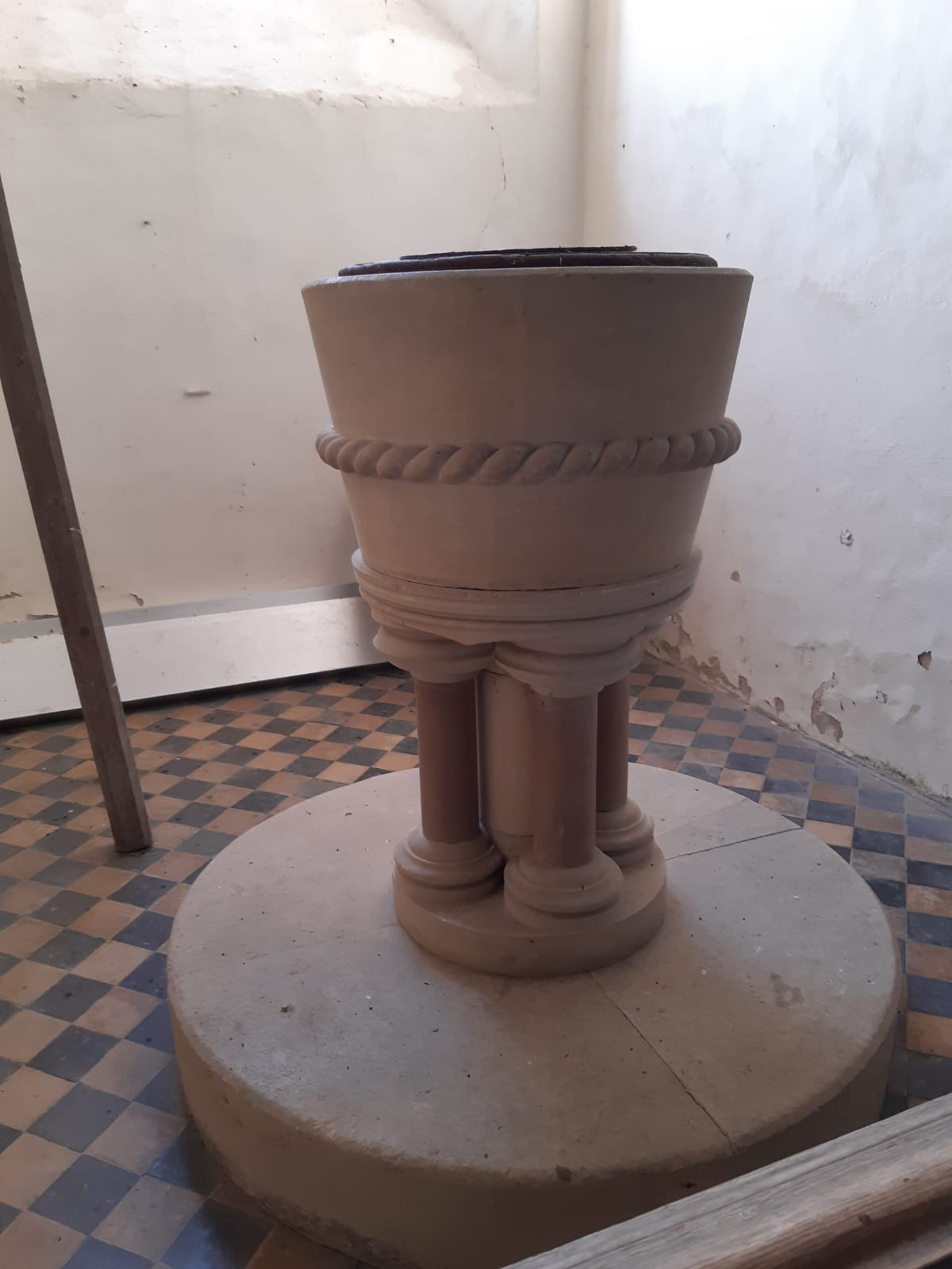
Faux-romanesque Victorian Font

The Reredos was added in 1908, having been donated by the rev. Charles Hicks and his wife, and was designed as a miniature version of the one from Notre-Dame Cathedral in Paris. The chancel has three plain windows, which have the names of the glaziers scratched into them. The only stained glass in the church is on the main window is at the far end of the church, it is a cartouche of Saint Peter's Keys. Under the main window, the floor has been raised in order to place the altar higher for the congregation, which makes the 15th-century Piscina (which is contained in a canopied recess) and Sedilia relatively close to the floor. The mediaeval credence shelf is rare, as it was built with notches to hold the chalice upside-down while it drains.

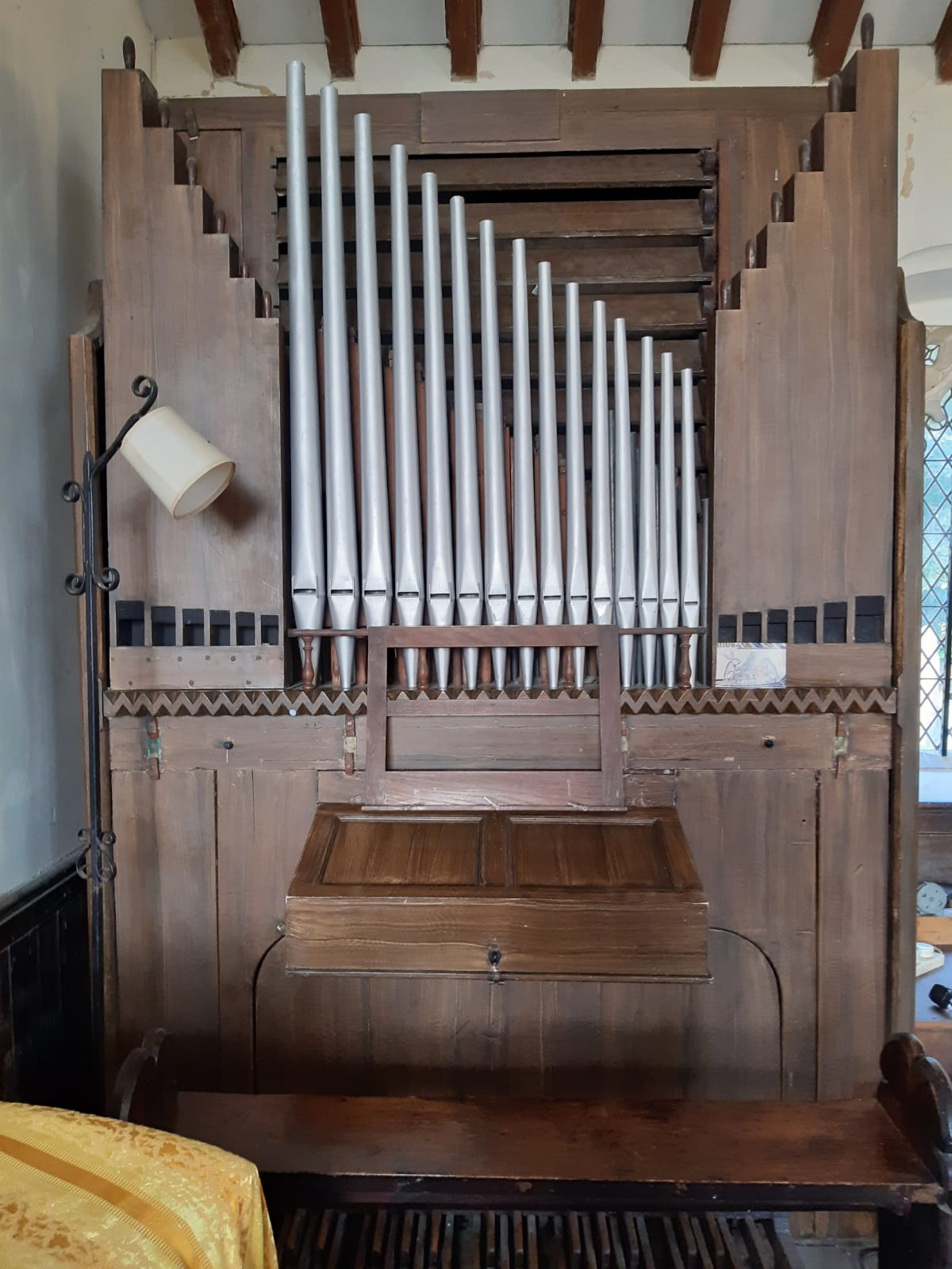
The small, Victorian Organ

The northern aisle holds the church's small, victorian Organ, gives 50 additional seats, and on the east wall is a framed brass rubbing of the memorial to William Harborne, whom was the first English Ambassador to Constantinople.

The bell tower was added in the 15th century, and has three stages, with a battlemented parapet, turreted corners and gargoyles to throw rainwater clear of the walls. The roof is tiled with pantiles and slates, however it was originally thatched. The arcading of flint on the battlements has the remains of the lettering "St Petrus", meaning "Saint Peter" in Latin. It contains three bells; the Sanctus bell, and a pair of Angelus bells, which are also called 'the Gabriel bells'. The Church font, is built in a Victorian faux-Romanesque style, and is located in the centre of the bell tower. The original 13th-century, Norman Purbeck marble font is depicted in a Cotman engraving, a copy of which is kept in the church. Including the fonts, a rare Tudor fireplace/wafer oven, one of only half a dozen left in Norfolk, is located in a recess of the tower, opposite which is a recess for banners. Just outside of the tower is a 14th-century Consecration cross on the wall. The church also contains a rare example of the Royal Arms for George II from 1743.

===== Music =====
St Peter's bell tower contains three bells, all three of which date prior to 1553, the smallest of the three is the Sanctus bell, this came from St Ethelbert's church when it closed in 1749. It has a very rare "narrow-waisted" design, and is inscribed in latin as:

"Ave Maria, Gracia Plena, Dominus Tecum" meaning "Hail Mary, full of grace, the Lord be with you" [sic]

The other two bells are a pair of Angelus bells, which are also known as 'the Gabriel bells'. These have been in St Peter's church since the bell tower was built in the 15th century, and each have a latin inscription. On the top of each bell is three small shields, and the monogram "RB" is repeated multiple times. Although the inscriptions appear to be largely nonsense, they read as follows:

"Hac In Conclave Gabriel. Nūc Pange Sauve." meaning "Save Gabriel in this room" [sic]

"Dulcis Cisto Melis. Campana Vocor Michis." meaning "I call the sweet honey box bell for you" [sic]

A more logical form of the second inscription has "Cisto" replaced with "Cista", "Melis" replaced with "Mellis", and "Michis" being a shortened version of "Michaelis", thus meaning the inscription would read as:

"Dulcis Cista Mellis. Campana Vocor Michaelis." "Box of sweet honey, I am called Michael’s bell" [sic]

St Peter's church organ is located in the northern aisle, and was built in 1877 by William Hill & Son, one of the main organ builders of the 19th century. It is quite a small organ, however, uniquely for such a small instrument, the organ has two full-sized keyboards, as well as a full pedalboard.

===== Memorials and notable people =====
As is typical for such an ancient church, St Peter's Church contains many memorials to those who have contributed significantly to the church, the village, and even the country as a whole.

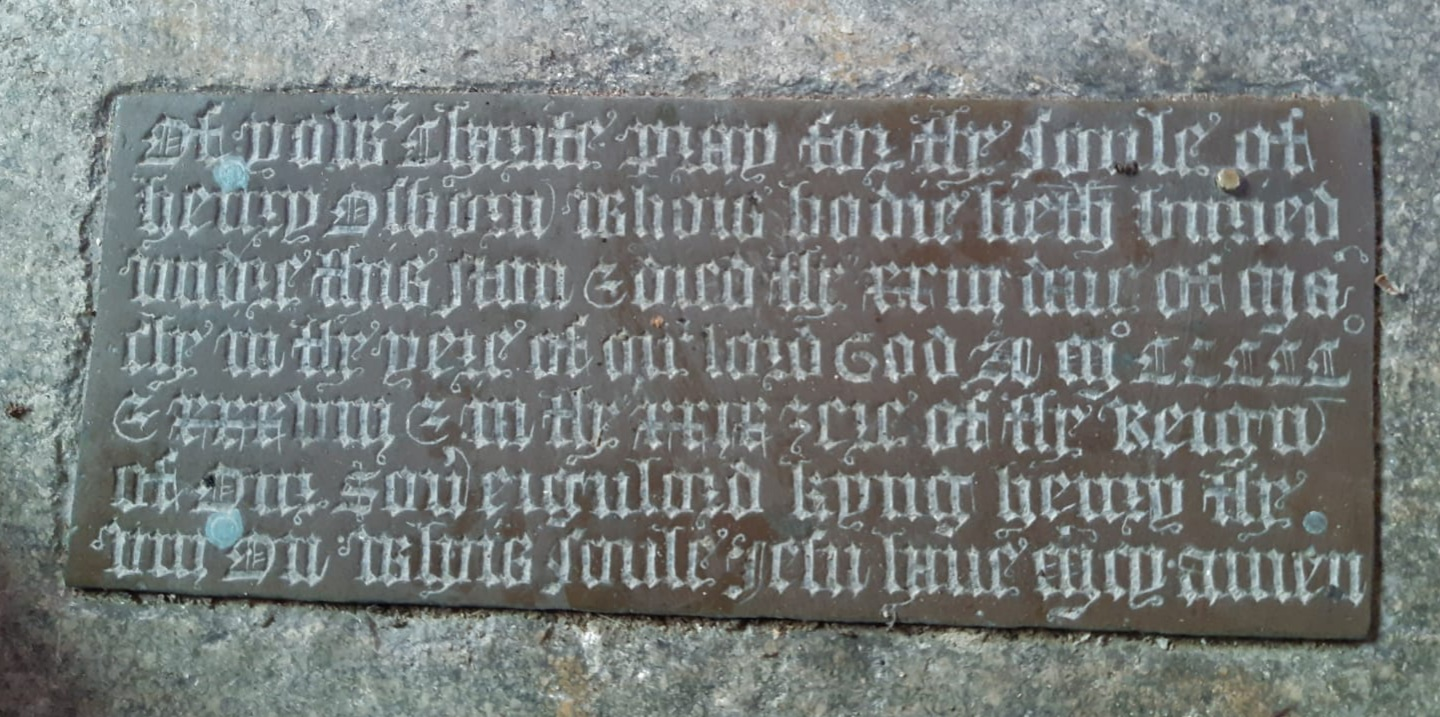
Henry Osborn's memorial plaque, placed in 1538

====== Henry Osborn ======
The oldest memorial in the church is dedicated to Henry Osborn, this small metal floor plaque dates from 1538, and is situated at the head of the Chancel. It is written in a mediaeval cursive style, and is particularly difficult to read. The entire plaque is transcribed below:

"Of your charitie pray for the soule of Henry Osborn whois bodie lieth buried under this ston / died in the XXIX yeir of our sovreign lord kyng Henry the VIII on whose soule Jesu have mercy amen." [sic]

King Henry VIII was crowned in 1509, and this was recorded as the 29th year of his reign, making the year 1538. This is one of the very last examples of the use of prayer clauses in a memorial inscription in Norfolk, because shortly after prayers for the dead became illegal.

====== William Harborne ======
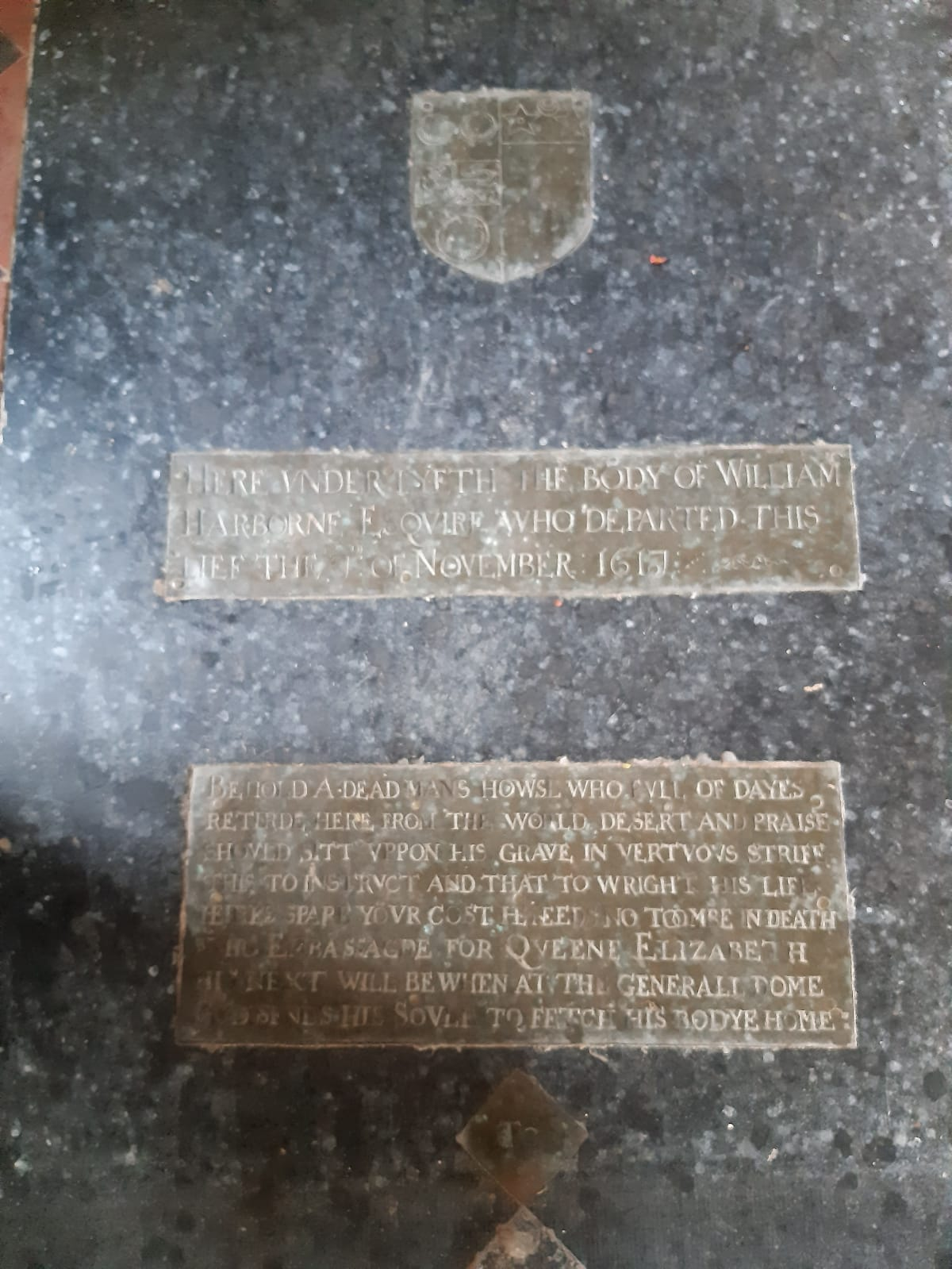
The floor plaque for William Harborne, placed in 1617

William Harborne was the first English ambassador to Constantinople from November 1582 until August 1588, leaving it as one of the most powerful positions in the English foreign service, when he retired to Mundham, living in Mundham Hall until his death on 6 September 1617 at the age of 72. A marble floor plaque was laid in his honour in St Peter's Church, and is engraved with his eulogy, which goes as follows:

"Behold a dead mans howse who full of dayes,
retirde here from the world desert and praise
should sitt uppon in vertuous strife,
this to instruct and that to wright his life.
Heires spare your cost, he needs no tombe in death,
who Embassagde for Queene Elizabeth,
his next will be when at the generall doome
God sends his soule to fetch his bodye home" [sic]

He also had a gravestone at St Ethelbert's church, but it has been lost along with the rest of the churchyard, the inscription of his grave read:

"Reader, the dust inclos'd beneath this pile,
A life unspotted liv'd; devoid of e'ery guile,
Plain in his manners, sincere to his friend,
A pattern of virtue with honesty combin'd,
Shewn thro' e'ery action while here on earth,
'Till unerring fate had stopt his breath." [sic]

Arms of Cooke Baronets of Broome Hall in Norfolk (Cooke of Linstead, Suffolk) Blazon: Or, a chevron engrailed gules between three cinquefoils azure on a chief of the second a lion passant argent

Harborne had a significant role in preventing the Ottoman Empire from supporting Catholic Spain in the war against Protestant England that was taking place at the time. Harborne was able to persuade the Porte that Spain was a threat to peace for all of Europe, and although he was unable to obtain a military alliance with the Ottoman empire, the Spanish-Ottoman protocol was not renewed in 1587, and the Elizabethan Treaty was renewed and would continue for another 343 years between England and the Ottoman Empire, until 1930. He also had a coat of arms, a red shield with three bezants around a gold Lion. (Blazon: Gules, a lion passant or between three bezants) William's daughter, Elizabeth, married Gregory Randall and had a daughter, also called Elizabeth, whom was born in 1629 and died in January 1652 at the age of 23. Her memorial in latin reads:

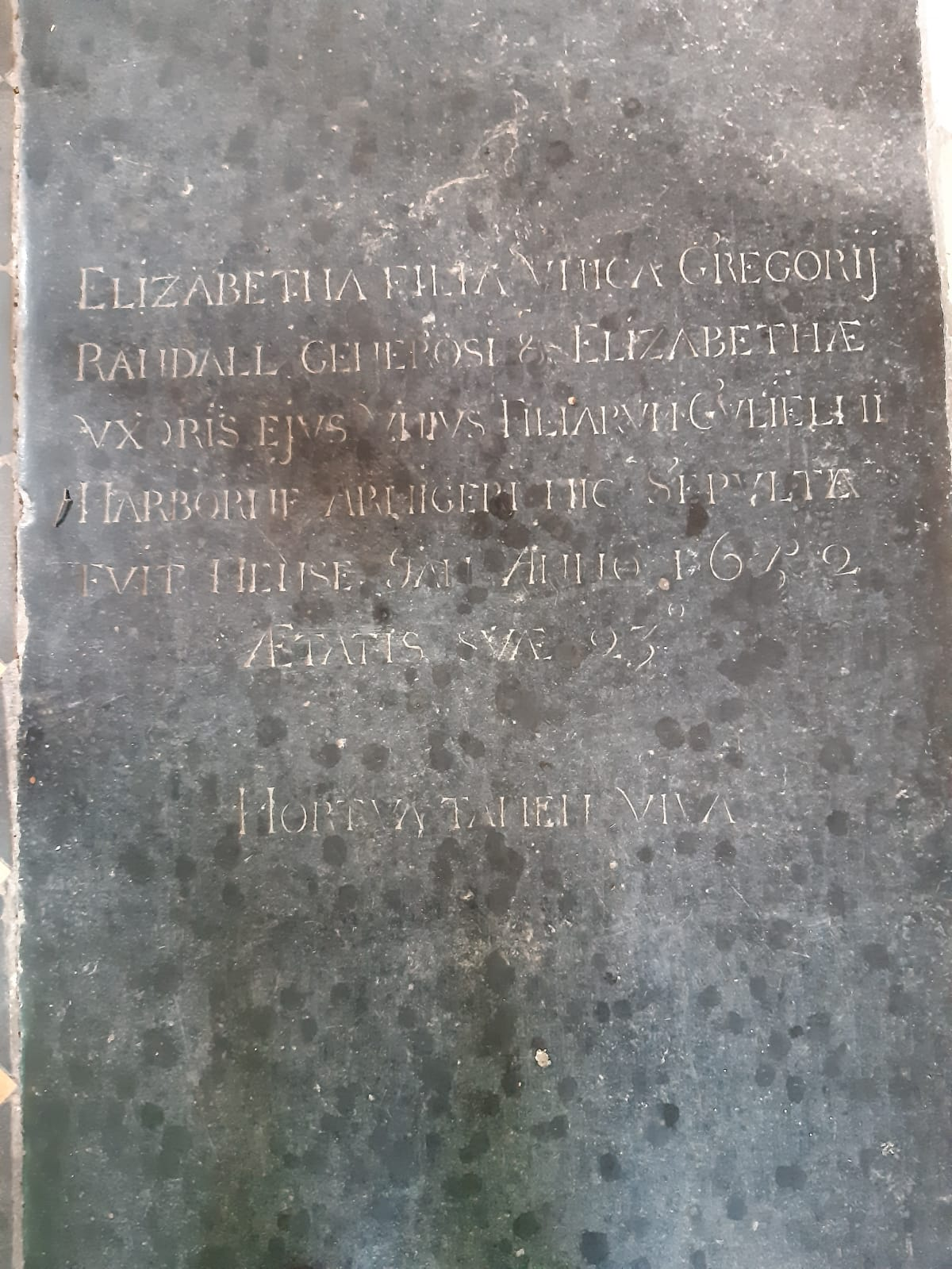
Elizabeth Randall's Floor Plaque

"Elizabethae filia unica Gregorij Randall Generosi & Elizabethae uxoris ejus unius filiarum gulielmi Harborne armigeri hic sepultae fuit hense Jan anno 1652, aetatis suae 23"

Which translated into English is:

"Elizabeth, the only daughter of Gregory Randall, noble, and Elizabeth, his wife, one of the daughters of William Harborne, esquire, was buried here Jan. 1652, at the age of 23"

Gregory's son, William, and his wife, Elizabeth (née Cooke) lost four daughters at birth, and laid a stone in their memory in August 1671. Their memorial in latin reads:

"Quatuor infantes filiolae gulielmi randall generosi & Elizabethae uxoris ejus unius filiarum gulielmi cookrade broome barronetti sunt hic sepultae, in quarum memoriam hunc lapidem posvit earum pater hense augusti 1671"

Which translated into English is:

"Four infant daughters of William Randall, noble, and Elizabeth his wife, one of the daughters of William Cooke, baronet of Broome, are buried here, in memory of which their father laid this stone in August 1671"

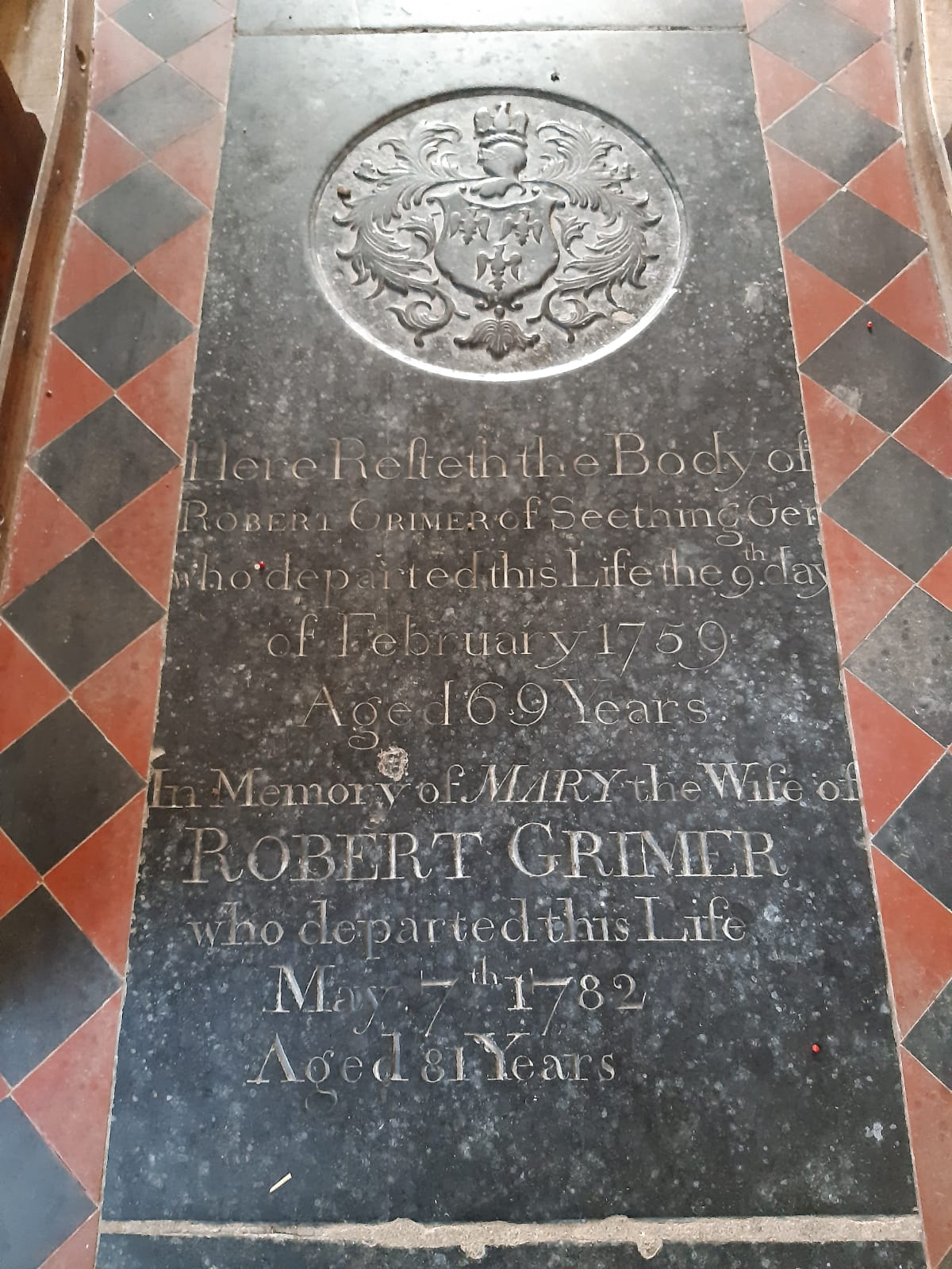
Robert Grimer's Floor Plaque, 1759

Elizabeth Randall's father was William Cooke, first Baronet of Broome hall, and her brother, Sir William Cooke, became the second and final Baronet of Broome hall.

Harborne/Randall family tree

Extended content

William Harborne | Anthony Drury
William Harborne (c. 1542–1617) | Elizabeth Harborne (?-1626) (née Drury)
William Stewart | Mary Greenwood (?-1686) | William Cooke (?-1681) | Mary Cooke (née Astley) | Anne Harborne | Gregory Randall | Elizabeth Randall (née Harborne) | John Harborne (1591-?) | ? | Thomas Ward (?-1632) | Anne Ward (née Pert)
Jane Steward (?-1698) | Sir William Cooke (c. 1630–1708) | Elizabeth Cooke (?-1671) | William Randall (?-1686) | Mary Randall | Elizabeth Randall (1629-1652) | Elizabeth Ward (née Harborne) | Sir Edward Ward (c. 1618-1684)
Four Infant Daughters (1671-1671) | Nicholas Randall | Mary Berry (née Randall)

====== The Grimer family ======
The Grimers lived in Mundham for over 250 years, from pre-16th century to the late 18th century, they were first recorded in 1523 when Robert Greymer was born, and last record when Robert Grimer was born in 1772. They were some of the major landowners of their time, and have three floor plaques and a wall plaque in St Peter's Church which is over the St Christopher's painting, one of which has their 'self assigned' coat of arms of three golden eagles on a green shield. (Blazon: Vert, three Eagles displayed with wings inverted Or)

Grimer family tree

Extended content

Robert Greymer (1523-?) | ?
William Grymer (1545-?) | ?
Ann Grymer | Prudence Grymer | Robert Grymer | ?
William Grymer (?-1634) | Elizabeth Thrower (?-1621)
Ann Grimer (1601-?) | Robert Grimer (1608-?) | Ann Neale
Robert Grimer (1637-1680) | Ann Grimer (1639-?) | Elizabeth Grimer (1642-1702) | William Grimer (1644-?) | Elizabeth Reeve | John Grimer (1644-1728) | Thomas Grimer (1647-?) | Edward Grimer (1652-?)
John Grimer (1677-1751) | Mary Clarke | Robert Grimer (1690-1759) | Hannah Wrench
Hannah Mickleburgh | Robert Grimer (1740-1795) | Hannah Grimer (1723-?) | Elizabeth Grimer (1734-?) | Osmund Clarke (?-1793)
Mary Grimer (1767-?) | Hannah Grimer (1769-1810) | Elizabeth Grimer (1771-?) | Thomas Cooke | Robert Grimer (1772-?)

====== The War Memorial ======
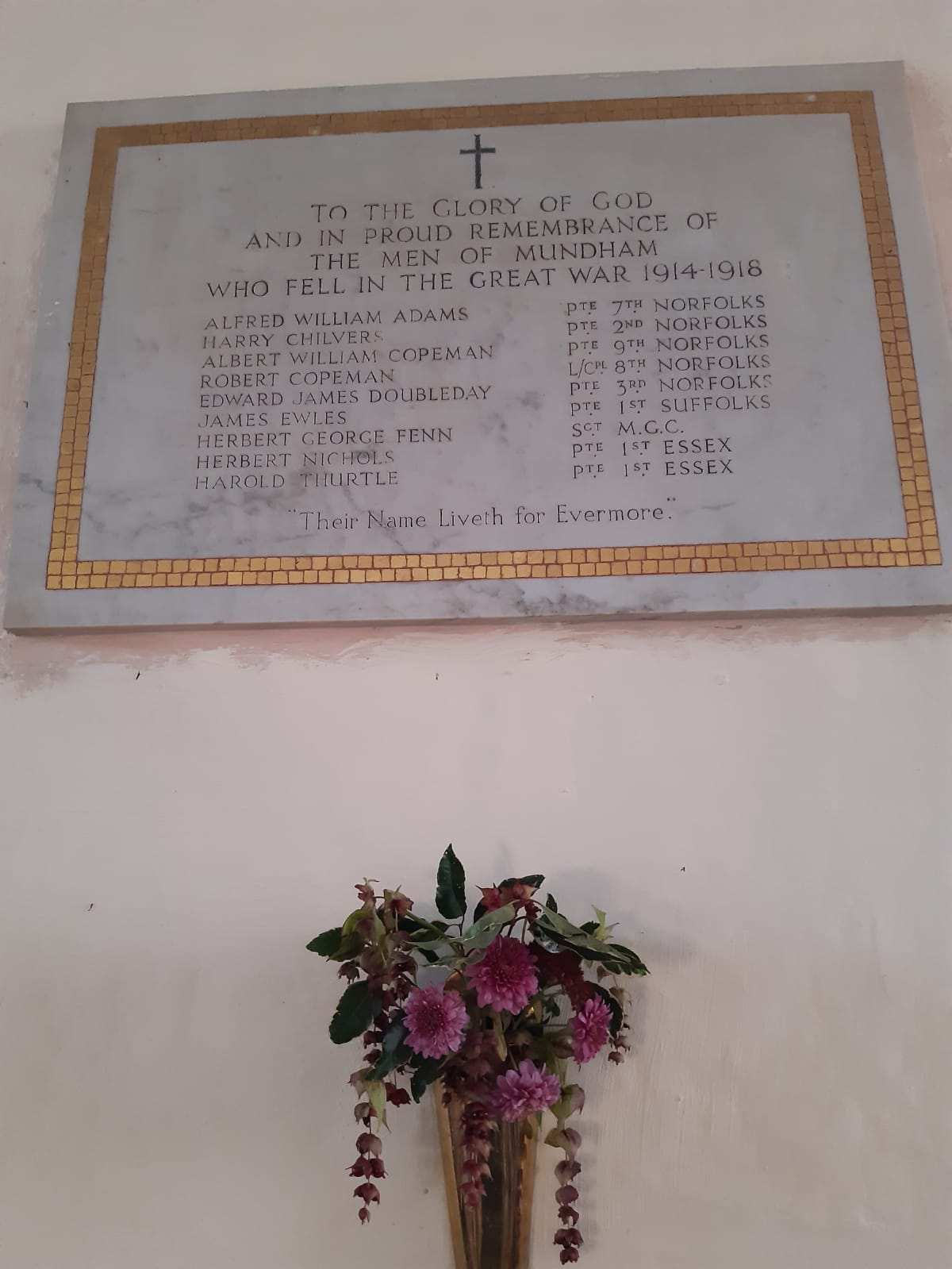
Mundham War Memorial

Mundham's WWI war memorial is located on the southern wall of the aisle of St Peter's Church. It is carved from Italian marble, and was unveiled in memory of those who lost their lives in the war. They are listed below as follows;

- Private Alfred William Adams, served in the 7th Battalion of the Royal Norfolk Regiment, and died at the age of 28 on 1 December 1917 during the German advance in the Battle of Cambrai, his memorial is found at the Cambrai Memorial, Louverval, Panel 4. The 7th (Service) Battalion was raised in August 1914 from men volunteering for Kitchener's New Armies: it landed at Boulogne-sur-Mer as part of the 35th Brigade in the 12th (Eastern) Division in May 1915 for service on the Western Front.
- Private Harry (Henry) Chilvers, served in the 2nd Battalion of the Royal Norfolk Regiment, but was in the 9th Battalion when he died at the age of 43 on 8 October 1918, during the Battle of St Quentin Canal, just over a month before the end of the war. His memorial is found at High Tree Cemetery, Montbrehain, A33. The 2nd Battalion fought in the Mesopotamian campaign.
- Private Albert William Copeman, served in the 9th Battalion of the Royal Norfolk Regiment, and died at the age of 25, on 15 September 1916 during the Battle of the Somme, his memorial is found at the Thiepval Memorial, Pier and Face, 1C and 1D. The 9th (Service) Battalion landed at Boulogne as part of the 71st Brigade in the 24th Division in August 1915 for operations on the Western Front.
- Lance Corporal Robert Copeman, served in the 8th Battalion of the Royal Norfolk Regiment, and died at the age of 23, on 10 December 1916, after the Battle of the Somme. He is commemorated in Mundham Graveyard. The 8th (Service) Battalion landed at Boulogne as part of the 53rd Brigade of the 18th (Eastern) Division in July 1915.
- Private Edward James Doubleday, served in the 1st Battalion of the Royal Norfolk Regiment, but was in the 3rd Battalion when he died at the age of 32 on 4 June 1916, in the Arras sector before the Battle of Arras, his memorial is found at the Arras Memorial, Bay 3. The 1st Battalion was serving in Ireland upon the outbreak of the war and was given orders to mobilise on 4 August, and immediately embarked for France, where they became part of the British Expeditionary Force. They saw their first action of the war against the Imperial German Army at the Battle of Mons in August 1914.
- Private James Ewles, served in the 1st Battalion of the Suffolk Regiment, and died at the age of 43 on 19 January 1919, on the Gallipoli peninsula, his memorial is found at the Ari Burnu Cemetery, Anzac Cove, G.26. The 1st Battalion landed at Le Havre as part of the 84th Brigade in the 28th Division in January 1915 for service on the Western Front and then transferred to Egypt on 24 October 1915.
- Sergeant Herbert George Fenn, served in the Machine Gun Corps, and died at the age of 23, on 8 October 1917 during the Battle of Passchendaele, his memorial is found at the Tyne Cot Memorial, Panel 154 to 159.
- Private Herbert Nichols, served in the 1st Battalion of the Essex Regiment, and died at the age of 23, on 13 August 1915, after landing at Suvla Bay in August 1915 in the Essex Brigade's attempt to restart the stalled Gallipoli Campaign. His memorial is found at the Helles Memorial, Panel 146 to 151 or 229 to 233.
- Private Harold Thurtle, served in the 1st Battalion of the Essex Regiment, and died at the age of 20, on 20 November 1917 during the first day of the Battle of Cambrai, his memorial is found at the Cambrai Memorial, Louverval, Panel 7 and 8.

Only one resident of Mundham died during World War II, that being Guardsman Herbert Bertie Reginald Butcher of the 1st Battalion of the Coldstream Guards, he died at the age of 21, on 22 April 1941. When the Second World War began, the 1st and 2nd battalions of the Coldstream Guards were part of the British Expeditionary Force in France.

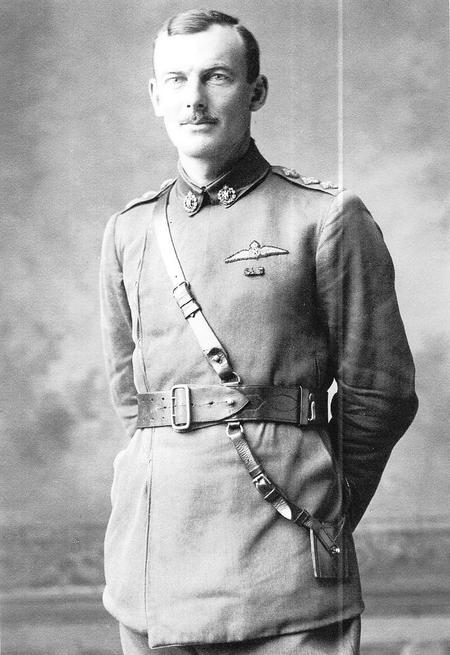
Lt Col George Eardley Todd

====== George Eardley Todd ======
George Todd was born in 1881, to George Nicholas Todd and Bertha Eardley-Wilmot, and married his wife Mary in 1914, he was the churchwarden of St Peter's Church from 1923 until his death in 1939, he is buried in St Peter's graveyard. He held the rank of lieutenant colonel in the British Army, making him both the only known officer and the highest-ranked military personnel to ever reside in Mundham. He received the White Eagle: 4th Class in 1919, and the Croix de Guerre, Chevalier of the Legion of Honor, and Officer of the Most Excellent Order of the British Empire, OBE, after his death. He served as a wing commander in the Royal Flying Corps from 1916 to 1917, and later served in the Welch Regiment in 1920.

====== Samuel Shuckford ======
Samuel Shuckford (c.1693–1754) was an English cleric, antiquarian, and mythographer. He was vicar of Mundham from 1722 until he resigned in 1746. After that, he was given the living of All Saints, Lombard Street, London; and was one of the chaplains of George II. Between 1712 and 1719 he studied at Caius College, Cambridge, graduating B.A. in 1716 and M.A. in 1720, and later being awarded the Lambeth degree of D.D. Shuckford's major work was The Sacred and Profane History of the World, connected from the creation of the world to the dissolution of the Assyrian empire at the death of Sardanapalus, and to the declension of the kingdom of Judah and Israel, under the reigns of Ahaz and Pekah. This work was intended to serve as an introduction to Humphrey Prideaux's Old and New Testament Connected.

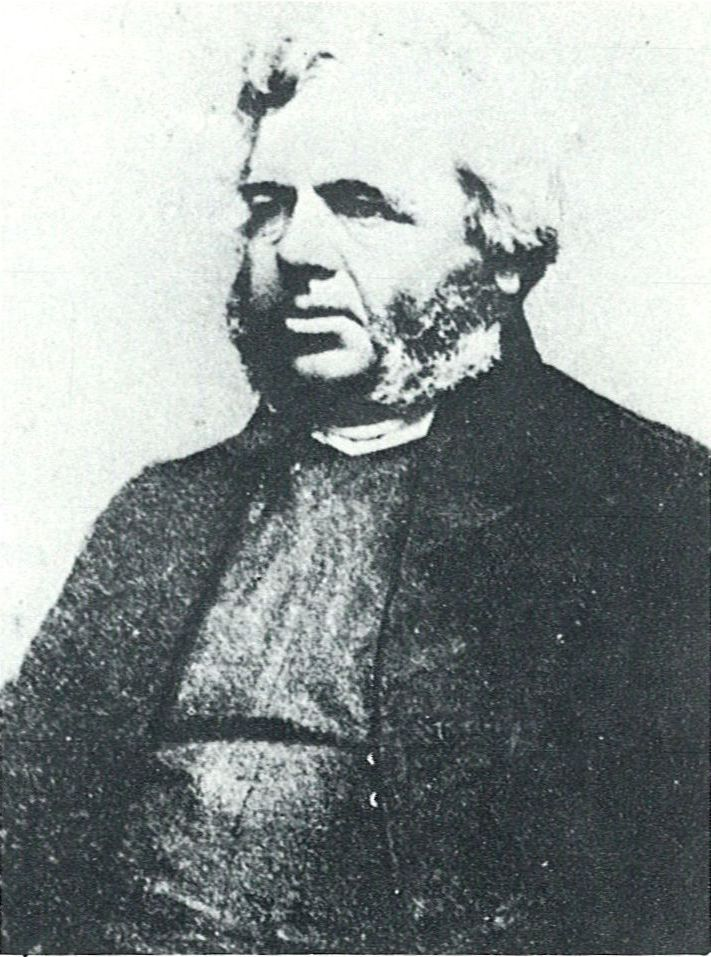
Reverend Octavius Mathias

====== Octavius Mathias ======
Octavius Mathias (27 February 1805 – 18 June 1864) was a pioneering Anglican priest in New Zealand in the mid-nineteenth century, who was born in Mundham. He was Perpetual curate of Horsham St Faith then Vicar of Horsford until 1850 when he emigrated to New Zealand. He was Rector of Canterbury from 1850 to 1855; and Archdeacon of Akaroa from 1855 until his death. He died on 18 June 1864 at Riccarton, New Zealand.

====== Robert Shirley, 13th Earl Ferrers ======
Robert Shirley, 13th Earl Ferrers PC, DL (8 June 1929 – 13 November 2012), styled Viscount Tamworth between 1937 and 1954, was a British Conservative politician and member of the House of Lords as one of the remaining hereditary peers. He was one of the few people to serve in the governments of five prime ministers. He owned and ran a 150 acre farm in Mundham, starting in 1969.

====== George William Lemon ======
The Reverend George William Lemon (1726 - 4 October 1797) was the author of an early etymological dictionary of the English language, published in 1783. Lemon graduated from Queens' College, Cambridge, in 1748. He was Rector of Geytonthorpe, Vicar of East Walton, Norfolk from 1755, and master of Norwich School from 1769 to 1778. He also held the living of Mundham St Peter and St Ethelbert, and also Seething, however he was never instituted to them. Lemon married Elizabeth Young (1735 – 1804) on 31 May 1760. Both are buried in East Walton.

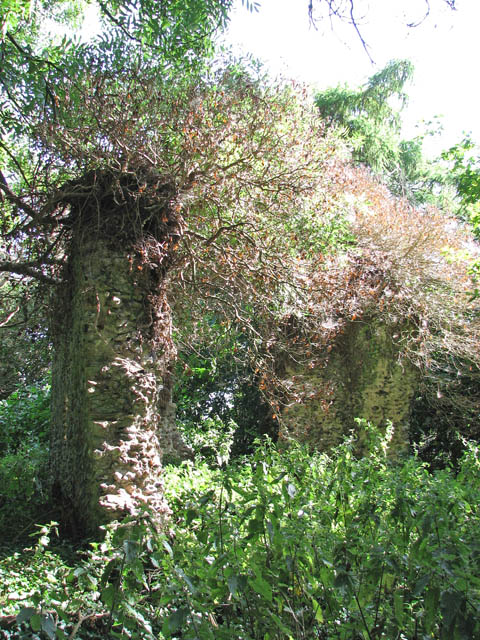
The ruins of St Ethelbert's church

==== St Ethelbert's Church ====
St Ethelbert's Church is a grade II listed, ruined Anglican church, which was originally Catholic, but became an Anglican church during the English reformation, when Mundham split into two different villages in the 12/13th century, it was built for use by the newly created Mundham Parva, and although Mundham reunified in 1454, St Ethelbert's church was not made redundant until 1749, almost 300 years later. It was not well recorded until well into the 13th century, and its rectors date from 1305 until it closed. Located near the centre of Mundham, the ruins of St Ethelbert's church are hidden by a small wooded copse, the edge of the graveyard is marked by the ground sloping away, then there are three pillars of flint and stone topped by elder, two of which form the east wall, either side of a window, while the third forms part of the north wall, these are the remains of the chancel. There are surviving blocks of stone in the former east window outline, and a putlog hole to the right of it.

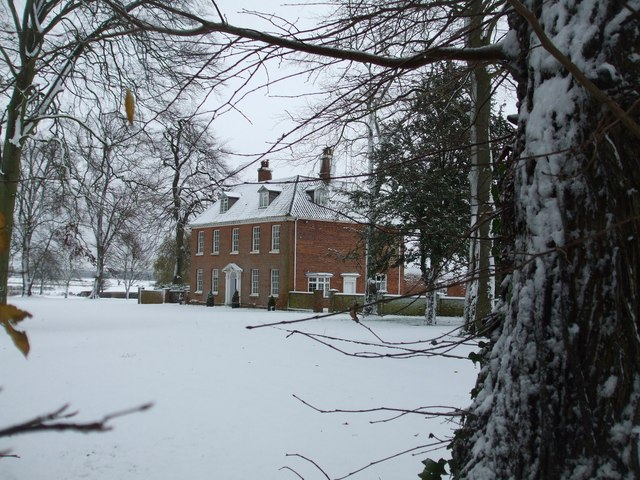
Mundham House

==== Mundham House ====
Mundham House is a grade II listed, late 18th-century, brick house with neoclassical features. It was built in c. 1750, by one Jonathan Farrow, and is shown on the Faden's map from 1797. The house was extended and altered in the 19th and 20th centuries, and has sash windows, with gauged and rubbed brick arches; a central pedimented door; a peacock tail fanlight and an elaborately tiled exterior lavatory dating to c. 1880. The stables also date to the late 18th or early 19th century and have lunette windows. It also appeared in White's 1854 - 1890, under the ownership of another Jonathan Farrow, esq, who, in 1855 committed adultery with an Elizabeth Parr. Later, Mundham house was inherited by Arthur Ernest Powell, esq, as he was the son-in-law of Jonathan Farrow, having married his only daughter, Mary Elizabeth Farrow. He also built a chapel in Mundham.

==== Mundham Hall ====
Southeast of St Peter's Church is the site of Mundham Hall, it was built during the Heptarchy of the Kingdom of East Anglia, sometime after 410 AD, but pre 7th-century, as the Hall was the local authority for the village. They also built St Peter's Church as their personal church, because the idea of a parish church came from the Normans, whom St Peter's Church predates. The hall is first recorded in the Domesday book entry for Mundham as owning a horse. The building was demolished over 200 years ago, however the most recent stables were converted into a private residence, in whose garden the hall's foundations have been found. The site of the hall is also recorded on the 1826 Bryant's map of Norfolk.

==== Mundham Mill ====
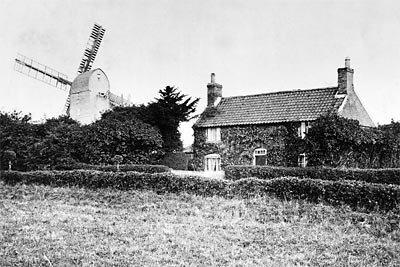
Mundham Mill, c. 1935

Mundham Mill was located at the top of Mundham Common, to which it lends the current house its name. As with many sites in Mundham, the mill is first shown on the 1797 Faden's map of Mundham. In 1819, the mill was owned by William Brown of Sisland, when, on 30 July, two children, Amelia and Robert Pitcher, aged 3 1/2 and 4 3/4 respectively, were killed when they were hit by the mill's sails, Amelia was knocked down by them, and Robert ran to her assistance, before also being struck and killed, Amelia survived the initial accident, however she died soon after. They were both buried in St Peter's Churchyard two days later, and their death was announced in the Essex Herald on 10 August.

The mill is shown on both the 1826 Bryants map, and the 1834 Greenwoods map. From 1845 to 1852, the Mill was under the ownership of William Beverly, (b.1800) who lived in the mill house with his family, his wife Mary Ann and his five children; Mary Ann, William, Michael, Emma and Margrett, however when William Beverly was declared insolvent in 1852, the mill was sold to G.S Kett, who then auctioned off the mill to Uriah Tibbenham in June of the same year, who ran it from 1864 to 1872. It is next mentioned in 1875, under the tenancy of Johnson Goff. In 1883, the previously wind powered mill was changed to a wind and steam method. Johnson continued under tenancy until July 1901, when he bought the mill at auction, which he continued to run until 1908, when it was bought by Ezra Upton, who ran it until its demolition in c. 1936, as by 1937 only the broken wall of the roundhouse remained.

==== The Two Chapels ====
Mundham has had two different chapels, all with different branches of Protestantism, which were Primitive Methodist, Baptist, and Wesleyan Methodist, which later became Methodist. The first chapel, on Mundham Common Road, was founded in 1833 as a Primitive Methodist one, which then became a Baptist chapel in 1849. The second chapel, on Brooke Road, was created in 1893 as a Wesleyan Methodist chapel, constructed by Arthur E. Powell, whom lived in Mundham House at the time, as stated by a stone plaque on the building, however, after the Methodist unification in 1932, it became a Methodist chapel, until its closure in 1980, 87 years later.

=== Mundham St Ethelbert's ===
When Mundham was two separate villages, Mundham St Ethelbert's, also called Mundham Parva (Mundham Lesser), was the larger, sparser, southern part of Mundham and existed until the reunification in 1454. Seething observatory, and now the majority of Seething Airfield, are located within Mundham St Ethelbert's. It was originally known as Mundham Parva, but was called Mundham St Ethelbert's in more recent writings.

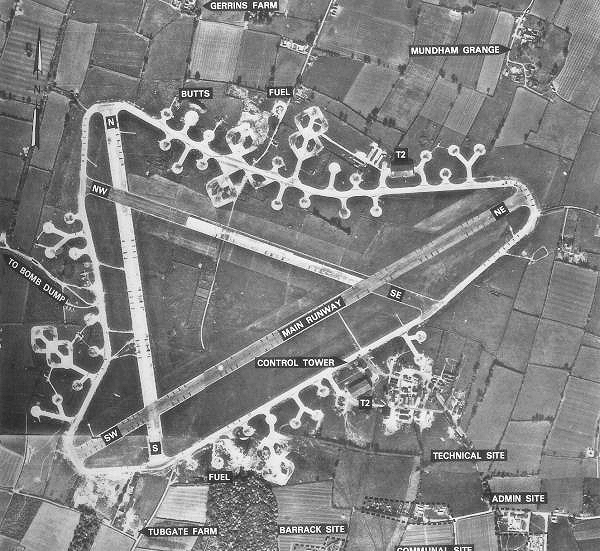
Seething Airfield

==== Seething Airfield ====
Seething Airfield, originally called RAF Seething, was constructed in 1942 for use as an American airbase in the Second World War, and was the base of operations for the 448th Bombardment Group, a part of the 2nd Air Division of the Eighth American Air Force. They flew Liberator bombers in several missions from 1943 to 1945, during which 350 young men lost their lives. The 448th consisted of the 712th, 713th, 714th, and 715th Bombardment Squadron.

RAF Seething was located mostly in Seething, however after the Second World War the areas of the airfield which were in Seething were returned to farmland, leaving none of Seething Airfield inside Seething anymore. In 1963, the Waveney Flying Group purchased the land, which they renovated and continue to use as of 2023.

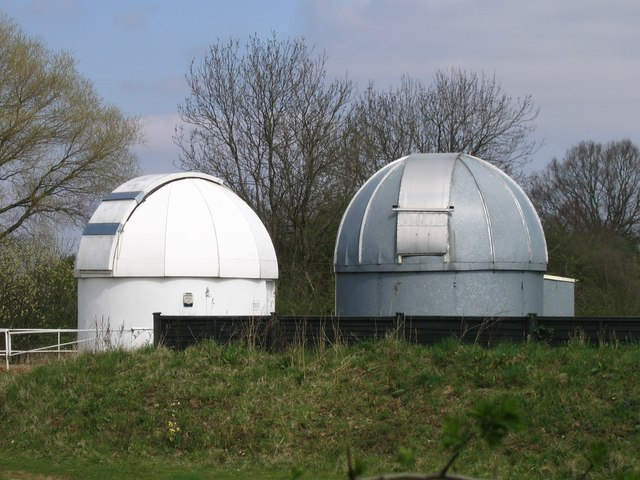
Seething Observatory

==== Seething Observatory ====
Seething Observatory is located in the far south of Mundham, on the north side of Toad Lane, and is run by the Norwich Astronomical Society. Because of the location of the observatory, the light pollution of Mundham is regulated, meaning that the village cannot have any street lights. Because of this, of the five levels of light pollution, (Urban, Suburban, Semi-rural, Rural, & Dark Site) Mundham is at the Rural level, which is the second lowest.

=== Listed buildings ===
In Mundham, there are thirteen listed buildings, twelve of which are Grade II listed, and only one which is Grade I listed, which is St Peter's Church.

| Area | Name | Grading | Description |
|---|---|---|---|
| Mundham Magna | St Peter's Church | Grade I | 12th-century church (with later additions) |
| | St Ethelbert's Church (Ruins) | Grade II | Ruined 13th-century church |
| | Abbey Farmhouse | Grade II | Tudor abbey for St Ethelbert's (built c. 1567) |
| | Elfreder Cottage | Grade II | Late 18th-century cottage |
| | Barn at Elfreder Cottage | Grade II | Late 18th-century barn |
| | Hall Farmhouse | Grade II | Late 16th-century farmhouse |
| | Barn at Hall Farm | Grade II | Early 17th-century barn |
| | White House Farmhouse | Grade II | 17th-century farmhouse |
| | Lower Barn | Grade II | Mid 17th-century |
| | Mundham House | Grade II | Large Georgian house (built c. 1750) |
| | Stables at Mundham House | Grade II | Late 18th-century stables |
| Mundham Parva | The Laurels | Grade II | Late 17th-century house |
| | Mundham Grange | Grade II | Late 17th-century farmhouse |

== Geography ==
At 52.528°N 1.441°E, 97 miles northeast of London, Mundham's topography is similar to most of East Anglia, and is made up of river meadows and flat agricultural landscapes, with a combination of sandy soil in the north, and clayey soil in the south. As of 2023, land cover mostly consists of cultivated crops and Hay, along with scattered trees, mostly consisting of various varieties of Oak trees. The geological system of Mundham mostly consists of Cainozoic Sedimentary rock, with a layer of Eocene clay and sand laid down in the Paleogene Period. Mundham lies at an average elevation of 30 metres, with a range of 16 to 41 metres, being lower in the north, and higher to the south,

Mundham Magna has slightly acidic loamy and clayey soils with impeded drainage, and low carbon. The cropping of Mundham is reasonably flexible but more suited to autumn sown crops and grassland. Mundham Parva has similar soil, albeit slightly less fertile, however it has more clay and therefore slower drainage, and although it is still slightly acidic, the soil is base rich.

=== Climate ===
Like most of Norfolk, and much of the British Isles, Mundham has a temperate maritime climate (Köppen: Cfb), with relatively cool summers and mild winters. There is regular but generally light precipitation throughout the year. Mundham's average annual rainfall is 626.2 millimetres (24.65 in) compared to the UK average of 1,125.0 millimetres (44.29 in), and its mean rain days are 115.8 per annum, compared to the UK average of 154.4.

Climate data for Mundham, 1991-2020
| Month | Jan | Feb | Mar | Apr | May | Jun | Jul | Aug | Sep | Oct | Nov | Dec | Year |
|---|---|---|---|---|---|---|---|---|---|---|---|---|---|
| Mean daily maximum °C (°F) | 7.25 (45.05) | 8.01 (46.42) | 10.83 (51.49) | 14.05 (57.29) | 17.63 (63.73) | 20.83 (69.49) | 22.78 (73.00) | 22.71 (72.88) | 19.70 (67.46) | 15.02 (59.04) | 10.73 (51.31) | 7.75 (45.95) | 14.81 (58.66) |
| Daily mean °C (°F) | 5 (41) | 5 (41) | 7 (45) | 9 (48) | 12 (54) | 15 (59) | 17 (63) | 17 (63) | 15 (59) | 12 (54) | 8 (46) | 5 (41) | 11 (52) |
| Mean daily minimum °C (°F) | 1.53 (34.75) | 1.46 (34.63) | 2.64 (36.75) | 4.66 (40.39) | 7.66 (45.79) | 10.22 (50.40) | 11.90 (53.42) | 12.03 (53.65) | 10.04 (50.07) | 7.52 (45.54) | 4.05 (39.29) | 2.19 (35.94) | 6.35 (43.43) |
| Average rainfall mm (inches) | 52.26 (2.06) | 44.47 (1.75) | 44.59 (1.76) | 37.90 (1.49) | 38.02 (1.50) | 57.14 (2.25) | 45.25 (1.78) | 58.07 (2.29) | 46.10 (1.81) | 66.35 (2.61) | 78.24 (3.08) | 57.80 (2.28) | 626.19 (24.65) |
| Average rainy days (≥ 1.0 mm) | 11.07 | 9.76 | 8.64 | 8.66 | 8.12 | 9.06 | 9.06 | 9.29 | 8.64 | 10.61 | 11.49 | 11.43 | 115.84 |
| Average relative humidity (%) | 86 | 83 | 79 | 76 | 75 | 75 | 74 | 75 | 79 | 83 | 87 | 87 | 80 |
| Average dew point °C (°F) | 3 (37) | 2 (36) | 3 (37) | 5 (41) | 8 (46) | 10 (50) | 12 (54) | 12 (54) | 11 (52) | 9 (48) | 6 (43) | 3 (37) | 7 (45) |
| Mean monthly sunshine hours | 64.43 | 71.41 | 118.35 | 175.00 | 217.19 | 207.23 | 217.53 | 200.32 | 162.28 | 110.81 | 68.44 | 62.31 | 1,675.3 |
Source: Met Office

== Demography ==
The demography of Mundham is recorded from 1801 to 2021 and is shown in the table below.

Age distribution of Mundham residents, 2021
| 0–9 years | 2.0% |
| 10–19 years | 6.8% |
| 20–29 years | 6.1% |
| 30–39 years | 7.5% |
| 40–49 years | 11.6% |
| 50–59 years | 19.7% |
| 60-69 years | 22.4% |
| 70–79 years | 19.1% |
| 80+ years | 4.8% |
Source: 2021 census

Religion of Mundham residents, 2021
| Christian | 59.2% |
| No religion | 38.1% |
| Religion not stated | 6.1% |
| Sikh | 0.7% |
| Buddhist | 0.7% |
Source: 2021 census

| Year | Houses | Families | Population | Males | Females | Area (acres) |
|---|---|---|---|---|---|---|
| 1801 | 46 | 51 | 242 | 119 | 123 | |
| 1811 | 46 | 56 | 265 | 130 | 135 | |
| 1821 | 44 | 65 | 304 | 161 | 143 | |
| 1831 | 48 | 64 | 314 | 164 | 150 | 1500 |
| 1841 | 70 | | 308 | 162 | 146 | 1527 |
| 1851 | 70 | | 293 | 155 | 138 | 1547 |
| 1861 | 61 | | 282 | | | 1547 |
| 1871 | 63 | 67 | 269 | | | 1547 |
| 1881 | 66 | 63 | 295 | 152 | 143 | 1547 |
| 1891 | 64 | 59 | 282 | 158 | 124 | 1562 |
| 1901 | 62 | 52 | 233 | 126 | 107 | 1562 |
| 1911 | | 59 | 234 | 131 | 103 | 1562 |
| 1921 | 59 | 61 | 234 | 123 | 108 | 1562 |
| 1931 | 62 | 62 | 218 | 108 | 110 | 1562 |
| 1941 | | | | | | 1562 |
| 1951 | 53 | 53 | 183 | 101 | 82 | 1562 |
| 1961 | 54 | 54 | 164 | 82 | 82 | 1562 |
| 1971 | 55 | 53 | 144 | | | |
| 1981 | | | 159 | | | |
| 1991 | | | 164 | | | |
| 2001 | 63 | 63 | 168 | | | 1559 |
| 2011 | 64 | 64 | 177 | | | 1559 |
| 2021 | 67 | 67 | 147 | 73 | 74 | 1559 |

== Public services ==
Policing in Mundham is provided by Norfolk Constabulary, Statutory emergency fire and rescue service is provided by the Norfolk Fire and Rescue Service, of which the nearest station is in Loddon.

The nearest NHS hospital is Norfolk and Norwich University Hospital in Norwich, administered by Norfolk and Norwich University Hospitals NHS Foundation Trust. Ambulance services are provided by East of England Ambulance Service.

Waste management is coordinated by South Norfolk Council. Locally produced inert waste for disposal is processed into fuel for use in combined heat and power facilities in Europe. Mundham's distribution network operator for electricity is UK Power Networks. Drinking water and waste water are managed by Anglian Water.

== Notable residents ==
- William Harborne: First english ambassador to Constantinople, who later retired to, and died, in Mundham.
- Samuel Shuckford: English cleric, antiquarian, mythographer, and author of The Sacred and Profane History of the World, and was the vicar of Mundham from 1822 to 1846.
- Octavius Mathias: Pioneering Anglican priest in New Zealand in the mid-nineteenth century, who was born in Mundham in 1805.
