= Sisland =

Village in Norfolk, England

Coordinates: 52.53473°N 1.45393°E

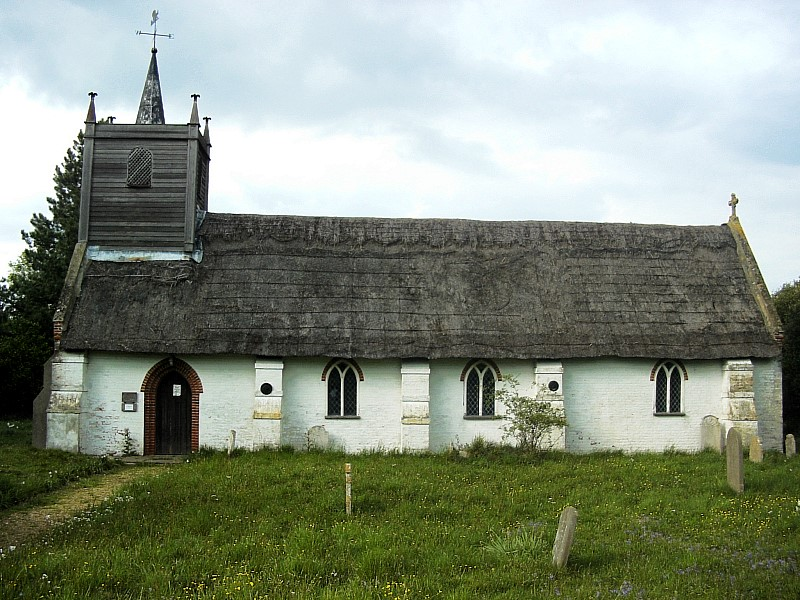
- Sisland St Mary

- Location within Norfolk
- Area: 1.90 km^{2} (0.73 sq mi)
- Population: 44
  - Density: 23/km^{2} (60/sq mi)
- OS grid reference: TM343985
  - London: 98 Miles
- Civil parish: Sisland
- District: South Norfolk
- Shire county: Norfolk
- Region: East
- Country: England
- Sovereign state: United Kingdom
- Post town: NORWICH
- Postcode district: NR14
- Dialling code: 01508
- Police: Norfolk
- Fire: Norfolk
- Ambulance: East of England
- UK Parliament: South Norfolk

Sisland, historically Sislanda, is a very small village, manor and parish in the county of Norfolk, England, about a mile west of Loddon. In the 2001 census, the population was 44 in 16 households. The parish covers an area of 1.90 km^{2} (0.73 sq mi), and is approximately 9.3 miles (15.0 km) southeast of Norwich and 12.7 miles (20.4 km) west of Great Yarmouth. For the purposes of local government, it falls within the district of South Norfolk, however Sisland does have its own Parish Council. The village contains only one heritage-listed building, that being St Mary's Church, which is Grade II*.

== Location ==
Sisland is located in the electoral district of Loddon which is located in the South Norfolk district of the county of Norfolk, England. Sisland lies at an average elevation of 16 meters, with a range of 11 to 21 meters, and is located 9.3 miles southeast of Norwich. Sisland borders Langley to the north, while in the north east, it borders Chedgrave, and in the north west it borders Thurton. In the west, it borders with Bergh Apton and in both the south and the east it borders Loddon. In the southwest Sisland borders with Mundham.

=== Geography ===
Sisland's topography is, like most of East Anglia, made up of river meadows and flat agricultural landscape. Land cover today mostly consists of cultivated crops and Hay, along with scattered trees, including a small patch of mixed woodland, called Sisland Carr. The geological system of Sisland mostly consists of Cainozoic Sedimentary rock, with a layer of Eocene clay and sand laid down in the Paleogene Period.

=== Climate ===
Sisland has a temperate maritime climate like much of the British Isles, with relatively cooler summers and milder winters. There is regular but mostly light precipitation scattered throughout the year.

Climate data for Sisland, 1991-2020
Month	Jan	Feb	Mar	Apr	May	Jun	Jul	Aug	Sep	Oct	Nov	Dec	Year
Mean daily maximum °C (°F)	7.25 (45.05)	8.01 (46.42)	10.83 (51.49)	14.05 (57.29)	17.63 (63.73)	20.83 (69.49)	22.78 (73.00)	22.71 (72.88)	19.70 (67.46)	15.02 (59.04)	10.73 (51.31)	7.75 (45.95)	14.81 (58.66)
Mean daily minimum °C (°F)	1.53 (34.75)	1.46 (34.63)	2.64 (36.75)	4.66 (40.39)	7.66 (45.79)	10.22 (50.40)	11.90 (53.42)	12.03 (53.65)	10.04 (50.07)	7.52 (45.54)	4.05 (39.29)	2.19 (35.94)	6.35 (43.43)
Average rainfall mm (inches)	52.26 (2.06)	44.47 (1.75)	44.59 (1.76)	37.90 (1.49)	38.02 (1.50)	57.14 (2.25)	45.25 (1.78)	58.07 (2.29)	46.10 (1.81)	66.35 (2.61)	78.24 (3.08)	57.80 (2.28)	626.19 (24.65)
Average rainy days (≥ 1.0 mm)	11.07	9.76	8.64	8.66	8.12	9.06	9.06	9.29	8.64	10.61	11.49	11.43	115.84
Mean monthly sunshine hours	64.43	71.41	118.35	175.00	217.19	207.23	217.53	200.32	162.28	110.81	68.44	62.31	1,675.3
Source: Met Office

== History ==
In 1086, Sisland had a population of 8.8 households and had its land split between 2 different owners, giving it an estimated population of 44. In the Domesday Book, it is listed as:

"Sislanda:
King's land, in the custody of Godric. 3 oxen."

However, as the current land of Sisland was split between Sisland and the lost village of Washingford, the population of Sisland was 89 in total.

=== Washingford ===
In the northwest of the village are the earthworks of the medieval village of Washingford, including house platforms, however the area is now pasture land. Washingford was mentioned in the Domesday Book, and had a population of 9 households and was owned by Godric the Steward, giving it an estimated population of 45, and was listed as:

"Wasingaford:
Godric the steward. Mill."

Washingford now lends its name to several houses named Washingford in Sisland and the other surrounding villages, including Washingford Bridge in Mundham.

=== St Mary's Church ===
The original church was a Norman construction, which reused some Roman material, as well as that, the foundations of the church are built over a late Saxon grave site. The modern iteration of Sisland Church is a wood cladded, thatched, mid 18th Century Church, the previous, 14th century, iteration was destroyed by lightning on Sunday 12th July 1761 at three o'clock in the afternoon, during afternoon service, and was rebuilt almost immediately afterwards. The former north wall was reused, and the remaining ruins were left standing round the back of the church. The only thing which remains from the old church is the 15th century font in an East Anglian style. The church is grade II* listed.

=== Sisland Mill ===
Sisland Mill was at Washingford Farm and had stopped working by the mid 1800s.

=== Sisland Manor ===
In 1066 Ketil is recorded as Lord of the Manor of Sislanda. Ketil held many other manors, some as Lord, and others as Overlord, however in 1086, after the Norman conquest of England, Godric is recorded in the Domesday Book as Lord of the Manor of Sislanda, together with other manors, including Londe (Loddon)

Ralph de Lodne, with the consent of Gosceline, his son, gave by deed sans date to the nunnery of Wykes in Essex, with Beatrice his daughter, the tithe of his house and land at Preston in Suffolk: this was in the time of William (Turbe) Bishop of Norwich, as appears by the deed, and in the reign of Henry II of England. When Gosceline de Lodne was lord died, his son, Goscelin inherited his father's land, however, as he died childless, his five sisters were his heirs; Alicia, who married William de Beauchamp, Agnes married William de Ryvill, Susan, married to Hugh de Somerton, Emma to Ralph de Hoo, and Lescilina, to Peter de Brokeley. Alicia, who married William Beauchamp, had her part of the estate, and also the part of her sister Agnes, who granted it to her and her husband. The de Beauchamp family held the Manor of Sisland until John de Beauchamp, gave his interest in the Manor of Syseland and the land and advowson of Lodne, to Edward, son of Sir William Charles, and Alice.

Sir William Charles had been granted the manor and advowson of Kettleburgh in Suffolk by Prince Edward who later became Edward I of England. He built his manor house there in 1261 and established Kettleburgh as the family seat. Charles's family lived in the manor house until 1507. William, son of William Charles, was the lord of the Manor of Syseland in the reign of Edward II (1307-1327). Edward Charles, held the Manor of Syseland in the reign of Edward III (1327-1377). Edward was his son and heir. In 1400, Sir Robert Charles was lord of The Manor of Syseland and of Kettleburgh, he died that year and gave the lordships of Kettleburgh, Syseland, and Eston to his wife, Anne, also the advowson of Thweyte, paying 20/-. per year to Thomas, his eldest son, and she to have the education of his son Robert: his will is dated on the feast of St. Peter 1400, and he was buried in the chapel of Kettleburgh church, by the tomb of his father.

In 1420, the 7th of Henry V. Sir Thomas Charles, Knt. died, and his son and heir Thomas, aged 15, inherited his lands, however, in about 1442, during the reign of Henry VI, Thomas and his wife, Elizabeth, conveyed the manor of Syseland, with lands in Lodne, &c. to John, Duke of Norfolk. During the time Sisland Manor was held by the Charles family it became known locally as the Manor of "Sisland otherwise Charles".

=== Demography 1801 to 2021 ===
Year	Houses	Families	Population	Males	Females	Area (Acres)
1801	7	10	54	28	26	---
1811	7	9	55	26	29	---
1821	9	14	101	61	40	---
1831	10	11	85	52	33	410
1841	12	--	64	33	31	---
1851	13	--	77	38	39	466
1861	13	--	76	--	--	466
1871	13	12	75	--	--	466
1881	13	13	71	33	38	466
1891	13	14	69	26	43	469
1901	15	12	69	39	30	469
1911	--	13	73	37	36	469
1921	14	14	73	40	33	469
1931	13	13	71	38	36	469
1941	13	--	--	--	--	469
1951	13	15	55	28	27	469
1961	14	14	53	26	27	469
1971	--	--	--	--	--	---
1981	--	--	--	--	--	---
1991	--	--	--	--	--	---
2001	16	16	44	--	--	470
2011	--	--	--	--	--	---
2021	--	--	--	--	--	---

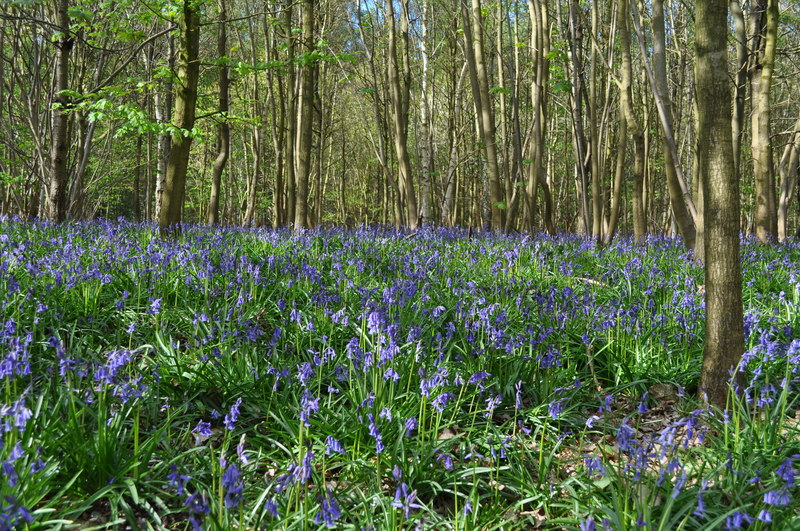
Bluebells at Sisland Carr

== Sisland Carr ==
Sisland Carr is a small mixed woodland which is located at grid reference TM345991. It is privately owned but is managed by the Woodland Trust. There is road access and a car park, but the access road is in poor condition.

The site has a total area of 11.66 ha (28.8 acres), which is made up of 8.1 hectares (20 acres) mixed secondary woodland and 3.64 hectares (9.0 acres) wet meadow, including conifers which have been surrounded in a C shape by British broadleaf woodland, which was planted after damage caused by the Great Storm of 1987. The site is known for its bluebells in the spring.

== Public services ==
Policing in Sisland is provided by Norfolk Constabulary, Statutory emergency fire and rescue service is provided by the Norfolk Fire and Rescue Service, of which the nearest station is in Loddon. The nearest NHS hospital is Norfolk and Norwich University Hospital in Norwich, Ambulance services are provided by East of England Ambulance Service.

Waste management is co-ordinated by South Norfolk Council. Locally produced inert waste for disposal is processed into fuel for use in combined heat and power facilities in Europe. Sisland's distribution network operator for electricity is UK Power Networks. Drinking water and waste water are managed by Anglian Water.
