= Samuel Shuckford =

English cleric, antiquarian, and mythographer (c.1694–1754)

Samuel Shuckford (c. 1694 – 14 July 1754) was an English cleric, antiquarian, and scholar.

== Life ==
The son of Samuel Shuckford of Palgrave, Suffolk, he was born at Norwich about 1694, and educated at the grammar schools of Norwich and Botesdale, Suffolk. From 1712 to 1719 he was scholar of Caius College, Cambridge, graduating B.A. in 1716 and M.A. in 1720, and later being awarded the Lambeth degree of D.D.

Shuckford was ordained deacon on 16 June 1717, and priest on 28 October 1718. In 1722 he was presented to the rectory of Shelton, Norfolk, which he resigned in 1746. He held with it the living of Hardwick, and was also vicar of Seething and Mundham, Norfolk. He was instituted to the tenth prebend in Canterbury Cathedral on 21 March 1738. Subsequently he was given the living of All Saints, Lombard Street, London; and was one of George II's chaplains.

Shuckford died on 14 July 1754, and was buried in Canterbury Cathedral.

== Works ==
Shuckford's major work was The Sacred and Profane History of the World, connected from the creation of the world to the dissolution of the Assyrian empire at the death of Sardanapalus, and to the declension of the kingdom of Judah and Israel, under the reigns of Ahaz and Pekah, 2 vols. 1728. This work was intended to serve as an introduction to Humphrey Prideaux's Old and New Testament Connected; it was reprinted, 3 vols., London, 1731–40; 4 vols. London, 1743 seq.; London, 1754; 4 vols. 1808, edited by Adam Clarke; new edition, with The Creation and Fall of Man (1753), 2 vols. Oxford, 1810. There was another edition of both works with notes and analyses, by James Talboys Wheeler, 2 vols. London, 1858. Shuckford's approach to myth has been called "a sobering example of the literalist mentality".

A Connection of Sacred and Profane History, from the death of Joshua to the decline of the kingdoms of Israel and Judah (intended to complete the works of Shuckford and Prideaux), by Michael Russell, appeared in 3 vols. London, 1827.

== Notes ==
Attribution

This article incorporates text from a publication now in the public domain: Lee, Sidney, ed. (1897). "Shuckford, Samuel". Dictionary of National Biography. Vol. 52. London: Smith, Elder & Co.
