= George William Lemon =

Author of an early etymological dictionary of the English language

The Reverend George William Lemon (1726 – 4 October 1797) was the author of an early etymological dictionary of the English language, published in 1783.

Lemon graduated from Queens' College, Cambridge, in 1748. He was Rector of Geytonthorpe, Vicar of East Walton, Norfolk from 1755, and master of Norwich School from 1769 to 1778. He also held the living of Mundham St Peter and St Ethelbert, and also Seething, however he was never instituted to them.

Lemon married Elizabeth Young (1735 – 25 September 1804) on 31 May 1760. Both are buried in East Walton.

== English Etymology (1783) ==
Lemon considered the English language as founded on six older idioms:

1. "The Hebrew, or Phoenician" (Semitic)
2. "The Greek"
3. "The Latin, or Italian" (Romance)
4. "The Celtic, or French"
5. "The Saxon, Teutonic, or German" (West Germanic)
6. "The Icelandic, and other Northern dialects" (North Germanic)

The entries consequently focus on English words of Latin or Greek derivation. Twenty years before the discovery of Grimm's law, Lemon could not be expected to give sound etymologies of Germanic words, and promptly derived acorn from Greek akros, or addle from Greek athlos. Yet Lemon's dictionary is of historical interest as a pioneer work of philology on the eve of the discoveries of William Jones, Friedrich Schlegel and Rasmus Rask that mark the beginning of modern linguistics.

Ralph Griffiths' Monthly Review in 1785 (vol. 71 , 171-177) reviewed Lemon's dictionary as an extraordinary and delectable work:

The author, perched on his etymological dunghill, claps his wings, and crows in defiance of all who have scraped the dunghill before him. He hath found jewels which escaped their superficial search; and, like a cock of wisdom, knows how to use them when he hath found them; — and is disposed to call us fools for not comprehending their value.

== Works ==
- Two Tracts, London, 1773

(a) ‘Additional Observations on the Greek Accents, by the late Edward Spelman, esq.,’ (ed. Lemon)
(b) ‘The Voyage of Æneas from Troy to Italy, in part intended to “lay before the readers specimens of a much larger attempt, viz: an intire new translation of the works of Virgil.”’

- Græcæ Grammaticæ Rudimenta, 1774
- English Etymology Or, A Derivative Dictionary Of The English Language: In Two Alphabets. Tracing the Etymology of those Words that are derived (1.) from the Greek and Latin Languages; (2.) from the Saxon and Northern Tongues. The Whole Compiled From Vossius, Meric Casaubon, Spelman, Somner, Minshew, Junius, Skinner, Verstegan, Ray, Nugent, John Upton, Cleland, And Other Etymologists, 1783.
- The History of the Civil War between York and Lancaster, comprehending the lives of Edward IV and his brother Richard III. Lynn, W. Whittingham, 1792
