= Thomas Glover (diplomat) =

English ambassador

Sir Thomas Glover was an English ambassador to the Sublime Porte of the Ottoman Empire in Constantinople from 1606 to 1611.

== Biography ==
Glover was born to a Protestant family, his great uncle had been burnt at the stake for his beliefs during the reign of Queen Mary, while during the reign of Elizabeth I his father rose to become Sheriff of London. According to Scottish author and traveller William Lithgow, Glover was born to an English father and a Polish mother and was born and raised in Constantinople, where Glover served as secretary to the English ambassadors Edward Barton and Sir Henry Lello before succeeding Lello as ambassador on 23 December 1606. Fluent in Turkish, Greek, Italian and Polish, he was a competent diplomat and respected in the court. He is known to have imprisoned the Catholic traveler and scholar Hugh Holland for speaking out against Elizabeth.

From 1607, Glover hosted Stefan Bogdan, a pretender to the Moldavian throne and jeopardized his position by his lobbying on Bogdan's behalf. In 1611, Glover was recalled to London at the suggestion of Anthony Shirley, accused of being more of an agent for Spain than England. The charges were subsequently dropped and he was rewarded for his service to the state, suggesting that his support of Bogdan had been sanctioned.

The English writer William Strachey served as his secretary for a period and he also gave lodging to other travellers and writers including the aforementioned Lithgow and George Sandys. Glover was recalled to London in a company letter dated 17 September 1611.

Glover's wife Anne Lambe, an English woman he had met and married in England and brought to Constantinople, died in 1608 but her body was preserved in bran and not buried until 1612.

Diplomatic posts
Preceded by Sir Henry Lello	Ambassador to the Ottoman Empire; 1606 - 17 September 1611	Succeeded by Sir Paul Pindar
