= Seething Airfield =

Civil airfield in Norfolk, England

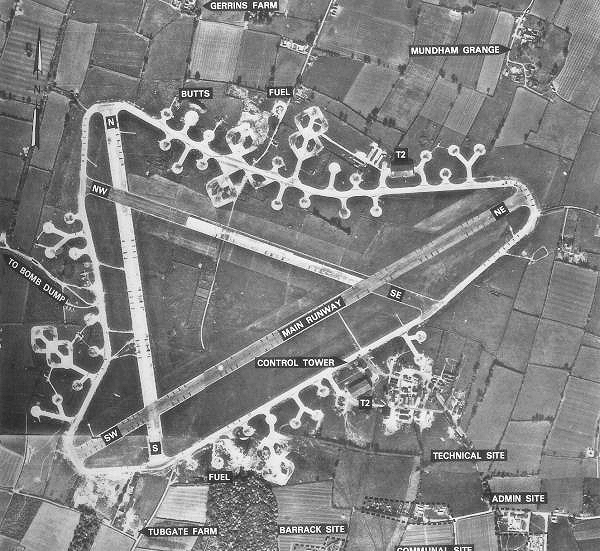
- Aerial photograph of RAF Seething in 1945
- IATA: none; ICAO: EGSJ

Summary
- Airport type: Public
- Operator: Wingtask 1995 Ltd.
- Location: Mundham, Norwich
- Elevation AMSL: 130 ft / 40 m
- Coordinates: 52°30′40″N 001°25′02″E

Map
- Location in Norfolk

Runways
Direction	Length		Surface
Direction	m	ft	Surface
06/24	800	2,625	Asphalt
- Sources: Official website

Seething Airfield (ICAO: EGSJ), formerly RAF Seething, is located 10 miles (16 km) south–southeast of Norwich, East Anglia, England.

Seething Airfield (EGSJ) is a privately owned airfield in Norfolk, England, just south of the villages of Mundham and Seething, south east of Norwich. The aerodrome is home to the Waveney Flying Group and is officially open to visitors Saturdays and Sundays from 0900 to around 1700 hrs (sunset in winter).

Founded in 1960, the Waveney Flying Group leased the former United States Army Air Forces (USAAF) airbase from local farmers, and went on to purchase the land in 1963. Its close proximity to Great Yarmouth meant it saw quite a bit of celebrity use in the 60s and 70s when stars such as The Hollies, The Rolling Stones and Mike and Bernie Winters dropped in. In latter years, the new millennium has seen both the club house and hangars developed culminating with their official opening by Wing Cdr. Ken Wallis MBE in 2001.

== See also ==
- List of Norfolk airfields
- List of airports in the United Kingdom and the British Crown Dependencies
