= Octavius Mathias =

Anglican archdeacon (1805–1864)

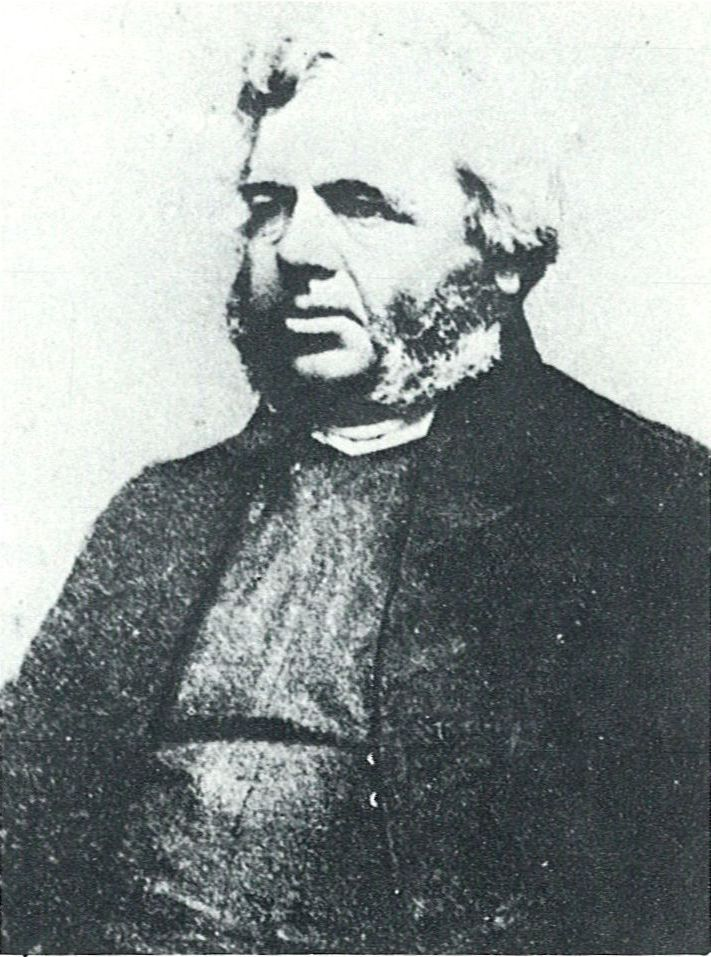
Reverend Octavius Mathias

Octavius Mathias (27 February 1805 – 18 June 1864) was a pioneering Anglican priest in New Zealand in the mid-nineteenth century.

Mathias was born at Mundham in 1805. He was educated at Corpus Christi College, Cambridge and ordained in 1829. He was perpetual curate of Horsham St Faith then vicar of Horsford until 1850 when he immigrated to New Zealand. He was rector of Canterbury from 1850 to 1855; and archdeacon of Akaroa from 1855 until his death. He died on 18 June 1864 at Riccarton, Christchurch.
