= William Harborne =

English diplomat (c.1542–1617)

- Born: 1542; Great Yarmouth, Norfolk
- Died: 9 September 1617 (aged 74–75); Mundham
- Resting place: St. Peter's Church, Mundham
- Predecessor: N/A
- Successor: Edward Barton (diplomat)
- Children: John Harborne, Elizabeth Randall (nee Harborne)

William Harborne of Great Yarmouth, Norfolk (c.1542–1617) was a diplomat, businessman, and English Ambassador to the Ottoman Empire, appointed by Queen Elizabeth I of England.

== Establishment of the English Embassy in Constantinople ==
Following a visit to Constantinople in 1575 by English merchants John Wright and Joseph Clements, Harborne was employed in 1578 by a group of English merchants to travel to Constantinople, via Poland, and obtain permission from the Sultan Murat III for English ships to trade in Ottoman ports. Previously only the French had enjoyed this privilege, which was granted to Harborne in 1580 following negotiations with Sadrazam Sokollu Mehmed Pasha, and correspondence between Queen Elizabeth I and the Sultan.

Harborne thus became English Ambassador, in the pay of the Levant Company, an association of traders created for this purpose, led by Edward Osborne and Richard Staper, who had accompanied Harborne on his visits. Harborne received diplomatic credentials from Queen Elizabeth on 20 November 1582. Sailing to Constantinople from London he arrived on 26 March 1583 bearing lavish gifts for the Sultan including an expensive clock.

Harborne played a key role in preventing the Ottoman Empire from supporting Catholic Spain in the war with Protestant England that was taking place at the time. Harborne was able to persuade the Porte that Spain was a threat to peace for all of Europe. Although he was unable to obtain a military alliance with the Ottomans, the Spanish-Ottoman protocol was not renewed in 1587. The Elizabethan Treaty was renewed and would survive for 343 years with England and Turkey.

Harborne also succeeded in obtaining from the Ottomans capitulations and other tariff reductions for English goods, and was charged with obtaining samples and information regarding dyestuffs and fabrics used in the production of cloth and clothing in Turkey at that time. The ambassador departed in August 1588 and was succeeded by Sir Edward Barton, by which time trade had begun to thrive and the post was one of the most powerful positions in the English foreign service.

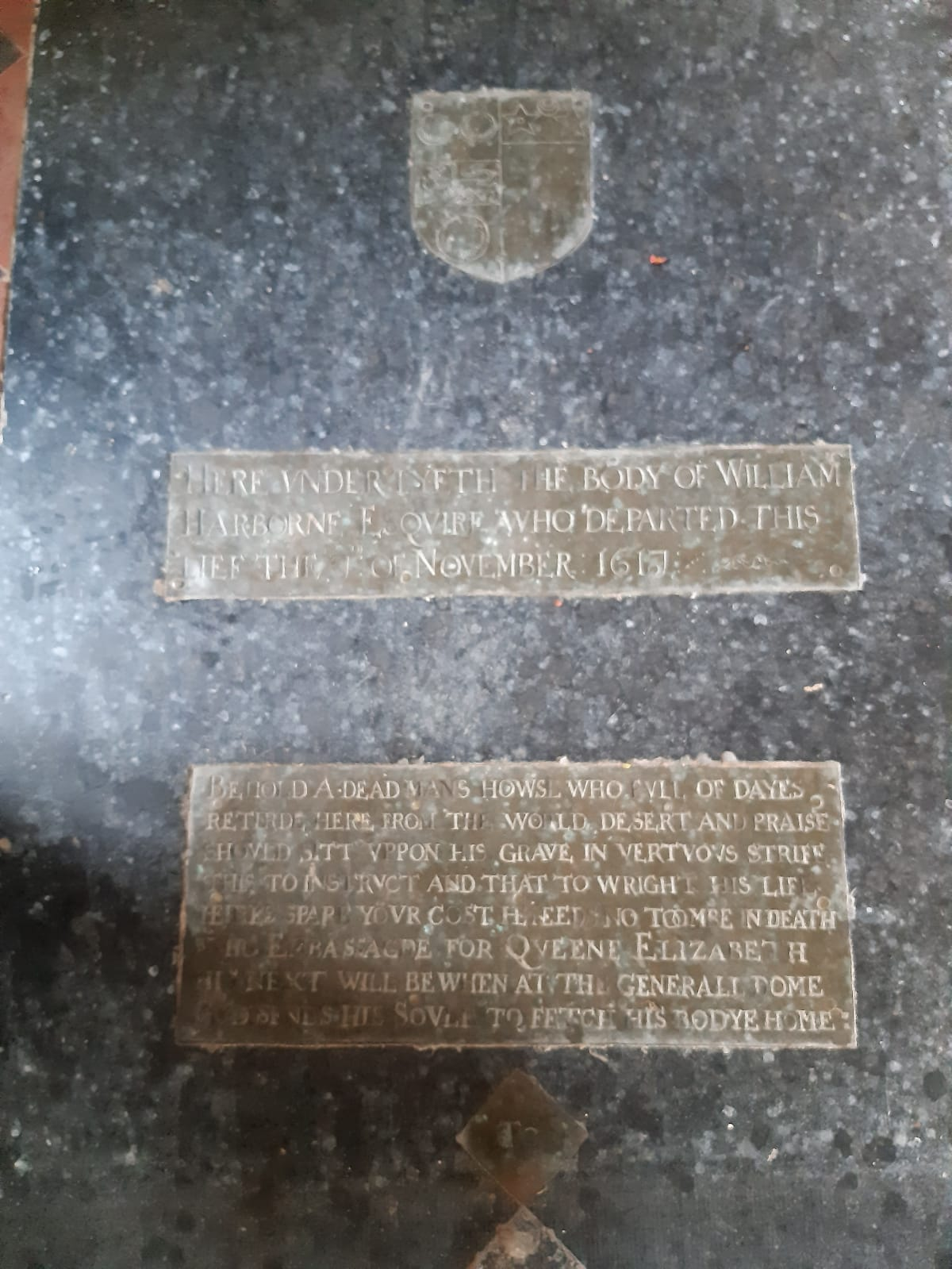
Harborne's Memorial in Mundham

On his return to England Harborne settled at Mundham, Norfolk. He died there on 6 November 1617 and was buried in that parish. There is a monument to his memory in the parish, with a eulogistic inscription in English verse. The Plaque reads:

Behold a dead mans howse who full of dayes
Retirde here from the world; desert and praise
Should sitt uppon his grave in vertuous strife
This to instruct and that to wright his life
Heires spare your cost; he needs no tombe in death
Who Embassied for Queene Elizabeth
His next will be when at the generall dome
God sends his sovle to fetch his bodye home"

== Works ==
Harborne wrote:

1. An account of his journey from Constantinople to London in 1588. Printed in Hakluyt's Collection of Voyages
2. The relation of my tenn yeares forraine travelle in procuring and establishing the intercourse into the Grand Seignor his domynions, begun in anno 1577 and fynished 1588, specifieng the service donn to hir Matie and Comon Wealth, with such perticuler proffet as the Traders thether have and doe enioye therebie, British Library Lansdowne MS 57, f. 65.
3. Many of his letters and documents relating to his embassy are preserved among the Lansdowne MSS in the British Library, and the Tanner MSS in the Bodleian Library at Oxford.

== Family ==
Harborne married Elizabeth, daughter of Anthony Drury of Besthorpe, Norfolk on 16 September 1589. They had several children:

- John, his son and heir.
- Elizabeth, who stayed in Mundham, she married Gregory Randall and had a daughter; Elizabeth, William's Granddaughter, who lived from 1629 to Jan 1652, and died in Mundham, at the age of 23.

== Notes ==
Diplomatic posts
Preceded by N/A	Ambassador to the Ottoman Empire; 20 November 1582 - August 1588	Succeeded by Sir Edward Barton
