= Inert waste =

Waste that doesn't undergo significant physical, chemical or biological changes

Inert waste is waste which is neither chemically nor biologically reactive and will not decompose or only very slowly. Examples of this are sand, concrete, and demolition waste. This has particular relevance to landfills as inert waste typically requires lower disposal fees than biodegradable waste or hazardous waste.

== See also ==
- Landfill
- List of waste types
