= Seething =

Village in Norfolk, England

Coordinates: 52.528°N 1.417°E

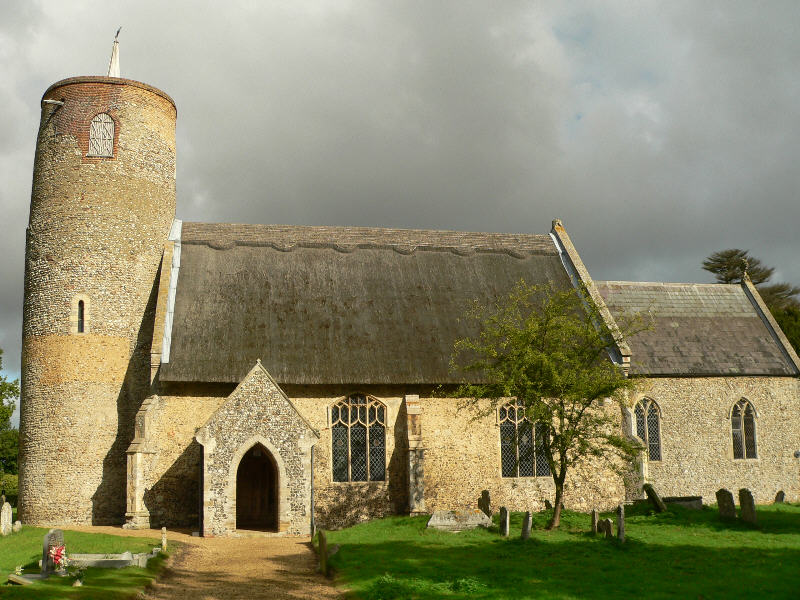
- Seething St Margaret

- Location within Norfolk
- Area: 6.78 km^{2} (2.62 sq mi)
- Population: 365
  - Density: 54/km^{2} (140/sq mi)
- OS grid reference: TM318977
- Civil parish: Seething
- District: South Norfolk
- Shire county: Norfolk
- Region: East
- Country: England
- Sovereign state: United Kingdom
- Post town: NORWICH
- Postcode district: NR15
- Dialling code: 01508
- UK Parliament: South Norfolk

Seething is a village and civil parish in the English county of Norfolk. It is around 8 1/2 miles (13.7 km) south-east of Norwich and 2 3/4 miles (4.4 km) west of Loddon in the South Norfolk district. Neighbouring parishes include Bergh Apton, Kirstead, Woodton, Hedenham and Mundham. The village lies to the west of the A146 Norwich to Lowestoft road and east of the B1332 Norwich to Bungay road.

The parish covers an area of 6.78 km^{2} (2.62 sq mi) and had a population of 341 in 141 households at the 2001 census, with the population increasing to 365 at the 2011 Census.

The parish church, which is dedicated to St Margaret and St Remigius, is one of 124 existing round-tower churches in Norfolk.

Seething Airfield, formerly RAF Seething, is to the south of the village. The area of the airfield is on the parish boundary, with most of the area of the current operation in the parish of Mundham. Seething Observatory, which is located on the airfield site, is within Mundham.
