= John de Hochepied Larpent, 7th Baron de Hochepied =

English aristocrat and diplomat

John James de Hochepied Larpent, 7th Baron de Hochepied (13 May 1783 – 8 June 1860) was an English aristocrat of Huguenot and Dutch descent who became a diplomat.

The title Baron de Hochepied, in the nobility of the Kingdom of Hungary had been granted to his Dutch diplomat ancestor by the Holy Roman Emperor in 1704, but was recognised by the English College of Arms.

== Early life ==
John was born as John James Larpent on 13 May 1783. He was the eldest son of John Larpent, inspector of plays, and the former Anna Margaretta Porter. He had two brothers, Sir George Gerard de Hochepied Larpent, 1st Baronet, MP for Nottingham, and Sir George de Hochepied Larpent. Among his half-siblings from his father's first marriage was Francis Seymour Larpent, Judge-Advocate General of the British Army.

His maternal grandparents were Sir James Porter, the British Ambassador to the Ottoman Empire, and the former Clarissa Catherine de Hochepied (a daughter of Elbert de Hochepied, 2nd Baron de Hochepied, the Dutch Ambassador to Constantinople).

== Career ==
For many years, de Hochepied Larpent served as Deputy Paymaster General of the British Army, and under the vice regal government of Hanover, was the British Consul at Antwerp from 1825 to 1839.

In 1819, Larpent and his younger brother, by Royal licence dated 1 June 1819, assumed the surname and arms of de Hochepied in addition to, and before, those of Larpent. Upon the death of his maternal uncle, George de Hochepied, 6th Baron de Hochepied (the longtime MP for Stockbridge), who died without issue in 1828, he inherited the barony of Hochepied. The title of Baron and Magnate was conferred on the family by letters patent of Leopold I, Emperor of Germany, under the great seal of the Kingdom of Hungary, given at Vienna, on 8 April 1704, on Daniel-John de Hochepied, with limitation to his issue, and by royal licence dated 27 September 1819, the family were authorised to avail themselves of the honour, and to bear the title in the United Kingdom.

== Personal life ==
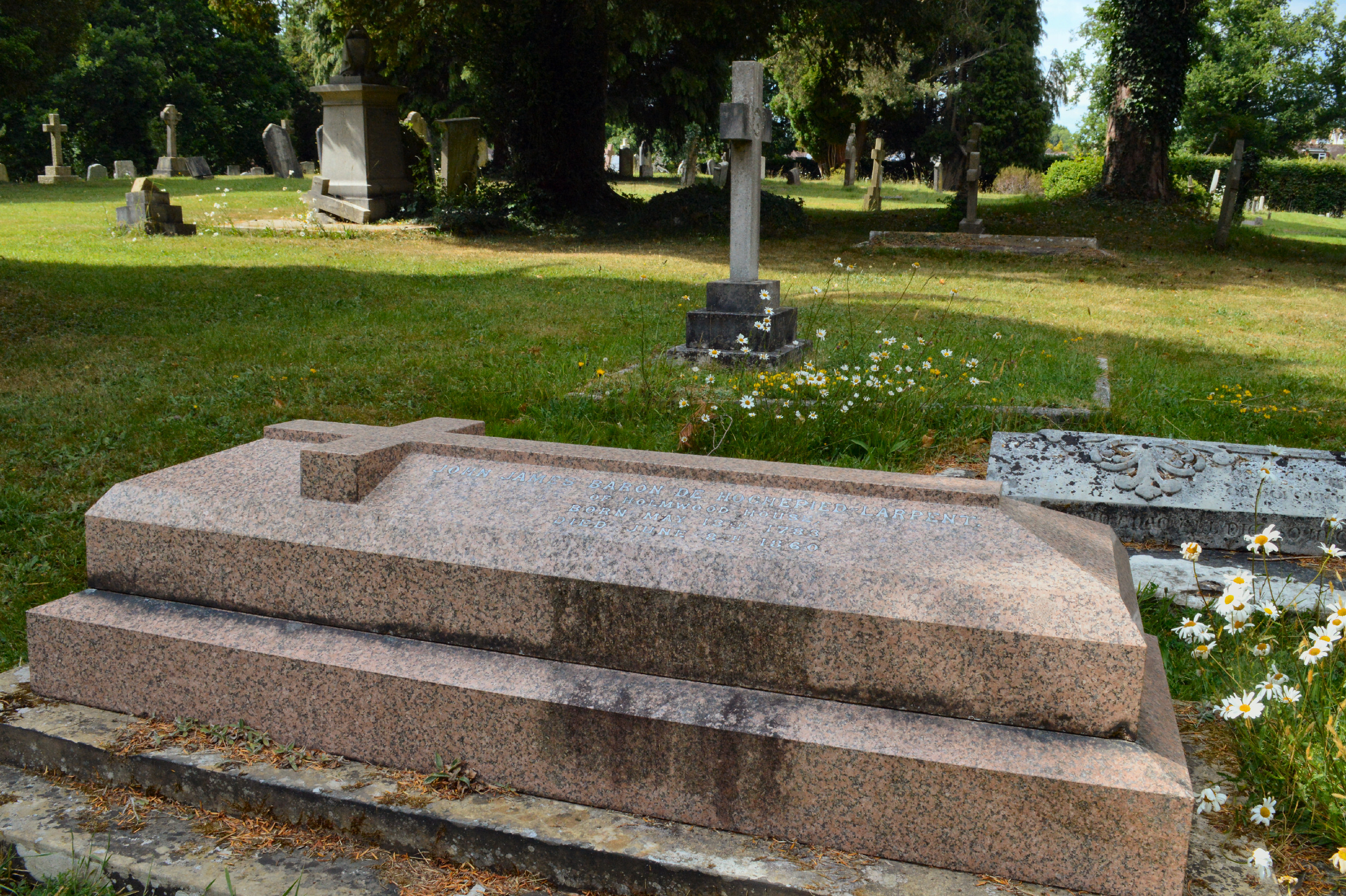
Lord de Hochepied's grave at South Holmwood, St Mary Magdalene

On 26 August 1826, he was married to Georgiana Frances Reeves (1801–1886), a daughter of Frederick Reeves, Esq. of East Sheen, Surrey. His elder half-brother Francis, had married Georgiana's sister, Catherine Elizabeth Reeves, in 1815 (although she died without issue in 1822). Together, they were the parents of ten children, of which five sons and three daughters survived to maturity:

- Clarissa Catherine de Hochepied Larpent (1830–1861), who married her cousin, the Rev. John Acland James, Vicar of Wattisham, only surviving son of the Rt. Rev. Thomas James, Bishop of Calcutta and Marianne Jane Reeves, in 1853.
- Arthur John de Hochepied Larpent, 8th Baron de Hochepied (1832–1887), who married Catherine Mary Melvill, a daughter of Maj. Gen. Sir Peter Melvill, in 1859.
- Louisa de Hochepied Larpent (b. 1833), who married William Alexander Ellerman, Esq., Hanoverian Consul-General in Belgium, in 1856.
- Lionel Henry Planta de Hochepied Larpent (1834–1907), a Maj.-Gen. in the Bengal Staff Corps; he married Annie Jane Peppé, a daughter of William Peppé, in 1874.
- Geraldine de Hochepied Larpent (b. 1836), who married Maj. Gen. Edwin Alexander Rowlatt of the Bengal Staff Corps, in 1877.
- George Porter de Hochepied Larpent (1839–1871), a Reverend who married Mary Harrison, youngest daughter of the Rev. Thomas T. Harrison, Rector of Thorpe Morieux, and sister of William Harrison, Bishop of Glasgow and Galloway.
- Egmont de Hochepied Larpent (1841–1879), who married Jane Ireton Smyth, eldest daughter of Henry Olliver Smyth, Esq. of Cloyne, Cork, in 1865.
- Frederick de Hochepied Larpent (1844–1919), who married Marion Helen Pearson, fifth daughter of Thomas Pearson, Esq., in 1866.

Lord de Hochepied died at his home, Holmwood House, near Dorking, Surrey, on 8 June 1860 and was succeeded in his titles and estates by his eldest son Arthur. His widow died on 30 October 1886.

=== Descendants ===
Through his eldest son Arthur, he was a grandfather of John Melvill de Hochepied Larpent, who became the 9th Baron de Hochepied in 1887.
