= Anna Larpent =

British diarist

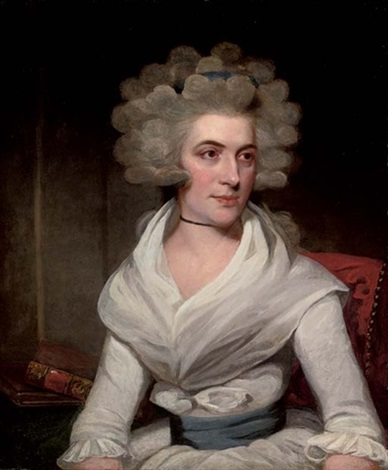
- Portrait of Anna, by Sir Martin Archer Shee
- Born: Anna Porter; 4 April 1758; Pera, Ottoman Empire
- Died: 4 March 1832 (aged 73); Putney Park House, London
- Spouse: John Larpent (m. 1782; died 1824)
- Children: John de Hochepied Larpent, 7th Baron de Hochepied; George Larpent, 1st Baronet
- Parent(s): James Porter; Clarissa Catherine de Hochepied
- Relatives: Elbert de Hochepied (grandfather); George de Hochepied, 6th Baron de Hochepied (brother)

Anna Larpent (née Porter) (4 April 1758 – 4 March 1832) was a British diarist. She was the de facto assistant Examiner of Plays, primarily reviewing the plays that were written in the Italian language. Her seventeen-volume diaries document 47 years of life in the Georgian era, covering the period from 1773 to 1830.

== Early life ==
Larpent was born in Pera in Turkey 1758 where her father was a British diplomat. She was the eldest of three surviving children born to Clarissa Catherine de Hochepied and James Porter, the British Ambassador to the Ottoman Empire. Her younger brother, Lt.-Gen. George Porter, was a Whig MP who married Henrietta Grosvenor (widow of Richard Grosvenor, 1st Earl Grosvenor and mother of the 1st Marquess Grosvenor).

Her father was the son of a Captain of Horse named La Roche who had adopted the name of Porter. Her maternal grandparents were Anna Margaretha Boelema and Elbert de Hochepied, 2nd Baron de Hochepied, the Dutch Ambassador to Constantinople).

Anna started her diary in 1773 and continued it in seventeen volumes over fifty-seven years to 1830.

== Career ==
When she was eighteen, Larpent published a 32 page account of the bigamy trial of Elizabeth Pierrepont, Duchess of Kingston-upon-Hull at Westminster Hall that gathered 4,000 spectators. The manuscript that was written by a woman for other women to read has been re-published as a historic source.

Her husband, John Larpent, was the Inspector of Plays serving as the single approver of plays that were to be performed in Britain. Following their marriage, Anna was the de facto assistant to him. When the plays were written in French or Italian then she had the skills to be comprehend them. She was fluent in Italian, where her husband had little knowledge. So she reviewed the plays that were written in Italian. Larpent was interested in her work and she was a fan of Elizabeth Inchbald.

== Marriage and children ==
On 25 April 1782 she married John Larpent, a widower who she hoped would care for her and younger sister Clara who she had adopted. From his first marriage, he was a father of Francis Seymour Larpent, who later served as Judge-Advocate General of the British Army. Together, they were the parents of two sons:

- John James de Hochepied Larpent (1783–1860), Consul at Antwerp who married Georgiana Frances Reeves, a daughter of Frederick Reeves, Esq. of East Sheen.
- George Gerard de Hochepied Larpent (1786–1855), an MP for Nottingham who was created a baronet in 1841.

Her husband died on 18 January 1824. On 25 March 1828, her eldest son succeeded her brother as Baron de Hochepied, the family's Hungarian title (which had been licensed to bear the title in England in 1819).

== Death ==
She died in London in 1832. Her diary is held at the Huntington Library.
