= Larpent =

Larpent may refer to:

- George Larpent (1786-1855), British businessman and politician
- John Larpent
- Larpent Baronets
- Larpent, Victoria, a locality in Australia
