= Arthur de Hochepied Larpent, 8th Baron de Hochepied =

English judge and landowner

Arthur John de Hochepied Larpent, 8th Baron de Hochepied (18 March 1832 – 24 August 1887) was an English judge and landowner of Huguenot and Dutch descent. The title Baron de Hochepied, in the nobility of the Kingdom of Hungary, had been granted to his Dutch diplomat ancestor by the Holy Roman Emperor in 1704, but was recognised by the English College of Arms.

== Early life ==
Arthur was born on 18 March 1832; his family lived at Holmwood House, near Dorking, Surrey. He was the eldest surviving son of Georgiana Frances (née Reeves) (1801–1886) and John de Hochepied Larpent, 7th Baron de Hochepied (1783–1860) His younger brother was Maj.-Gen. Lionel Henry Planta de Hochepied Larpent of the Bengal Staff Corps.

His maternal grandfather was Frederick Reeves, Esq. of East Sheen, Surrey. His paternal uncle Francis Seymour Larpent, married his mother's sister, Catherine Elizabeth Reeves, in 1815 (although she died without issue in 1822).

== Career ==
He served as a judge in Pune, India, in the Bengal Staff Corps.

In 1860, upon the death of his father, he inherited the family title and estates. The title of Baron and Magnate was conferred on the family by letters patent of Leopold I, Emperor of Germany, under the great seal of the Kingdom of Hungary, given at Vienna, at the 8th April 1704, on Daniel-John de Hochepied, with limitation to his issue, and by royal licence dated 27 September 1819, the family were authorised to avail themselves of the honour, and to bear the title in the United Kingdom. His father had inherited it from his grand-uncle, George de Hochepied, 6th Baron de Hochepied, the longtime MP for Stockbridge, who died without issue in 1828.

== Personal life ==
On 27 September 1859, he married Catherine Mary Melvill (d. 1872), a daughter of Maj. Gen. Sir Peter Melvill, a British military commander in the Bombay Army who was military and naval secretary to the Governor of Bombay. Together, they were the parents of:

- John Melvill de Hochepied Larpent, 9th Baron de Hochepied (1860–1903), who married Elizabeth Cowill Withycombe, daughter of George Withycombe of Dartmoor, in 1897.
- Clarissa Catherine de Hochepied-Larpent (b. 1862), who married the soldier and artist Robert Charles Goff in 1899.
- Georgiana Elizabeth de Hochepied-Larpent (1863–1923), who married Sir Francis Beaufort in 1898.
- Henrietta Kemble de Hochepied-Larpent (1865–1941), who married artist George Percy Jacomb-Hood, in 1910.
- Mary Louisa de Hochepied-Larpent (1867–1953)
- Sybil Marguerite Gonne de Hochepied-Larpent (1868–1941), who married philanthropist Philip Napier Miles in 1899.
- Beatrice Frances Charlotte de Hochepied-Larpent (1870–1942).

In May 1887, an auction was held by Chinnock, Galsworthy and Chinnock that sold a number of properties from his father's estate in London.

Lord de Hochepied died on 24 August 1887 at Keymer near Brighton. He was succeeded in his title and estates by his eldest son, John.

=== Descendants ===
Through his son John, he was a grandfather of Elbert Adrian William Melvill de Hochepied Larpent, 10th Baron de Hochepied (1900–1945), who married Camille Grey, daughter of John Frederick Grey.
