= Elbert de Hochepied =

Dutch diplomat (1706–1763)

The Baron de Hochepied

Dutch Ambassador to the Ottoman Empire
- In office 1747–1763
- Monarch: Mahmud I
- Prime Minister: William IV, Prince of Orange
- Preceded by: Cornelis Calkoen
- Succeeded by: Mathias van Asten

Personal details
- Born: 6 January 1706 Smyrna, Ottoman Empire
- Died: 11 February 1763 (aged 57) Pera, Ottoman Empire
- Spouse: Anna Margaretha Boelema (m. 1735; died 1756)
- Relations: Anna Larpent (granddaughter); George de Hochepied, 6th Baron de Hochepied (grandson)
- Children: Clarissa Catherine Porter; Gerard Johannes de Hochepied, 3rd Baron de Hochepied
- Parent(s): Clara Catharina Colyer; Daniël Johan de Hochepied

Elbert de Hochepied, 2nd Baron de Hochepied (6 January 1706 – 11 February 1763) was a Dutch politician and diplomat, who represented the Dutch Republic at the Sublime Porte.

== Early life ==
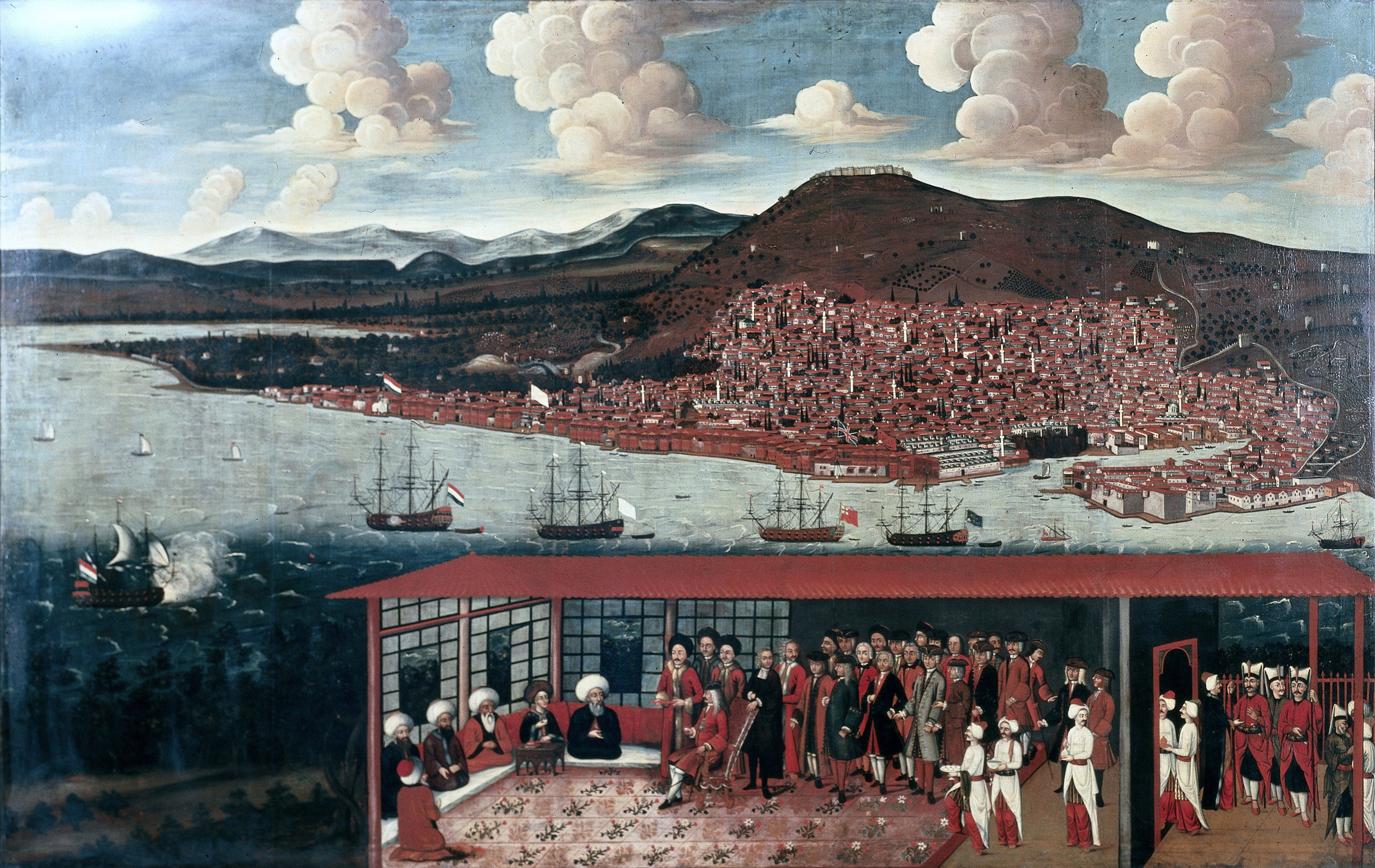
View of Smyrna with the reception of his father in the Divan in the foreground

Hochepied was born in Smyrna on 6 January 1706. He was the son of Clara Catharina Colyer (1657–1733) and Daniël Johan de Hochepied, 1st Baron de Hochepied (1657–1723), who was Dutch Consul at Smyrna, from 1688 to 1723. Among his siblings were Justinus Constantinus de Hochepied, Jacobus Byzantinus de Hochepied (who married Margarita Constantia van der Wielen), Daniël Alexander, Count de Hochepied (wife of Catherine Frémeaux), Petronella Jacoba de Hochepied (who married Gaspard de Fontenu), and Gertrude de Hochepied (wife of John Cooke, English Consul at Smyrna).

His maternal grandparents were Maria Engelbert and Justinus Colyer, the Dutch Ambassador to the Ottoman Empire from 1668 to 1782 (who was a half-brother to Sir Alexander Colyear, 1st Baronet). His uncle, Jacobus Colyer, was also the Dutch Ambassador to the Ottoman Empire. His paternal grandparents were Geertruyd Spiegel and silk merchant Jan Baptista Bathiste de Hochepied, burgher of Amsterdam. His uncle, Jan Baptista de Hochepied, married Agneta de Graeff, a daughter of Pieter de Graeff, republican minded aristocrat and Amsterdam regent, president-bewindhebber of the VOC and brother-in-law of Grand Pensionary Johan de Witt.

== Career ==
The title of Baron and Magnate was conferred on his father, with limitation to his issue, by letters patent of Leopold I, Holy Roman Emperor, under the great seal of the Kingdom of Hungary, given at Vienna, at the 8th April 1704.

In 1747, he succeeded Cornelis Calkoen to become the Dutch Ambassador to the Ottoman Empire. Hochepied served under stadtholders William IV (from 1747 to 1751) and William V (from 1751 to 1763) during the reign of sultans Mahmud I (from 1747 to 1754), Osman III (from 1754 to 1757), and Mustafa III (from 1757 to 1763).

== Personal life ==
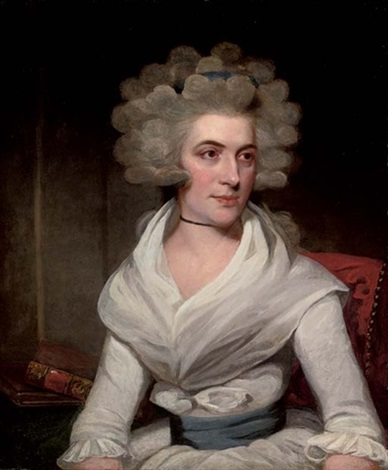
Portrait of his granddaughter, Anna Larpent, by Sir Martin Archer Shee

On 15 November 1735, Hochepied was married to Anna Margaretha Boelema (1715–1756) at Haarlem. She was the only daughter of Gerard Boelema, burgomaster of Haarlem, and Anna Craye. Together, they were the parents of:

- Clarissa Catherine de Hochepied (1736–c. 1765), who married Sir James Porter, the British Ambassador to the Ottoman Empire, in 1755.
- Gerard Johannes de Hochepied, 3rd Baron de Hochepied (1742–1779), who married Sarah-Anne Gerlacias, daughter of John-Hermann Gerlacias.

Anna died on 12 September 1756. Hochepied died at Pera on 11 February 1763.

=== Descendants ===
Through his son Gerard, he was a grandfather of Adrian William Elbert de Hochepied, 4th Baron de Hochepied (1780–1817), who died unmarried at the Hague and was succeeded by his brother, Hugo Balthazar de Hochepied, 5th Baron de Hochepied (1787–1819), who also died unmarried at the Hague. The title reverted, under the limitation of the letters patent, to his first cousin, George Porter.

Through his daughter Clarissa, he was a grandfather of Anna Porter (1758–1832) (Note: From her marriage to John Larpent, Anna was mother to John de Hochepied Larpent, 7th Baron de Hochepied (1783–1860), Consul at Antwerp, and George Gerard de Hochepied Larpent (1786–1855), an MP for Nottingham who was created a baronet in 1841.) and George de Hochepied, 6th Baron de Hochepied (1760–1828). (Note: In 1802, George de Hochepied, 6th Baron de Hochepied married his longtime companion, Henrietta, Lady Grosvenor, the widow of the recently deceased, Richard Grosvenor, 1st Earl Grosvenor, she was the daughter of Henry Vernon of Hilton Park, and Lady Henrietta Wentworth (a daughter of Thomas Wentworth, 1st Earl of Strafford).)
