= George de Hochepied, 6th Baron de Hochepied =

English soldier and Whig politician

Baron de Hochepied
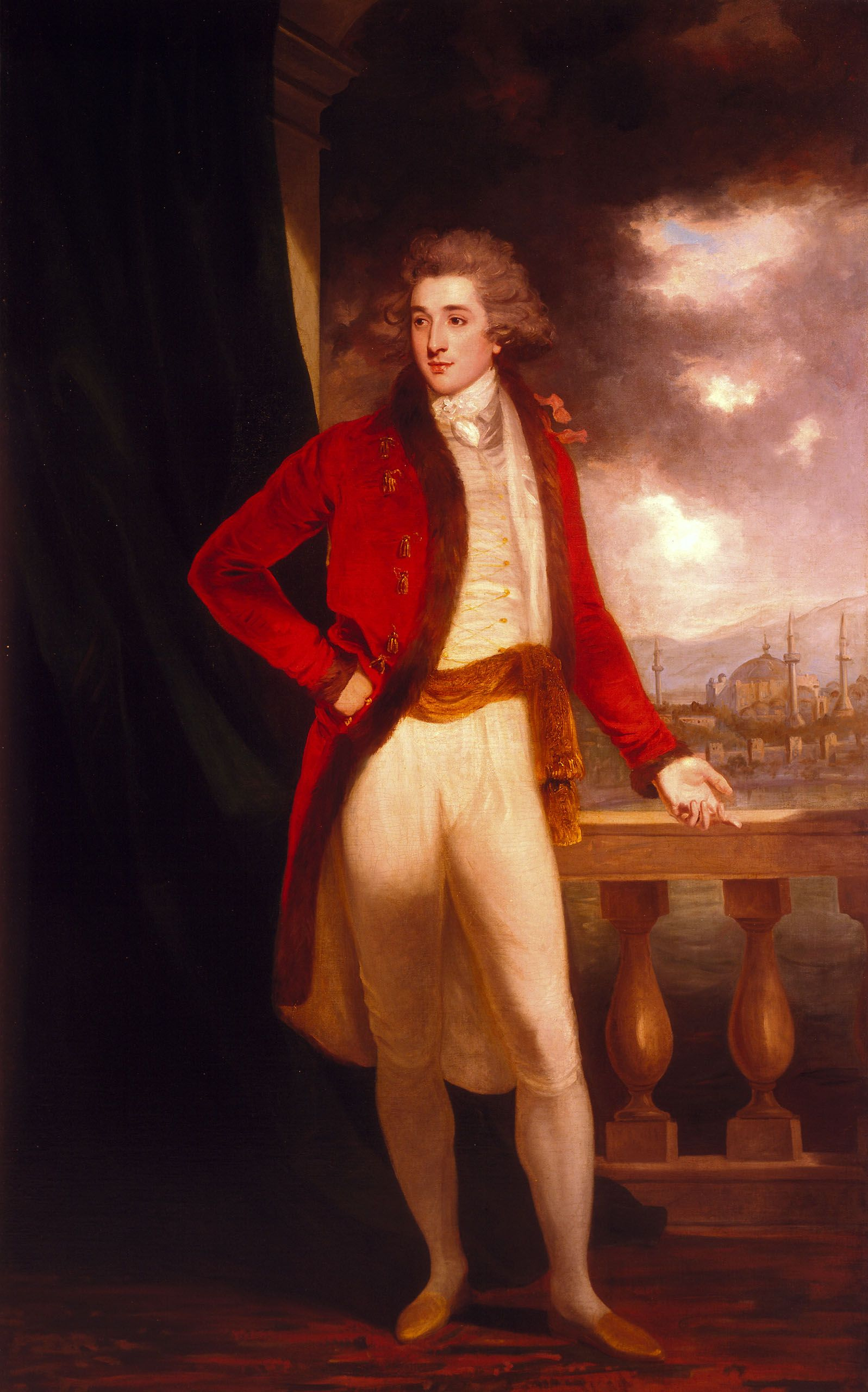
- Portrait of Capt. Porter by John Hoppner, 1789

Member of Parliament for Stockbridge
- In office 1793–1820 Serving with John Foster-Barham, John Agnew, Sir John Leicester
- Preceded by: John Scott; John Cator
- Succeeded by: John Foster Barham; Joseph Foster Barham

Personal details
- Born: George Porter; 23 April 1760 Pera, Ottoman Empire
- Died: 25 March 1828 (aged 67) Adur Lodge, Sussex, England
- Party: Whig
- Spouse: Henrietta Grosvenor (m. 1802; died 1828)
- Relations: Anna Larpent (sister); George Larpent (nephew)
- Parent(s): James Porter; Clarissa Catherine de Hochepied

George de Hochepied, 6th Baron de Hochepied (né Porter) (23 April 1760 – 25 March 1828) was an English soldier and Whig politician.

The title Baron de Hochepied, in the nobility of the Kingdom of Hungary, had been granted to his Dutch diplomat ancestor by the Holy Roman Emperor in 1704, but was recognised by the English College of Arms.

== Early life ==
George Porter was born on 23 April 1760 at Pera in the Ottoman Empire. He was the only surviving son of Sir James Porter, the British Ambassador to the Ottoman Empire, and the former Clarissa Catherine de Hochepied. His elder sister, Anna Porter, was the wife of inspector of plays John Larpent.

His maternal grandfather, Elbert de Hochepied, 2nd Baron de Hochepied, was the Dutch Ambassador to Constantinople.

== Career ==
While a captain in the British Army on half-pay, Porter joined the Whig club on 26 June 1784 and then Brooks's on 15 February 1786. In 1790 he contested Stockbridge in coalition with West Indies merchant Joseph Foster Barham, and after "exposing the corruption that had secured their opponents' return and strengthening their interest there," obtaining the seats on petition, on 22 February 1793.

=== Military career ===
Porter was a Cornet in the 4th Dragoons in 1777; then a sub-brigadier and cornet of the 1st Horse Guards in 1780, Brigadier and Lieutenant in 1781. In 1783, he became Captain (half-pay) of the 89th Foot. He was brevetted Major in 1794 before becoming Lieutenant colonel of the 117th Regiment of Foot in 1794. He retired on full pay in 1795, half-pay in 1798. He was brevetted Colonel in 1800 before serving as Brigadier-general for the Portsmouth district from 1803 to 1813. He was Captain-commandant of the Stockbridge volunteers in 1803, Lt.-Col. Commdandant in 1804, Major-general in 1808, Colonel of the 2nd Garrison Battalion and Lieutenant-general in 1813, and Colonel of the 103rd Foot from 1814 to 1817.

== Personal life ==
He succeeded to his father's estate upon his death in 1776. Upon the death of his cousin, Hugo Balthazar de Hochepied, 5th Baron de Hochepied, on 6 February 1819, he gained the title of 6th Baron de Hochepied. On 6 May 1819, his name was legally changed to George de Hochepied by Royal Licence. In September 1819, George, his nephews, and their issues male, were granted a Royal Licence to bear the title of Baron de Hochepied.

On 15 September 1802, he married his longtime companion, Henrietta, Lady Grosvenor at Shoreham. The widow of the recently deceased, Richard Grosvenor, 1st Earl Grosvenor, she was the daughter of Henry Vernon of Hilton Park, and Lady Henrietta Wentworth (a daughter of Thomas Wentworth, 1st Earl of Strafford).

His wife died on 2 January 1828. Baron de Hochepied, who lived at Adur Lodge, Sussex, died without issue on 25 March 1828. His library was sold by the London auctioneer R. H. Evans (6-11 May 1822), and a copy of the catalogue is at Cambridge University Library (shelfmark Munby.c.124(11)). He was succeeded in the barony by his nephew, John James Larpent, who took the surname de Hochepied.

Parliament of the United Kingdom
Preceded by John Scott; John Cator	Member of Parliament for Stockbridge; 1793–1820; With: John Foster-Barham (1793–1799); John Agnew (1799–1802); John Foster-Barham (1802–1807); Sir John Leicester (1807–1807); John Foster-Barham (1807–1820)	Succeeded by John Foster Barham; Joseph Foster Barham
