= Robert Goff =

Robert Goff may refer to:

- Robert Goff, Baron Goff of Chieveley (1926–2016), British judge
- Robert Goff (American football) (born 1965), American football player
- Robert Charles Goff (1837–1922), printmaker and painter
