= Stanhope Aspinwall =

British diplomat (1713–1771)

Stanhope Aspinwall (born 5 July 1713 in Liverpool, England and died on 17 January 1771) was a British diplomat. He was born to Richard Aspinwall and his wife Elizabeth Stanhope, the great granddaughter of Philip Stanhope, 1st Earl of Chesterfield, the granddaughter of Arthur Stanhope and daughter of Charles Stanhope.

Stanhope Aspinwall was educated at Westminster School from 1722 until at least 1725.

From November 1742 Aspinwall was stationed at Constantinople in the British Embassy to the Ottoman Empire. In his will dated 14 April 1747, he describes himself as 'Chancellor and Secretary of the British Embassy at Constantinople', and under Everard Fawkener, until February 1747 Chargé d'affaires to the Levant Company's embassy. Apparently Fawkener had left the Embassy in a disgruntled state, purportedly for personal reasons. Without an appropriate royal commission, Aspinwall served until the arrival of Sir James Porter

On 8 August 1752, George II appointed Stanhope Aspinwall as his agent and consul general to Algiers. His last appointment was as secretary to Simon Harcourt, 1st Earl Harcourt, Ambassador to France, which position Aspinwall was holding when he died on 17 January 1771.

Stanhope Aspinwall’s will dated 14 April 1747 shows that he was married to ‘Magdalena’ (other name ‘Baptistina’) and that he then had two children. One of them Elizabeth later married Sir William Neville Hart. Two daughters Cecilia Frances and Margaret Catherine were baptised at St Marylebone Parish Church in London in 1751 and 1754 respectively, both presumably born after Aspinwall left Constantinople. Magdalena survived him. On 21 May 1771, in the Prerogative Court of Canterbury, Administration (with the Will annexed) were granted to her.

Stanhope Aspinwall also translated from French into English Rodogune, or, The rival brothers: a tragedy by Pierre Corneille (1606–1684), It was published in London in 1765.

== Notes ==
Diplomatic posts
Preceded by Everard Fawkener, Ambassador 1737-1746 (departed 1742)	British Chargé d'affaires to the Ottoman Empire; 1742–1746	Succeeded by Sir James Porter, Ambassador 1746-1762
