= Jacobus Colyer =

Dutch diplomat (1657–1725)

Dutch Ambassador to the Ottoman Empire
- In office 1688–1698
- Monarch: Mehmed IV
- Prime Minister: William III
- Preceded by: Justinus Colyer
- Succeeded by: Coenraad van Heemskerck

Personal details
- Born: 18 February 1657
- Died: 6 March 1725 (aged 68) Pera, Ottoman Empire
- Spouse: Catharina de Bourg
- Relations: Elbert de Hochepied (nephew)
- Parent(s): Justinus Colyer; Maria Engelbert

Jacobus Colyer (c. 18 February 1657 – 6 March 1725) was a Dutch politician and diplomat, who represented the Dutch Republic at the Sublime Porte.

== Early life ==
Colyer was born before 18 February 1657. He was the eldest son of Justinus Colyer and Maria Engelbert. His sister, Clara Catharina Colyer, married Daniël Johan de Hochepied, the Dutch Consul at Smyrna, from 1688 to 1723, who was created Magnate and Baron de Hochepied in 1704 by Leopold I, Emperor of Germany, under the great seal of the Kingdom of Hungary.

His nephew, Elbert de Hochepied, 2nd Baron de Hochepied, also served as the Dutch ambassador to the Ottoman Empire from 1747 to 1763.

== Career ==
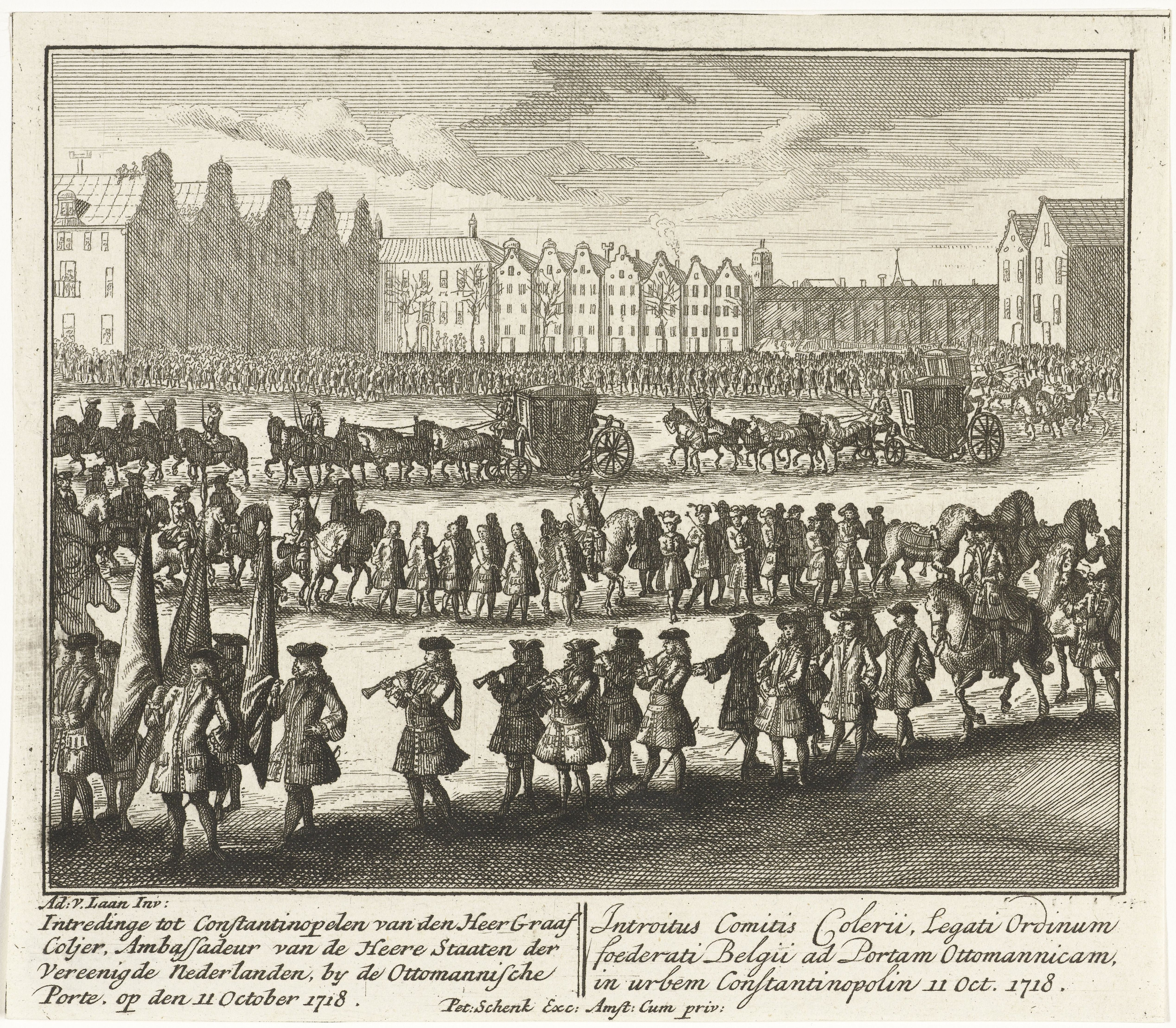
Arrival of the Colyer in Constantinople, 1718.

Colyer's father, who became ambassador in 1668, was only the second official Dutch ambassador in Constantinople because the Dutch declined to appoint an official successor when Cornelius Haga down in 1639. (Note: Between 1639 and 1668, several Dutch diplomats resided in Constantinople, but none were granted the official position of ambassador.) In the fall of 1682, the elder Colyer installed Jacobus as the secretary and treasurer of the Dutch residence in Constantinople. Shortly after his father's death in 1688, Colyer sent a letter to Gaspar Fagel, the secretary of the States General, successfully arguing that his appointment as successor ambassador, which came in 1688, came with less financial costs than appointing an entirely new ambassador.

He was then he became only the third Dutch Ambassador to the Ottoman Empire. Colyer served until 1692 under stadtholder William III (who became King of England, Ireland, and Scotland in 1689) during the reign of sultan Mehmed IV.

=== Treaty of Karlowitz ===
Starting in November 1698, Colyer traveled to Karlowitz, the Military Frontier of Archduchy of Austria (present-day Sremski Karlovci, Serbia), where he was instrumental in negotiating, as a neutral intermediary, the Treaty of Karlowitz. The treat, signed on 26 January 1699, concluded the Great Turkish War in which the Ottoman Empire was defeated by the Holy League at the Battle of Zenta. The Treaty marked the end of Ottoman control in much of Central Europe, with their first major territorial losses, beginning the reversal of four centuries of expansion, and established the Habsburg monarchy as the dominant power of the region.

In gratitude for his efforts, he was created a Count of the Holy Roman Empire and was granted the title Duke of Hungary by the Habsburg King Leopold I in 1699.

=== Treaty of Passarowitz ===
After war resumed again in the early 18th century, Colyer was asked to return to Serbia for a second time in 1718 to broker yet another peace, known as the Treaty of Passarowitz between the Ottoman Empire and Austria of the Habsburg monarchy and the Republic of Venice. The treaty, signed in Požarevac on 21 July 1718, which saw the cession of several Ottoman territories to the Habsburgs, and, at the time, was regarded as an extraordinary success and source of pride in Vienna.

== Personal life ==
In 1713 Colyer married Catharina de Bourg.

Colyer died at Pera on 6 March 1725.
