= George Larpent =

British businessman (1786–1855)

The Right Honourable Sir George de Hochepied Larpent, Bt

Member of Parliament for Nottingham
- In office 1841–1842 Serving with Sir John Hobhouse, Bt
- Preceded by: John Walter; Sir John Hobhouse, Bt
- Succeeded by: John Walter; Sir John Hobhouse, Bt

Personal details
- Born: George Gerard Larpent; 16 February 1786; London, England
- Died: 8 March 1855 (aged 69)
- Spouses: Charlotte Cracroft (m. 1813; died 1851) Louisa Martha Bailey (m. 1852)
- Relations: John de Hochepied Larpent, 7th Baron de Hochepied (brother); Francis Seymour Larpent (half-brother); James Porter (grandfather)
- Parent(s): John Larpent; Anna Margaretta Porter

Sir George Gerard de Hochepied Larpent, 1st Baronet (16 February 1786 – 8 March 1855) was a British businessman of Huguenot and Dutch descent and a Liberal Party politician.

== Early life ==
Larpent born in London. At that time he added de Hochepied to his family name, Larpent. He was made a British baronet in 1841. His father was John Larpent, the inspector of plays. His mother, Anna Margaretta Porter, assisted in this work. She kept a journal for most of her life which is now in the Huntington Library. His elder brother, John James Larpent, inherited the Hungarian title of Baron de Hochpied, through his mother's line, upon the death of their uncle, George de Hochepied, 6th Baron de Hochepied, in 1828.

His maternal grandparents were Sir James Porter, the British Ambassador to the Ottoman Empire, and the former Clarissa Catherine de Hochepied (a daughter of Elbert de Hochepied, 2nd Baron de Hochepied, the Dutch Ambassador to Constantinople).

== Career ==
He was involved with trade to India, entering the East India house of Cockerell & Larpent, before becoming chairman of the Oriental and China Association, and was deputy chairman of the St. Katherine's Dock company. Larpent stood unsuccessfully for Parliament at a by-election in May 1840 for Ludlow He was unsuccessful again at a by-election in April 1841 for Nottingham but at the general election in June 1841, just prior to becoming a baronet in August, he won the seat. However, he served little more than a year as a Member of Parliament (MP) for Nottingham; he resigned from Parliament in May 1842. At the 1847 general election he stood in the City of London, where he fell just three votes short of winning the fourth seat.

In 1847 he was Chairman of 'a Committee for promoting the extension of Steam Navigation to Australia and New Zealand', which also included the pioneer of the 'overland route' to the East, Lt. Thomas Waghorn, and another would-be improver of routes to the East, Henry Wise.

He edited the Peninsular War journal of his half-brother, Francis Seymour Larpent, and a History of Turkey from papers left by his grandfather, Sir James Porter.

== Personal life ==
Sir George was twice married. On 13 October 1813, he married Charlotte Cracroft, a daughter of William Cracroft of the Exchequer Office, and Elizabeth Sewell Hawkes. Before her death on 18 February 1851, they were the parents of:

- Sir Albert John Larpent, 2nd Baronet (1816–1861), who married Catherine Lydia Shaw, daughter of Major Lewis Simeon Shaw, of the Bengal Staff Corps, in 1838.
- Anna Catherine de Hochepied Larpent (1819–1893), who married the Rev. Edward Aislabie Ommanney, Prebendary of Wells Cathedral and eldest son of Sir Francis Ommanney, in 1841.
- Frederick Seymour de Hochepied Larpent (1822–1846), who died unmarried.

On 17 July 1852, he married Louisa Martha Bailey, daughter of George Bailey of Windsor. Before her death on 23 March 1856, they were the parents of two children who died in infancy.

Sir George died on 8 March 1855, and was succeeded in the baronetcy by his eldest son, Albert.

=== Legacy ===
In Lady Larpent's garden at Roehampton, Hampshire, Ceratostigma plumbaginoides was first successfully flowered in England; it was at first given the name Plumbago larpentae, "Lady Larpent's Plumbago".

His grandson, George Albert Larpent, the third and last baronet who fought in the Kaffir War, committed suicide in 1899 after which the baronetcy became extinct.

Parliament of the United Kingdom
Preceded by John Walter; Sir John Hobhouse, Bt	Member of Parliament for Nottingham; 1841–1842; With: Sir John Hobhouse, Bt	Succeeded by John Walter; Sir John Hobhouse, Bt
Baronetage of the United Kingdom
New creation	Baronet (of Roehampton); 1841–1855	Succeeded by Albert John Larpent
