= Justinus Colyer =

Dutch diplomat (1624–1682)

Dutch Ambassador to the Ottoman Empire
- In office 1668–1682
- Monarch: Mehmed IV
- Prime Minister: Johan de Witt
- Preceded by: Joris Croock (as Minister)
- Succeeded by: Jacobus Colyer

Personal details
- Born: c. 1624 The Hague, The Netherlands
- Died: 28 December 1682 (aged 57–58) Pera, Ottoman Empire
- Spouse: Maria Engelbert
- Relations: Elbert de Hochepied (grandson)
- Children: Jacobus Colyer; Clara Catharina, Baroness de Hochepied

Justinus Colyer (c. 1624 – 28 December 1682) was a Dutch politician and diplomat, who represented the Dutch Republic at the Sublime Porte.

== Early life ==
Colyer was born in The Hague, in the Netherlands around 1624. He was the son of David Robertson (also known as Colyer) (Note: The family's surname has alternately been spelled Colyer, Colyear, Coljer, Collier or Colier, Coleyer and Cauleyer.) and Clara van der Poll. After his mother's death, his father married Jean Bruce (a daughter of John Bruce of Airth and Margaret Elphinstone). From his father's second marriage, he had a younger-half brother, Sir Alexander Colyear, 1st Baronet (father of David Colyear, 1st Earl of Portmore).

His maternal grandparents were Cornelis van der Poll and Cornelia de Bije. His paternal grandparents were Helen and Jacobus Colyear (who assumed the surname Robertson and were said to be cadets of the House of Robertson of Struan).

== Career ==
Colyer was named ambassador to the Ottoman Empire in 1668, only the second official Dutch ambassador in Constantinople because the Dutch declined to appoint an official successor when Cornelius Haga down in 1639. Between 1639 and 1668, several Dutch diplomats resided in Constantinople, but none were granted the official position of ambassador.

In the fall of 1682, Colyer installed his eldest son Jacobus as the secretary and treasurer of the Dutch residence in Constantinople. Shortly after his death in 1688, his son sent a letter to Gaspar Fagel, the secretary of the States General, successfully arguing that he should be appointed as successor ambassador as his appointment would come with less financial costs than appointing an entirely new ambassador.

== Personal life ==
Colyer was married to Maria Engelbert. Together, they were the parents of:

- Jacobus Colyer (1657–1725), who married Catharina de Bourg in 1713.
- Clara Catharina Colyer (1662–1733), married Daniël Johan de Hochepied, the Dutch Consul at Smyrna, from 1688 to 1723, who was created Magnate and Baron de Hochepied in 1704 by Leopold I, Emperor of Germany, under the great seal of the Kingdom of Hungary.

Colyer died at Pera on 28 December 1682.

=== Descendants ===
Through his daughter Clara, he was a grandfather of Elbert de Hochepied, 2nd Baron de Hochepied, who also served as the Dutch ambassador to the Ottoman Empire from 1747 to 1763.
