= Robert Charles Goff =

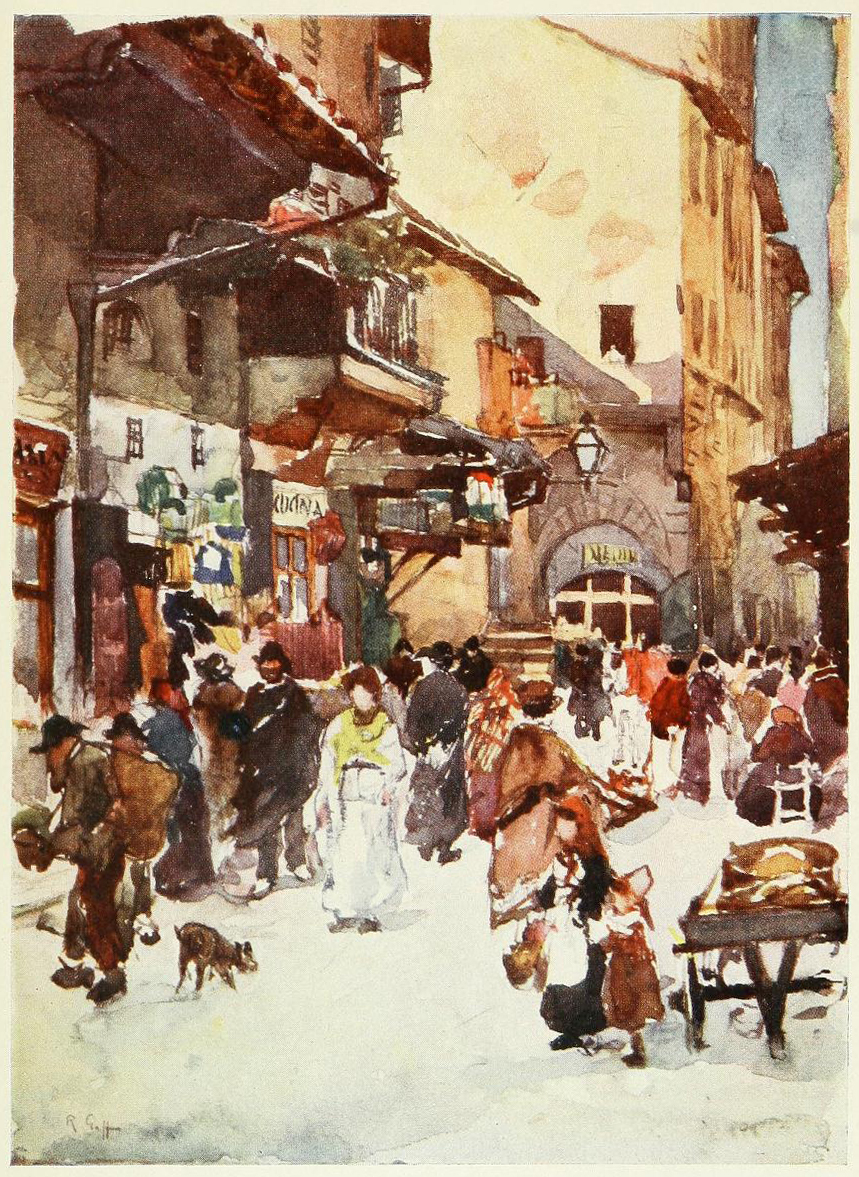
Study in the mercato vecchio of Florence in the year 1884. Watercolour, reproduced in Florence & some Tuscan cities Painted by Colonel R. C. Goff · Described by Clarissa Goff (London: A. & C. Black, 1905

Robert Charles Goff (1837–1922) was a printmaker and painter who specialised in topographical scenes. As an etcher he was strongly influenced by the work of James McNeill Whistler.

Born in Ireland, he obtained a commission in the 50th Queen's Own Regiment just before his eighteenth birthday. He fought in the Crimean War and became adjutant of his regiment before going to Ceylon and then transferring to the 15th Foot then the Coldstream Guards.

Having achieved the rank of colonel, he retired from the Coldstream Guards in 1878 to concentrate on his art work, having learned etching from a fellow officer. He was elected Fellow of the Royal Society of Painter-Etchers and Engravers in 1887.

In 1877 he married Beatrice Teresa Testaferrata-Abela, daughter of Baron Testaferrata-Abela of Malta and had a son, Francis who died in 1891. His wife also died and in 1899 he remarried The Hon Clarissa Catherine de Hochepied-Larpent, daughter of Arthur de Hochepied Larpent, 8th Baron de Hochepied, and thus became brother-in-law of his friends Philip Napier Miles and George Percy Jacomb-Hood.

Goff lived in London and Brighton but travelled extensively. He moved in the 1890s to a villa overlooking Florence and he and his second wife wrote about the area. He then moved during the First World War to Villa Valerie, Bellaria, La Tour-de-Peilz, Switzerland where he died in 1922.

Brighton and Hove Museum and Art Gallery hold a large collection of Goff's work. In 2011 art historian Alexandra Loske researched this collection in preparation for an exhibition of Goff's work at the museum's Prints and Drawings Gallery: Robert Goff: An Etcher in the Wake of Whistler (29 November 2011 to 29 April 2012). The exhibition comprised approx. 50 works by Goff, mostly etchings and some other works on paper. On display were local views of Brighton, Hove and Sussex, as well as pictures from his travels in other parts of Britain, Italy, Egypt and Japan.
