= James Porter (diplomat) =

British diplomat

Sir James Porter FRS
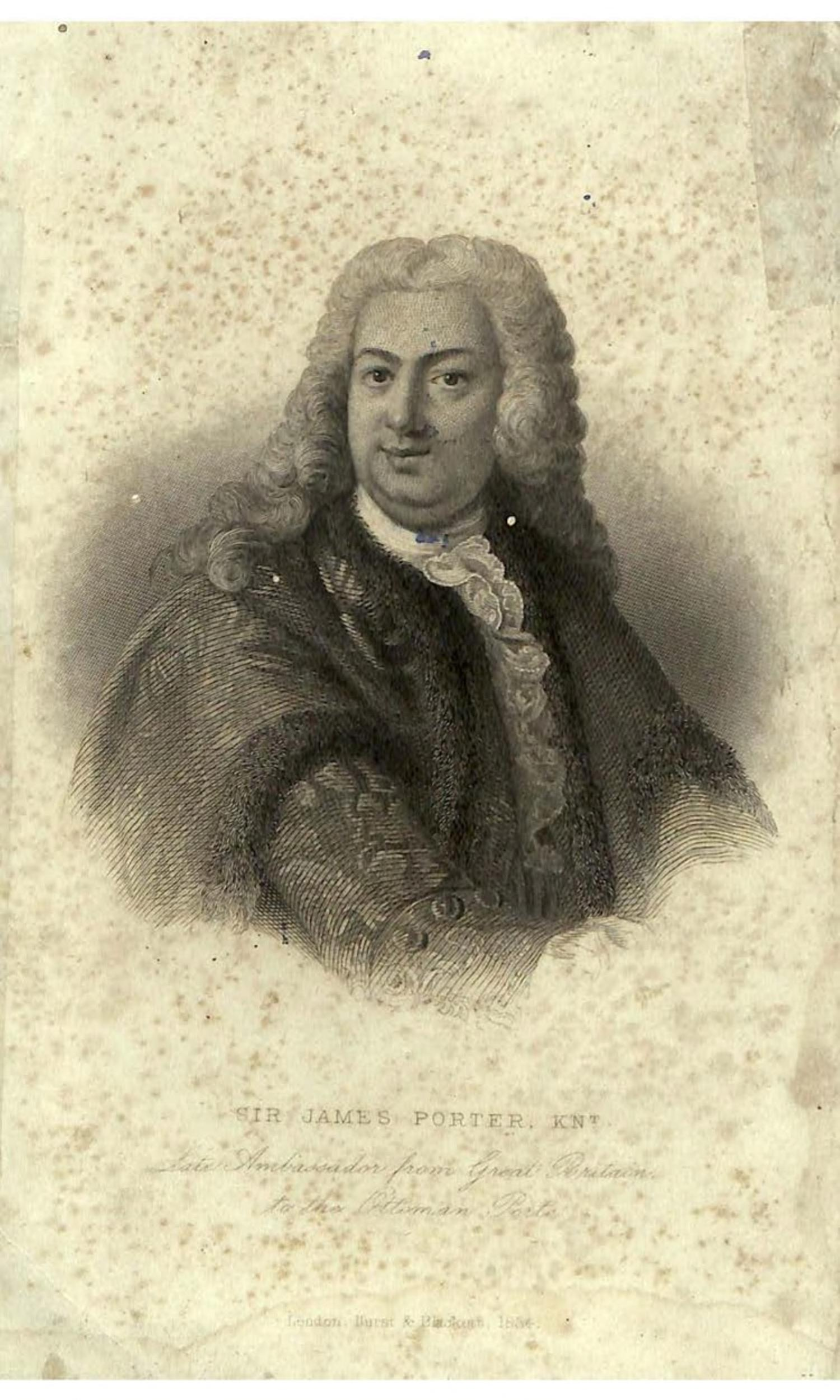

British Envoy to the Imperial Court at Brussels
- In office 1763–1765
- Preceded by: Diplomatic Relations broken off due to Seven Years' War
- Succeeded by: William Gordon

British Minister to the Ottoman Empire
- In office 1747–1762
- Preceded by: Stanhope Aspinwall
- Succeeded by: Henry Grenville

Personal details
- Born: 1710 Dublin, Ireland
- Died: December 1776 (aged 65–66) Central London
- Spouse(s): Clarissa Catherine de Hochepied; 11 October 1755 (m. 1765, died)
- Relations: George Larpent (grandson)
- Children: Anna Larpent; George de Hochepied, 6th Baron de Hochepied; Clara Porter
- Occupation: Diplomat

Sir James Porter FRS (1710 – December 1776) was a British diplomat. He wrote papers on astronomy and geology and was a member of the Royal Society.

== Life ==
Porter was born in 1710 in Dublin, Ireland. He was the son of a Captain of Horse named La Roche who had adopted the name of Porter. James was apprenticed to a business house in London and studied mathematics in his spare time.

== Career ==
He was a business associate of Lord Carteret, and in 1741 joined the staff of the English embassy to Austria at Vienna. Carteret's sympathies were entirely with Maria Theresa of Austria, mainly on the ground that the fall of the house of Austria would dangerously increase the power of France.

Porter then became British ambassador to the Sublime Porte of the Ottoman Empire in Istanbul. Appointed on 4 October 1746, he arrived in Constantinople on 11 February 1747. After his time there he would write his Observations on the religion, law, government, and manners, of the Turks. For Henry Laurens, the translation of Observations marked, in France, a break in the despotism narrative initiated by Montesquieu and Turgot. He sees James Porter as one of the last to praise the efficiency of the Ottoman Empire before the decline.

Porter's appointment stemmed from his connections with Carteret, Sir Thomas Robinson, ambassador in Vienna, and Mr Amyand of the Levant Company of merchants in Constantinople. A self-educated man of science, during his time in Constantinople he wrote papers on astronomy and geology, as well as publishing his memoirs, a detailed and comprehensive description of life in Turkey. He was recalled at his own request on 1 May 1761 and left Constantinople on 24 May. He was elected a Fellow of the Royal Society in 1749.

Porter then became British minister in Brussels in 1762 but, finding the lifestyle there too expensive, resigned his position in 1765 and retired to Richmond, near London, where his associates included a friend from his travels in Turkey, Lord Bessborough. He was knighted in 1763.

== Personal life ==
On 11 October 1755 Porter was married to Clarissa Catherine de Hochepied (1736–c. 1765) at Pera in Turkey. The eldest daughter of Anna Margaretha Boelema and Elbert de Hochepied, 2nd Baron de Hochepied, the Dutch Ambassador to Constantinople, the de Hochepied family were a dynasty of Dutch diplomats. Together, they were the parents of five children, three of whom survived childhood, including:

- Anna Margaretta Porter (1758–1832), who is known today because of the seventeen volume daily diary that she kept from 1773 to 1830; she married John Larpent.
- George Porter (1760–1828), a Lieutenant-General and Whig MP who married Henrietta Grosvenor, widow of Richard Grosvenor, 1st Earl Grosvenor and mother of the 1st Marquess Grosvenor.
- Clara Porter, who was adopted by her elder sister.

Porter died at his home in Great Marlborough Street on 9 December 1776. Upon the death of his brother-in-law, Gerard Johannes de Hochepied, 5th Baron de Hochepied, his son George became Baron de Hochepied, Baron and Magnat of Hungary and, in September 1819, was granted a Royal Licence to bear the title of baron de Hochepied.

Diplomatic posts
Preceded by Stanhope Aspinwall	British Minister to the Ottoman Empire; 1747–1762	Succeeded by Henry Grenville
Preceded by Diplomatic Relations broken off due to Seven Years' War	British Minister in Brussels; 1763–1765	Succeeded by William Gordon
