= Philip Napier Miles =

English peer and politician

High Sheriff of Gloucestershire
- In office 1916–1917

Personal details
- Born: 21 January 1865
- Died: 19 July 1935 (aged 70)
- Spouse: Sybil de Hochepied-Larpent (m. 1899)
- Parent: Philip William Skynner Miles (father)
- Relatives: Philip John Miles (grandfather); William Francis Patrick Napier (grandfather)
- Education: Oriel College, Oxford,

Philip Napier Miles JP (21 January 1865 – 19 July 1935) was a philanthropist and musician in Bristol, and a descendant of the Napier family. He was High Sheriff of Gloucestershire for 1916–17.

== Life and family ==
He was the only son of Philip William Skynner Miles (1816–1881) and Pamela Adelaide Napier. His father was a promoter and developer of the docks at Avonmouth and the eldest son of Philip John Miles and Clarissa Peach, and his mother was the daughter of General Sir William Francis Patrick Napier. He was educated at Harrow School and Oriel College, Oxford. Like his family, he was a social and political conservative. Miles married Sybil Marguerite Gonne, OBE, daughter of Arthur de Hochepied Larpent, 8th Baron de Hochepied, in 1899, but died childless. His ashes were buried at Henbury parish church, and his grave is marked by the family motto, "Labora siccut bonus miles" ("Work like a good soldier"), a pun on their surname. He is commemorated in the name of Napier Miles Road, leading to the gate of Kingsweston.

Upon his death, his Kingsweston estate, more than 9,000 acres (36 km^{2}), was sold off. His will's Grant of Probate showed that, even after his philanthropic gifts, his personal estate was worth £286,422 11s 4d (equivalent to £25,114,313 in 2023). His cousin William StJohn Fenton Miles, Director of the National Provincial Bank, was among the executors of his will.

His relations included his half-uncle, Sir William Miles, 1st Baronet; half-cousin Sir Philip John William Miles, 2nd Baronet; and cousins Frank Miles, Robert Miles and Charles Granville Bruce. Through his marriage, he was brother-in-law of Colonel Robert Charles Goff and George Percy Jacomb-Hood.

== Philanthropy ==
The area around Kingsweston was the main focus of Miles' philanthropic activity. This included donations of land for the Shirehampton Public Hall in 1903, now a grade II listed building, and to the National Trust in 1918, as well as for various local schools, churches, and sporting activities including cricket and golf. In 1930 he gave land at Sea Mills for homes for World War I veterans, and established covenants intended only for relatively low-density housing, in line with the ideals of the garden city movement of the time.

== Music ==
Miles was the last squire of Kingsweston and was active in the local music community in the early part of the 20th century. He studied in post-Wagnerian Dresden under Hubert Parry and became a minor composer, gaining modest recognition for his small output. He wrote six operas, three of which remain unperformed and four unpublished. His other works included a sonata for violin and piano; a fantasia on two Elizabethan themes (by Thomas Weelkes and Thomas Morley); a symphony (in C); and the Lyric overture: From the West Country. His vocal works consisted of songs with piano accompaniment and were mostly published. He also wrote the school song for the Portway Senior Boys' School in nearby Shirehampton. His works were occasionally performed in London during his lifetime and at the Hereford for the Three Choirs Festival, and at least one was broadcast (the Lyric overture). No recordings of his music are known.

Bristol composer Jane Roeckel introduced Miles to the young violinist Marie Hall, and he became her benefactor. His financial support helped Hall live in London to attend the Royal Academy of Music, and later enabled her to study with Czech violinist Otakar Ševčík in Prague for 18 months. Miles was a friend and supporter of Ralph Vaughan Williams, whose violin rhapsody The Lark Ascending was first performed by Hall (with piano accompaniment) in 1920 at Shirehampton Public Hall at Miles' instigation.

Miles also founded the Avonmouth Choral Society and was president of the Bristol Madrigal Society (1910–1914). He organised operatic seasons at Shirehampton, the Victoria Rooms in Clifton, and the Theatre Royal. Some of his own operas were also staged at these venues. He tried to emulate Rutland Boughton's "village opera" at Glastonbury but his goal to establish an English national opera-house was unrealized. In 1925, the University of Bristol awarded him an honorary doctorate of letters for his services to music.

Miles' papers are currently deposited with the University of Bristol library. They include autograph scores, printed works, and correspondence (e.g. with Manuel de Falla), as well as signed copies of works by Gustav Holst, Vaughan Williams, Percy Grainger and John Stainer. It is uncertain whether any of his music has been publicly performed since the commemorative concert at the University of Bristol on 7 May 1935.

=== Operas ===
- Queen Rosamond
- Westward Ho! (1913; performed at the Lyceum, London)
- Fireflies (performed Bristol 1924)
- Markheim (1919; Carnegie Award 1921; performed Bristol 1924; vocal score published by J. Curwen, 1926)
- Good Friday (vocal score published by Oxford University Press, 1933)
- Demeter

=== Other published works ===
- Four Songs, poetry by Shelley. C. Jefferys, 1891.
- Hymn before Sunrise for Baritone Solo, Chorus and Orchestra, the words by S. T. Coleridge ... the pianoforte accompaniment arranged ... by S. P. Waddington. Boosey & Co, 1896.
- Fragment of an Ode to Maia. [Four-part song.] Words by Keats. Op. 5. No. 6, etc. Stainer & Bell, 1911.
- Nocturn. [Four-part song.] Words by E. F. Benson. Op. 5. No. 5, etc. Stainer & Bell, 1913.
- Rose cheek'd Laura. [Four-part song.] Words by T. Campion. Op. 5. No. 4. Stainer & Bell, 1916.
- Battle. [Song cycle.] Ten Songs, poems by W. W. Gibson. Op. 7. S. Acott & Co, 1917.
- Music comes. Choral Dance for tenor solo, female chorus and small orchestra, the poem by J. Freeman. Op. 11. [Vocal score.]. Boosey & Co, 1921.
- Battle .... Second Set. Op. 9. Poems by W. W. Gibson, etc. J. Curwen & Sons, 1929.
- Ode on a Grecian Urn. Poem by J. Keats ... For Chorus and Orchestra. Vocal Score. [Pianoforte version by Archibald Jacob.] Oxford University Press, 1931 [chorus version 1934].
- In the Belfry. [Mixed voices.] Poem by A. Dobson. Op. 20. No. 1 (The Oxford Choral Songs). Oxford University Press, 1932.
- Four Songs for Baritone Voice & Oboe. The words by Robert Bridges. (1. The Poppy. 2. The Cliff-top. 3. Thou art alone, fond Lover. 4. When June is come.) Oxford University Press, 1933.
- My Master hath a Garden. [Song.] The poem from "Corn from olde Fields," etc. Oxford University Press, 1933.
