= Larpent baronets =

Extinct baronetcy in the Baronetage of the United Kingdom

The Larpent Baronetcy, of Roehampton in the County of Surrey, was a title in the Baronetage of the United Kingdom.

== History ==
It was created on 13 October 1841 for George Larpent. He was also Baron de Hochepied in the Hungarian nobility. The baronetcy became extinct on the death of the third Baronet in 1899.

== Larpent baronets, of Roehampton (1841) ==
- Sir George Gerard de Hochepied Larpent, 1st Baronet (1786–1855)
- Sir Albert John de Hochepied Larpent, 2nd Baronet (1816–1861)
- Sir George Albert Larpent, 3rd Baronet (1846–1899)
