= Everard Fawkener =

British diplomat (1694–1758)

Sir Everard Fawkener (1694–1758) was an English merchant and diplomat, chiefly remembered for his friendship with Voltaire. His daughter was the celebrated political hostess Harriet Bouverie.

== Career ==
Fawkener was born into a family of silk merchants. His father, William (1642–1716) was a leading member of the Levant Company. Everard was sent out to Aleppo in 1716 and remained there until 1725. He then worked in the family firm of Snelling and Fawkener, leading the Levant merchants of their day until 1735.

He met the philosopher Voltaire in Paris on his way home from Aleppo in 1725. Voltaire stayed in Fawkener's house in Wandsworth during his lengthy visit to England in 1726. The two men maintained a warm and affectionate correspondence for many years. Voltaire dedicated his tragedy Zaïre to Fawkener in 1733,. In November 1748 Voltaire wrote to Fawkener "Now you are a husband and a father and I hope a happy one".

Fawkener was knighted in 1735. He was appointed as ambassador to the Ottoman Empire on 19 August 1735. He arrived in Constantinople on the 19th of December. He did not like it much there and got leave to return home on 8 November 1742. His credentials were finally recalled on 4 September 1746.

Upon his return, he became secretary to the Duke of Cumberland, a post which he held for the rest of his life. He was an eyewitness to the Battle of Fontenoy. He accompanied the Duke on his campaign in the Scottish Highlands to suppress the Jacobite rising of 1745. In 1745 he became Postmaster General. In this period he was a financial backer in the foundation of the Chelsea Porcelain Manufactory.

== Family ==
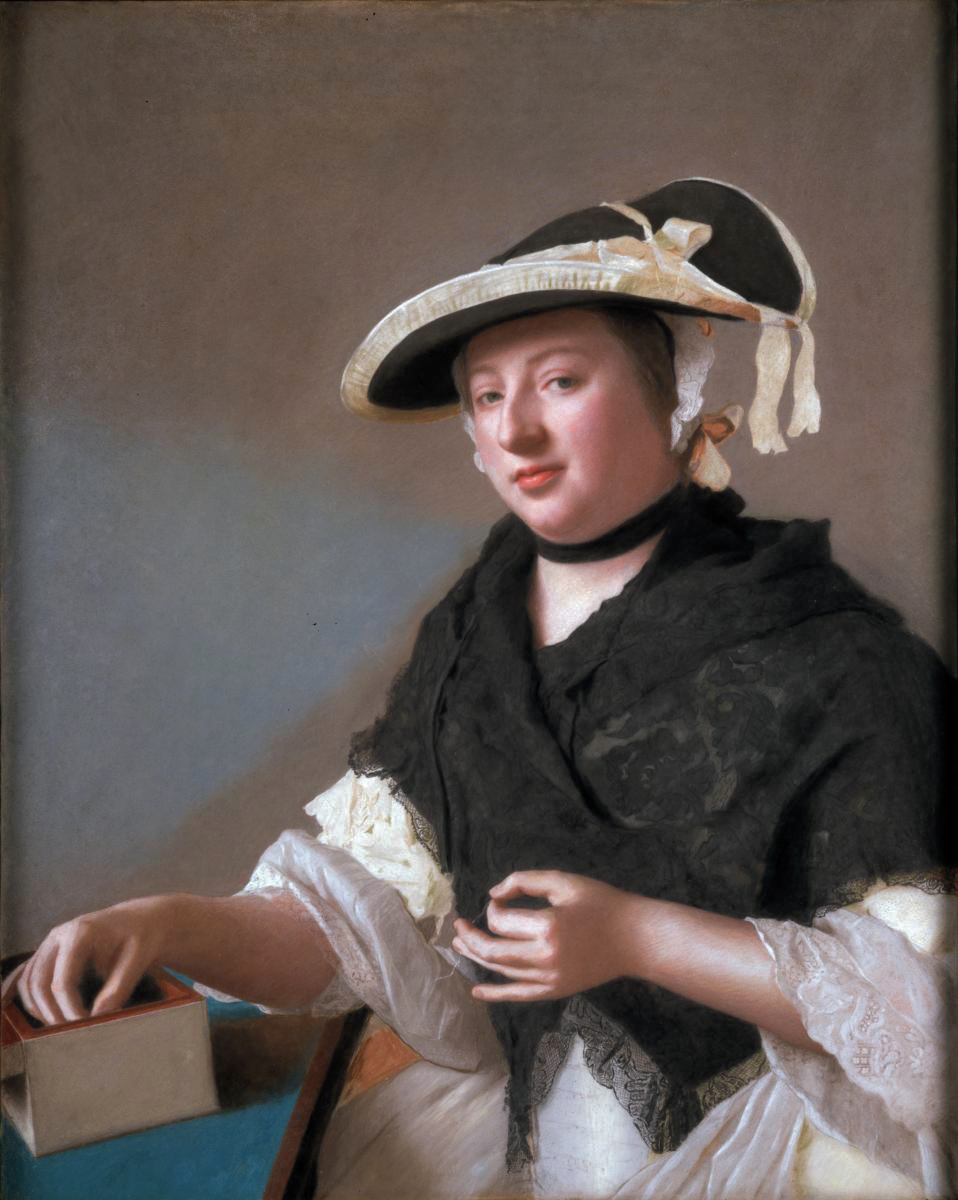
Harriet Churchill, Lady Fawkener (Jean-Étienne Liotard)

Fawkener did not marry until 1747, when aged 53. His wife was Harriet, the natural daughter of Lieutenant General Charles Churchill. A portrait of her by Constantinople-based artist Jean-Étienne Liotard hangs in Compton Verney House. They had a daughter, also named Harriet, who married Edward Bouverie and became the noted society hostess Mrs. Bouverie, and two sons, William Augustus Fawkener and Everard Fawkener of the 11th dragoons.

Fawkener lived at Westhorpe House near Little Marlow.

Diplomatic posts
Preceded by The Earl of Kinnoull	Ambassador to the Sublime Porte; 1737–1744	Succeeded by Sir James Porter
Government offices
Preceded by Sir John Eyles; The Earl of Leicester	Postmaster General; 1745-58; With: The Earl of Leicester	Succeeded by The Lord Trevor; The Earl of Bessborough
