= Amyand =

Amyand is a surname, and may refer to:

- Claudius Amyand (surgeon) (c.1660–1740), French surgeon
- Claudius Amyand (MP) (1718–1774), English politician and government official
- George Amyand (1720–1766), British politician, physician and merchant
- John Amyand (1751–1780), English Whig politician
