= Ronald Keller =

Dutch diplomat

Ron Keller (born 27 March 1958) is an economist and former Dutch top civil servant and diplomat. He was Dutch ambassador to Ukraine, Russia, Turkey and China between 2005 and 2017 after which he obtained an honourable dismissal from the Foreign Service. Currently he works as international consultant, advisor and analyst on international financial and geopolitical affairs.

Keller finished his studies in Economics at the University of Amsterdam cum laude in 1983. From 1984 to 1991 he worked as advisor, head of division and personal assistant to the Minister at the Ministry of Finance. From 1991 till 1994 he served as the first Dutch Executive Director at the European Bank for Reconstruction and Development in London. Subsequently Keller returned to the Ministry of Finance of the Netherlands as Director Export Credit Insurance (1994-1997) and Director Foreign Financial Relations (1997-2000).

Since 2000 he worked for the Dutch Foreign Ministry. Between 2000 and 2005 he served as Director General for International Cooperation. His first ambassadorship was from 2005 to 2009 as the Dutch ambassador to Ukraine (2005-2009), also accredited to Moldova. From October 2009 through August 2013 he was the Netherlands' ambassador to Russia, also accredited to Uzbekistan and Turkmenistan. He presented his credentials to Russian president Dmitry Medvedev on 12 October 2009. From 2013 to 2015 he was the Netherlands' ambassador to Turkey. From 2015 to 2017 he was Netherlands’ ambassador to China, also accredited to Mongolia.

As from 2017 Ron Keller works as Consultant, Analyst and Lecturer on Geopolitics and Global Economics and Finance. He serves as Advisor to governments, multilateral institutions and to international businesses and member of Euro Défense Netherlands. Additionally, he is (guest) Lecturer at e.g. the University of Groningen, the University of Leiden and the Netherlands International Finance Academy. On a regular basis, he analyses Geopolitical and international economic and financial developments on Dutch and international television, radio and other media. Since 2024, he has been on the Advisory Board of EPIS Thinktank and advises it on foreign and security policy issues.
