= George Percy Jacomb-Hood =

English painter and illustrator (1857–1929)

George Percy Jacomb-Hood MVO
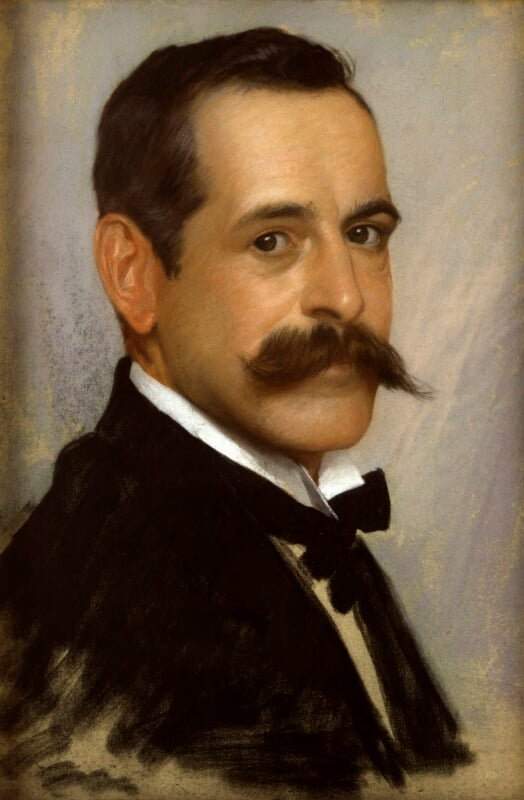
- Self-portrait, held at the National Portrait Gallery, London
- Born: July 6, 1857; Redhill, Surrey, United Kingdom
- Died: December 11, 1929 (aged 72); Alassio, Italy
- Education: Tonbridge School; Slade School of Art
- Family: Robert Jacomb-Hood (father); John Wykeham Jacomb-Hood (brother)

George Percy Jacomb-Hood (6 July 1857 – 11 December 1929) was an English painter, etcher, printmaker, and illustrator. After winning a scholarship to the Slade School of Fine Art in London, he studied at the École des Beaux-Arts in Paris and in Madrid. By the 1880s he was exhibiting at the Royal Academy of Arts and the Royal Society of British Artists. Around this time, French-trained artists in Chelsea began to develop collective studios to reflect their influences, and he was a founding member of the New English Art Club in 1886, whose early meetings were held at his studio in Manresa Road. He was also a founding member of the Royal Society of Portrait Painters in 1891.

Much of Jacomb-Hood's work was as an illustrator for The Graphic and The Illustrated London News. It was through the former of these that Jacomb-Hood was sent to the 1896 Summer Olympics in Athens, and then the 1902 and 1905 tours of India by George, Prince of Wales, who acceded to the throne as George V in 1910. Jacomb-Hood then accompanied him and Queen Mary on their 1911 Indian tour as part of their personal staff, painting the Investiture of the Star of India for Ganga Singh, a copy of which was gifted to Queen Mary by her son Edward, Prince of Wales. For his work on the tour, Jacomb-Hood was then awarded membership of the Royal Victorian Order in 1912.

During his career, Jacomb-Hood was also a council member of the Royal Society of Painter-Etchers, and the Royal Institute of Oil Painters. He illustrated many books, including The Blue Fairy Book (1889) and The Picture of Dorian Gray (1890) by Oscar Wilde; both Jacomb-Hood and Wilde lived on Tite Street in Chelsea, something Jacomb-Hood refers to in his 1925 autobiography With Brush and Pencil.

== Early life and education ==
Jacomb-Hood was born on 6 July 1857 at Redhill in Surrey, the eldest son of his parents. His father was Robert Jacomb-Hood, himself a prominent railway engineer and the Resident Engineer and later a director of the London, Brighton and South Coast Railway. His mother was Jane Jacomb-Hood (née Littlewood), and his parents had married on 25 November 1851. His mother died in 1869 and his father in 1900. His grandfather, born Robert Jacomb, had inherited an estate at Bardon Hall from a cousin, and changed his surname to 'Jacomb-Hood' as a condition of the inheritance. His father sold the estate on 13 June 1864 when he was aged 6.

Jacomb-Hood was educated at Tonbridge School in 1872–73 alongside his younger brother John Wykeham. He then won a scholarship to study at the Slade School of Fine Art, the art school of University College London. There he studied under Edward Poynter and Alphonse Legros, and then at the École des Beaux-Arts in Paris under Jean-Paul Laurens and John Lavery. He won prizes while at the school. In 1895 he was recorded, alongside his brother, as a member of the Old Tonbridgians Society. He then won a travelling scholarship which allowed him to spend time in Madrid, studying the works of Diego Velázquez.

== Career ==
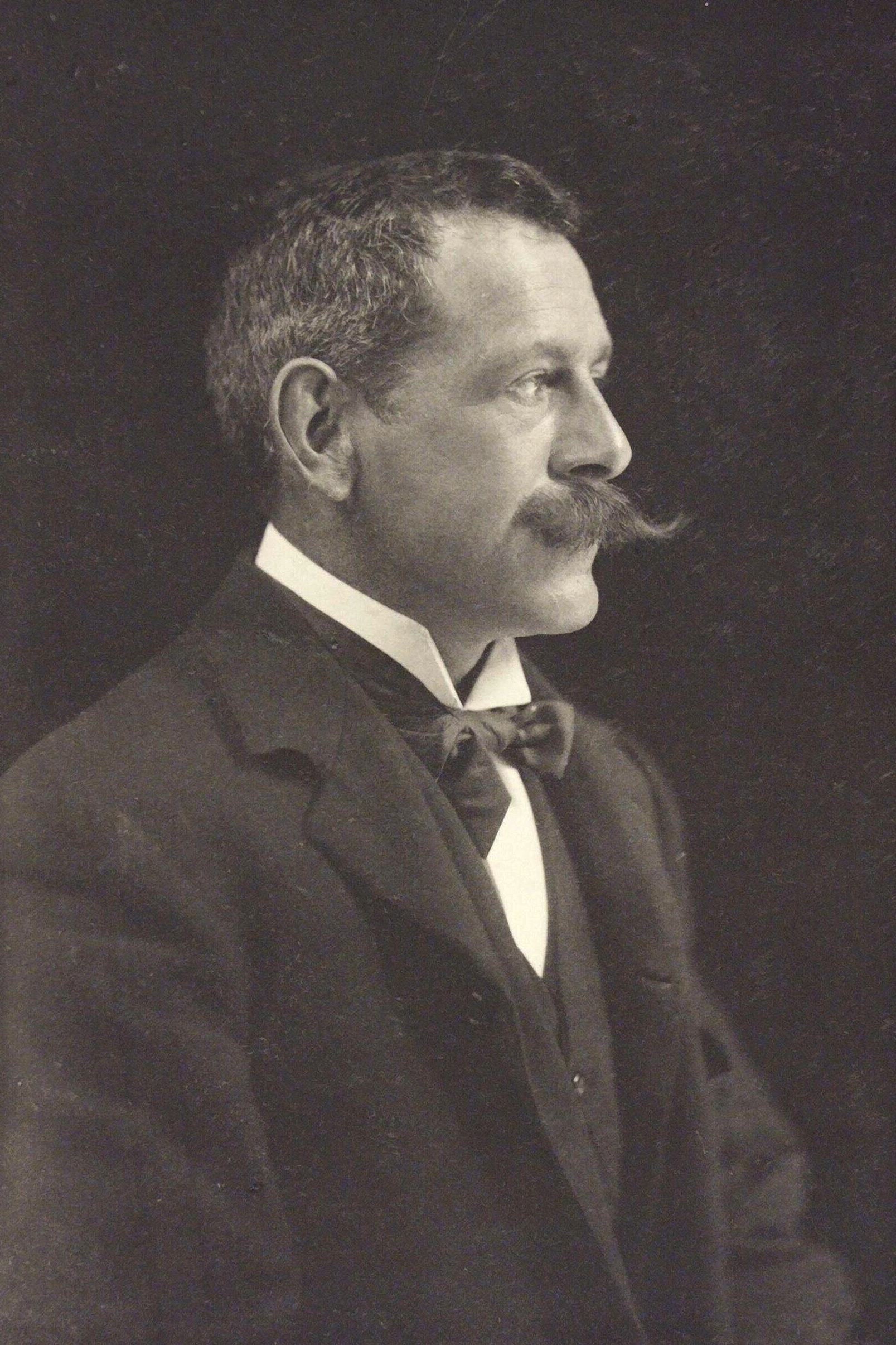
Photograph of Jacomb-Hood by Frederick Hollyer, c. 1890, held at the Victoria and Albert Museum

Jacomb-Hood worked with media which included engraving, painting, printmaking, and illustration. After completing his education, Jacomb-Hood set up his first studio in Fulham, London. Starting in 1877, Jacomb-Hood began to exhibit works in London at the Royal Academy of Arts, the Grosvenor Gallery and the gallery of the Royal Society of British Artists. In 1887 he received a jury commendation for his exhibit at the Salon des Artistes Français. Jacomb-Hood was a founding member of the Royal Society of British Artists in 1884. In the 1880s, Chelsea was popular with French-trained artists, who formed several studios together. Jacomb-Hood was a founding member of the New English Art Club in 1886 that came out of this movement, and he hosted their early meetings at his studio. By this time, his gallery was located on Manresa Road. He was also a founding member of the Royal Society of Portrait Painters in 1891, and began to exhibit there in the same year.

Jacomb-Hood worked as an illustrator for The Illustrated London News and also The Graphic, who gave him a number of overseas assignments, including as 'artist-correspondent' at the 1896 Summer Olympics in Athens, the first of the modern games, where he produced illustrations. The Graphic then sent him to India in 1902 to produce illustrations of the Dehli Durbar of 1903. He was then sent again to India in 1905 to follow George, Prince of Wales and the Princess of Wales on their royal tour. At the 1900 Exposition Universelle in Paris, he won a bronze medal for his prints.

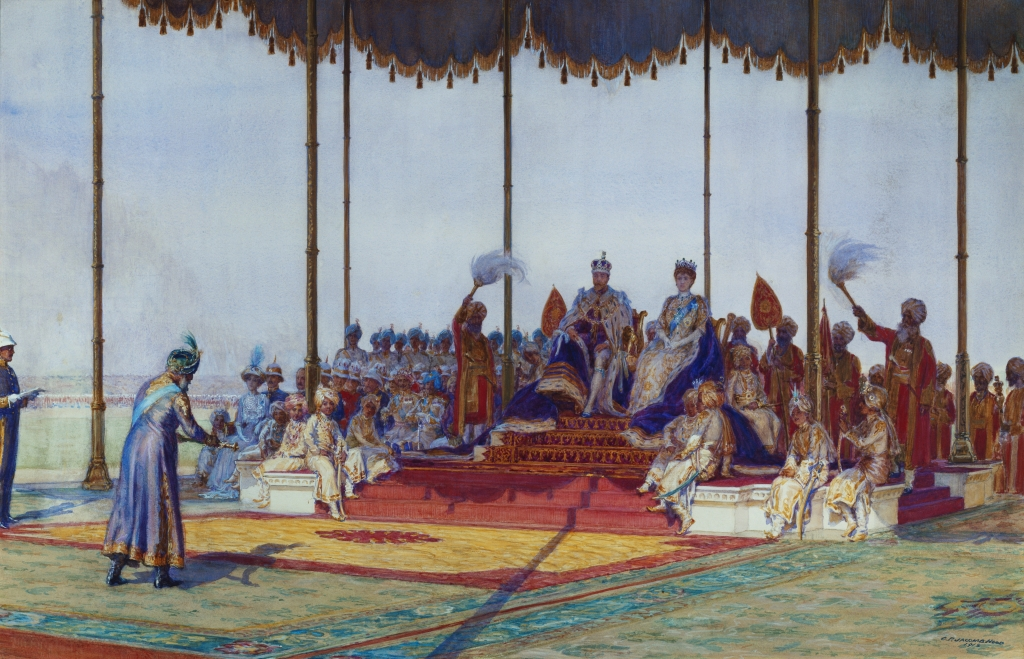
Jacomb-Hood painted King George V and Queen Mary at the Delhi Durbar in his capacity as the royal artist.

As early as October 1911, it became known that Jacomb-Hood would be the official artist for King George V's tour of India, which included the Delhi Durbar of 1911. Jacomb-Hood formed part of the King's personal staff in this capacity, with the tour taking place in December of that year. During the tour, he painted The Investiture of the Star of India, also known simply as The Investiture; the painting depicts the investiture ceremony for the Order of the Star of India that took place in Delhi. The painting was for Ganga Singh, but a copy was made for the Prince of Wales which he gifted to the Queen. For his work, he became known in India as 'the royal artist'. For his work on the tour, he was awarded membership of the Royal Victorian Order (MVO) in 1912.

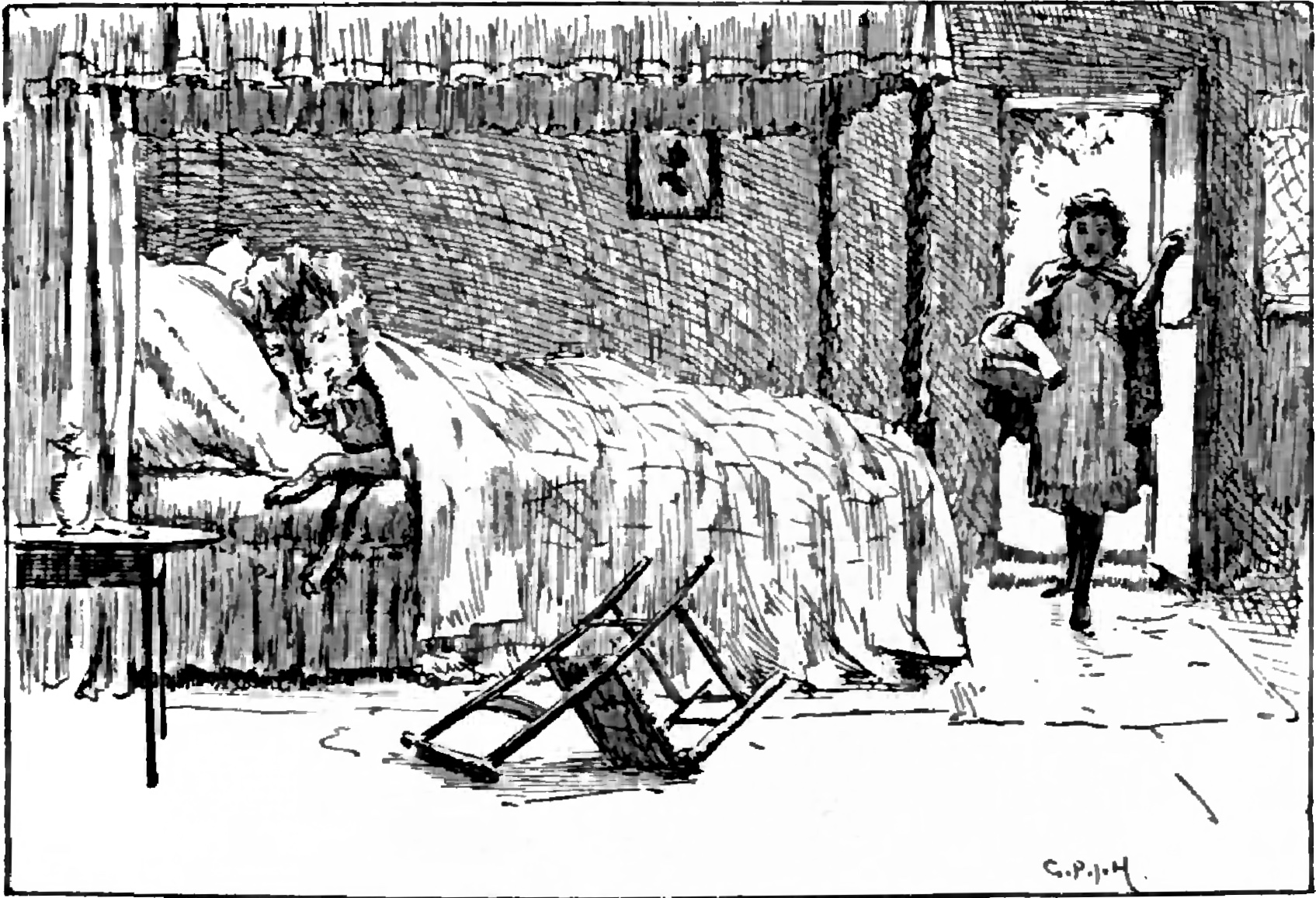
Little Red Riding Hood in the Blue Fairy Book, which Jacomb-Hood illustrated

During his career, Jacomb-Hood also served on the council of the Royal Society of Painter-Etchers. He wrote an autobiography in 1925, entitled With Brush and Pencil. He exhibited at the first exhibition of the Society of Graphic Art in London in 1921. After 1877, he also exhibited paintings and bronzes at the Royal Hibernian Academy, the Royal Institute of Oil Painters, of which he was a member, and the New Watercolour Society. Jacomb-Hood illustrated many books, including Adrift in a Great City (1892), A Tale of the Dutch (1901) and The Boy's Iliad (1902). He also illustrated Andrew Lang's The Blue Fairy Book, published in 1889. He was the Honorary Treasurer of the Chelsea Arts Club. s well as his portraits of high society, he also worked with Leopold Hartley Grindon to produce illustrations of the northern working class in the style of social realism. In 1989, his works were shown at The Last Romantics: The Romantic Tradition in British Art, an exhibition at the Barbican Centre.

== Personal life ==
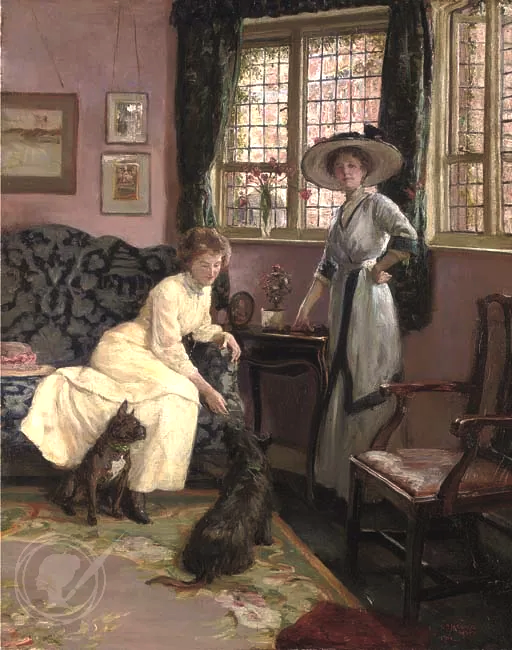
The Drawing Room at No. 26 Tite Street, Chelsea by Jacomb-Hood depicts his wife and sister-in-law.

Jacomb-Hood was a close friend and contemporary of Henry Scott Tuke; the pair went to the Slade School of Art together, and formed part of a group of Chelsea artists. He was also a friend of John Singer Sargent, and the pair went horse riding together. On 4 June 1910, Jacomb-Hood's engagement to Henrietta Kemble de Hochepied-Larpent (known simply as Rita or Reta) was announced in newspapers; Henrietta was the fourth child of Arthur de Hochepied Larpent, 8th Baron de Hochepied. The couple married on 28 June 1910 at the Church of the Annunciation in the parish of St Marylebone. The marriage was modest, with no bridesmaids or groomsmen, and only a small reception afterwards. The couple took their honeymoon at a house in Kingsweston that had been lent to them by Philip Napier Miles, Henrietta's brother-in-law.

Jacomb-Hood lived in various high-end properties in Kensington and Chelsea, both in West London. He lived at 26 Tite Street, Chelsea from 1892 until his death. Oscar Wilde was a fellow resident of Tite Street while Jacomb-Hood lived there, and his autobiography With Brush and Pencil contains many anecdotes of his experiences with Wilde. He also illustrated Wilde's book The Picture of Dorian Gray. In 1926, Jacomb-Hood was fined a total of 35 shillings (£1.75, equivalent to £92 in 2025) for receiving a driving lesson in Battersea Park from Beatrice de Hochepied Larpent, his sister-in-law. During this lesson, he had run the car off the road and damaged the park's furniture; his instructor was fined 10 shillings (£0.50, equivalent to £26 in 2025).

Jacomb-Hood's entry in the University College London student records state he was a member of the Savile Club in Mayfair. He died on 11 December 1929, aged 72, while on a visit to Alassio, Italy. At the time, he was living at his Tite Street address. His death was widely reported in newspapers, which referred to him as a "noted" and "well-known" as an artist and a "distinguished resident of Redhill". Jacomb-Hood's will and testament was read in March 1930; he had a net worth of £11,986, equivalent to £677,000 in 2025.

== Gallery ==
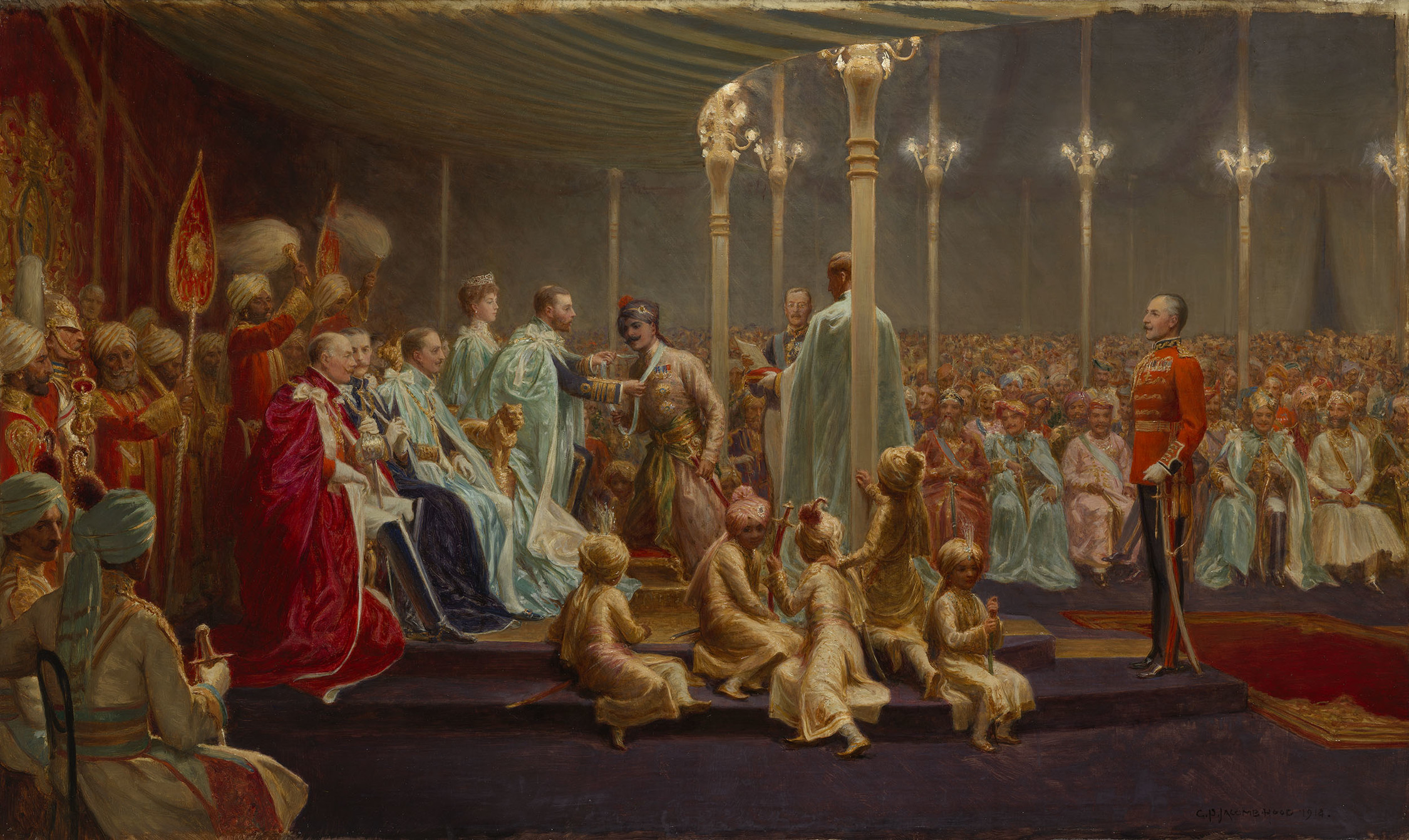
Investiture of the Star of India, 1911

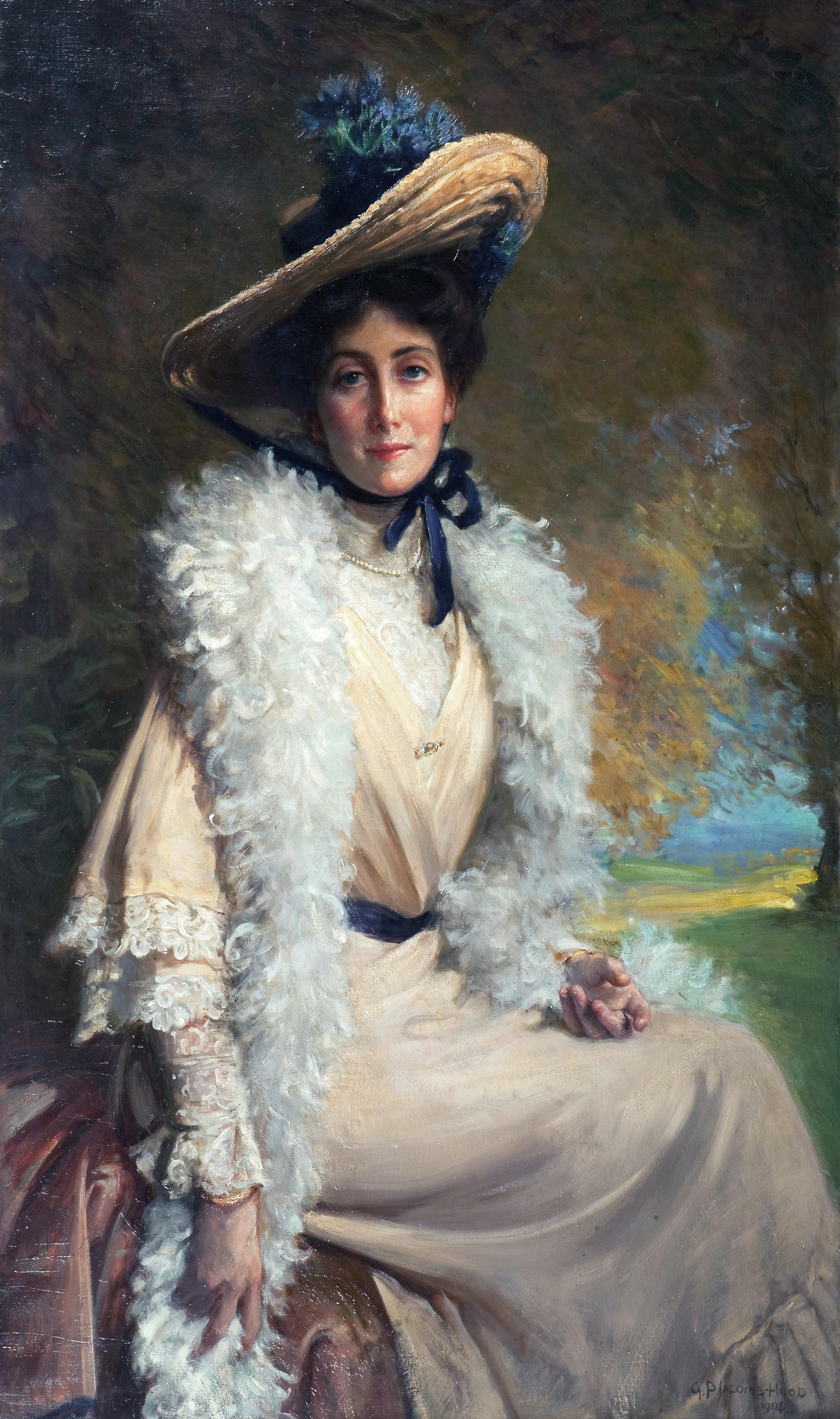
Mrs Walter Frith, 1904

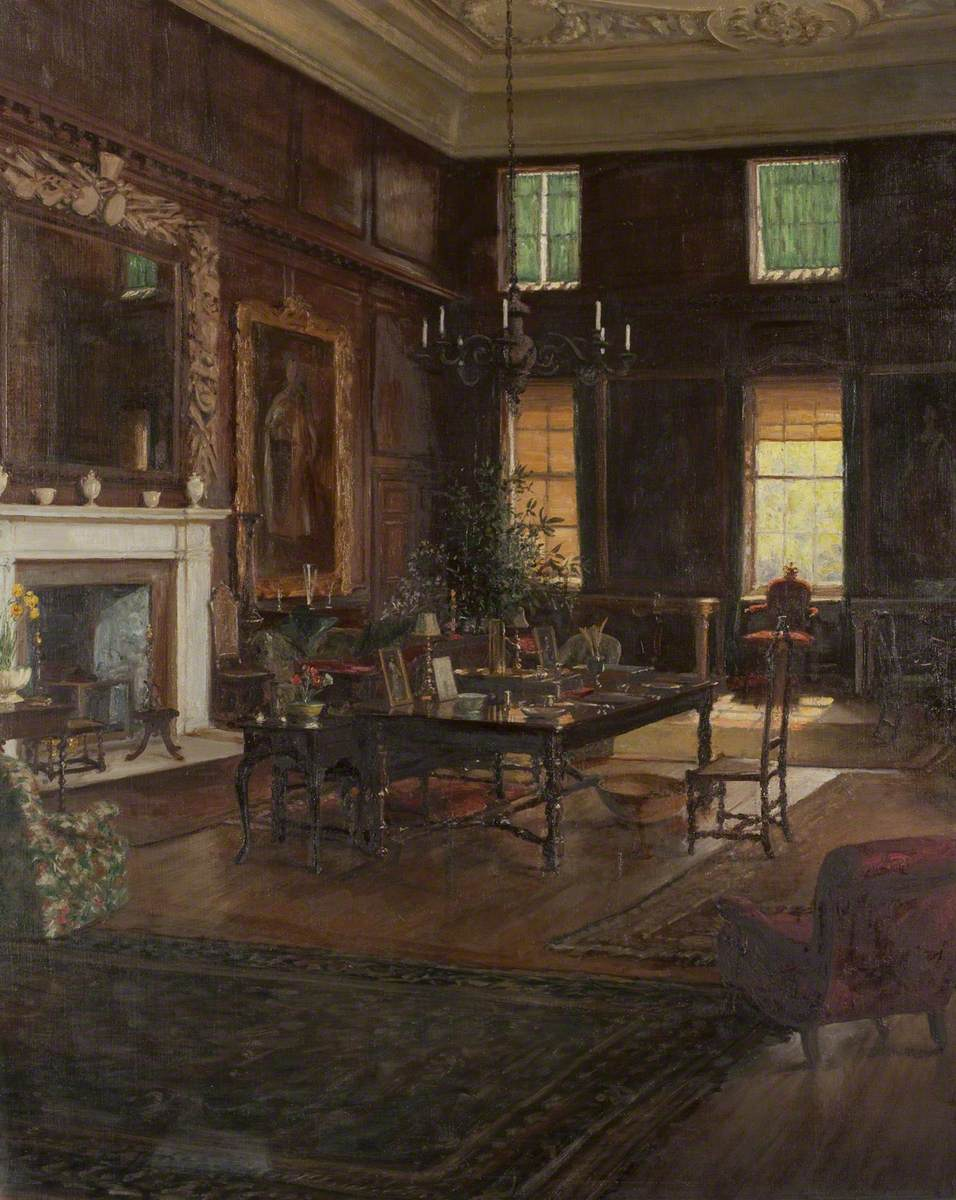
State Room, Governor's House, Royal Hospital, Chelsea, 1922

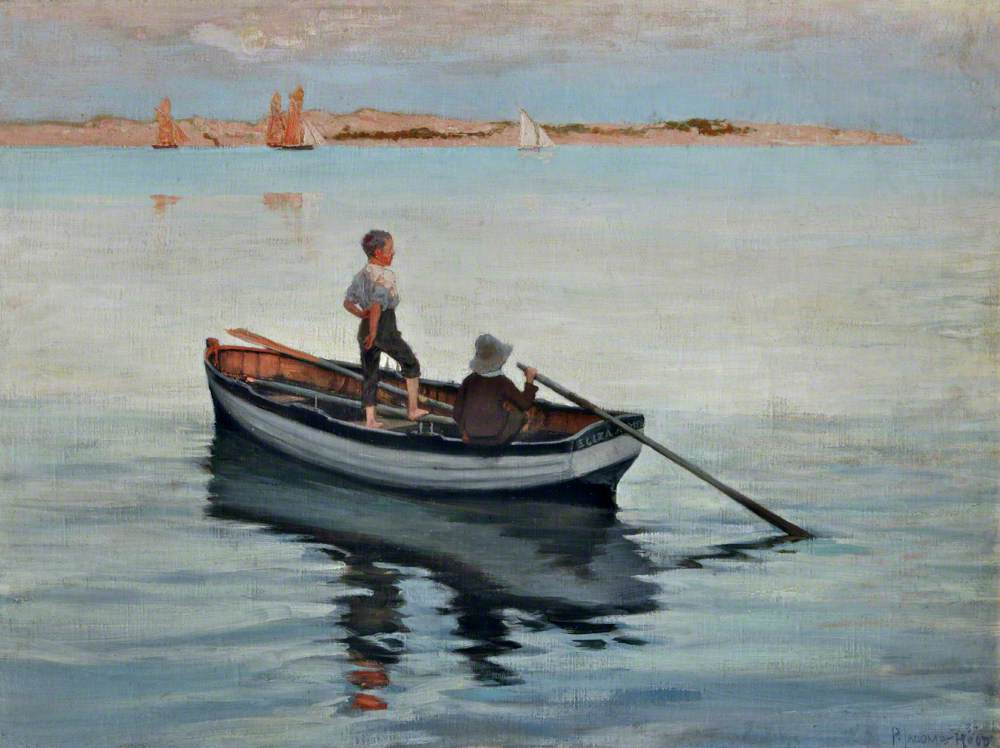
Two Boys in a Boat, 1887
