= Willem Gerrit Dedel (1726–1768) =

Dutch politician and diplomat

Willem Gerrit Dedel (17 May 1726 in The Hague – 26 January 1768 in Büyükelçi (Constantinople)) was a Dutch politician and diplomat, who represented the States General of the Dutch Republic at the Sublime Porte.

== Personal life ==
Dedel was the son of Jan Hudde Dedel, (Note: Whose father was his namesake Willem Gerrit Dedel, a bewindhebber (managing director) of the WIC) burgemeester of The Hague, and Magdalena Antonia Muyssart. He never married.

== Career ==
Dedel was Postmaster of the Post Office for Brabant, France, Spain and Portugal in The Hague before 1742. In 1758 he was appointed a Commissioner of Amsterdam and captain of the Amsterdam schutterij. Promoted to Colonel in 1764. In 1763 he was elected schepen of Amsterdam.

In 1764 he was appointed ambassador of the States General (Note: All Dutch ambassadors were appointed by the States General, whom they represented, and not by the stadtholder. In any case, William V, Prince of Orange was a minor at this time.) at the court of the Sultan of the Ottoman Empire, Mustafa III, as successor of ambassador Mathias van Asten, who died in 1764 in office. It took him until the next year, however, before he undertook the voyage together with two companions: Johan Raye van Breukelerwaard and Jan Abraham Meijn van Spanbroek. He wrote a journal about the journey, entitled: Kort dagverhael van mijn rijze uyt den Haeg nae Constantinopel welke ik begonnen heb in het einde van het jaer 1764 (Short journal of my voyage from the Hague to Constantinople that I started on at the end of the year 1764).

After his arrival in 1765 he spent three years at the Porte. He died in office in his mansion in the diplomatic quarter of Constantinople in 1768

== Sources ==
- Elias, J. (1903). "Mr. Willem Gerrit Dedel, in: De Vroedschap van Amsterdam, 1578-1795. Deel 2". Google Books (in Dutch). p. 682.
