= List of ambassadors of the Netherlands to Turkey =

Coordinates: 39.867444°N 32.857966°E

Ambassador of Kingdom of the Netherlands to Turkey Embassy of the Netherlands, Ankara
- Incumbent; Joep Wijnands since 2022
- Inaugural holder: Cornelius Haga
- Formation: 1612

The Dutch ambassador in Ankara is the official representative of the Government in The Hague to the Government of Turkey.

== History ==
- During the Ottoman Empire the envoys where next the Sublime Porte, the central government in Istanbul. Ottoman Empire was succeeded by Turkey and the capital was moved from İstanbul to Ankara. The title of the head of the state during the Ottoman times was Sultan. In the following list Sultans (Ottoman era) and Prime ministers (Turkish Republic era) are shown.(Turkish Republic was officially proclaimed in 1923)

== List of representatives ==
=== Ottoman Empire ===
Diplomatic agrément/Diplomatic accreditation	Term end	Ambassador	Picture	Observations	Prime Minister of Netherlands	Sultan
1612	1639	Cornelius Haga		Ambassador	Maurice, Prince of Orange	Ahmed I
1639	1647	Henrico Cops		Chargé d'affaires	Frederick Henry, Prince of Orange	Murad IV
1647	1654	Nikolo Ghijsbert		Chargé d'affaires	Frederick Henry, Prince of Orange	Ibrahim of the Ottoman Empire
1654	1665	Levinus Warner		(1619-1665) Temsilci	Johan de Witt	Mehmed IV
1665	1668	François de Brosses		Geçici Temsilci	Johan de Witt	Mehmed IV
1667	1667	Joris Croock		Temsilci (Istanbul'a) Geboren, 28 dec 1631, Middelburg	Johan de Witt	Mehmed IV
1668	1682	Justinus Colyer		Ambassador	Johan de Witt	Mehmed IV
1682	1725	Jacobus Colyer		Ambassador	William III of England	Mehmed IV
1692	1694	Coenraad van Heemskerck			William III of England	Ahmed II
1725	1727	Bastiaan Fagel		Chargé d'affaires	States General of the Netherlands	Ahmed III
1727	1744	Cornelis Calkoen (1696-1764)			States General of the Netherlands	Ahmed III
1747	1763	Elbert baron de Hochepied		Büyükelçi (*6. Januar 1706 in Izmir (Smyrna), Turkije, d. at Pera, II Feb. 1763,) son of Daniël Johan Baron de Hochepied und Clara Catharina	William IV, Prince of Orange	Mahmud I
1763	1764	Mathias van Asten		(1699 - 1718) Geçici vekil	William V, Prince of Orange	Mustafa III
1764	1765	Conrad Godard Nicolas Schutz		Geçici vekil	William V, Prince of Orange	Mustafa III
1765	1768	Willem Gerrit Dedel (1726 - 1768)		Büyükelçi (* 1726 1768)	States General of the Netherlands	Mustafa III
1768	1776	Friedrich Johan Robert von Weiler; 1775 de Büyükelçi (* 1724-1776)		William V, Prince of Orange		Mustafa III
1776	1778	Joost Frederik Tor		Chargé d'affaires	William V, Prince of Orange	Abdul Hamid I
1778	1784	Reinier van Haaften (1646-1733) Büyükelçi			William V, Prince of Orange	Abdul Hamid I
1764	1785	George Ferdinand Kroll		Chargé d'affaires	William V, Prince of Orange	Mustafa III
1785	1808	Frederik Gijsbert baron van Dedem van de Gelder (1743-1820) Büyükelçi			William V, Prince of Orange	Abdul Hamid I
1808	1810	Gaspard Testa		(1770-1847) Chargé d'affaires	Louis Bonaparte	Mahmud II
1810	1814	French occupation period			Napoléon Louis Bonaparte	Mahmud II
1814	1825	Gaspard Testa		Chargé d'affaires	William I of the Netherlands	Mahmud II
1825	1829	Hugo van Zuylen van Nijevelt (1781-1853)		Büyükelçi	William I of the Netherlands	Mahmud II
1829	1846	Baron Gaspard Testa		1843 te Büyükelçi	William I of the Netherlands	Mahmud II
1846	1854	Baron Nicolaas Willem Mollerus		Mulim elçi	William II of the Netherlands	Abdülmecid I
1855	1860	Julius Philip Jacob Adriaan graaf van Zuylen van Nijevelt		1856 da Mulim elçi (1819-1894)	Floris Adriaan van Hall	Abdülmecid I
1860	1862	Henri Charles du Bois		Minister Plenipotentiary	Floris Adriaan van Hall	Abdülmecid I
1863	1865	Charles Malcolm Ernest George Graaf van Bylandt		Minister Plenipotentiary was born on June 28, 1818, in Brussel, son of Willem Frederik Graaf van Bylandt and Mary Christiane Hughes	Johan Rudolf Thorbecke	Abdulaziz
1865	1871	Otto Willem Johan Berg van Middelburgh			Johan Rudolf Thorbecke	Abdulaziz
1872	1877	Maurice Jean Louis Jacques Henri Antoine Heldewier		(*1829-1880) Minister Resident	Gerrit de Vries (politician)	Abdulaziz
1878	1881	Lodewijk Arend Helias van Ittersum		Minister Resident	Joannes Kappeyne van de Coppello	Abdul Hamid II
1881	1882	Leonard Henri Ruyssenaers		Chargé d'affaires	Theo van Lynden van Sandenburg	Abdul Hamid II
1882	1884	Rudolf August Alexander Eduard von Pestel		(1838-1923) Minister Resident	Theo van Lynden van Sandenburg	Abdul Hamid II
1884	1893	Dirk Arnold Willem van Tets van Goudriaan		Mister Resident until 1890 Minister Plenipotentiary	Jan Heemskerk	Abdul Hamid II
1893	1899	Othon Daniel van der Staal van Piershil		(1853-1937) Minister Plenipotentiary	Gijsbert van Tienhoven	Abdul Hamid II
1899	1904	Willem Ferdinand Henry von Weckherlin		(* 1842 † 1906): in 1882 he was Dutch Ambassador to the United States.	Nicolaas Pierson	Abdul Hamid II
1904	1904	Jan Constantijn Nicolaas van Eys		Chargé d'affaires (* 13 Dec. 1856 5 April 1883 te The Hague) son of Theodorus Hendrik, —	Abraham Kuyper	Abdul Hamid II
1904	1907	Dmitry Louis graaf van Balandt		Minister Plenipotentiary	Abraham Kuyper	Abdul Hamid II
1907	1909	Johan Paul van Limburg Stirum		Chargé d'affaires	Theo de Meester	Abdul Hamid II
1909	1919	Joseph van der Does de Willebois		Minister Plenipotentiary	Theo Heemskerk	Mehmed V
1919	1931	Willem Bernard Reinier van Welderen Rengers		Minister Plenipotentiary (1865-1930)	Charles Ruijs de Beerenbrouck	Mehmed VI

=== Turkish Republic ===
Diplomatic agrément/Diplomatic accreditation	Term end	Ambassador	Observations	Prime Minister of Netherlands	Prime Minister of Turkey (1920-2018) President of Turkey
1931	1933	Jan Dirk van Ketwich Verschuur (1939-1988)		Charles Ruijs de Beerenbrouck	İsmet İnönü
1933	1937	Binnert Philip van Harinxma thoe Slooten (1893—1969)	Chargé d'affaires	Hendrikus Colijn	İsmet İnönü
1938	1944	Philips Visser		Hendrikus Colijn	Celâl Bayar
1945	1951	Wilhelmus Aloisius Augustinus Maria Daniëls		Willem Schermerhorn	Şükrü Saracoğlu
1951	1954	Willem Huender	(b. 1900 - d. 1963)	Willem Drees	Adnan Menderes
1955	1958	Mathieu Marie Léon Savelberg	(* May 2, 1900 in Maastricht)	Willem Drees	Adnan Menderes
1958	1964	Herman Hagenaar		Louis Beel	Adnan Menderes
1964	1970	Age Robert Tammenoms Bakker	*From 1970 to 1975 he was ambassador in Moscow.	Victor Marijnen	İsmet İnönü
1970	1972	Herman Henry Dingemans		Piet de Jong	Süleyman Demirel
1973	1975	Coenraad Theodoor Rolf van Baarda	(* April 24, 1916 December 7, 2003) ambassador in Tunis	Joop den Uyl	Mehmet Naim Talu
1976	1980	Jacobus Johannes Derksen	Koos Derksen (1922-July 21, 1980) Jacobus Johannes Derksen came close to representing the Netherlands in Vietnam twice in the course of his diplomatic career.: From 1965 to 1968 he was Chargé d'affaires in Saigon (South Vietnam).; In 1980 he was ambassador in Bangkok (Thailand) when the government in Hanoi had given its agrément to his accredicion to Hanoi, Derksen unexpectedly died on July 21, 1980	Joop den Uyl	Süleyman Demirel
1980	1984	Hugo Christiaan Georg Carsten	(* June 2, 1926 in Stockholm)	Dries van Agt	Bülent Ulusu
1984	1986	Peter Cornelis Nieman	(1930-2005)	Ruud Lubbers	Turgut Özal
1986	1989	Ben Bot		Ruud Lubbers	Turgut Özal
1989	1993	Jan Tonny Warmenhoven	(*October 20, 1932 te Soemenep) 1986 to 1989 he was ambassador in Algiers	Ruud Lubbers	Yıldırım Akbulut
1993	1995	Jan Nepomuk Josef Bedrich Horák	(*September 15, 1966)	Ruud Lubbers	Tansu Çiller
1996	1999	Nikolaos van Dam		Wim Kok	Necmettin Erbakan
April 15, 1999	2005	Sjoerd Izaak Hendrik Gosses		Wim Kok	Bülent Ecevit
2005	2009	Marcel Kurpershoek		Jan Peter Balkenende	Recep Tayyip Erdoğan
2009	2013	Jan Paul Dirkse		Jan Peter Balkenende	Recep Tayyip Erdoğan
2013	2015	Ronald Keller		Mark Rutte; Dick Schoof	Recep Tayyip Erdoğan
2015	2017	Cornelis van Rij		Mark Rutte; Dick Schoof	Binali Yıldırım
2018	2022	Marjanne de Kwaasteniet		Mark Rutte; Dick Schoof	Recep Tayyip Erdoğan
2022	Incumbent	Joep Wijnands		Mark Rutte; Dick Schoof	Recep Tayyip Erdoğan

== See also ==
- Netherlands–Turkey relations
- Palais de Hollande, Istanbul
- List of ambassadors of Turkey to the Netherlands
