= Cornelius Haga =

Dutch ambassador to the Ottoman Empire

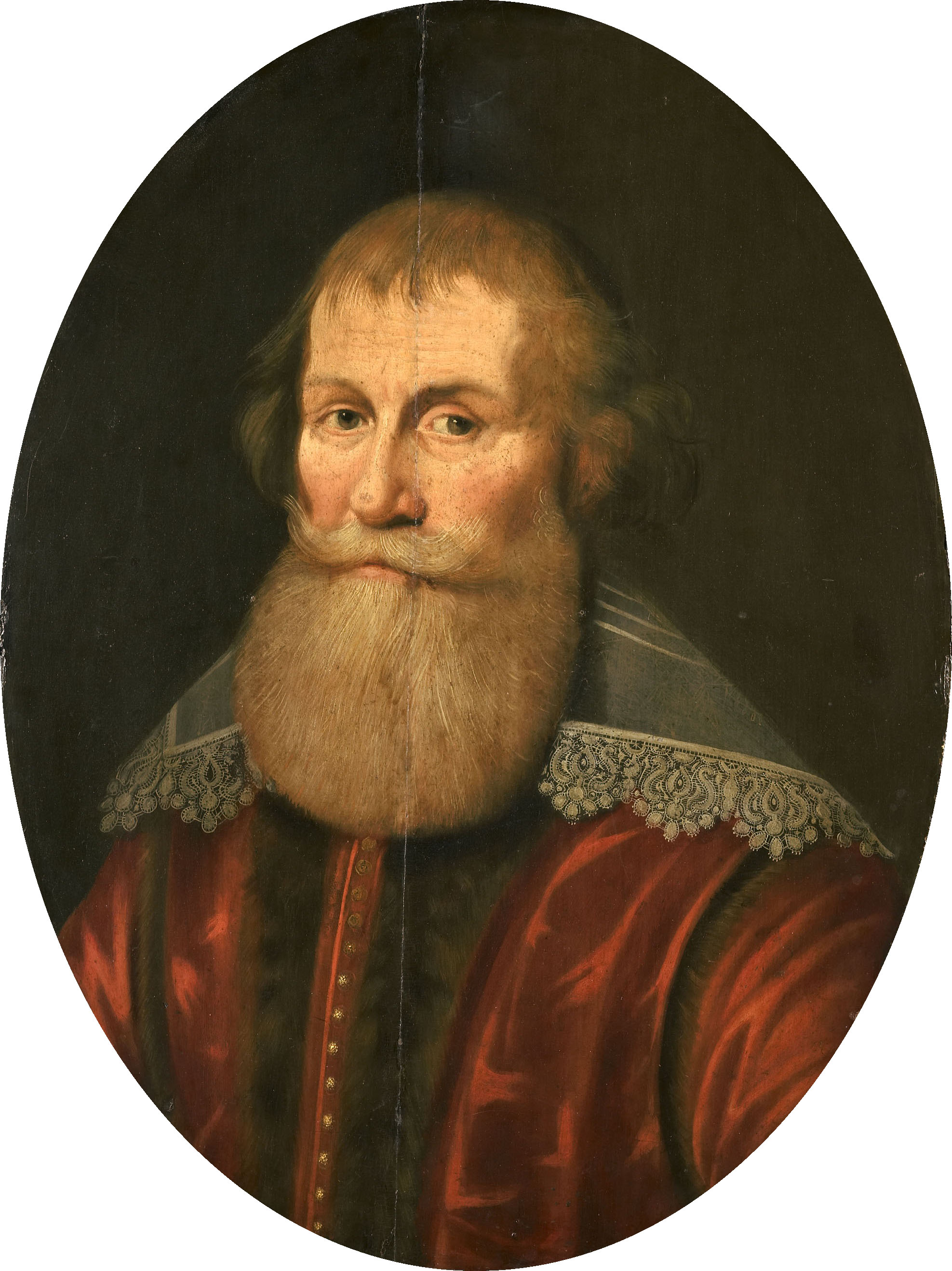
Portrait of Cornelis Haga by unknown 17th century painter, ca. 1645

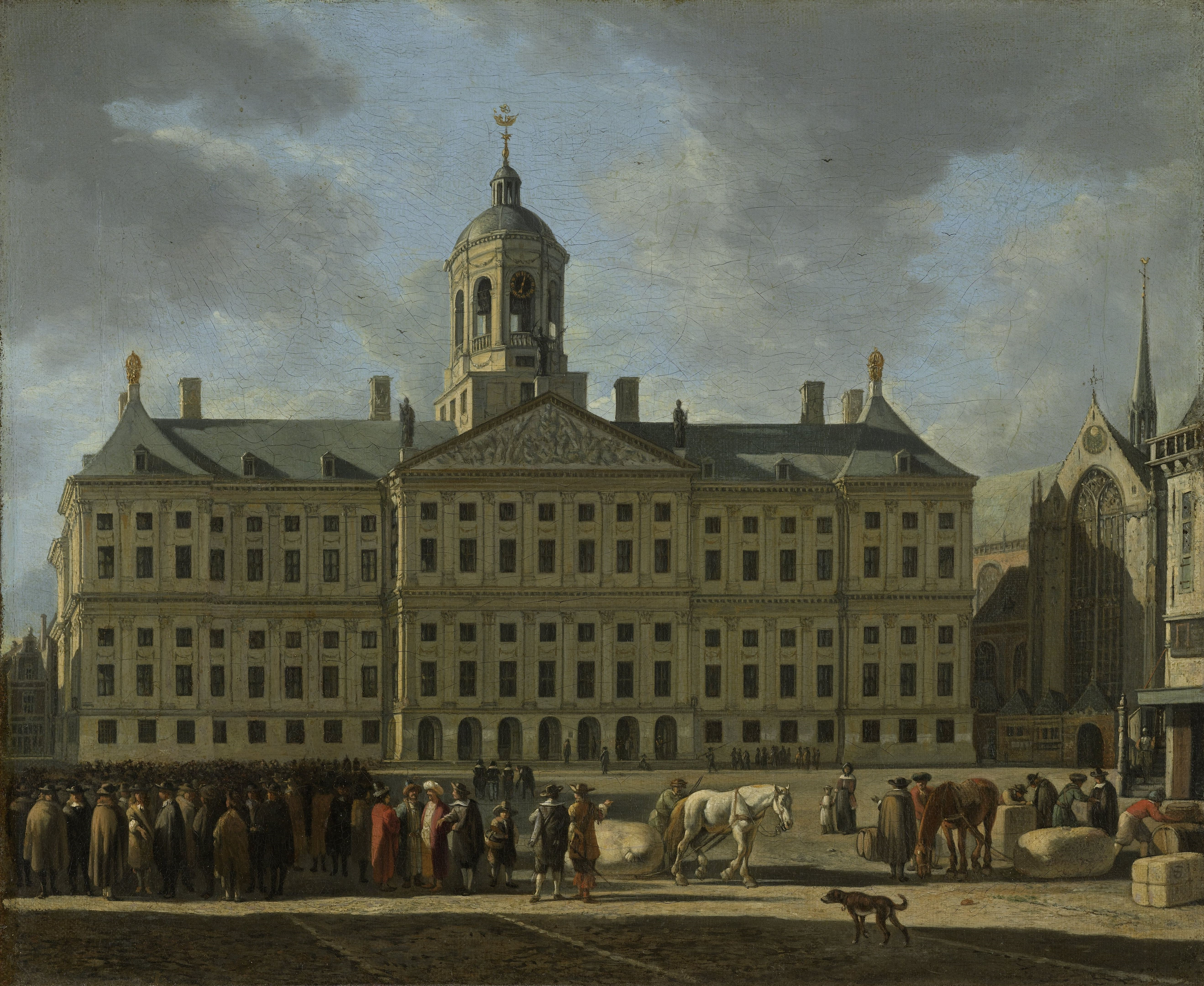
The efforts of Cornelius Haga established good relations between the Dutch Republic and the Ottoman Empire. Ottoman merchants can be seen on this painting by Gerrit Berckheyde.

Cornelius Haga (28 January 1578 – 12 August 1654) was a Dutch ambassador. He was the first ambassador of the Dutch Republic to the Ottoman Empire.

== Early life ==
Cornelius Haga was born in Schiedam. His father was Dirk Lambrechtszoon, merchant and member of the town council of Schiedam, and organist of the church there. Haga was educated at the Latin school in Schiedam before he studied law at the University of Leiden.

== Career ==
He went into diplomatic service and became an envoy in Stockholm. After this he became the first diplomatic representative of the republic in Constantinople from 1612 to 1639. He was accompanied on his adventurous journey by Cornelis Pauw (son of the Amsterdam mayor Reynier Pauw), Ernst Brinck, secretary, and Cornelis Sijms, both also sons of regents and Andries Suyderhoeff, who later replaced Brinck as secretary of the delegation, and Lambert Verhaer, who had been a goldsmith in Constantinople and was the only member of the group who had made the journey before.

Haga laid the foundations of diplomatic relations and he erected numerous consular posts at the most important ports and trade-centra in the Ottoman Empire; Patras, Thessaloniki, Athens, Gallipoli, Smyrna, Aleppo, Sidon, Dairo, Tunis and Algiers.

Haga received the capitulation of the Ottoman Sultan, Ahmed I in 1612. This allowed the Dutch to trade with the Ottoman Empire under their own jurisdiction. The sultan also granted the Dutch several privileges, including exemption of certain taxes and limited autonomy within the empire.

In 1639, Haga returned to the Netherlands (another ambassador was not appointed until Justinus Colyer's appointment in 1668). In 1645 he became president of the High Council of Holland, Zeeland and West-Friesland, a function that he kept until his death in 1654.

== Personal life ==
Cornelius Haga and his wife Alithea Brasser were buried in the Great church of Schiedam. His descendants added an epitaph to his grave, reading, amongst others Foris ac domi et de patria bene meritus fuit or He served his country well, both at home and abroad.

=== Legacy ===
His portrait by an unknown painter is in the collection of the Mauritshuis, on loan to the Rijksmuseum. His wife's portrait by Michiel van Mierevelt is in the collection of the KMSK of Antwerp.

== See also ==
- Palais de Hollande, Istanbul
