= Francis Seymour Larpent =

British lawyer and civil servant

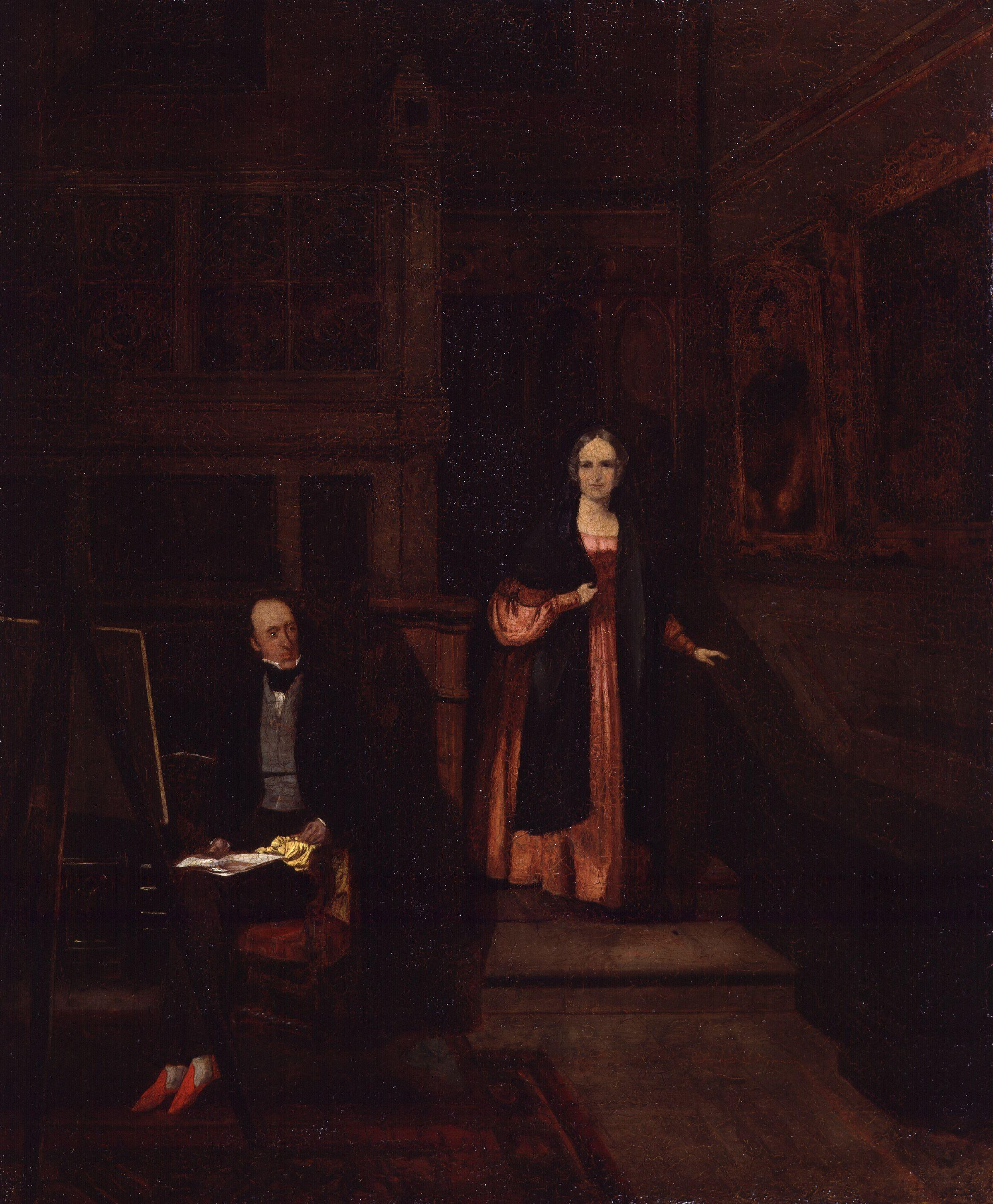
Francis Seymour Larpent with Charlotte Rosamund Larpent, portrait about 1830

Francis Seymour Larpent (15 September 1776 – 21 May 1845) was a British lawyer and civil servant. From 1812 to 1814, he served as Judge-Advocate General of the British Army under Arthur Wellesley, 1st Duke of Wellington. He wrote an account of this period which provides information about the theory and practice of military justice in the early 19th century.

After the Napoleonic Wars, Larpent worked in Gibraltar and Vienna, before returning to the United Kingdom where he died in 1845.

== Life ==
The eldest son of John Larpent, and half-brother of Sir George Gerard de Hochepied Larpent, he was educated at Cheam school. He entered St John's College, Cambridge in 1795, where he graduated B.A. as fifth wrangler in 1799, was elected fellow, and proceeded M.A. in 1802.

Larpent studied for some time under John Bayley the special pleader, was called to the bar, and went the western circuit, but did little business, but made some useful friendships. Charles Manners-Sutton, the judge-advocate general, selected him in 1812 to go out to the Iberian Peninsula as deputy judge-advocate general to the forces there. He remained till 1814 at headquarters with the Duke of Wellington, who thought highly of him. In August 1813 he was taken prisoner, but was exchanged almost immediately.

In 1814 Larpent was made a commissioner of customs. About the same time he was appointed civil and admiralty judge for Gibraltar. A new code was in course of formation, and Larpent was employed for a month or two in arranging the court-martial on General Sir John Murray.

In the spring of 1815 Larpent was invited by the Prince Regent to inquire into the improprieties which Princess Caroline was alleged to have committed abroad, but he insisted that his appointment should proceed from the government directly, and that he should not be employed to gather partisan evidence. Although he nominally set out to take up his work at Gibraltar, he went to Vienna, where he was accredited to Count Münster, and began his investigations into the princess's conduct, with the result that he dissuaded the prince's advisers from bringing her to public trial. He travelled on to Gibraltar, and remained there till 1820, when he was again employed in secret service with reference to Queen Caroline.

In 1821 Lord Liverpool made Larpent one of the commissioners of the board of audit of the public accounts. In 1826 he became its chairman, and in 1843 he retired. He died at Holmwood, near Dorking, Surrey, on 21 May 1845.

== Works ==
When in the Peninsula Larpent wrote descriptive letters to his step-mother; these were edited, with a preface by Sir George Larpent, under the title of Private Journals of Francis Seymour Larpent, London, 1853, 3 vols., and passed through three editions the same year.

== Family ==
Larpent married, first, on 15 March 1815, Catherine Elizabeth, second daughter of Frederick Reeves of East Sheen, Surrey—she died without issue on 17 Jan. 1822; secondly, on 10 Dec. 1829, Charlotte Rosamund, daughter of George Arnold Arnold of Halstead Place, Kent—she died at Bath on 28 April 1879.

== See also ==
- Peninsular War
