= John Larpent =

English inspector of plays

John Larpent (14 November 1741 – 18 January 1824) was an English inspector of plays.

== Early life ==
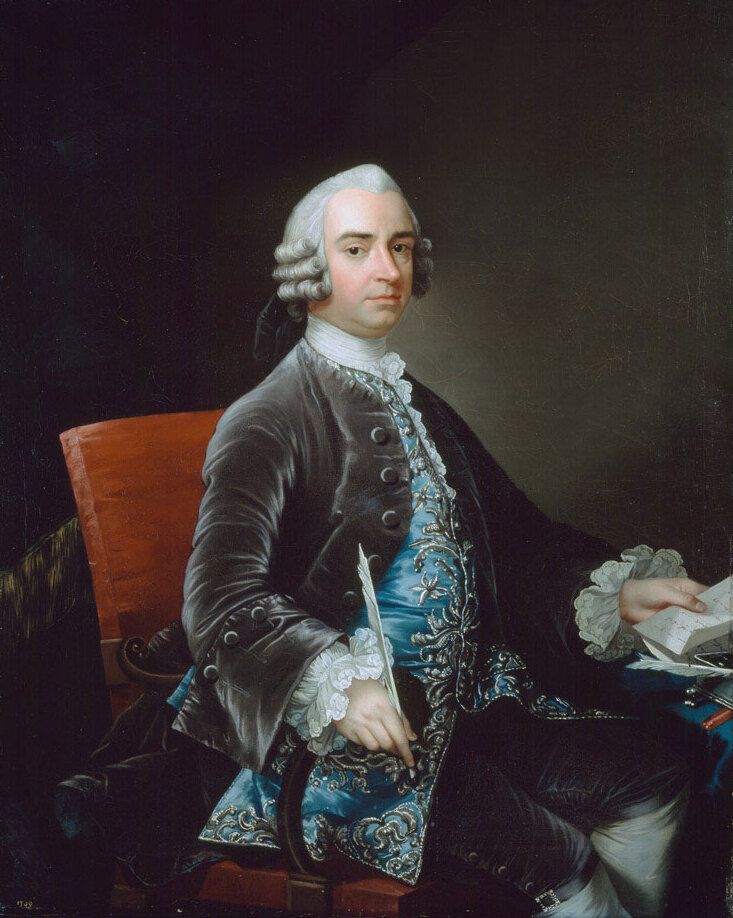
c. 1749 portrait of his father by Gabriel Mathias

Larpent was born on 14 November 1741. He was the second son of John Larpent (1710–1797), who was forty-three years in the Foreign Office, and twenty-five years chief clerk there. His mother was a daughter of James Payzant of a refugee Norman family. John was educated at Westminster, before entering the foreign office.

== Career ==
He was secretary to John Russell, 4th Duke of Bedford at the Peace of Paris in 1763, and to Francis Seymour-Conway, 1st Marquess of Hertford when Lord Lieutenant of Ireland.

In November 1778, he was appointed inspector of plays by the Marquis of Hertford, who was then Lord Chamberlain. He is said to have been strict and careful, and to have left behind him manuscript copies of all the plays submitted to the inspector from 1737 till 1824.

== Personal life ==
Larpent married, first, on 14 August 1773, Frances Western (d. 1777), eldest daughter of Maximilian Western of Cokethorpe Park, Oxfordshire. Before her death on 9 November 1777, they were the parents of two sons, including:

- Francis Seymour Larpent (1776–1845), who served as Judge-Advocate General of the British Army.

On 25 April 1782, he married, as his second wife, Anna Margaretta Porter, eldest daughter of Sir James Porter and the former Clarissa Catherine de Hochepied (eldest daughter of Elbert de Hochepied, Baron de Hochepied). Anna kept a daily diary from 1773 to 1830 that was later published in seventeen volumes. Together, they were the parents of two sons, both of whom, by licence dated 14 June 1819, added the name de Hochepied:

- John James de Hochepied Larpent (1783–1860), Consul at Antwerp.
- George Gerard de Hochepied Larpent (1786–1855), an MP for Nottingham who was created a baronet in 1841.

Larpent died 18 January 1824. On 25 March 1828, his elder son from his second marriage succeeded his maternal uncle as 7th Baron de Hochepied, the family's Hungarian title. A licence to bear the title in England had been granted on 27 September 1819.
