= List of diplomats of the United Kingdom to the Ottoman Empire =

This is a list of diplomats of the United Kingdom to the Ottoman Empire.

== Ambassadors from England ==
The first ambassador from England to the Ottoman Empire or Porte was appointed in 1583 under the reign of Elizabeth I.

- 1583-1588: William Harborne, merchant
- 1588-1598: Sir Edward Barton
- 1598-1606: Sir Henry Lello
- 1606-1611: Sir Thomas Glover
- 1611-1620: Sir Paul Pindar
- 1621-1628: Sir Thomas Roe
- 1627-1641: Sir Peter Wyche
- 1641-1646: Sir Sackville Crowe
- 1647-1661: Sir Thomas Bendish
- 1660-1667: Heneage Finch, 3rd Earl of Winchilsea
- 1668-1672: Sir Daniel Harvey
- 1672-1681: Sir John Finch
- 1681-1687: James Brydges, 8th Baron Chandos
- 1687-1691: Sir William Trumbull
- 1691: Sir William Hussey
- 1691: Sir William Harbord appointed but died en route to Constantinople
- 1692-1701: William Paget, 6th Baron Paget
- 1698 James Rushout appointed but died before he could travel to Constantinople

== Ambassadors from Great Britain ==
- 1700-1717: Sir Robert Sutton
- 1716-1718: Edward Wortley Montagu, husband of writer Lady Mary Wortley Montagu
- 1718-1730 Abraham Stanyan
- 1729-1737: George Hay, 8th Earl of Kinnoull
- 1737-1746: Everard Fawkener (departed 1742)
- 1742-1747: Stanhope Aspinwall In charge of affairs
- 1747-1762: Sir James Porter
- 1761-1764: Henry Grenville
- July–November 1765: Robert Colebrooke
- 1765-1775: John Murray
- 1775-1793: Sir Robert Ainslie
- 1793-1796: Sir Robert Liston
- 1796 - Francis James Jackson
- 1796-1799: John Spencer Smith, Minister Plenipotentiary

== Ambassadors from the United Kingdom ==
- 1799-1803: Thomas Bruce, 7th Earl of Elgin
- 1803 (Jan-May): Alexander Straton (minister plenipotentiary)
- 1803-1804: William Drummond
- 1804-1807: Charles Arbuthnot
- 1807-1809 Sir Arthur Paget
- 1808 and 1809: Sir Robert Adair special mission in 1808, Ambassador in 1809
- 1809-1812: Stratford Canning (chargé d'affaires in the absence of an ambassador during the Napoleonic Wars)
- 1812-1820: Sir Robert Liston (his second term)
- March–August 1820 Bartholomew Frere - minister plenipotentiary
- 1820-1824: Percy Clinton, Viscount Strangford
- 1824-1825: William Turner - minister plenipotentiary
- 1825-1827: Stratford Canning (again)
- 1827-1832: (British Embassy was withdrawn following the Battle of Navarino), during this period Sir Robert Gordon was envoy extraordinary and John Hobart Caradoc led a special mission to Greece and Egypt. Canning returned for a period in 1831-32 for the conferences to determine the borders of Greece, with John Henry Mandeville as minister-plenipotentiary.
- 1832-1841: John, Lord Ponsonby
- Mar-Oct 1841: Charles Bankhead minister-plenipotentiary
- 1841-1858: Stratford Canning, 1st Viscount Stratford de Redcliffe (again) with Henry Richard Charles Wellesley as minister-plenipotentiary in 1845
- 1858-1865: Sir Henry Bulwer
- 1865-1867: Richard Lyons, 1st Baron Lyons
- 1867-1877: Sir Henry Elliot-Murray-Kynynmound
- 1877-1880: Sir Henry Layard
- May 1880: George Joachim Goschen (special ambassador)
- 1881-1884: Frederick Hamilton-Temple-Blackwood, 1st Earl of Dufferin
- 1884-1886: Sir Edward Thornton
- 1886-1891: Sir William White
- 1891-1893: Sir Clare Ford
- 1893-1898: Sir Philip Currie
- 1898-1908: Sir Nicholas O'Conor-Don
- Apr–Jul 1908: Sir George Head Barclay
- 1908-1913: Sir Gerard Lowther, 1st Baronet
- 1913-1914: Sir Louis Mallet
- 1914-1918: no diplomatic relations due to World War I
- 1918-1919: Somerset Gough-Calthorpe (British High Commissioner), also Commander-in-Chief of the Mediterranean Fleet
- 1919-1920: John de Robeck (British High Commissioner), also Commander-in-Chief of the Mediterranean Fleet
- 1920-1923: Sir Horace Rumbold, 9th Baronet (British High Commissioner at Constantinople). 1923-1924: British representative to Turkey.

From 1925 onwards, following the formation of the Republic of Turkey, see: List of ambassadors of the United Kingdom to Turkey

== List of other prominent British residents ==
- 1880s: Francis Richard Plunkett served as Diplomatic Secretary
- 1876: Robert Gascoyne-Cecil, 3rd Marquess of Salisbury - Represented Britain at the Six Powers Constantinople Conference.
- late 19th century: Sir Edgar Vincent, Director-General of the Imperial Ottoman Bank
- 17th century: Sir Paul Rycault - Secretary to the Ambassador and Consul in Smyrna.
- Thomas Dallam: organ maker
- William Biddulph: Protestant chaplain in Aleppo
- In 1653 the Commonwealth appointed one Richard Lawrence as agent
- 1668-1671: Sir George Etherege, restoration rake and writer, secretary to Daniel Harvey
