= Morier =

Morier is a surname, and may refer to:

- David Morier (1705?–1770), Anglo-Swiss painter
- David Richard Morier (1784-1877), British diplomat
- Henri Morier (1910–2004), Swiss literary scholar
- Isaac Morier (1750-1817), British diplomat
- James Justinian Morier (1780–1849), British diplomat and author
- John Philip Morier (1776-1853), British diplomat
- Nicole Morier, American singer-songwriter
- Robert Morier (1826–1893), British diplomat
- William Morier (1790-1864), British naval officer
