= John Philip Morier =

British diplomat (1776–1853)

Envoy Extraordinary and Minister Plenipotentiary to the Kingdom of Saxony
- In office 5 February 1816 – 5 January 1825
- Preceded by: Henry Williams-Wynn
- Succeeded by: George William Chad

Personal details
- Born: 9 November 1776 Smyrna, Ottoman Empire
- Died: 20 August 1853 (aged 76) London, England
- Spouse: Horatia Maria Frances Seymour (m. 1814; died 1853)
- Relations: James Morier (brother); David Morier (brother); William Morier (brother)
- Children: 7
- Parent(s): Isaac Morier; Clara van Lennep

John Philip Morier (9 November 1776 – 20 August 1853) was a British diplomat.

== Early life ==
Morier was born at Smyrna 9 November 1776. He was the eldest of four sons of Isaac Morier and Clara van Lennep, daughter of the Dutch consul-general and president of the Dutch Levant Company. His younger brothers were James Justinian Morier, David Richard Morier and William Morier. His father was an agent of the East India Company and the British consul-general of the Levant Company at Constantinople.

He was known as Jack. The family returned to England in 1787, where he had school education under Samuel Jay at Greenwich, Andover and Eagle House, Wimbledon under Thomas Lancaster. He was placed in his father's counting house in 1793.

== Career ==
=== Diplomat in the East Mediterranean ===
In 1794 Morier returned to Smyrna, working in the family business there. He was attached to the embassy at Constantinople on 5 April 1799, where he acted as private secretary to the ambassador, Thomas Bruce, 7th Earl of Elgin.

Morier was despatched by Elgin on 22 December 1799 on special service of observation to Egypt. Elgin in fact wanted to take in the situation which he had faced on arrival, of William Sidney Smith running the negotiations between the Ottomans and the French. Morier was accompany the Grand Vizier in the Turkish expedition against General Jean Baptiste Kléber, whom Napoleon had left to hold the country. Morier joined the Turkish army at Arish, on the Egyptian frontier, 31 January 1800, and remained with it until July.

In March 1800 Morier was with the Grand Vizier, but felt it essential to inform Smith of the situation. He went to Damietta and set off in a small boat, searching for HMS Tigre; but was driven ashore and taken prisoner by the French. Moved to Rosetta and then Alexandria, he was able to benefit from a hostage exchange and was allowed to proceed by the French.

In December 1803 Morier was appointed consul-general in Albania, where the policy of Ali Pasha of Joannina, a semi-independent Ottoman vassal, was an ongoing concern for British and French diplomacy. This posting was new, and was also a move to restrict the freedom of action of the Levant Company; and in public the Company acquiesced. In 1805, however, there was a clash over duties collected by the Company's representative at Patras.

=== Later life ===
In April 1810 Morier was promoted to be secretary of legation at Washington DC, where Augustus Foster in time arrived with fuller powers. Morier was running the legation, however, from August 1810; the U.S. government took his status as an affront, and withdrew William Pinkney from London in 1811, before Foster was appointed. Morier's views in a letter on the West Florida Controversy were found provocative by President James Madison. Congress debated letters from Morier, and correspondence between Vicente Folch y Juan and John McKee, behind closed doors, in January 1811; and it passed a bill Madison had requested, on excluding foreign powers from Florida.

In October 1811 Morier was gazetted a commissioner in Spanish America, with George Cockburn and Charles Stuart (but Thomas Sydenham took Stuart's place). In 1814 he was in Norway.

On his return to England, Morier became for a while acting under-secretary of state for foreign affairs in August 1815. On 5 February 1816 he was appointed envoy extraordinary to the court of Saxony at Dresden, a post he held till his retirement, on pension, 5 January 1825.

=== Works ===
Morier published Memoir of a Campaign with the Ottoman Army in Egypt from February to July 1800 (London, 1801).

== Personal life ==
On 3 December 1814, Morier was married to Horatia Maria Frances Seymour (c. 1796–1853), eldest daughter of Lord Hugh Seymour (the youngest son of the 1st Marquess of Hertford) and Lady Anne Horatia Waldegrave (a daughter of the 2nd Earl Waldegrave). They had seven daughters, of whom:

- Frances Horatia Morier (1815–1906), who married the Rev. Hon. Edward Harbottle Grimston, an MP for St Albans and rector of Pebmarsh who was a son of James Walter Grimston, 1st Earl of Verulam, on 15 June 1842.
- Horatia Isabella Harriet Morier (1819–1915), who married Algernon St Maur, 14th Duke of Somerset, third son of Edward St Maur, 11th Duke of Somerset and Lady Charlotte Hamilton (daughter of the 9th Duke of Hamilton), in 1845.
- Katherine Georgina Morier (1821–1879), who married the Rev. Hon. Francis Sylvester Grimston, another son of the 1st Earl of Verulam and rector of Wakes Colne, on 1 February 1847.

Morier died in London on 20 August 1853. His widow survived him by only six days, before her own death.

== Notes ==
Attribution

This article incorporates text from a publication now in the public domain: Lee, Sidney, ed. (1894). "Morier, John Philip". Dictionary of National Biography. Vol. 39. London: Smith, Elder & Co.
