= Zohrab =

Zohrab may refer to:

== First name ==
- Zohrab Mnatsakanyan, Armenian diplomat and Deputy Minister of Foreign Affairs

== Last name ==
- Doug Zohrab, (1917–2008), New Zealand diplomat and public servant
- Krikor Zohrab (or Grigor Zohrap) (1861–1915), influential Armenian writer, politician, lawyer and member of parliament in the Ottoman Council. Assassinated during the Armenian genocide in 1915

== Fiction ==
- Zohrab the Hostage, an 1832 novel by James Justinian Morier

== See also ==
- Rustam and Zohrab, the third mugham opera by Uzeyir Hajibeyov
- Zöhrabkənd, village in the Davachi Rayon of Azerbaijan
- Zohrabai, also Zohrabai Agrewali (1868–1913), one of the most noted and influential singers of Hindustani Classical Music from the early 1900s
