= Douglas Craven Phillott =

Army officer, linguist, translator

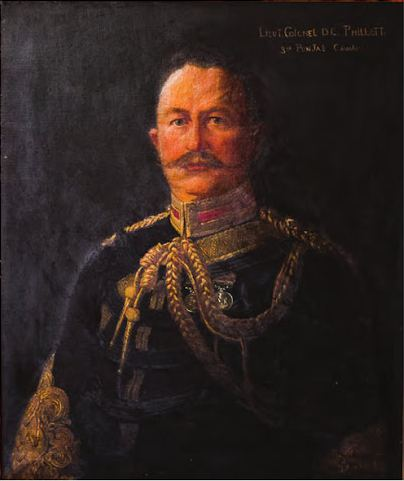
Portrait in Felsted School c. 1906

Lieutenant-Colonel Douglas Craven Phillott (28 June 1860 - 11 September 1930) was a British army officer who served in India and later as Consul in Persia. A scholar of Urdu, Persian and Hindustani, he published numerous translations of literary and historical works. He was also interested in falconry and wrote a translation of a Persian treatise on the subject.

== Biography ==
Phillott, born in London, was the third son of Lt. Col. Henry Rodney Phillott of the Indian army and Lilias Syme. He went to school in Felsted School in Essex from 1874 to 1878 before received commission to the Indian army on 14 January 1880 and later trained at Sandhurst. He saw action in the campaigns in Zhob Valley, Hazara and received the General Service Medal in 1891. He also served in the Ublan Pass operation at Samana and in the Kurram valley for which he received a medal with two clasps. He became lieutenant on 1 July 1881, captain on 14 January 1891, major on 14 January 1900, and lieutenant-colonel on 14 January 1906. He retired in 1906 from the 3rd Punjab Cavalry (later 23rd) and became Secretary to the Board of Examiners in Calcutta. He served as a Consul in Persia (Iran) from around 1901 to 1903.

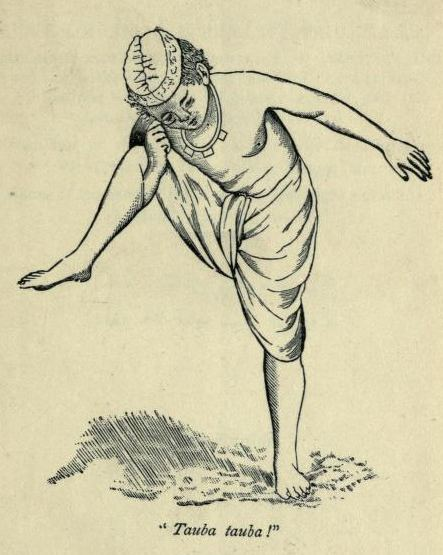
Frontispiece to Hindustani Manual (1913) showing an oriental posture of atonement and apology

During the First World War, he served as chief censor for prisoners in Cairo and Port Said. He then returned to England living in Maida Vale and later Felsted and was examiner in Urdu and Persian at the University of Cambridge until his death in 1930.

Phillott published on Persian grammar, Egyptian Arabic and on falconry. He also contributed a few notes on ornithology. Phillott was elected member of the Asiatic Society of Bengal in November 1889 and a fellow in 1910; and he published in its journal and served as secretary to the Philological Committee. He also served as vice president of the Hindi ek-lipi society which aimed to standardize the use of Devanagari.

He translated several works into English, popular among which was From Sepoy to Subedar, a work supposedly written by an Indian soldier and included reminiscences of the 1857 mutiny. He published The Bāz-nāma-yi Nāṣirī, a Persian treatise on falconry which was a major work on the traditional falconry of Iran as well as a translation of the Ain-i-Akbari. He also played a major role in the publication of a Persian translation of The Adventures of Hajji Baba of Ispahan written by James Justinian Morier. The translation, which was originally done by Mirza Habib Esfahani, was wrongly attributed to Sheykh Ahmad Ruhi Kermani whose image appeared as the frontispiece of the book. Research has shown that Esfahani's translation, though highly praised for its fluency and innovations, included editorial additions and modifications to suggest that Persia was backward, ruled by despots unlike the advanced culture of Constantinople. The aim of Esfahani is unclear but is thought to be politically motivated satire. Phillott received an honorary Ph.D. from the Calcutta University in 1912.

== Publications ==
Some of the books edited, translated and written by Phillott include:

- The Adventures of Haji Baba of Ispahan (1905)
- The Baz-nama-yi Nasiri, a Persian treatise on falconry (1908)
- Hindustani Stumbling Blocks (1909)
- Annotated English translation of Urdu roz-marra, or "Every-day Urdu", the text-book for the lower standard examination in Hindustani (1911)
- The Faras-nāma-e Rangīn : or, The book of the horse (1911) (alternate)
- The Faras-Nama of Hashimi (1910) (edited)
- Khazina-e Muhawarat; or Urdu idioms (1912)
- Hindustani Manual (1913 2e) (1918)
- Colloquial English-Persian dictionary in the Roman character, containing all English words in common use with their meanings in modern Persian, with numerous examples
- Higher Persian Grammar (1919)

Publications in journals include those on falconry, birds and references in Persian literature:

- Phillott, D. C. (1906). "Note on the Common Kestril (Tinnunculus alaudarius)". Journal of the Asiatic Society of Bengal. 2: 527–528.
- Phillott, D. C. (1906). "Note on the Humá or Lammergeyer". Journal of the Asiatic Society of Bengal. 2: 532–533.
- Phillott, D. C. (1907). "Notes on the Lagar Falcon (Falco jugger)". Journal of the Asiatic Society of Bengal. 3: 39–45.
- Phillott, D. C. (1907). "Notes on the Shunqár Falcon". Journal of the Asiatic Society of Bengal. 3: 113–114.
- Phillott, D. C. (1907). "Methods of catching wild fowl, herons and other water birds in the Panjab, Sindh and Kashmir". Journal of the Asiatic Society of Bengal. 3: 433–439.
- Phillott, D. C. (1907). "Note on the Blue or Common Heron (Ardea Cinerea)". Journal of the Asiatic Society of Bengal. 3: 553–555.
- Phillott, D. C. (1907). "Note on the Indian Hawk-bells". Journal of the Asiatic Society of Bengal. 3: 557.
- Phillott, D. C. (1907). "Note on the Common Raven - Corvus corax". Journal of the Asiatic Society of Bengal. 3: 115–117.
- Phillott, D. C. (1907). "Note on the Saker or Cherrug Falcon (F. Cherrug)". Journal of the Asiatic Society of Bengal. 3: 179–192.
- Phillott, D. C. (1907). "Note on the Red-headed Merlin (Æsalon chicquera)". Journal of the Asiatic Society of Bengal. 3 (6): 395–399.
- Phillott, D. C.; Azoo, R. F. (1907). "Chapters on hunting dogs and cheetas, being an extract from the 'Kitab-ul-Bazyarah', a treatise on Falconry, by Ibn Kushájim, an Arab writer of the tenth century". Journal of the Asiatic Society of Bengal. 3: 47–50.
- Phillott, D. C.; Azoo, R. F. (1907). "Some birds and other animals that have been metamorphosed [being an extract from the Kitáb'l-Jamharah fi 'ilmi'l-Bazyarah, an Arabic manuscript, No. 865, in the Library of the Asiatic Society of Bengal]". Journal of the Asiatic Society of Bengal. 3: 139–143.
- Phillott, D. C.; Azoo, R. F. (1907). "Things which the owners of Hawks should avoid, being an extract from the Kitab'l-Jamharah fi'Ilmi'l-Bazyarah". Journal of the Asiatic Society of Bengal. 3: 401–403.
- Phillott, D. C. (1907). "Note on the Common Merlin (Æsalon regulus)". Journal of the Asiatic Society of Bengal. 3: 601–602.
- Phillott, D. C. (1907). "Indian Hawking-gloves". Journal of the Asiatic Society of Bengal. 3: 603–608.
- Phillott, D. C. (1908). "Note on the Drum in Falconry". Journal of the Asiatic Society of Bengal. 4: 159–164.
- Phillott, D. C. (1908). "Eastern hoods for hawks". Journal of the Asiatic Society of Bengal. 4: 165–166.
- Phillott, D. C. (1908). "Note on the Peregrine Falcon (Falco peregrinus)". Journal of the Asiatic Society of Bengal. 4: 259–265.
- Phillott, D. C.; Banerjee, Gobin Lal (1908). "Hindustani-English Vocabulary of Indian birds". Journal of the Asiatic Society of Bengal. 4: 55–79.
- Phillott, D. C. (1910). "Murgh-Náma". Journal of the Asiatic Society of Bengal. 6: 73–91.
- Phillott, D. C. (1910). "Vocabulary of technical falconry terms in Urdu, Persian, and Arabic". Journal of the Asiatic Society of Bengal. 6: 315–380.
