= Battle of Pantelleria (1586) =

Part of the Anglo–Spanish War

- Part of the Anglo–Spanish War
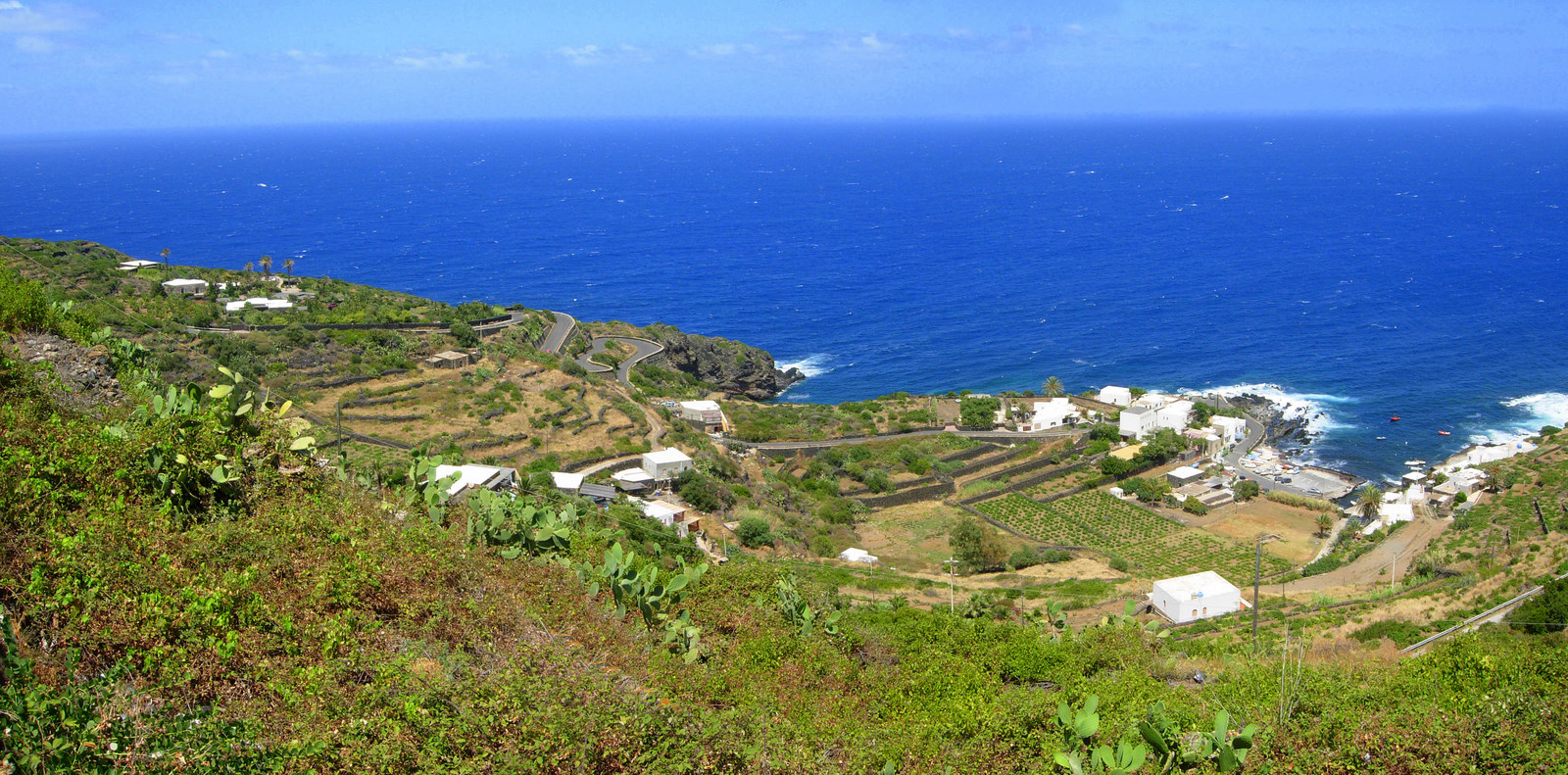
- Island of Pantelleria coast: The English ships came close to shore for their protection.
Date	13 July 1586
Location	Off Pantelleria, Mediterranean
Result	English victory

Belligerents
Spain (Sovereign Military Order of Malta) Hospitaller Malta	England: Levant Company

Commanders and leaders
Pedro de Leyva	Edward Wilkinson

Strength
11 galleys 2 frigates	5 armed merchant galleons & vessels

Casualties and losses
Many galleys severely damaged, Heavy casualties	2 killed and 15 wounded

The Battle of Pantelleria (1586), also known as the Fight at Pantalarea was a naval engagement during the Anglo–Spanish War off the island of Pantelleria on 13 July 1586. The encounter was between an English armed merchant fleet of five ships of the Levant Company in convoy under Edward Wilkinson and a fleet of eleven Spanish and Maltese galleys under Don Pedro de Leyva. The English managed to repel all the attacks and returned home unmolested. Although minor, the battle had significant consequences in testing English armaments used against the Spanish Armada two years later when England was under threat of invasion.

== Background ==
The Company of Merchants of the Levant (or the Turkey Company) had been trading in the Mediterranean since 1580 after a successful petition to Queen Elizabeth I. They had established "factories" in Aleppo (its headquarters), as well as in Constantinople, Alexandria, and Smyrna. After the Treaty of Nonsuch in 1585 and the execution of Mary, Queen of Scots, in February 1587, Philip II of Spain decided to invade England and war was declared. As a result, the Levant company armed their ships, funded by the English crown.

Philip II's maritime force lay mainly within the Straits of Gibraltar where two squadrons of galleys were cruising under Giovanni Andrea Doria. Further in was the Sicilian squadron, composed of Spanish and Maltese galleys, under Captain-General Don Pedro de Leyva (who had replaced Don Alonso Martinez de Leyva the previous year). Both Doria and Pedro de Leyva had orders to intercept English merchant fleets.

Five of the Levant company's ships left London in November 1585 – the 300 ton galleon Merchant Royal (being head of the fleet) under "acting admiral" Edward Wilkinson and the William and John were bound for Tripoli and the Toby for Constantinople. The Susan and the 300 ton armed merchant galleon Edward Bonaventure were bound for Venice. After completing their trading ventures, the ships met at Zante (Zakynthos) and after provisioning they set out for home together.

== Encounter ==
On 13 July 1586, near the island of Pantelleria, between Tunis and Sicily, the English fleet sighted a number of ships that turned out to be galleys, eleven in all supported by two frigates. Wilkinson ordered his ships to sail close to the coast of the island so that they could not be surrounded and then ordered them to be ready for action. The ships' cannons, specifically sakers, culverins, and demi culverins, would show how well they fared since they had yet to be tested at sea in ship-to-ship combat in English service.

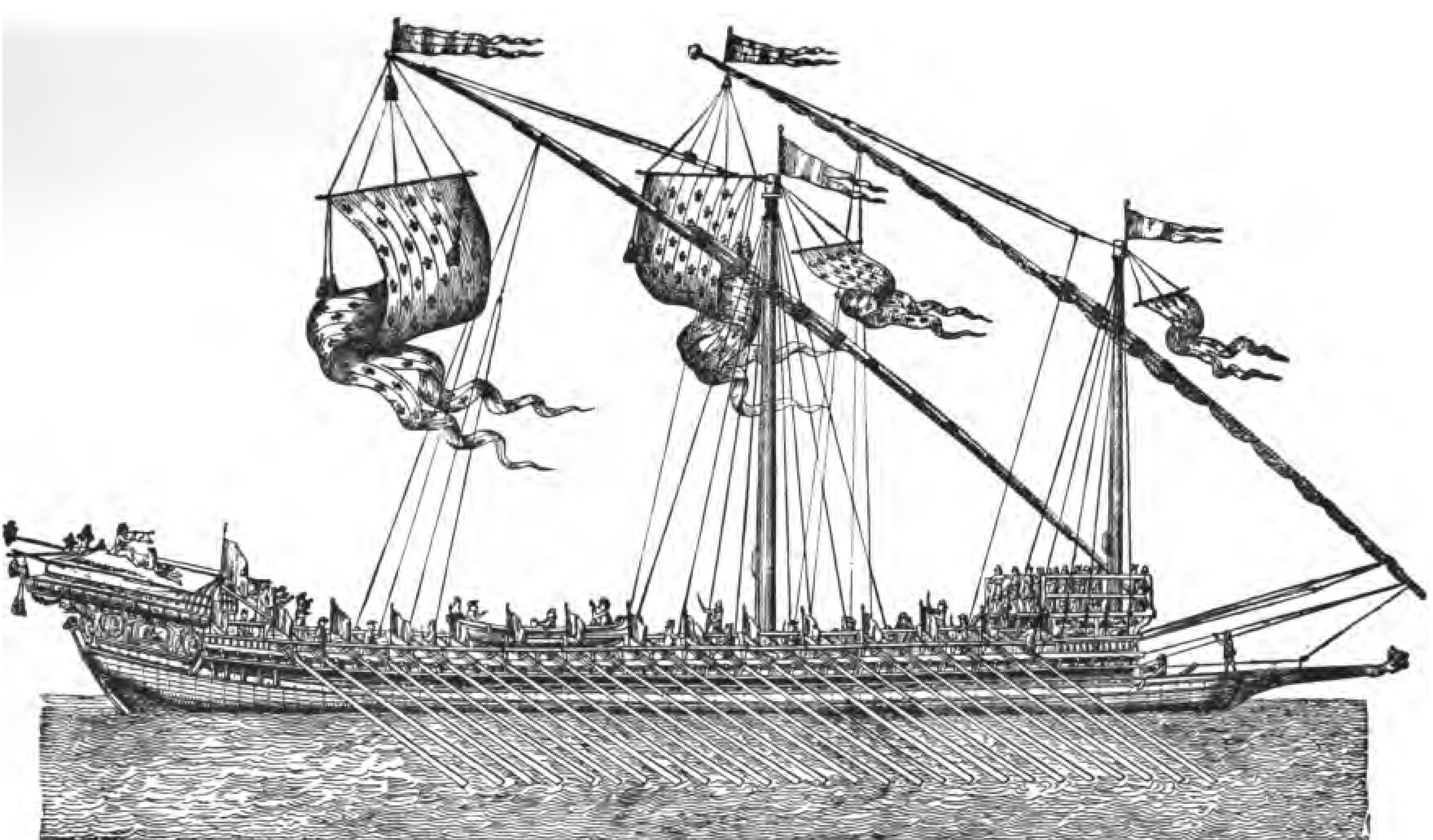
A Spanish galley of the 16th century

Don Pedro de Leyva closed in and sent a messenger aboard the Merchant Royal; they asked what they were doing and where they had come from. The English explained that trade had bought them to Turkey and they were returning home to England. De Leyva then demanded that they acknowledge their duty and obedience to the Spanish king but this demand was flatly refused by Wilkinson. After more demands were refused, De Leyva sent an ultimatum they would, 'either be sunk or be escorted into port' but he was rebuffed once more and the two fleets prepared for battle.

=== Battle ===
The admiral's galley fired the first shot which was responded to by a culverin from the Merchant Royal and the action began. Each English ship matched itself with two Spanish galleys and fighting became bitter with the Spanish attempting to board, which was the galleys' principal military tactic. The English however kept up a steady rate of fire from their recently acquired twenty-pounder culverins (of which there were four in each ship) and twelve-pounder demi-culverins (ten in each ship) as well as short-range perriers.

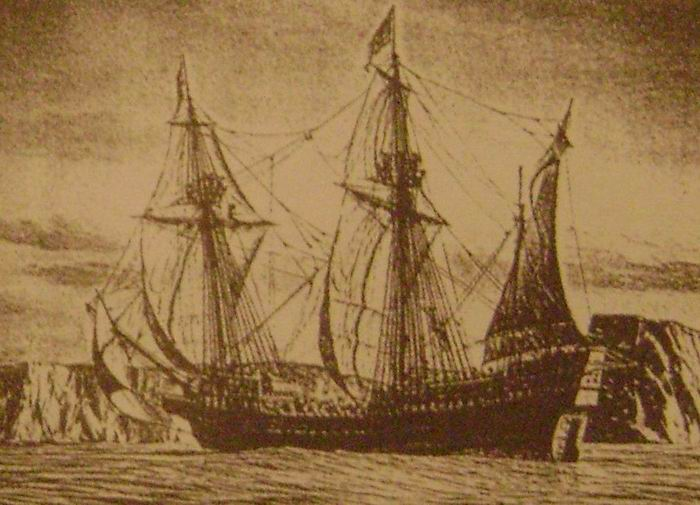
English Galleon Edward Bonaventure

The Spanish and Maltese galleys could not get close enough to the English ships to use their big fifty-pounder guns, mounted in the waist line, without being seriously damaged. One galley did get close enough to fire two shots, which caused the only English casualties in the Susan, before being forced off by her guns. William and John was very nearly a casualty after briefly grounding as the English were hugging the shoreline, but the wind was strong enough to carry the ship forward to safety.

Soon de Leyva realized the attack was causing far more harm to his galleys and frigates than to the English. Even de Leyva's flag galley sustained heavy damage and soon it warped away from the fight; after a few hours more fighting the rest of the Spanish ships did likewise. Most had sustained damage and some were struggling to stay afloat, while the English edged away from the coast still in convoy, headed west.

== Aftermath ==
The battle, which had lasted nearly five hours, had ended and the galleys withdrew to the nearest port in Sicily for repairs. In order to keep his flagship afloat, Leyva had to lash it together with two of his other seriously damaged galleys.

After fending off the Spanish attack, the English found they had only two killed and fifteen wounded, principally from the Susan, and there was no serious damage to any of their ships. They put into Algiers for supplies, and then successfully ran the gauntlet of a second group of Spanish galleys which was waiting for them in the Gibraltar straits. No fight took place as the English sailed through with the help of a heavy mist; as the galleys saw them they tried to catch up, but it was too late.

The English returned home safely and news of the battle soon reached Cairo where the company men were in conference on agreeing trade; they received the news with alarm but were ecstatic with the results. Learning from the battle, they agreed to adopt the same strategy for every Levant Company trading mission.

The Levant Company now knew what to do when entering hostile waters most notably in the Strait of Gibraltar. Here in 1590 an attempt was made by the Spanish on the same company ships but were repelled and again nearly a year later, that led to the same outcome. As a result of the battle the Royal Navy made heavy use of the Levant Company ships, especially when it came to the Spanish Armada in 1588. In terms of fighting it was a successful test for the future of the fighting ship of the line and the "death knell" of the war galley.

== See also ==
- Battle of the Strait of Gibraltar (1590)
- Battle of the Strait of Gibraltar (1591)
- Operation Corkscrew
