= Governor Wilkinson =

Governor Wilkinson may refer to:

- Charles Edmund Wilkinson (1801–1870), Acting Governor of British Ceylon in 1860
- Richard James Wilkinson (1867–1941), Governor of Sierra Leone from 1916 to 1922
