= Zohrab the Hostage =

1832 novel

- Author: James Justinian Morier
- Language: English
- Genre: Adventure
- Publisher: Richard Bentley
- Publication date: 1832
- Publication place: United Kingdom
- Media type: Print

Zohrab the Hostage is an 1832 adventure novel by the British traveller and writer James Justinian Morier. Morier had travelled extensively across Persia and enjoyed popular success with his 1824 novel Hajji Baba and its sequel The Adventures of Hajji Baba of Ispahan in England. It was published in three volumes by Richard Bentley.

== Bibliography ==
- Harper, Graeme. Comedy, Fantasy and Colonialism. A&C Black, 2002.
- Watt, James. British Orientalisms, 1759–1835. Cambridge University Press, 2019.
