= Operation Hajji Baba =

USAF Humanitarian Operation

Operation Hajji Baba was a humanitarian airlift operation performed by the United States Air Force between 25 and 29 August 1952. The mission of the operation was to airlift Hajj pilgrims stranded in Beirut, Lebanon to Jeddah, Saudi Arabia before the closing of the gates to Mecca.

The name for the operation was derived from the title of the book The Adventures of Hajji Baba of Ispahan, written by James Justinian Morier in 1824.

== Background ==
Several thousand Muslim pilgrims making the annual Hajj to the Muslim holy city of Mecca became stranded in Beirut, Lebanon when they arrived to find their flights to Saudi Arabia had been grossly overbooked. Saeb Salam, a member of the Parliament of Lebanon and future prime minister, saw the potential for a minor humanitarian crisis in the making. Most of the stranded travelers were poor and had spent their life savings on what was basically a once-in-a-lifetime chance to make the holy pilgrimage to Mecca. Furthermore, the vast majority of the pilgrims did not speak the local language. These two issues combined into a very real possibility that they would not be able to find nor afford adequate food, water, and accommodations.

Salam quickly formed an idea to have the pilgrims airlifted out of Beirut and into Saudi Arabia. However, with all of the airlines serving Beirut overbooked, he had to look elsewhere. He settled on the US Air Force and, putting aside the fact that the US had supported Israel during the Mideast War of 1948, Salaam reached out to the US ambassador in Beirut, Harold B. Minor, on 21 August for help. Minor quickly realized the positive diplomatic benefits this assistance could have and he promptly forwarded the request to his superiors.

== Prelude ==
The request was eventually approved by then-Secretary of Defense Robert A. Lovett and on 23 August 1952, the alert orders for the operation were sent to two airlift wings, the 1602nd Air Transport Wing at Wiesbaden Air Base, West Germany and the 1603rd Air Transport Wing at Wheelus Air Base, Libya. The 1602nd tasked the 86th Air Transport Squadron and 1629th Support Squadron at Rhein-Main Air Base, West Germany, to take part in the operation, while the 1603rd tasked the 41st Air Transport Squadron. Brigadier General Wentworth Goss, commanding general of the 1602nd, was appointed as commanding officer for this task force.

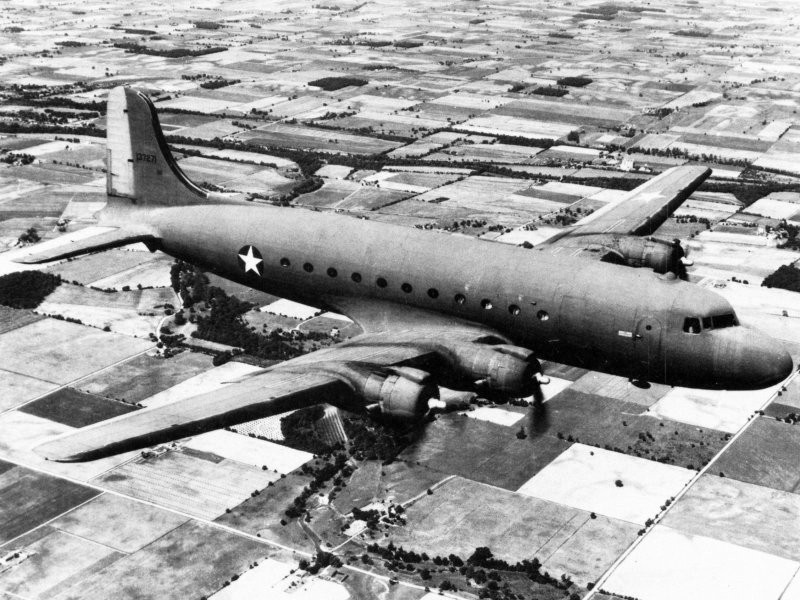
C-54 Skymaster

Goss assembled a team of 209 personnel, 80 officers and 129 enlisted members, to operate and maintain the 12 Douglas C-54 Skymaster aircraft that would be ferrying the pilgrims. Except for a small team of two officers and two airmen in Jeddah, the entire team would be based out of the Beirut airport.

Goss' plan called for each C-54 to carry 50 passengers plus double crew from Beirut to Jeddah, on a route that would take them over Damascus, Syria, Amman, Jordan and a point on the Red Sea just north of Jeddah. This circuitous route was required because Israel would not grant overflight permission due to the nature of the operation. Flying time would be about five hours.

Once the passengers were off-loaded in Jeddah, the ground crew would quickly service the plane and it would begin its return trip to Beirut within 45 minutes of landing. This short turn-around time was due partly to the lack of need for refueling; each C-54 would carry enough fuel (2,700 gallons) to make the round trip. Once the aircraft returned to Beirut, it would be fully inspected and refueled then returned to service all within 90 minutes of landing. If the aircraft was found to be unserviceable, it would be pulled from the flight schedule for repair and a spare aircraft would substitute.

By 25 August, Goss had his team and aircraft in place. At 0700 that morning, the operation officially began.

== Operation ==
The first load of 50 passengers was delayed when a passport and security problem temporarily halted boarding. This issue was caused by the failure of local authorities to properly process the pilgrims for the American (versus commercial airline) aircraft. A new process was rapidly created with the help of the three major airlines serving the Beirut airport. Because these airlines already had all of the initial paperwork completed, they were able to coordinate the release of the passengers in blocks of 50 thus speeding up the security and passport processing and allowing boarding to continue normally.

Once this initial problem was solved, operations flowed smoothly. That is until the team realized they would have to transport more than the number of passengers they were originally told. Original estimates put the airlift requirements at about 1,500 passengers. That number was almost half of what the actual passenger load really was. This had the potential of negating any effect the mission may have since, given the resources and time available, there was no way the operation could transport all of the stranded pilgrims before Saudi Arabia closed the gates to Mecca on 27 August. Goss immediately voiced his concern to his superiors and the US State Department made an impassioned plea to the Saudi government to keep the gates open for one extra day.

Not only did the Saudi government heed the request, but they also went beyond it by keeping the gates open for two extra days. The last flight of the operation left Beirut at 0522 on 29 August 1952. When it completed its transit and landed in Jeddah, Operation Hajji Baba ended. During the four days of the operation, the C-54s had transported 3,763 passengers in the course of 75 round-trips covering over 117,000 miles. No aircraft or crew were lost during the operation.

== Aftermath ==
Operation Hajji Baba was a complete success in all respects. Having learned valuable lessons during the Berlin Airlift three years prior, the US Air Force and its Military Air Transport Service were able to implement a reliable and efficient airlift in an amazingly short amount of time. The operation exceeded its intended mission by transporting nearly twice the number of passengers than originally planned for and did so without injury or loss of equipment.

Even though the very anti-Western Ayatollah Seyyed Abol-Ghasem Kashani, a high profile member of the Iranian Parliament, used his flight on one of the C-54s as an opportunity to publicly voice his opposition to Western involvement in the Middle East, the reaction within the Islamic media was generally favorable with even the most hard-line press outlets giving some kind words to the effort.

In the US, Life magazine published a four-page pictorial featuring photos taken during the operation. The state department produced a special booklet entitled Pilgrim Journey along with a documentary film, each recording different aspects of the operation.

Beyond the initial publicity and news coverage of the event, Operation Hajji Baba has faded into the history books and remains only a minor footnote in the history of the humanitarian operations conducted by the US Air Force.
