= Sir Francis Vincent, 10th Baronet =

English Whig politician

Sir Francis Vincent, Bt

Member of Parliament for St Albans
- In office 1831–1835 Serving with Richard Godson, Henry George Ward
- Preceded by: Viscount Grimston; Charles Tennant
- Succeeded by: Edward Grimston; Henry George Ward

Personal details
- Born: 3 March 1803
- Died: 6 July 1880 (aged 77)
- Party: Whig
- Spouse: Augusta Elizabeth Chiswell (m. 1824)
- Relations: Edward Bouverie (grandfather); Edward Bouverie Jr. (uncle); Henry Bouverie (uncle); John Bouverie (uncle)
- Children: Blanche Vincent
- Parent(s): Sir Francis Vincent, 9th Baronet; Jane Bouverie Vincent
- Education: Eton College

Sir Francis Vincent, 10th Baronet (3 March 1803 – 6 July 1880) was an English Whig politician.

== Early life ==
Vincent was born in Bloomsbury on 3 March 1803. He was a son of Sir Francis Vincent, 9th Baronet and Jane (née Bouverie) Vincent. He "belonged to a very old family, which had possessed land in Leicestershire in the early fourteenth century, migrated to Northamptonshire and settled in Surrey, where the estate of Stoke d’Abernon, near Leatherhead, came into their hands by marriage into the Lyfield family."

His paternal grandparents were Sir Francis Vincent, 8th Baronet, the British Ambassador to Venice in 1790 (and brother of Henry Dormer Vincent) and the former Mary Muilman-Trench Chiswell, daughter and heiress of Richard Muilman Trench Chiswell, whose Essex estate at Debden thus came to the Vincents. His maternal grandparents were the Hon. Edward Bouverie, MP (son of Jacob Bouverie, 1st Viscount Folkestone) and the celebrated hostess Harriet Fawkener (daughter of Sir Everard Fawkener). Among his maternal family were uncles Edward Bouverie Jr. of Delapré Abbey, Lieut.-Gen. Sir Henry Frederick Bouverie, and John Bouverie, rector at Midhurst.

Vincent graduated from Eton College in 1817. After Eton, he had a "perfunctory career in the cavalry."

== Career ==
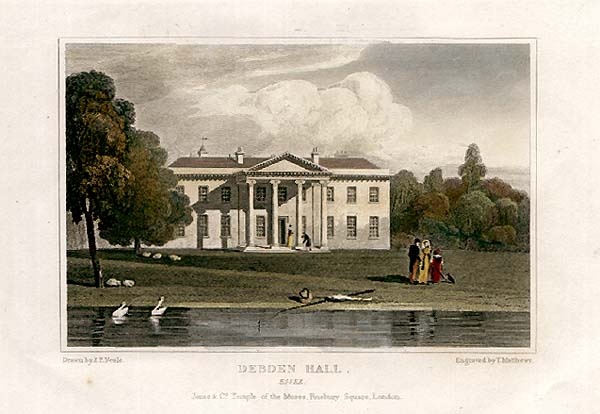
Debden Hall, Uttlesford

He was elected at the 1831 general election as one of the two Members of Parliament (MPs) for the borough of St Albans in Hertfordshire. He was re-elected in 1832, and held the seat until the 1835 general election, when he did not stand again.

=== Later life ===
After leaving the House of Commons, he became the author of "triple-decker, silver fork novels," producing Arundel, a Tale of the French Revolution in 1840, and four others between 1867 and 1872. Vincent traveled around the fashionable vacation spots of Europe, including Baden-Baden, where the opening scene of his last novel, The Fitful Fever of a Life, was set in a gambling hall. According to Captain Gronow, Vincent was a gambler who "contrived to get rid of his magnificent property and then disappeared from society".

== Personal life ==
On 10 May 1824, He married Augusta Elizabeth Herbert (c. 1805–1876), the only child of Charles Herbert. Together, they were the parents of one child:

- Blanche Vincent (1829–1914), who married John Raymond Cely-Trevilian (1841–1884), son of Maj. Maurice Cely Trevilian.

Vincent died intestate on 6 July 1880, Debden Hall passed to his daughter Blanche, who sold it to William Fuller-Maitland two years later. As he died without male issue, the baronetcy was inherited by his grand-uncle Henry Dormer Vincent's son, the Rev. Frederick Vincent, himself father of the 12th, 15th and 16th (and last) Baronets (who was Edgar Vincent, 1st Viscount D'Abernon).

Parliament of the United Kingdom
Preceded by Viscount Grimston; Charles Tennant	Member of Parliament for St Albans; 1831 – 1835; With: Richard Godson 1831–1832; Henry George Ward 1832–1837	Succeeded by Edward Grimston; Henry George Ward
Baronetage of England
Preceded by Francis Vincent	Baronet (of Stoke d'Abernon, Surrey); 1809–1880	Succeeded by Frederick Vincent
