= Henry George Ward =

English diplomat, politician and colonial administrator

Sir Henry George Ward GCMG
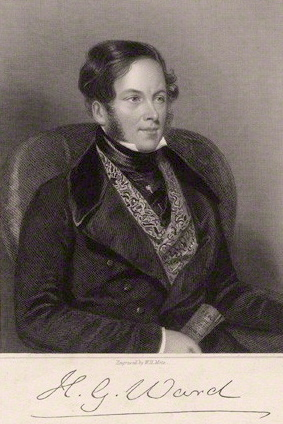
- Henry George Ward, 1842 engraving by William Henry Mote, after James Holmes.

11th Governor of British Ceylon
- In office 11 May 1855 – 30 June 1860
- Monarch: Queen Victoria
- Preceded by: Charles Justin MacCarthy (Acting governor)
- Succeeded by: Henry Frederick Lockyer (Acting governor)

Personal details
- Born: 27 February 1797
- Died: 2 August 1860 (aged 63)
- Spouse(s): Emily Elizabeth Swinburne Ward, m. 8 April 1825
- Children: 10 living children, including Dudley Ward (judge)

Sir Henry George Ward GCMG (27 February 1797 – 2 August 1860) was an English diplomat, politician, and colonial administrator.

== Early life ==
He was the son of Robert Ward (who in 1828 changed his surname by sign manual to Plumer Ward) and his first wife Catherine Julia Maling, daughter of Christopher Thompson Maling of West Herrington, County Durham; and the cousin of William Ward and William George Ward. He was born in London on 27 February 1797. Educated at Harrow School, and sent abroad to learn languages, he became in 1816 attaché to the British legation at Stockholm, under Sir Edward Thornton. He was transferred to The Hague in 1818, and to Madrid in 1819. He was appointed joint commissioner to Mexico in October 1823, and returned to England in 1824 and he married Emily Elizabeth Swinburne in London on 8 April. Emily was the daughter of Emma Bennett and Sir John Swinburne, 6th Baronet. The Wards went together to Mexico in 1825, as chargé d'affaires, and two daughters were born there: Francess Guadalupe Filpe Maria Ward Butler (1825–1913) and Georgina Katherine Petronilla Ward (1826–1902). During this time, Emily Ward kept a notebook with sketches of their journey in Mexico, publishing them as illustrations in her husband's future book and also travel writings under her own name. Their son, Charles Dudley Robert Ward, was born at sea when they returned to England in 1827. Three more children were born soon thereafter: Jane Hamilton Julia Ward (1829–1901), Swinburne Ward (1830–1885), and Emily Rohesia Ward Lowry (1831–1916). Emily and Henry ended up with a total of ten children born between 1825 and 1839.

During a period of unrest in 1831 he raised the Gilston Troop of Hertfordshire Yeomanry Cavalry at Gilston Park. He used his political connections to prevent the troop from being either incorporated into the South Hertfordshire Yeomanry Cavalry or disbanded, and it survived as an independent unit until its disbandment in 1842.

== Politics in Parliament ==
In December 1832 Ward entered the House of Commons, elected as Member of Parliament (MP) for St Albans, and sitting for that seat until 1837; and then for Sheffield from 1837 to 1849. His reputation was as an advanced liberal, and he regarded classical economics as authoritative, as witnessed by his opposition to the Ten Hours Bill.

Ward's career in Parliament was marked by his hostility to the Church of Ireland, on which he moved a yearly resolution. The first occasion for this motion, that "the protestant episcopal establishment in Ireland exceeds the spiritual wants of the protestant population", was 27 May 1834, and it was particularly significant in British politics: it was brought at a time when the cabinet of Earl Grey was deeply divided on Irish issues. The timing owed to the prompting of Lord Durham, who wished to see an administration of a more Radical complexion. On the same day Lord Ripon, Edward Stanley, Sir James Graham, and the Duke of Richmond resigned office because they could not support the appointment of an Irish church commission. Ward had given notice of the motion, but behind the scenes, the Cabinet could not agree on a common approach, and a number of them had audiences with the King. A group around Edward Ellice saw this as the occasion for Stanley and Graham to quit the administration. The outcome was only resolved late in the evening when Stanley and Graham were already gone, and the Marquess of Lansdowne threatened to resign himself unless Viscount Althorp did as he was told by Grey, moving an adjournment of the motion in the Commons, while proposing an enquiry into the Irish church. On 2 June Ward's motion was voted down by 396 to 120.

Ward was strongly opposed to Chartism, which he saw starkly in terms of class conflict; but also took up the cause of the secret ballot, one Chartist demand. George Grote had introduced a motion on it in 1833, and up to 1839 there had been increasing support, with Thomas Babington Macaulay arguing on its side. Ward continued the series of motions in 1842, when Grote no longer was an MP.

Ward was First Secretary of the Admiralty from 1846 to 1849. He spoke in Parliament in defence of William Symonds, attacked in 1848 by the Radical MPs John MacGregor and Joseph Hume on grounds of profligate expenditure, putting the case that dockyard spending had seen retrenchment.

== Journalism, colonies and railways ==
Ward bought from Charles Buller and Henry Cole the loss-making Weekly Chronicle, and used it to campaign for his views.

Ward supported the colonisation aims and methods of Edward Gibbon Wakefield; and was a committee member of the South Australian Association set up in 1834 by Wakefield, with Buller and Grote, and also William Clay, Rowland Hill, William Molesworth, Southwood Smith, Henry Warburton and William Wolryche-Whitmore. Ward chaired the 1836 select committee on Disposal of Lands in the British Colonies. The other members of the committee were Francis Baring, Henry Lytton Bulwer, William Ewart Gladstone, George Grey, William Hutt, John Arthur Roebuck, and George Poulett Scrope. Eleven witnesses were called, but the colonists were not well represented among them, and Wakefield was given a platform for his views. The committee's report was in effect an endorsement of the "Wakefield system" and its recent implementation.

Ward was also on the committee of the New Zealand Association set up in 1837, with a number of the same people; and brought resolutions to Parliament on colonisation in June 1839. The initiative then floundered in the face of opposition from Lord John Russell and Robert Vernon Smith in the Commons, and from Tories, with widespread indifference. Ward and Hutt supported William Smith O'Brien on colonisation in Wakefield's style in June 1840, but the House was not convinced of the practicality of further schemes and disliked the expense.

In the days of early speculation, Ward was very involved with railway enterprises. He spoke in Parliament about the detrimental effect of the seekers of stag profit who invested, often fraudulently, in public offerings of railway shares; he put a figure of only 40% on the allocation to "genuine" investors. After a period in which he had put his own finances on a sounder basis, he lost heavily in the Railway Mania of 1846. Those close to the family believed he had dissipated the large fortune that had come from his Plumer stepmother.

== Colonial administrator ==
In May 1849 Ward was appointed Lord High Commissioner to the Ionian Islands, a post he held until 1855. The islands were then under the protection of the British Crown. He arrived at Corfu on 2 June 1849, found the local assembly unworkable and prorogued it. On 1 August 1849, he proclaimed an amnesty to those who had taken part in the rebellion in Cephalonia against his predecessor, Lord Seaton. By the end of August, there was a fresh insurgency; he went to Cephalonia, and suppressed it by October, using a large number of hangings and floggings. His actions were criticised in the House of Commons. The rest of his time was more peaceful, but Ward used his prerogative powers to freely banish newspaper editors of papers and members of the assembly. He left on 13 April 1855.

Ward on 11 May 1855 became governor of Ceylon. His first speech, that year, dealt with railways; he developed also economic policy on communications and telegraphy, and immigrant labour. He also consolidated the public administration. On the outbreak of the Indian rebellion of 1857 he despatched all the European troops in the colony to Bengal.

== Death ==
He succeeded Sir Charles Trevelyan as Governor of Madras in June 1860 but served in that capacity only for a few weeks until his death from cholera on 2 August, aged 63. He is buried in St. Mary's Church, Madras.

Ward was made a G.C.M.G. in 1849. A statue was erected to him at Kandy.

== Works ==
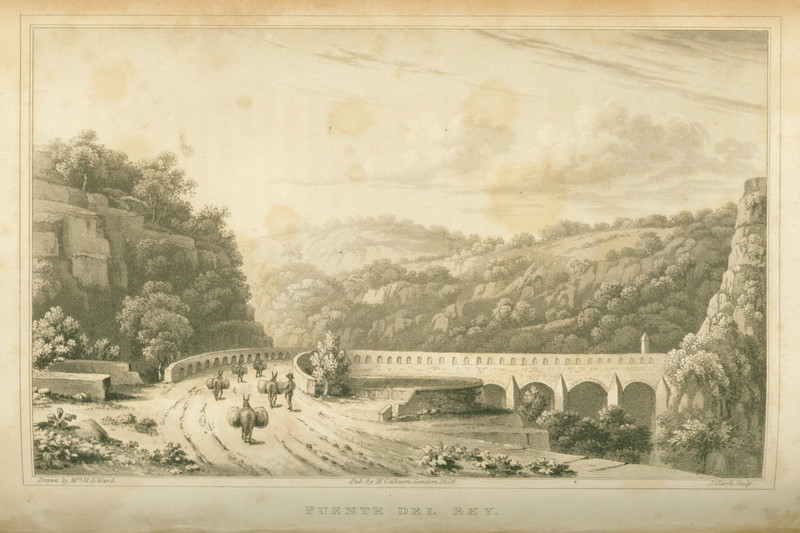
Puente del Rey, engraving from Mexico in 1827 (1828) by Henry George Ward, after Emily Elizabeth Ward.

Ward published two books about Mexico, illustrated by his wife. In Mexico in 1827 (1828) he tried to present a balanced view of the prospects for the country, formally independent from Spain in 1821. He gave an analysis of Mexico's mines, and was rather negative about the competence of William Bullock who had a mining concession from the Mexican government. He was also critical of attempts to finance pearl diving.

In The First Step to a Poor Law for Ireland (1837), Ward argued that large-scale emigration, sponsored by the state, was a precondition for the introduction of the workhouse system in Ireland.

A volume of his Speeches and Minutes in Ceylon appeared at Colombo in 1864.

== Family ==
Ward married, in 1824, Emily Elizabeth, daughter of Sir John Swinburne, 6th Baronet, of Capheaton Hall. Their eldest son, Dudley Ward, became a judge in New Zealand, and the second son, Swinburne Ward was a diplomat and amateur naturalist.

== Notes ==
Parliament of the United Kingdom
Preceded by Richard Godson; Sir Francis Vincent	Member of Parliament for St Albans; 1832 – 1837; With: Sir Francis Vincent to 1835; Edward Grimston from 1835	Succeeded by George Muskett; Edward Grimston
Preceded by John Parker; James Silk Buckingham	Member of Parliament for Sheffield; 1837–1849; With: John Parker	Succeeded by John Parker; John Arthur Roebuck
Government offices
Preceded by Charles Justin MacCarthy acting governor	Governor of Ceylon; 1855–1860	Succeeded by Henry Frederick Lockyer acting governor
