= Edward Grimston (St Albans MP) =

English amateur cricketer and a Conservative politician

The Right Honourable Edward Grimston
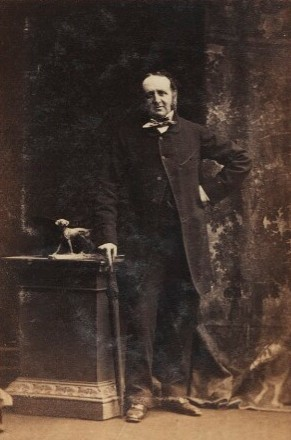
- Photograph of Grimston, 1861

Member of Parliament for St Albans
- In office 1835–1841 Serving with Henry George Ward, George Alfred Muskett
- Preceded by: Sir Francis Vincent; Henry George Ward
- Succeeded by: The Earl of Listowel; George Alfred Muskett

Personal details
- Born: Edward Harbottle Grimston; 2 April 1812 Mayfair, London
- Died: 4 May 1881 (aged 69) Pebmarsh, Essex
- Party: Conservative
- Spouse: Frances Horatia Morier (m. 1842; died 1881)
- Relations: James Grimston, 2nd Earl of Verulam (brother); Robert Grimstom (brother); Francis Grimston (brother); Edward Villiers, 5th Earl of Clarendon (nephew)
- Children: Walter Grimston
- Parent(s): James Grimston, 1st Earl of Verulam; Lady Charlotte Jenkinson

The Honourable Edward Harbottle Grimston (2 April 1812 – 4 May 1881) was an English amateur cricketer and a Conservative Party politician who held a seat in the House of Commons from 1835 to 1841.

== Early life ==
Grimston was born on 2 April 1812 at Mayfair, London. He was the second son of James Grimston, 1st Earl of Verulam and Lady Charlotte Jenkinson (a daughter of Charles Jenkinson, 1st Earl of Liverpool). Three of his brothers James, Robert and Francis all played, as did his son Walter and his nephew Lord Hyde.

Grimston played in 30 matches between 1832 and 1849, mainly for Oxford University and MCC. He was a right-handed batsman and an underarm medium pace bowler.

== Career ==
Grimston was elected at the 1835 general election as one of the two Members of Parliament (MPs) for the borough of St Albans in Hertfordshire. He was re-elected in 1837, but resigned his seat in 1841 by the procedural device of appointment as Steward of the Chiltern Hundreds.

=== Religious career ===
After resigning his parliamentary seat, Grimston took holy orders and was rector of Pebmarsh (a parish of which his father was patron) from 1841 until his death in 1881.

== Personal life ==
On 15 June 1842, Grimston was married to Frances Horatia Morier (1815–1906), a daughter of diplomat John Philip Morier and Horatia Maria Frances Seymour (eldest daughter of Lord Hugh Seymour, the youngest son of the 1st Marquess of Hertford). Among her six sisters was Katherine Georgina Morier, who married his brother (the Rev. Hon. Francis Sylvester Grimston), and Horatia Isabella Harriet Morier, who married Algernon St Maur, 14th Duke of Somerset. Together, they were the parents of:

- Charlotte Mary Grimston (d. 1932), who married Cecil Frederick Reid of Reid & Co., son of William Reid and Louisa Margaret Barkly, in 1869.
- Eleanor Grimston (d. 1933), who married Capt. William John Wauchope of Niddrie Marischal, Midlothian, in the 6th Inniskilling Dragoons, in 1870. After his death in 1882, she married Lt.-Col. Henry C. S. Goldfrap of Farnborough, Hampshire in the Lincolnshire Regiment in 1887.
- Walter Edward Grimston (1844–1932), who married Emily Pryor, daughter of Arthur D. Pryor and Elizabeth Sophia Dew, in 1872. After her death in 1884, he married Ellen Jane Woodhouse, daughter of Robert Woodhouse, in 1885.

Grimston died on 4 May 1881 at Pebmarsh, Essex.

Parliament of the United Kingdom
Preceded by Sir Francis Vincent; Henry George Ward	Member of Parliament for St Albans; 1835 – 1841; With: Henry George Ward to 1837; George Alfred Muskett from 1837	Succeeded by The Earl of Listowel; George Alfred Muskett
