= Moriera =

Scientific classification
- Kingdom: Plantae
- Clade: Tracheophytes
- Clade: Angiosperms
- Clade: Eudicots
- Clade: Rosids
- Order: Brassicales
- Family: Brassicaceae
- Genus: Moriera; Boiss
- Species: M. spinosa

Binomial name
- Moriera spinosa Boiss.

Synonyms
- Aethionema spinosum (Boiss.) Prantl; Lepidium intricatum Boiss. & Buhse; Moriera cabulica Boiss.; Moriera gracilis Czerniak.; Moriera stenoptera Bornm.

Species of flowering plant

Moriera is a monotypic genus of flowering plants belonging to the family Brassicaceae. It only contains one known species, Moriera spinosa Boiss.

Its native range is Central Asia and it is found in the countries of Afghanistan, Iran and Turkmenistan.

The genus name of Moriera is in honour of James Justinian Morier (c. 1780 – 1849), a British diplomat and author noted for his novels about the Qajar dynasty in Iran, most famously for the Hajji Baba series. The Latin specific epithet of spinosa is derived from spina meaning spiny. The genus was first described and published in Ann. Sci. Nat., Bot., série 2 Vol.16 on page 380 in 1841, and then the species, Moriera spinosa was first described and published in Ann. Sci. Nat., Bot., sér.2, vol.17 on page 182 in 1842.
