= The Adventures of Hajji Baba of Ispahan in England =

1828 novel

- 1835 edition
- Author: James Justinian Morier
- Language: English
- Genre: Adventure
- Publisher: Collins
- Publication date: 1828
- Publication place: United Kingdom
- Media type: Print

The Adventures of Hajji Baba of Ispahan in England is an 1828 novel by the British traveller and writer James Justinian Morier. It is a sequel to his 1824 novel The Adventures of Hajji Baba of Ispahan. It followed despite protests from the Persian ambassador to London about the original. Morier presented it as a satire on Western civilisation.

Along with the original novel it provided part of the inspiration for the 1954 American film The Adventures of Hajji Baba directed by Don Weis and starring John Derek, Elaine Stewart and Amanda Blake.

== Bibliography ==
- Luedtke, Luther S. Nathaniel Hawthorne and the Romance of the Orient. Indiana University Press, 1989.
- Ousby, Ian. The Cambridge Paperback Guide to Literature in English. Cambridge University Press, 1996.
