= Jacob Wilkinson (naturalist) =

Jacob Wilkinson (1773–1844) was an English naturalist working in the fields of geology and paleobiology.

== Life ==
Born in the City of London on 28 April 1773, he was the fifth surviving son of John Wilkinson (1732-1779), a wealthy businessman, and his wife Sibella Berdoe (1737-1807), daughter of his father's business partner John Berdoe. It is possible he was named after Jacob Wilkinson, a friend and maybe business associate of his father.

Living all his adult life outside Bath, Somerset, he became a keen collector of fossil remains of extinct creatures found in the area. In 1801 he acquired a huge mammoth tusk 2.4 metres (8 feet) long, together with other remains from the same site. These he presented to the Geological Society of London, who in 1807 made him one of their first honorary members. In 1805, he found the skeleton of an ichthyosaur at Weston, Bath. By 1811 he was reported to have perhaps the finest private collection of fossil bones in England, which he was glad to show to visitors.

As well as his scientific pursuits, when Britain was threatened by French invasion in 1803 he joined the Bath Forum Volunteer Infantry, in which he was commissioned as a Captain. In 1840 he gave land for founding a school, which was still flourishing in 2016 as St Stephen's Primary School.

He died in Bath at the age of 70 on 11 April 1844, with his will being proved in London on 27 June 1844.

== Family ==
At the age of 21 he married Olivia Maria Cranke Stephen (1771-1815), the ceremony being in Bath on 28 March 1795, and they had six children, three of whom married:

- Mary Sibella Wilkinson (1799-1867) in 1835 married the Reverend Jeremiah Awdry;
- Charles Edmund Wilkinson (1801-1870) in 1837 married Mary Drought Armstrong; and
- Caroline Margaretta Wilkinson (1806-1874) in 1841 married the Reverend Edmund Ward Pears.

After the death of Olivia, in 1818 he married Louisa Savage (1781-1859).
