= Thomas Reed (British Army officer) =

British army officer (1796–1883)

General Sir Thomas Reed GCB

20th General Officer Commanding, Ceylon
- In office 13 September 1854 – 1856
- Preceded by: Philip Bainbrigge
- Succeeded by: Henry Frederick Lockyer

Personal details
- Born: 1796 Dublin
- Died: 24 July 1883 (aged 86–87) Romsey

Military service
- Allegiance: United Kingdom
- Branch/service: British Army
- Years of service: 1813–1883
- Rank: General
- Commands: General Officer Commanding, Ceylon; Commander-in-Chief, India
- Battles/wars: Napoleonic Wars; Battle of Waterloo; First Anglo-Sikh War; Battle of Ferozeshah (WIA); Indian Mutiny

General Sir Thomas Reed GCB (1796 – 24 July 1883) was a British Army officer and the 20th General Officer Commanding, Ceylon.

== Early life ==
He was born in Dublin, the son of Thomas Reed of Dublin, by Eliza, daughter of Colonel Sir F. J. Buchanan.

Reed entered the army as a cornet in the 12th Light Dragoons in 1813, was promoted lieutenant in 1815, and was with the regiment at the Battle of Waterloo. In 1834 he was made lieutenant-colonel of the 62nd Foot, a position he held for eighteen years. He was made brevet-colonel in 1841 and the following year aide-de-camp to the queen. Two years afterwards he was made a CB.

== First Anglo-Sikh War ==
During the First Anglo-Sikh War, Reed's regiment formed part of the force which held Ferozepore under Sir John Hunter Littler. At the Battle of Ferozeshah in 1845 Reed commanded a brigade (including his own regiment) of Littler's division and was ordered to attack the strongest part of the Sikh entrenchments where there was a large number of heavy guns served with grape and canister. The attack was unsuccessful, with heavy losses, and Reed himself was slightly wounded.

In 1852 Reed gave up the command of the 62nd and went on half-pay, employed as colonel on the staff at Birmingham. Promoted major-general in 1854, he went out the following year as General Officer Commanding the troops in Ceylon.

== Indian Rebellion of 1857 ==
In 1856, Reed was transferred to a division of the Madras Army, and soon afterwards to the command of the troops in the Punjab.

When the Indian Rebellion of 1857 broke out, Reed became provisional commander-in-chief on the death of General Anson from cholera, as the senior officer in the Bengal presidency, until Sir Patrick Grant arrived. In this period from 27 May to 17 June, Reed appointed Neville Bowles Chamberlain as adjutant-general, and John Nicholson to command the mobile column. He took over on 10 June, from Henry William Barnard, command of preparations for the relief of Delhi, by siege or assault. He fell ill, however, and passed operations back to Barnard. He rejected the advice of Richard Baird Smith that an immediate assault should be made, a view supported by the civil officer Hervey Greathed.

On the death of Barnard on 5 July, also from cholera, Reed assumed command of the field force. Finding the demands of that position too much for him, he gave up the responsibility on 17 July, handing over to Archdale Wilson. He saw no further service in the field.

== Later life ==
In 1858, Reed was made colonel of the 44th (East Essex) Regiment of Foot, transferring in 1881 to be Colonel of the 1st Battalion, Essex Regiment, which was formed when the 44th Regiment was amalgamated in that year with the 56th Foot. He was promoted Lieutenant-General in 1860 and General in 1868.

In 1877 Reed was placed on the retired list, having had been made K.C.B. in 1865 and G.C.B. in 1875. He died at Romsey, Hampshire on 24 July 1883.

== Family ==
In 1835 Reed married Elizabeth Jane, daughter of John Clayton of Enfield Old Park, Middlesex.

Military offices
Preceded by Philip Bainbrigge	General Officer Commanding, Ceylon; 1854–1856	Succeeded by Henry Frederick Lockyer
