= Edward Villiers, 5th Earl of Clarendon =

British Liberal Unionist politician

The Right Honourable The Earl of Clarendon GCB GCVO PC DL
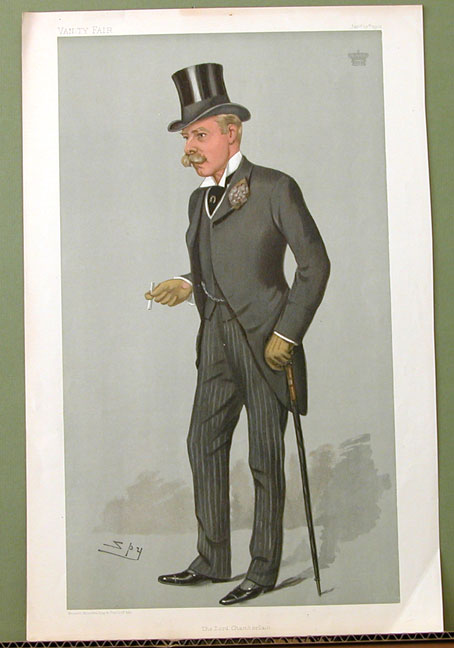
- "The Lord Chamberlain". Caricature by Spy published in Vanity Fair in 1901.

Lord Chamberlain of the Household
- In office 21 September 1900 – 4 December 1905
- Monarchs: Victoria; Edward VII
- Prime Minister: The Marquess of Salisbury; Arthur Balfour
- Preceded by: The Earl of Hopetoun
- Succeeded by: The Viscount Althorp

Personal details
- Born: 11 February 1846
- Died: 2 October 1914 (aged 68)
- Party: Liberal Unionist
- Spouse(s): Lady Caroline Agar (m. 1876; died 1894) Emma Hatch (m. 1908)
- Children: 2
- Parent(s): George Villiers, 4th Earl of Clarendon; Lady Katherine Grimston
- Education: Trinity College, Cambridge

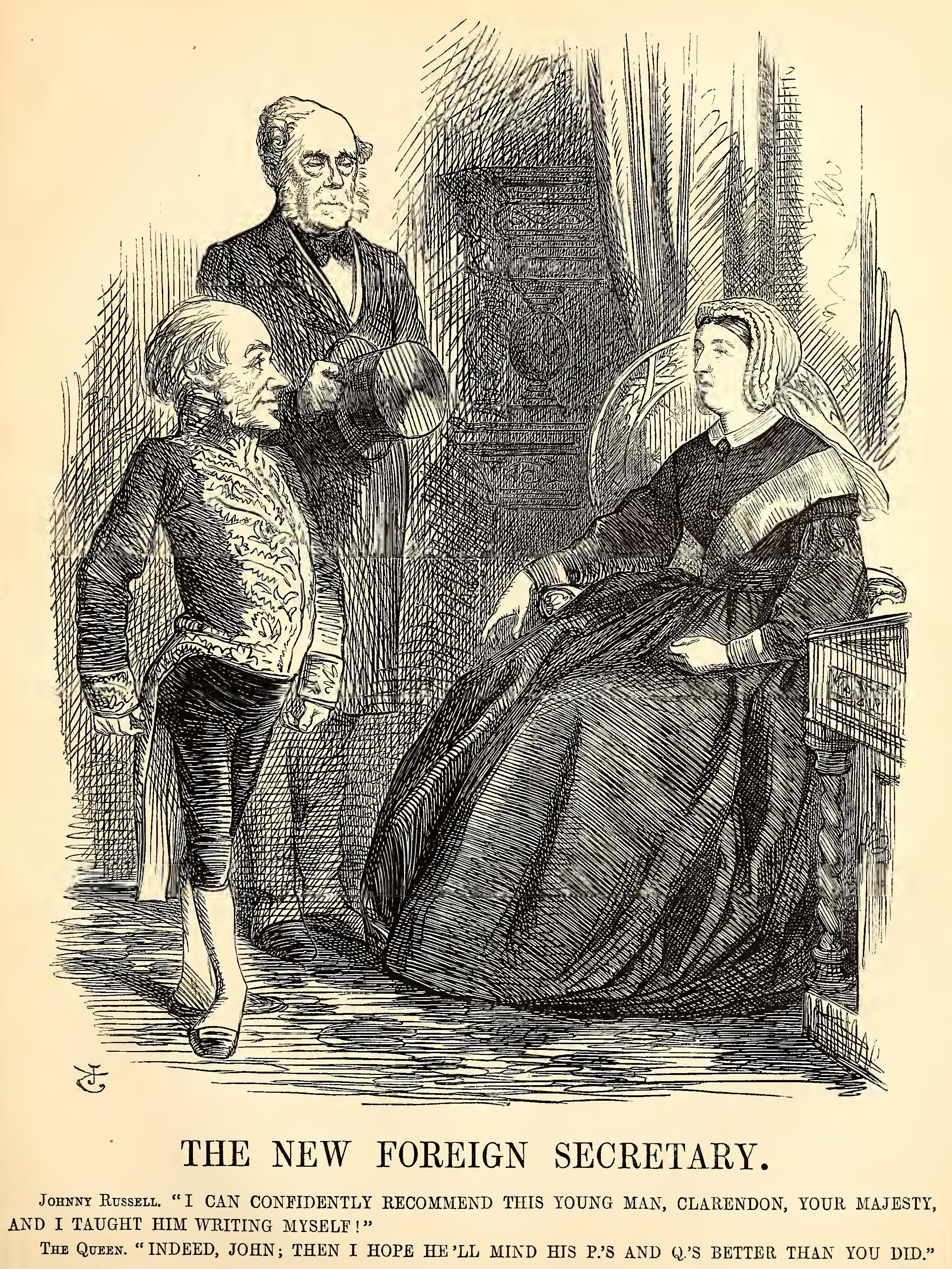
Edward Villiers, 5th Earl of Clarendon in 1865 Punch

Edward Hyde Villiers, 5th Earl of Clarendon, GCB, GCVO, TD, PC, DL (11 February 1846 – 2 October 1914), styled Lord Hyde between 1846 and 1870, was a British Liberal Unionist politician from the Villiers family. He served as Lord Chamberlain of the Household between 1900 and 1905.

== Background and education ==
Clarendon was the second (but eldest surviving) son of the prominent Liberal statesman George Villiers, 4th Earl of Clarendon, and his wife Lady Katherine Grimston, daughter of James Grimston, 1st Earl of Verulam. He was educated at Harrow and Trinity College, Cambridge.

== Political career ==
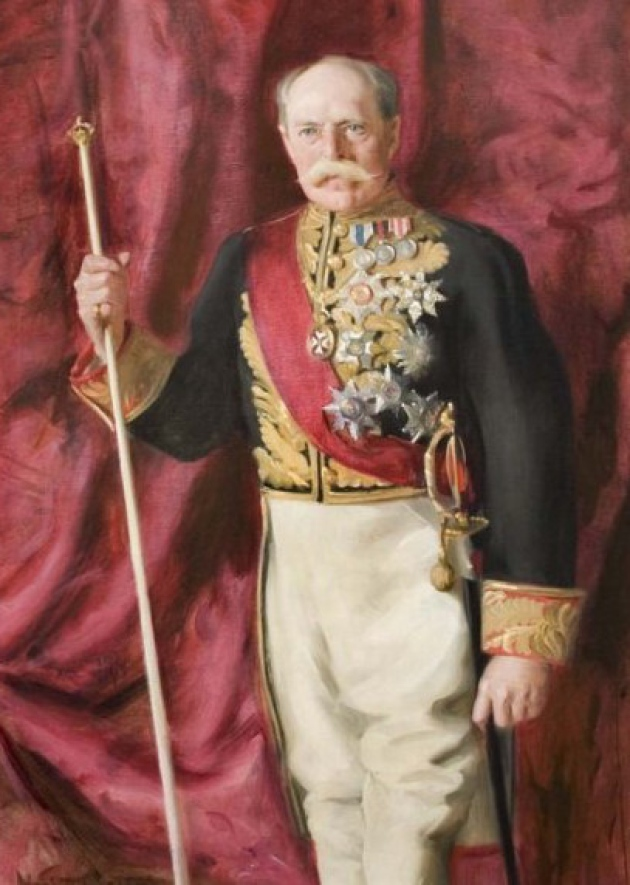
Portrait of Clarendon in his uniform as Lord Chamberlain, c. 1902

Clarendon was elected to Parliament for Brecon in 1869, a seat he retained until the following year, when he succeeded his father in the earldom and took his seat in the House of Lords. In 1895 he was appointed a Lord-in-waiting in the Unionist administration of Lord Salisbury, a position he held until 1900, when he was promoted to Lord Chamberlain of the Household and admitted to the Privy Council. He retained this office also when Arthur Balfour became Prime Minister in 1902. The government fell in December 1905 and Clarendon was never to return to office.

Apart from his political career, Lord Clarendon joined the Hertfordshire Yeomanry as a Troop Quartermaster in 1868, and was commissioned as a Cornet the following year. He was promoted captain in 1872 and to command the regiment in 1879 with the rank of lieutenant-colonel. He was the regiment's longest-serving commanding officer, continuing in the position until 1901, and was afterwards appointed Honorary Colonel of the regiment on 7 February 1903. He was also Lord-Lieutenant of Hertfordshire from 1893 to 1914.

== Sporting career ==
Clarendon made one known appearance for Cambridge University Cricket Club in 1865. He was a right-handed batsman and a roundarm fast bowler. (Four of his uncles – James, Edward, Robert and Francis Grimston – played, as did his cousin Walter Grimston.) Between 1890 and 1896, Clarendon was a member of the Football Committee at West Hertfordshire Sports Club, chairing some of the meetings. During this period the club won three Herts Senior Cups in four years, not entering it in the other year. This football section was later to become known as Watford Football Club.

== Family ==
Lord Clarendon married firstly, Lady Caroline Agar, daughter of James Agar, 3rd Earl of Normanton, on 6 September 1876. After his first wife's death in 1894 he married secondly, Emma Hatch, on 5 August 1908. By his first marriage he had two children:

- George Herbert Hyde Villiers, 6th Earl of Clarendon (1877–1955)
- Lady Edith Villiers (1878–1935), married Piers Edgcumbe, 5th Earl of Mount Edgcumbe

Lord Clarendon died in October 1914, aged 68, and was succeeded in the earldom by his only son George.

He owned 2,300 acres in Hertfordshire.

== Artistic recognition ==
He was sculpted by Mary Pownall in about 1900.

== Honours ==
British honours

- GCB: Knight Grand Cross of the Order of the Bath – 24 October 1902 – announced in the 1902 Coronation Honours list on 26 June 1902, invested by King Edward VII at Buckingham Palace on 24 October 1902.
- GCVO: Knight Grand Cross of the Royal Victorian Order in 1905
- TD: Territorial Decoration

Foreign honours

- Kingdom of Prussia: Knight 1st class of the Order of the Red Eagle – 1899 – in connection with the visit of Emperor Wilhelm II to the United Kingdom.

Parliament of the United Kingdom
Preceded by Howel Gwyn	Member of Parliament for Brecon; 1869–1870	Succeeded by James Gwynne-Holford
Political offices
Preceded by The Lord Acton	Lord-in-waiting; 1895–1900	Succeeded by The Earl Howe
Court offices
Preceded by The Earl of Hopetoun	Lord Chamberlain of the Household; 1900–1905	Succeeded by Viscount Althorp
Honorary titles
Preceded by The Earl of Verulam	Lord-Lieutenant of Hertfordshire; 1892–1914	Succeeded by The Viscount Hampden
Peerage of Great Britain
Preceded by George Villiers	Earl of Clarendon; 1870–1914	Succeeded by George Villiers
