= Weekly Chronicle =

Historic London newspaper

The Weekly Chronicle was a London newspaper, in existence from 18 September 1836 to 21 December 1867. It went under the title Weekly News and Chronicle from June 1851 to December 1854. Reverting then to the original title, it was the Weekly Chronicle and Register from December 1855.

The MP Henry George Ward bought the paper in 1837 from its founders Charles Buller and Henry Cole, and used it to campaign for his views. It was loss-making at the original cover price of 3d.; Ward raised that to 4d. and then 6d.

During the Chartist movement of 1838–39, Ward used the Weekly Chronicle to take the line in February 1839 that the agitation was failing, and its supporters would do better to rally behind Lord Durham.
