= Robert Grimston (cricketer) =

English cricketer

The Honourable Robert Grimston (born 18 September 1816 at Mayfair, London; died 7 April 1884 at Gorhambury House, Hertfordshire) was an English amateur cricketer and a pioneer of electric telegraphy.

== Career ==
Grimston was educated at Harrow School and Christ Church, Oxford. Ruskin, who was a fellow-undergraduate and Christ Church, described him as "a man of gentle birth and amiable manners, and of herculean strength, whose love of dogs and horses, and especially of boxing, was stupendous." He played for Oxford University, Marylebone Cricket Club (MCC) and several other teams, making 63 known appearances from 1836 to 1855. He was a right-handed batsman. He was one of the first members of I Zingari, and held the post of honorary treasurer. He was also a member of the MCC, and for some time president; he frequently played in matches at Lord's, and preserved his interest in the game till his death. In 1846 he assisted in the formation of a Surrey county eleven, which began playing in Kennington Oval, then a market garden.

After Grimston's death, the MCC's annual report said of him: "His name has been for so many years connected with our national game, as well as with every other manly British sport, that his death must be deeply regretted by all past and present cricketers, but by none so deeply as the members of this club, with which he had been so long associated, and in which he was so justly esteemed as a true friend, a thorough sportsman, and the type of an honourable English gentleman."

After graduating at Oxford, Grimston studied law and was called to the bar at Lincoln's Inn in 1843, but he was not adapted for the law, and practically gave up the profession in 1852, and devoted himself to the then novel enterprise of electric telegraphy, joining the board of the Electric Telegraph Company. Later he was a director of the Atlantic Telegraph Company and chairman of the Indo-European Telegraph Company.

== Family ==
Grimston was the fourth son of James Grimston, 1st Earl of Verulam. Three of his brothers James, Edward and Francis all played, as did his nephews Walter Grimston and Lord Hyde. He was also a supporter of the boxing arts and in the early 1850s, he and his brother James frequented middleweight champion Nat Langham's Rum Pum-Pas club, a dining and boxing establishment in Westminster popular with the aristocracy.

== Grimston's Oak ==
An impressive oak tree (Quercus robur) at the junction of several rides in Epping Forest, Essex is named Grimston's Oak after Robert Grimston. The tree had a girth of 4.95 metres in 2007 and its estimated age is 350 years. It stands between Fairmead Bottom and Connaught Water at grid reference TQ 4042095658.

== External sources ==
- Arthur Haygarth, Scores & Biographies, Volumes 2–5 (1827–1857), Lillywhite, 1862
