= Isaac Morier =

British consul-general (1750–1817)

Isaac Morier (1750–1817) was British consul-general of the Levant Company at Constantinople.

== Early life ==
Isaac Morier was born on 12 August 1750 in Smyrna. He was from a Huguenot family. He was educated at Harrow.

== Career ==
In 1803, he lost his fortune in 1803 and had to work. In 1804, he was appointed the first consul-general of the Levant Company at Constantinople, and on the dissolution of the company in 1806, he became his Britannic majesty's consul. He also became an agent of the East India Company, and held both positions until his death in 1817 from the plague in Constantinople.

== Personal life ==
Morier became a naturalised Englishman. In 1775, he married Clara van Lennep, daughter of the Dutch consul-general and president of the Dutch Levant Company. They had children including:

- John Philip Morier (1776–1853), diplomat
- James Justinian Morier (1780–1849), diplomat and novelist
- David Richard Morier (1784–1877), diplomat
- William Morier (1790–1864), admiral

== Death ==
Morier died in 1817.
