= Walter Grimston =

English cricketer

Walter Edward Grimston (16 May 1844 – 28 July 1932) was an English amateur cricketer.

He mainly played amateur matches for I Zingari but did make a single appearance for Southgate against Cambridge University in 1868. He played for I Zingari from 1864 to 1879.

He was a right-handed batsman and an occasional wicketkeeper.

His father Edward played, as did three of his uncles James, Robert and Francis Grimston and his cousin Lord Hyde.
