= The Adventures of Hajji Baba =

1954 film by Don Weis

- Directed by: Don Weis
- Screenplay by: Richard Collins
- Based on: The Adventures of Hajji Baba of Ispahan by James Justinian Morier
- Produced by: Walter Wanger
- Starring: John Derek; Elaine Stewart; Amanda Blake; Thomas Gomez; Rosemarie Bowe; Paul Picerni; Donald Randolph
- Cinematography: Harold Lipstein
- Edited by: William Austin
- Music by: Dimitri Tiomkin
- Color process: Color by DeLuxe
- Production companies: Walter Wanger Productions; Allied Artists Picture Corporation
- Distributed by: 20th Century Fox
- Release date: October 1, 1954
- Running time: 93 minutes
- Country: United States
- Language: English
- Budget: $816,813
- Box office: $2,019,100

The Adventures of Hajji Baba is a 1954 American CinemaScope adventure film directed by Don Weis and starring John Derek and Elaine Stewart. Made in Southern California, it was released on October 1, 1954. In the credits it states that the film is suggested by The Adventures of Hajji Baba of Ispahan by James Justinian Morier (3 vols., London, 1824).

== Plot ==
In Ispahan, Persia, a barber named Hajji Baba is leaving his father's shop to find a great fortune. At the same time, the Princess Fawzia is trying to talk her father the Caliph into giving her in marriage to Nur-El-Din a prince known far and wide. The Caliph intends for Fawzia to marry a friend and ally, and makes plans to send her to him. But a courier brings word from Nur-El-Din that an escort awaits Fawzia on the outskirts of the city and she escapes the palace disguised as a boy. Hajji encounters the escort-warrior at the rendezvous spot, is attacked and beats up the escort with his barber's tools. The princess arrives and mistakes Hajji as the escort until he mistakes the emerald ring sent by Nur-El-Din to Fawzia as the prize to be delivered. In her efforts to escape him, her turban becomes unbound and Hajji realizes that the girl herself is the treasure Nur-El-Din awaits. Hajji promises to escort her and they spend the night with the caravan of Osman Aga, who invites them to stay for the dancing girls, among them, the incomparable Ayesha. The pair are overtaken by the Caliph's guards sent to bring Fawzia back, but the guards are driven off by an invading army of Turcoman women, a band of fierce and beautiful women who prey on passing merchants.

== Cast ==
- John Derek as Hajji Baba
- Elaine Stewart as Princess Fawzia
- Amanda Blake as Banah
- Rosemarie Bowe as Ayesha
- Thomas Gomez as Osman Aga
- Paul Picerni as Nurel-Din
- Donald Randolph as Caliph

== Production ==
The film is based on The Adventures of Hajji Baba of Ispahan by James Justinian Morier published in 1824. It was popular and remained in print for over a century.

In the early 1950s, Walter Wanger produced four films with Allied Artists. They were happy with the results and signed a new contract with the producer, the first of which was to be Hajji Baba. It was a return to the type of film Wanger had previously made such as Arabian Nights (1942).

Allied Artists had been shut down for three months but re-opened again with a slate of ten films starting with Hajji Baba. Elaine Stewart and Don Weis were borrowed from MGM. Filming started 12 April 1954. Linda Christian was meant to play Banah but dropped out and was replaced by Amanda Blake.

== Reception ==
The film was a hit and made a profit of $673,593.

FilmInk called it "hugely fun... perhaps the most successful of any film starring Derek... It has nice colour, a Nat King Cole theme song, plenty of action, torture and dancing girls."

== Soundtrack ==
- "Hajji Baba (Persian Lament)"
  - Sung by Nat "King" Cole
  - Music by Dimitri Tiomkin
  - Lyrics by Ned Washington
  - Arranged by Nelson Riddle
