= Henry Frederick Lockyer =

British Major-General (1797–1860)

Major-General Henry Frederick Lockyer CB KH
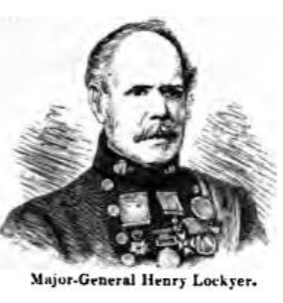

Acting Governor of British Ceylon
- In office 30 June 1860 – 30 July 1860
- Monarch: Queen Victoria
- Preceded by: Henry George Ward
- Succeeded by: Charles Edmund Wilkinson (Acting governor)

21st General Officer Commanding, Ceylon
- In office 1856–?
- Preceded by: T. Reed
- Succeeded by: Terence O'Brien

Personal details
- Born: 1797
- Died: 1860 (aged 62–63)
- Spouse: Ellis Ann Elizabeth Lockyer

Military service
- Allegiance: United Kingdom
- Branch/service: British Army
- Rank: Major-General
- Commands: General Officer Commanding, Ceylon

Major-General Henry Frederick Lockyer, CB, KH (1797–30 August 1860) was an acting Governor of British Ceylon.

He saw much service, including as commander of the 97th Regiment of Foot, being promoted from Colonel to Major-General of that regiment in 1858. He was appointed acting Governor of Ceylon on 30 June 1860 and was acting Governor until 30 July 1860. On his return journey home, he died aboard the SS Ripon. He was succeeded by Charles Edmund Wilkinson.

Government offices
Preceded by Henry George Ward	Acting; Governor of British Ceylon; 1860-1860	Succeeded by Charles Edmund Wilkinson acting governor
Military offices
Preceded by Thomas Reed	General Officer Commanding, Ceylon; 1856–?	Succeeded by Terence O'Brien
