= Battle of the Strait of Gibraltar (1590) =

- Part of the Anglo–Spanish War
Date	24 April 1590
Location	Off Straits of Gibraltar, Spain
Result	English victory

Belligerents
Spain	England: Levant Company

Commanders and leaders
(Spain) Pedro de Acuña	(England) Benedict Barnham

Strength
12 galleys	10 armed merchant vessels

Casualties and losses
Many galleys severely damaged, Heavy casualties	Light

The First Battle of the Strait of Gibraltar was a naval engagement that took place on 24 April 1590 during the Anglo-Spanish War. Ten English armed merchant vessels of the Levant Company were met and intercepted by twelve Spanish galleys under Pedro de Acuña in the service of Spain in the region of the Gibraltar Straits. English sources claim that the English were able to repel the galleys inflicting heavy losses after a six-hour fight, while Spanish sources show the battle as indecisive.

== Background ==
The Levant company had been trading in the Mediterranean since 1580 after a successful petition to Queen Elizabeth I. They had established "factories" in Aleppo and Constantinople, Alexandria and Smyrna. The war with Spain in 1585 had started and as a result the company armed their ships as part of an investment by the English crown and sailed in convoy for their mutual protection. This proved successful as in July 1586 off Pantelleria island, five ships of the company managed to repel eleven Spanish galleys. After this victory the company's military strategy remained from that day.

In mid April 1590 ten ships of the company, some freighted for Venice, for Constantinople and to other parts of the Mediterranean met on their homeward course within the Straits of Gibraltar having escaped all danger thus far. As soon as they were all together they came into a tight convoy formation as they approached the Spanish-held waters. Two Flemish ships on their way back from the Mediterranean also joined them in convoy, partly for protection against pirates. The lead ship Salomon whose captain Benedict Barnham was in charge followed by second in command John Watts of the Margeret and John, followed with the rest; Thomas Cordell's Centurion, Minion, Viloet, Samual, Elizabeth, Ascension and finally the Richard.

On 24 April as they approached the Straits of Gibraltar twelve tall galleys were seen and soon the ships under orders from Barnham were told to prepare hastily for action. English sources assert that the galleys were under the command of Andrea Doria's great-nephew Giovanni Andrea Doria., while Spanish official data show that the actual commander of the Spanish squadron was don Pedro de Acuña, although they acknowledge a previous unsuccessful attempt of Doria against an English convoy.

== Engagement ==
As the galleys approached, Salomon fired off a number of warning shots but without success. The galleys then formed out of line, becoming an arrowhead formation. As this was happening, Salomon soon targeted the lead ship and began to find its target. The lead galleys sheared away almost violently with the first suffering damage that ultimately forced it to withdraw. Soon the other English ships began to fire; Minion and Margaret and John shielded the lighter armed vessels. Centurion, the biggest ship, was held back in reserve.

Within the first hour of action, one of the Flemish ships which was nearby immediately sailed to the Spanish galleys and surrendered, which gave some distraction for a while. The other Flemish ship was boarded by sailors from the Violet and dissuaded from surrendering. The galleys however continued to attack the English ships in attempts to grapple and board; a usual Spanish tactic on the sea at the time. However, after nearly three hours, the Spanish were kept at bay and each galley that attempted to get close was repelled until the next one came along trying to get close enough to grapple.

Salomon soon began to run out of powder as did Margaret and John. Centurion soon came up along with Elizabeth which so far had fired off very little. Now with both ships in action, Centurion's fire soon began to tell and the Spanish galleys were not getting anywhere near enough to board. Eventually after nearly six hours of fighting, the last of the Spanish galleys had been repelled with some in a sinking state. Doria's galleys had all suffered much damage and losses in galley slaves, soldiers, and sailors had been heavy. With this in mind, he had no choice but to go into port and so withdrew immediately to Algeciras after temporarily shadowing the English ships.

Spanish views on the battle differ greatly from the English point of view. The Spanish naval historian and captain Cesáreo Fernández Duro points out that the Levant Company ships only sailed through the strait in rough seas, which prevented the Spanish galleys from boarding them, and also from using their main gun. Fernández Duro also notes that most of the English, and some French authors, had mistaken the Spanish galleys' failure to approach the English ships with a success of the company's vessels in repelling the galleys with cannon fire.

== Aftermath ==
The English ships, except in the rigging and masts, had sustained only little damage, since the Spanish aim was to board and overpower. None of this was achieved as the English fire or the rough sea, depending on sources, had been strong enough not to allow the Spanish galleys into grappling position. The English casualties were only light at best but soon the wind had died down and therefore were becalmed just before Gibraltar itself. They were in desperate need of shot and powder as most of the bigger ships were close to being out of ammunition by the end of the action.

The English therefore had no alternative but to tow their vessels into the nearest friendly harbor, that being Tétouan on the Barbary coast. Once there fresh supplies were bought in and the inhabitants treated them favorably. News soon trickled in of the repulse of the galleys and the governor extended gifts upon them and granted them stay for as long as they wanted. After around four days and with the wind now in their favor, the English sailed off without incident; the Spanish in the harbor of Algeciras unable to intercept them because of their severe damage or the rough sea. The English soon arrived off the coast of England without further hindrance.

In the following months the Levant Company ships clashed with varying results against Spanish galleys. On August Acuña sank one ship and took another, while in 1591 an English convoy would meet another fleet of Spanish galleys under Doria in the same area and with the same outcome.

== Bibliography ==
- Bicheno, Hugh (2012). Elizabeth's Sea Dogs: How England's Mariners Became the Scourge of the Seas. Conway. ISBN 978-1844861743.
- Clowes, William Laird (2003). The Royal Navy: A History – From the Earliest Times to 1900. Vol. 1. Chatham Publishing; New ed. ISBN 978-1861760104.
- Epstein, Mortimer (2010). The English Levant Company: Its Foundation and Its History to 1640. Biblio Bazaar. ISBN 978-1-147-25478-5.
- Kerr, Roger (2012). A General History of Voyages and Travels to the End of the 18th Century. Vol. 7. Ulan Press. ISBN 978-1143372438.
- Kingston, William H. G. (2010). How Britannia Came to Rule the Waves. Salzwasser-Verlag im Europäischen Hochschulverlag. ISBN 978-3861953968.
- Rodger, N. A. M. (2004). The Safeguard of the Sea: A Naval History of Britain: 660–1649. Vol. 1. London: Penguin. ISBN 978-0140297249.
