= Battle of the Strait of Gibraltar (1591) =

1591 battle

- Part of the Anglo–Spanish War
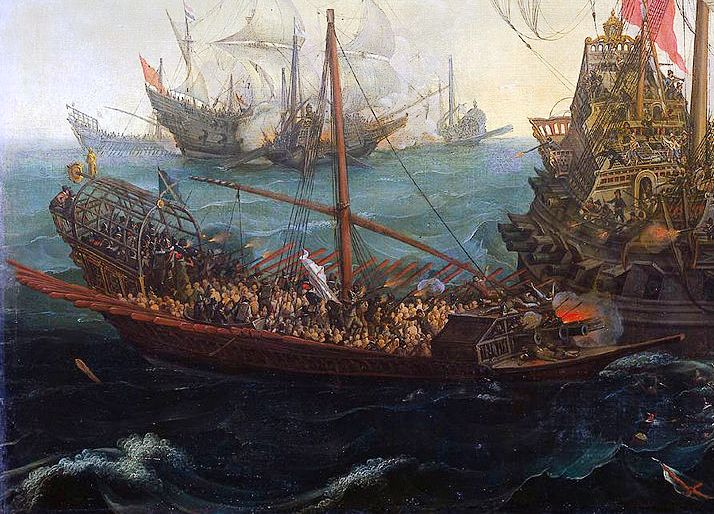
- A Spanish galley in action
| Date | April 24th 1591 |
| Location | Off Straits of Gibraltar, Spain |
| Result | English victory |

Belligerents
| Spain | England: Levant Company |

Commanders and leaders
| Pedro de Acuña | Robert Bradshaw † John Giles |

Strength
| 5 galleys | 4 armed merchant vessels |

Casualties and losses
| 5 galleys severely damaged 200 killed or drowned | 1 ship sunk 1 ship damaged Approximately 44 killed & 10 wounded |

The Battle of the Strait of Gibraltar was a naval action off Gibraltar on 24th of April, 1591. A fleet of three English merchant vessels escorted by a larger armed merchant vessel Centurion was attacked by five Spanish galleys. Ultimately, the Spanish were repelled, but not before the English vessel Dolphin was sunk by one of the galleys.

== Background ==
The English merchants, which included ships of the Levant Company, were sailing for various ports but had banded together to sail through the heavily Spanish-dominated Straits of Gibraltar. Among these ships was the Centurion, a large armed merchant vessel but weakly manned.

The Centurion arrived at Marseille, on her outward bound voyage after delivering her goods, she remained there for more than five weeks, taking in lading, and then intended to return to England. When she was ready to depart from Marseille, there were other smaller sundry ships. Their masters of which interested Robert Bradshaw of Limehouse, the master of the Centurion, to stay a day or two for them until they could get in readiness to depart. They agreed that it would be far better for them all to go in company for mutual support and defence, than to run the hazard of falling into the hands of the Spanish galleys in the Straits as they had done the year before. Bradshaw agreed and set out along with them all engaging mutually to stand by each other, if they chanced to fall in with any of the Spanish galleys.

The Spanish meanwhile had sent six galleys from Cartagena, part of a squadron of twelve owned by Giovanni Andrea Doria, to convey the Spanish ambassador to Rome. The fleet was captained by Pedro de Acuña, who in some sources is mistaken by Doria himself.

== Action ==
Sailing altogether along the coast of Spain, they were suddenly becalmed upon 24 April in the Straits of Gibraltar, where they immediately saw the six galleys making towards them. Centurion was prepared for any such engagement, having prepared their close quarters in readiness. However, there were only 48 men and boys fit for duty. As the Spanish galleys bore up, the Centurion discharged her ordnance. The other merchant vessels initially lay out of danger, while five of the galleys laid on board the Centurion, which they made themselves fast with their grappling irons, two to a side with a fifth galley on the stern. On both sides of the ship the Spanish were repelled; the ropes and grapples were cut successively and fire was maintained to cripple the Spanish ships. The Centurion was set ablaze several times, but was extinguished each time with little damage.

In every one of these five galleys there were about 200 soldiers; who battered the Centurion and shot her mainmast through. In the end, however, the Spaniards had almost spent their ammunition, so that they were obliged to load with hammers and the chains of their galley-slaves. At length, the Spaniards were constrained to unfasten their grapplings and shear off as they had suffered heavy casualties and many of their ships were severely damaged. Meanwhile, the smaller and less armed Dolphin was engaged by one of the galleys and eventually blew up, either by enemy gunfire or scuttled by their own crew. There were no survivors, including Dolphin´s captain, John Giles.

== Aftermath ==
The action had lasted for five and a half hours. By the end, both English and Spanish were glad to draw off, and the Spaniards did not renew the fight. The Spanish had suffered many casualties, around 200 men, many of whom drowned. The Centurion had four men killed and another ten men injured severely. The next day six other Spanish galleys came and kept watch on the Centurion but did not attempt any kind of action. The rest of the convoy managed to arrive in London without further incident, although the sinking of the Dolphin resulted in the loss of £2,000. The Centurion would play a part in the Capture of Cádiz in 1596 and then take part in the capture of San Juan in 1598.
