= David Richard Morier =

English diplomat and author

David Richard Morier (1784–1877) was an English diplomat and author.

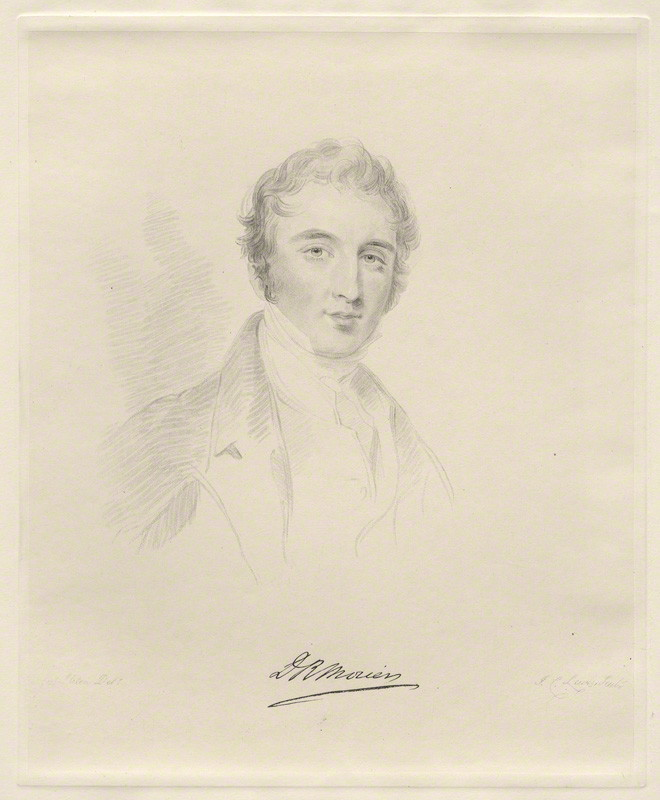
David Richard Morier, stipple engraving

== Life ==
The third son of Isaac Morier, Consul-General to the Turkey Company at Constantinople, he was born in Smyrna on 8 January 1784 and educated at Harrow School before entering the diplomatic service. In January 1804, at the age of 20, he was appointed secretary to a political mission sent by the British government to Ali Pasha and the Turkish governors of the Morea and other provinces, with a view to counteracting the influence of France in south-east Europe. In May 1807 he was ordered to take entire charge of the mission, but the continuing rupture of diplomatic relations between England and the Ottoman Empire defeated his negotiations.

Morier was shortly transferred to Sir Arthur Paget's mission, at the Dardanelles. He was despatched on special service to Egypt, where he was instructed to negotiate for the release of the British prisoners captured by Muhammad Ali during the Alexandria expedition of 1807. In the summer of 1808 he was attached to Robert Adair's embassy, and with Stratford Canning, assisted in negotiations which resulted in the Treaty of the Dardanelles of 5 January 1809. Back in Constantinople, with the exception of a mission to Tabriz from October 1809 to the following summer, he remained at the embassy, first under Adair, and then (1810–12) as secretary of legation under his successor, Stratford Canning.

At the end of Canning's appointment, Morier accompanied him (July 1812) on his return to England. In 1813 he was attached to Lord Aberdeen's mission to Vienna, and during the years 1813–1815 was employed in the negotiations around the fall of Napoleon. He was with Lord Castlereagh at the conferences at Chatillon-sur-Seine, and assisted in the preparation of the Treaty of Paris (1814). In the same year he attended the foreign minister at the Congress of Vienna, and, when the Duke of Wellington succeeded Castlereagh, Morier remained as one of the secretaries. In July 1815, after the final overthrow of Napoleon, Morier accompanied Castlereagh to Paris, and was occupied till September in drafting the Treaty of Paris (1815).

Appointed consul-general for France in November 1814, Morier did not take up the post until September 1815, when his work on the treaties was completed. At the same time he was named a commissioner for the settlement of the claims of British subjects on the French government. The consul-generalship was abolished, and Morier retired on a pension 5 April 1832, but was almost immediately (5 June) appointed minister plenipotentiary to the Swiss Confederated States. He then resided in Bern for 15 years.

On 19 June 1847, at the age of 63, Morier retired from the diplomatic service. He died in London 13 July 1877 at the age of 93.

== Works ==
Morier published two pamphlets, What has Religion to do with Politics? (London, 1848), and The Basis of Morality (London, 1869). At the age of 73 he published a novel, Photo, the Suliote, a Tale of Modern Greece, London, 1857. Material for the story came from a Greek physician with whom Morier was spent a period of quarantine at Corfu.

Some letters written by Morier at Tabriz were published in Stanley Lane-Poole's Life of Stratford Canning.

== Family ==
Morier married Anna Jones, daughter of Robert Burnett Jones. His only son was Sir Robert Burnett David Morier. His daughter Mary married Sheffield Neave. His daughters Elisabeth, born 19.05.1821 and Caecilla, born 07.05.1824 died in Bern, Switzerland.

== Notes ==
Attribution

This article incorporates text from a publication now in the public domain: Lee, Sidney, ed. (1894). "Morier, David Richard". Dictionary of National Biography. Vol. 39. London: Smith, Elder & Co.
