= John Bouverie =

British antiquarian and art collector

John Bouverie (c. 1723 – 19 September 1750) was a British antiquarian and art collector. He was the originator of a collection of drawings now known as the "Bouverie collection", which passed to his spinster sister Elizabeth and from her to Sir Charles Middleton, then to Middleton's son-in-law Sir Gerald Noel, father of the 1st Earl of Gainsborough. Bouverie died at Guzel Hissar on 19 September 1750 whilst travelling in the Ottoman Empire and observing ancient remains there with Robert Wood and James Dawkins.
