= Francis Grimston =

English cricketer, clergyman, and vicar

The Rev. Hon. Francis Sylvester Grimston (8 December 1822 – 28 October 1865) was an English clergyman and amateur cricketer.

== Early life and education ==
Francis Grimston was born in 1822 at Gorhambury, Hertfordshire, the sixth and youngest son of James Grimston, 1st Earl of Verulam. Three of his brothers James, Edward and Robert all played, as did his nephews Walter Grimston and Lord Hyde.

He was educated at Harrow and Magdalene College, Cambridge. At Cambridge, he was a member of the University Pitt Club.

== Career ==
As a cricketer, Grimston was mainly associated with Cambridge University and Marylebone Cricket Club (MCC), making 18 known appearances from 1843 to 1851. He was a wicket-keeper.

He later became a clergyman, and was vicar of Wakes Colne from 1846 to 1865. He died at Wakes-Colne, Essex.

== External sources ==
- CricketArchive record
