= Charles Edmund Wilkinson =

British military officer (1801–1870)

Acting Governor of British Ceylon
- In office 30 July 1860 – 22 October 1860
- Monarch: Queen Victoria
- Preceded by: Henry Frederick Lockyer (Acting governor)
- Succeeded by: Charles Justin MacCarthy

Personal details
- Born: 1801
- Died: 3 June 1870 (aged 68–69) Knightsbridge, London
- Spouse: Mary Drought Armstrong

Military service
- Allegiance: United Kingdom
- Branch/service: British Army
- Rank: Major-General
- Unit: Royal Engineers

Charles Edmund Wilkinson (1801 – 3 June 1870) was a British army officer who rose to the rank of Major-General and served as acting Governor of British Ceylon.

== Life ==
Born 1801, he was the only son of the naturalist Jacob Wilkinson (1773–1844) and his first wife Olivia Maria Cranke Stephen (1771–1815).

Pursuing a military career in the Royal Engineers, he rose to captain in 1846, lieutenant-colonel in 1854, brevet-colonel in 1858, and in 1859 was promoted to full colonel.

On 30 July 1860, he was appointed acting Governor of British Ceylon, a post he held until 22 October 1860 when he was succeeded by Charles Justin MacCarthy.

In 1866, he achieved his final promotion to major-general and died on 3 June 1870, aged 68 or 69, at his London home, his will being proved in London on 24 June 1870 and in Dublin on 22 August 1870 with effects valued at under 30,000 pounds (equivalent to about 2.6 million pounds in 2015).

== Family ==
On 12 July 1837, he married Mary Drought Armstrong (1806–1902), daughter of an Irish landowner John Warneford Armstrong (1770–1858) and his wife Anne Turner (−1869), and they had six children, two of whom married:

- Lora St Lo Elizabeth Wilkinson (1838–1934) in 1880 married John Ball (−1887): and
- Charles St Lo Wilkinson (1849–1927) who in 1887 married Jessie Simons (1864-after 1927).

Lora left a diary of her time in Ceylon in 1860, excerpts from which can be read here.

Government offices
| Preceded by Henry Frederick Lockyer acting governor | acting Governor of British Ceylon; 1860-1860 | Succeeded by Charles Justin MacCarthy |
