= James Justinian Morier =

British diplomat and author (1782–1849)

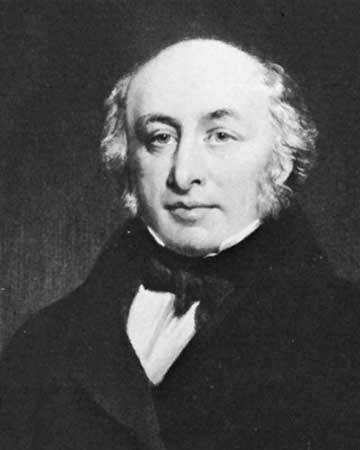
- Morier, portrait by an unknown artist
- Born: James Justinian Morier; 15 August 1782; Smyrna, Ottoman Empire (Note: "Morier, James Justinian". Oxford Dictionary of National Biography (online ed.). Oxford University Press. doi:10.1093/ref:odnb/19259. (Subscription, Wikipedia Library access or UK public library membership required.) 23 September 2004. Stanley Lane-Poole, revised by Elizabeth Baigent. Retrieved 5 January 2019. The encyclopedia biography gives the dates and places of birth and death and the cause of death stated here. There are sources for other dates. Encyclopædia Britannica gives a lifespan of c. 1780 to 19 March 1849 (as of 2002, reported by the Library of Congress, or LCCN), which is revised from 1780 to 23 March 1849 (as of 1911, below). LCCN: n80-013276 notes reported birth years of 1780, possibly 1780 or 1782, and 1784.)
- Died: 19 March 1849 (aged 66); Brighton, England
- Occupations: Novelist, diplomat
- Writing career
- Notable work: The Adventures of Hajji Baba of Ispahan

James Justinian Morier (15 August 1782 – 19 March 1849) was a British diplomat and author noted for his novels about the Qajar dynasty in Iran, most famously for the Hajji Baba series.

== Early life ==
Morier was born in Ottoman Smyrna, the second son of Isaac Morier, a Swiss-born merchant, British by naturalisation, and a member of the London-based Levant Company, and Elizabeth Clara Van Lennep. After private education in England, he worked in his father's Smyrna business between 1799 and 1806.

== Diplomatic career ==
=== Career in Iran ===
Through the influence of his uncle, Admiral William Waldegrave, 1st Baron Radstock, he entered the diplomatic service. He first visited Iran in 1808 as secretary to Harford Jones-Brydges, a special British envoy to the Shah, publishing an account of his experiences in 1812 under the title A Journey through Iran, Armenia and Asia Minor to Constantinople in the years 1808 and 1809. In 1809 he accompanied the Iranian envoy, Mirza Abul Hasan, to Britain, and in 1810 returned to Iran as Secretary of Embassy on the staff of Sir Gore Ouseley, first Ambassador to Iran. He remained there as Chargé d'Affaires in 1814–1816. After his return to England he published A second journey through Persia, Armenia, and Asia Minor, to Constantinople, between the years 1810 and 1816.

=== Commissioner to Mexico ===
Morier married Harriet Fulke Greville in London in 1820. Between 1824 and 1826 he was special commissioner to Mexico, where he negotiated a British-Mexican Treaty of Amity, Commerce and Navigation ratified in 1827.

== Writing career ==
With his knowledge of Eastern life and manners, Morier wrote several entertaining novels. The most popular were The Adventures of Hajji Baba of Ispahan (1824) and its sequel, The Adventures of Hajji Baba of Ispahan in England (1828). The former novel is a sort of Gil Blas set in Persia. The Persian minister to England is said to have protested in behalf of his government against its satire and manner of speaking. There followed Zohrab the Hostage (1832), Ayesha the Maid of Kars (1834), and The Mirza (1841), all full of brilliant description, character-painting, and delicate satire, and several others of lesser quality.

The Adventures of Hajji Baba of Ispahan has been reprinted many times, with bibliophile editions from Random House in 1937 designed and illustrated by Cyrus Leroy Baldridge and from The Heritage Press in 1947 illustrated by Honoré Guilbeau. Some later editions have been prefaced by Walter Scott's generous appreciation of Morier's work, first published in the Quarterly Review in January 1829. A Persian translation of the book was produced by Douglas Craven Phillott.

== Death ==
Morier died suddenly in Brighton of "cerebral congestion" on 19 March 1849. His wife died in London in 1858.

== Legacy ==
The Adventures of Hajji Baba is an American movie, based on the Hajji Baba novels, which was produced in 1954.

Operation Hajji Baba, a humanitarian airlift operation conducted in 1952 by the US Air Force, took its name from the Hajji Baba novels.

Morier is credited with introducing into English the word "bosh", meaning absurd or foolish talk. It derives from the Turkish word boş meaning "empty".

In 1842, botanist Boiss. published Moriera a genus of flowering plants from Central Asia, belonging to the family Brassicaceae in his honour.

== Notes ==
=== References ===
- Cousin, John William (1910), "Morier, James Justinian", A Short Biographical Dictionary of English Literature, London: J. M. Dent & Sons – via Wikisource
- Johnston, Henry McKenzie. Ottoman and Iranian (Persian) Odysseys. I B Tauris & Co Ltd, 1998.
- Boyne, Walter J. "The Pilgrim Airlift". Air Force Magazine, March 2007.
- "Hajji Baba of Ispahan" . New International Encyclopedia. 1905.
