= William Morier =

British naval officer

Admiral William Morier (25 September 1790 – 29 July 1864) was a British naval officer.

== Early life ==
He was born at Smyrna on 25 September 1790, the fourth son of Isaac Morier, British consul-general at Constantinople. He was educated at Harrow School.

== Career ==
Morier was an officer in the British Navy.

== Personal life ==
He married Frances Lee "Fanny" Bevan, daughter of the banker, David Bevan.

== Death ==
He died at Eastbourne on 29 July 1864.
