= George Muskett =

British banker and politician (1785–1843)

George Alfred Muskett (1785-31 January 1843) was a British banker and politician, who served as the Member of Parliament for St Albans from 1837 to 1841.

Muskett began his career as a partner in a chemical works in Southwark, which produced dyes and varnishes. In 1808, he eloped with Mary Ann Hapgood, an eighteen-year-old heiress; as she was a ward of court, this was illegal without the court's permission, and Muskett was imprisoned in the Fleet. With the aid of his lawyer, Samuel Romilly, Muskett arranged a settlement and was released. Mary Ann died the following year, in April 1809, leaving all her inheritance to Muskett. He remarried in 1811, to Sarah Cook (a cousin of Mary Ann), with whom he had two daughters, Mary Ann and Selina. Using his first wife's fortune, Muskett's business ventures expanded heavily over the following years, owning a large number of properties in and around London, as well as tin mines in Cornwall and the Cilgwyn (Kilgwin) quarry in Wales. He purchased a manor house and estate in Rickmansworth.

Muskett's major business venture was the Bank of St Albans, established in 1834; the chief clerk, Henry Edwards, was the Liberal election agent, and the "professional advisor" was the town clerk, Thomas Ward Blagg. Muskett may have already been in financial trouble when the bank was established, and it is possible that money was embezzled from local businesses and charities by Blagg in order to keep it in business.

Muskett was elected as a liberal in the 1837 general election and defeated at the 1841 general election. He was a member of the Reform Club. His initial election may have been supported by bribery using money funnelled through his bank.

In December 1842, one Charles Muskett was charged with keeping a brothel in Regent Street; when reporting this, the Times identified him as George Muskett. Muskett complained and attempted to bring a lawsuit for libel, which was refused by the court on 19 January. On 31 January, a short while later, Muskett visited his brother in London, and died suddenly there. He was survived by his two daughters. His death was suggested by contemporaries to be in part connected with the stress of the recent lawsuit, though a modern historian has also suggested it may have been suicide. The St Albans Bank collapsed shortly after his death, with liabilities of almost £20,000.
