= Levant Company =

English chartered company (1592–1825)

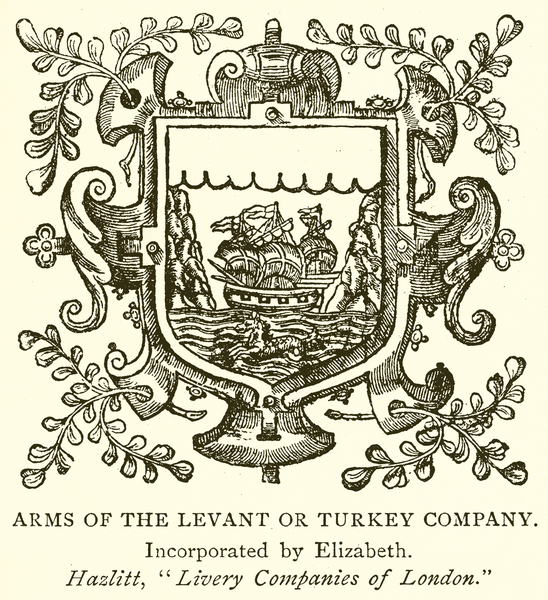
- Coat of arms of the Levant Company
- Type: Public chartered
- Industry: International trade
- Predecessor: Venice Company; Turkey Company
- Founded: 11 September 1592
- Founder: Sir Edward Osborne
- Defunct: 19 May 1825
- Fate: Dissolved by the Dissolution of Levant Company Act 1825 (c. 33 6 Geo. 4); consular establishments taken over by the Board of Trade
- Headquarters: London, England; Aleppo, Ottoman Syria
- Number of locations: Various across Europe and Near East
- Area served: Eastern Mediterranean
- Products: Rum and spices; cloth: cottons and woollens, kerseys, indigo, gall, camlet; tin, pewter, maroquin, soda ash
- Services: Trade and commerce
- Total assets: Merchant shipping
- Total equity: Joint-stock capital company
- Owner: Government of England (1592–1707); Government of Great Britain (1707–1800); Government of the United Kingdom of Great Britain and Ireland (1800–1825)
- Number of employees: 6,000
- Parent: English/British Crown
- Divisions: Turkish, Levantine, Venetian littoral

The Levant Company was an English chartered company formed in 1592. Elizabeth I of England approved its initial charter on 11 September 1592 when the Venice Company (1583) and the Turkey Company (1581) merged, because their charters had expired, as she was eager to maintain trade and political alliances with the Ottoman Empire. Its initial charter was good for seven years and was granted to Edward Osborne, Richard Staper, Thomas Smith and William Garrard with the purpose of regulating English trade with the Ottoman Empire and the Levant. The company remained in continuous existence until being superseded in 1825. A member of the company was known as a Turkey Merchant.

== History ==
The origins of the Levant Company lay in the Italian trade with Constantinople, and the wars against the Turks in Hungary, although a parallel was routed to Morocco and the Barbary Coast on a similar trade winds as early as 1413. The collapse of the Venetian empire, high tariffs, and the ousting of the Genoese from Scio (Chios) had left a vacuum that was filled by a few intrepid adventurers in their own cog vessels with endeavour to reopen trade with the East on their own accounts. Following a decline in trade with the Levant over a number of decades, several London merchants petitioned Queen Elizabeth I in 1580 for a charter to guarantee exclusivity when trading in that region. In 1580 a treaty was signed between England and the Ottoman Empire, giving English merchants trading rights similar to those enjoyed by French merchants. In 1582, William Harborne, an English merchant who had carried out most of the treaty negotiations in Constantinople to French protestations, made himself permanent envoy. But by 1586 Harborne was appointed 'Her Majesty's ambassador' to the Ottoman Empire, with all his expenses (including gifts given to the Sultan and his court) to be paid by the Levant Company.

When the charters of the Venice Company and the Turkey Company expired, both companies were merged into the Levant Company in 1592 after Queen Elizabeth I approved its charter as part of her diplomacy with the Ottoman Empire.

The company had no colonial aspirations, but rather established "factories" (trading centres) in already-established commercial centres, such as the Levant Factory in Aleppo, as well as Constantinople, Alexandria and Smyrna. Throughout the company's history, Aleppo functioned as the central hub for the entire Middle East operations. By 1588, the Levant Company had been converted to a regulated monopoly on an established trade route, from its initial character as a joint-stock company. The prime movers in the conversion were Sir Edward Osborne and Richard Staper.

In January 1592, a new charter was granted and by 1595 its character as a regulated company had become clear. In the early days of the company there were threats not just from Barbary pirates but also from Spain during the 1585 to 1604 war. In that conflict however the company with its heavily armed ships managed to repel the Spanish galleys intent on capturing the cargo in a number of pitched naval battles, in 1586, 1590, 1591 and 1600 The company as a result surrendered some of their ships to the English Crown and these were used during the Spanish Armada campaign, proving their worth.

James I (1603–25) renewed and confirmed the company's charter in 1606, adding new privileges. However he engaged in a verbal anti-Turk crusade and neglected direct relations with the Turks. The government did not interfere with trade, which expanded. Especially profitable was the arms trade as the Porte modernised and re-equipped its forces. Of growing importance was textile exports. Between 1609 and 1619, the export of cloth to the Turks increased from 46% to 79% of total cloth exports. The business was highly lucrative. Piracy continued to be a threat. Despite the anti-Ottoman rhetoric of the king, commercial relations with the Turks expanded. The king's finances were increasingly based on the revenues derived from this trade, and English diplomacy was complicated by this trade. For example, James refused to provide financial support to Poland for its war against the Turks.

During the English Civil War (1642–1651), some innovations were made in the government of the company, allowing many people to become members who were not qualified by the charters of Elizabeth and James, or who did not conform to the regulations prescribed. Charles II, upon his restoration, endeavored to set the company upon its original basis; to which end, he gave them a charter, containing not only a confirmation of their old one, but also several new articles of reformation.

== Organisation in 1661 ==
By the charter of King Charles II in 1661, the company was erected into a body politic, capable of making laws, under the title of the Company of Merchants of England trading to the Seas of the Levant. The number of members was not limited, but averaged about 300. The principal qualification required was that the candidate be a wholesale merchant, either by family, or by serving an apprenticeship of seven years. Those under 25 years of age paid 25 pounds at their admission; those above, twice as much. Each made an oath, at his entrance, not to send any merchandise to the Levant, except on his own account; and not to consign them to any but the company's agents, or factors. The company governed itself by a plurality of voices.

The company had a court, or board at London, composed of a governor, sub-governor, and twelve directors, or assistants; who were all actually to live in London, or the suburbs. They also had a deputy-governor, in every city and port where there were any members of the company. This assembly at London sent out the vessels, regulated the tariff for the price at which the European merchandise sent to the Levant were to be sold; and for the quality of those returned. It raised taxes on merchandise, to defray impositions, and the common expense of the company; presented the ambassador, which the King was to keep at the port; elected two consuls for Smyrna and Constantinople, etc. As the post of ambassador to the Sublime Porte became increasingly important, the Crown had to assume control of the appointment.

One of the best regulations of the company was not to leave the consuls, or even the ambassador, to fix the impositions on the vessels for defraying the common expenses—something that was fatal to the companies of most other nations—but to allow a pension to the ambassador and consuls, and even to the chief officers—including the chancellor, secretary, chaplain, interpreters, and janissaries—so that there was no pretence for their raising any sum at all on the merchants or merchandises. It was true that the ambassador and consul might act alone on these occasions, but the pensions being offered to them on condition of declining them, they chose not to act.

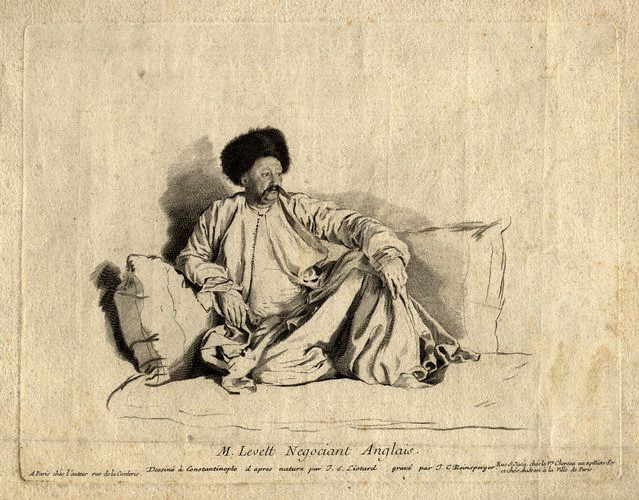
Portrait in Turkish costume of Turkey merchant Francis Levett (1700–1764), chief representative of the Levant Company at Constantinople, 1737–1750

In extraordinary cases, the consuls, and even ambassador himself, had recourse to two deputies of the company, residing in the Levant, or if the affair be very important, assemble the whole nation. Here were regulated the presents to be given, the voyages to be made, and every thing to be deliberated; and on the resolutions here taken, the deputies appointed the treasurer to furnish the required funds. The ordinary commerce of this company employed from 20 to 25 vessels, of between 25 and 30 pieces of cannon.

The merchandises exported there were limited in quality and range, suggesting an imbalance of trade; they included traditional cloths, especially shortcloth and kerseys, tin, pewter, lead, black pepper, re-exported cochineal, black rabbit skins and a great deal of American silver, which the English took up at Cádiz. The more valuable returns were in raw silk, cotton wool and yarn, currants and raisins, nutmeg, black pepper, indigo, galls, camlets, wool and cotton cloth, the soft leathers called maroquins, soda ash for making glass and soap, and several gums and medicinal drugs. Velvet, carpets, and silk were bought by the traders.

The commerce of the company to Smyrna, Constantinople, and İskenderun, was much less considerable than that of the East India Company; but was, more advantageous to England, because it took off much more of the English products than the other, which was chiefly carried on in money. The places reserved for the commerce of this company included all the states of Venice, in the Gulf of Venice; the state of Ragusa; all the states of the "Grand Signior" (the Ottoman Sultan), and the ports of the Levant and Mediterranean Basin; excepting Cartagena, Alicante, Barcelona, Valencia, Marseille, Toulon, Genoa, Livorno (Leghorn), Civitavecchia, Palermo, Messina, Malta, Mallorca, Menorca, and Corsica; and other places on the coasts of France, Spain, and Italy.

=== Levantine shipping ===
Ships owned by the Levant Company from 1581 to 1640:

- Alathia
- Alcede
- Aleppo Merchant
- Alice and Thomas
- Alice Thomas
- Angel
- Anne Frane
- Ascension
- Bark Burre
- Barque Reynolds
- Centurion
- Charity
- Cherubim
- Christ
- Clement
- Cock
- Concord
- Consent
- Cosklett
- Darling
- Delight
- Desire
- Diamond
- Dragon
- Eagle
- Edward Bonaventure
- Elizabeth and Dorcas
- Elizabeth Cocken
- Elizabeth Stoaks
- Elnathan
- Emanuel
- Experience
- Freeman
- George Bonaventure
- Gift of God
- Golden Noble
- Grayhound
- Great Phoenix
- Great Suzanne
- Greenfield
- Guest
- Gyllyon
- Harry
- Harry Bonaventure
- Hector
- Hercules
- Husband
- Industry
- The Jane
- Jesus
- Jewel
- Job
- John
- John Francis
- Jollian
- Jonas
- Lanavit
- Lewis
- Little George
- London
- Margaret
- Margaret Bonaventure
- Marget and John
- Marigold
- Mary
- Mary Anne
- Mary Coust
- Mary Martin
- Mary Rose
- Mayflower
- Merchant Bonaventure
- Mignon
- Paragon
- Peregrine
- Phoenix
- Primrose
- Prosperous
- Providence
- Rainbow
- Rebecca
- Recovery
- Red Lion
- Report
- Resolution
- Roebuck
- Royal Defence
- Royal Exchange
- Royal Merchant
- Saker
- Salamander
- Salutation
- Samaritan
- Sampson
- Samuel
- Saphire
- Scipio
- Society
- Solomon
- Suzanne
- Suzanne Parnell
- Swallow
- Teagre
- Thomas and William
- Thomas Bonaventure
- Thomasine
- Toby of Harwich
- Trinity
- Trinity Bear
- Triumph
- Unicorn
- White Hind
- William and John
- William and Ralph
- William and Thomas
- William Fortune

== Governors ==
- 1581–1592 Sir Edward Osborne (nominated in first & second charters)
- 1592–1592 Richard Staper
- 1600–1600 Sir Thomas Smith (nominated in third charter)
- 1605–1623 Sir Thomas Lowe (nominated in fourth charter)
- 1623–1634 Sir Hugh Hammersley
- 1634–1643 Sir Henry Garraway
- 1643–1653 Isaac Penington
- 1654–1672 Sir Andrew Riccard
- 1672–1673 John Jolliffe
- 1673–1695 The Earl of Berkeley
- 1696–1709 Sir William Trumbull
- 1710–1718 The Lord Onslow
- 1718–1735 The Earl of Carnavon
- 1736–1766 The Earl De La Warr
- 1766–1772 The Earl of Shaftsbury
- 1772–1776 The Earl of Radnor
- 1776–1792 The Earl of Guilford
- 1792–1799 The Duke of Leeds
- 1799–1821 The Lord Grenville

The British government took over the company in 1821 until its dissolution in 1825.

== The ambassadors at Constantinople ==
- 1582–1588 William Harborne
- 1588–1597 Edward Barton
- 1597–1607 Henry Lello
- 1606–1611 Sir Thomas Glover
- 1611–1620 Sir Paul Pindar
- 1619–1621 Sir John Eyre (or Ayres)
- 1621–1622 John Chapman (agent)
- 1621–1628 Sir Thomas Roe
- 1627–1638 Sir Peter Wyche
- 1633–1647 Sir Sackville Crowe
- 1647–1661 Sir Thomas Bendysh
- Richard Salway (never sent out)
- Richard Lawrence (agent only)
- 1668–1672 Heneage Finch, Earl of Winchilsea
- 1668–1672 Sir Daniel Harvey
- 1672–1681 Sir John Finch
- 1680–1687 James, Lord Chandos
- 1684–1686 Sir William Soames
- 1686–1691 Sir William Trumbull
- 1690–1691 Sir William Hussey
- Thomas Coke (chargé d'affaires only)
- 1691–1692 William Harbord
- 1692–1702 William, Lord Paget
- Sir James Rushout, 1st Baronet (nominated only)
- George Berkeley, 1st Earl of Berkeley (nominated only)
- 1700–1717 Sir Robert Sutton
- 1716–1718 Edward Wortley-Montagu
- 1717–1730 Abraham Stanyan
- 1729–1736 George Hay, 8th Earl of Kinnoull
- 1735–1746 Sir Everard Fawkener
- Stanhope Aspinwall (chargé d'affaires only)
- 1746–1762 James Porter
- 1761–1765 Henry Grenville
- William Kinloch (chargé d'affaires only)
- 1765–1775 John Murray
- Anthony Hayes (Chargé d'affaires only)
- 1775–1794 Sir Robert Ainslie
- 1794–1795 Robert Liston
- Spencer Smith (Chargé d'affaires)
- Francis James Jackson (never took up appointment)
- 1799–1803 Thomas Bruce, 7th Earl of Elgin
- Alexander Straton (Chargé d'affaires)
- 1803–1804 William Drummond
- 1804–1807 Charles Arbuthnot
- 1809–1810 Robert Adair
- 1810–1812 Stratford Canning Minister Plenipotentiary
- 1812–1820 Robert Liston
- 1820–1824 Percy Clinton, 6th Viscount Strangford

== Consuls ==
=== At Smyrna ===
- 1611–1624 William Markham
- 1624–1630 William Salter
- 1630–1633 Lawrence Green
- 1633–1634 James Higgins
- 1634–1635 John Freeman
- 1635–1638 Edward Bernard
- 1638–1643 Edward Stringer
- 1644–1649 John Wilde
- 1649–1657 Spencer Bretton
- 1659–1660 William Prideaux
- 1660–1661 Richard Baker
- 1661–1667 William Cave
- 1667–1677 Paul Rycaut
- 1677–1703 William Raye
- 1703–1716 William Sherrard
- 1716–1722 John Cooke
- 1722–1723 George Boddington
- 1733–1741 Francis Williams
- 1741–1742 Thomas Carleton
- 1742–1762 Samuel Crawley
- 1762–1794 Anthony Hayes
- 1794–1825 Francis Werry

=== At Aleppo ===
- 1580–1586 William Barrett
- 1586–1586 James Toverson
- 1586–1586 John Eldred
- 1592–1594 Michael Locke
- 1596 George Dorrington (acting vice-consul)
- 1596–1596 Thomas Sandys
- 1596–1597 Ralph Fitch
- 1597–1597 Richard Colthurst
- vacant
- 1606 James Hawarde (acting vice-consul)
- 1606–1610 Sir Paul Pindar
- 1610–1616 Bartholomew Haggatt
- 1616–1621 Libby Chapman
- 1621–1627 Edward Kirkham
- 1627–1630 Thomas Potton
- 1630–1638 John Wandesford
- 1638–1649 Edward Bernard
- 1649–1659 Henry Riley
- 1659–1672 Benjamin Lannoy
- 1672–1686 Gamaliel Nightingale
- 1686–1689 Thomas Metcalfe
- 1689–1701 Henry Hastings
- 1701–1706 George Brandon
- 1707–1715 William Pilkington
- 1716–1726 John Purnell
- 1727–1740 Nevil Coke
- 1740–1745 Nathaniel Micklethwait
- 1745–1751 Arthur Pollard
- 1751–1758 Alexander Drummond
- 1758–1758 Francis Browne
- 1759–1766 William Kinloch
- 1766–1768 Henry Preston
- 1768–1770 William Clark
- 1770–1772 Charles Smith (pro-consul)
- 1770–1783 John Abbott
- 1783–1784 David Hays (pro-consul)
- 1784–1786 Charles Smith (pro-consul)
- 1786–1791 Michael de Vezin (pro-consul)
- factory closed 1791–1803
- 1803–1825 John Barker

=== Shipping numbers: Turkey and the Levant ===
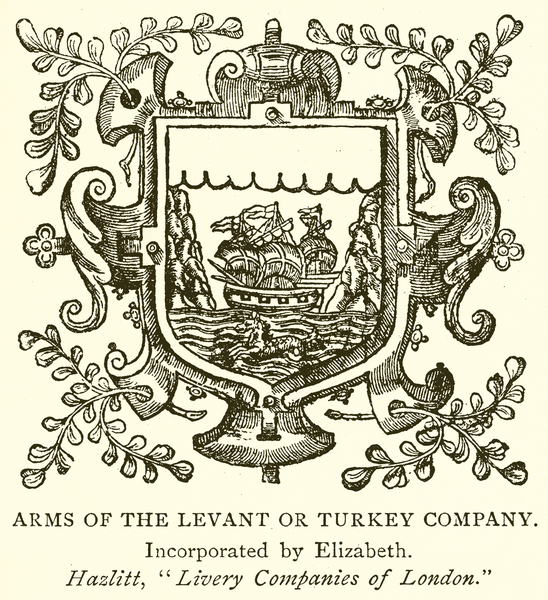
Coat of arms of the Levant Company

Year	Outward ships	Inward ships
1800	6	14
1801	10	7
1802	18	19
1803	9	27
1804	1	13
1805	6	16
1806	1	18
1814	18	44
1815	13	44
1816	18	26
1817	21	45
1818	29	87
1819	40	53
1820	50	90
1821	31	53
1822	34	53
1823	40	87
1824	122	138
1825	95	167
1826	79	109
1827	61	101
1828	45	93
1829	74	73
1830	95	95

== Decline ==
Levant Trade Act 1753
- Act of Parliament
- Parliament of Great Britain
- Long title: An Act for enlarging and regulating the Trade into The Levant Seas.
- Citation: 26 Geo. 2. c. 18
- Territorial extent: Great Britain

Dates
- Royal assent: 15 May 1753
- Commencement: 24 June 1753 (Note: Section 1.)
- Repealed: 10 June 1825
Other legislation
Repealed by	Dissolution of Levant Company Act 1825

Status: Repealed

Text of statute as originally enacted

Dissolution of Levant Company Act 1825
- Act of Parliament
- Parliament of the United Kingdom
- Long title: An Act to repeal certain Acts relating to the Governor and Company of Merchants of England trading to the Levant Seas, and the Duties payable to them; and to authorize the Transfer and Disposal of the Possessions and Property of the said Governor and Company, for the Public Service.
- Citation: 6 Geo. 4. c. 33
- Territorial extent: United Kingdom

Dates
- Royal assent: 10 June 1825
- Commencement: 10 June 1825 (Note: The Acts of Parliament (Commencement) Act 1793.)
- Repealed: 5 August 1873
Other legislation
Amends	Trade with Ireland Act 1780; Importation in Neutral Vessel, etc. Act 1803; Trade of Malta Act 1815; Gibraltar Trade Act 1817
Repeals/revokes	Levant Trade Act 1753; Levant Company's Dues Act 1819
Repealed by	Statute Law Revision Act 1873

Status: Repealed

Text of statute as originally enacted

Membership began declining in the early eighteenth century. In its decline the company was looked upon as an abuse, a drain on the resources of Britain. The company's purview was thrown open to free trade in 1754 by the Levant Trade Act 1753 (26 Geo. 2. c. 18), but continued its activities until dissolution by the Dissolution of Levant Company Act 1825 (6 Geo. 4. c. 33).

The name of the bird called 'turkey' came from the Turkey merchants.

Turkish opium was bought by the Levant Company.

The Levant Company encompassed American merchants before 1811 who bought Turkish opium. These merchants would sell the opium to the Chinese, beginning in 1806. Among these American Turkey merchants were members of the famous Astor family.

== Heraldry ==
Flag of the Levant Company

The arms of the Levant Company were: Azure, on a sea in base proper, a ship with three masts in full sail or, between two rocks of the second, all the sails, pennants, and ensigns argent, each charged with a cross gules, a chief engrailed of the third, in base a seahorse proper. * The crest was: On a wreath of the colours, a demi seahorse saliant.

- The supporters were: Two seahorses.
- The Latin motto was: Deo reip et amicis.

== See also ==
- Chartered companies
- British foreign policy in the Middle East
- Turkey–United Kingdom relations

== Bibliography ==
=== Manuscripts ===
- Fawkener, W (19 October 1790). Add MSS Memorandum (ff. 80–97): from the Office of the Committee of the Privy Council for trade) to the Dukes of Leeds on the Turkey Company trade.
- Harley MSS, 306 Standing Ordinances of the Levant Company (ff. 72–74) c. 1590
- Lansdowne MSS. 60 Petition of the Turkey and Venice Merchants to be incorporated into one body (f.8) c. 1590–91
- MSS Bodleian Library Folio 665, (i List of the Membership of The Levant Company, 1701 (ff. 97–98)
- British Museum, 1718. Paragraphs of Some Letters to Prove the Reasonablness of The Levant Company 's late order to carry on their trade by general ships, Bodleian Pamphlets, Folio 666, ff. 288–89.
- 1718–1719, The Case of The Levant Company, British Museum. 351–356, 6(40)
- 1825, Proceedings of The Levant Company respecting the Surrender of their Charters, BM6/6259
- Levant Company Handbook and Register of Orders and Letters (1719-1720; 1730-1732), MS E101, MS G17, Kenneth Spencer Research Library, University of Kansas.

=== Sources ===
- Calendar of State Papers, Venetian 1581–1591
- Calendar of State Papers, Domestic 1547–1580
- Bent, J. T. (October 1890). "The English in The Levant Company". English Historical Review. 5.
- Epstein, M. (1908). The Early History of the Levant Company. London; New York: George Routledge & Sons; Dutton. Covers the years of the periodic charterers, 1581–1605 and the permanent charter to 1640.
- Eysturlid, Lee W. (Winter 1993). "Where Everything is Weighed in the Scales of Material Interest: Anglo-Turkish Trade, Picary, and Diplomacy in the Mediterranean during the Jacobean Period". Journal of European Economic History. 22 (3).
- Lans-Poole, S. (1833). The Life of Stratford Canning. Vol. 2 vols. London.
- Mather, James (2009). Pashas: Traders and Travellers in the Islamic World. Yale University Press. ISBN 978-0300170917.
- Rosedale, H.G. (1904). Queen Elizabeth and The Levant Company. London: Henry Frowde.
- Paget, Sir Arthur (1896). Diplomatic Correspondence and Other Correspondence. Vol. 2 vols. London: Heinemann.
- Wood, Alfred C. (1935). A History of the Levant Company. Oxford: Oxford University Press.
