= The Adventures of Hajji Baba of Ispahan =

1824 novel by James Justinian Morier

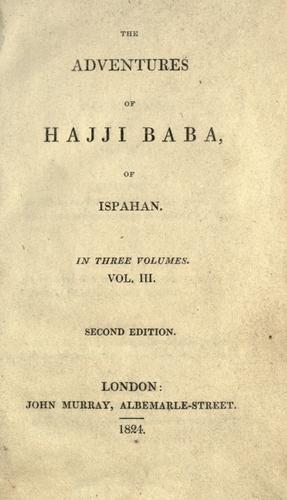
The title page of the second edition of The adventures of Hajji Baba of Ispahan

The Adventures of Hajji Baba of Ispahan is a satirical Oriental novel in English. It was written in 1824 by James Justinian Morier, a former British envoy who lived in Qajar Iran in 1808–1809 and 1810–1814, amidst the diplomatic difficulties that the country had with European nations. It was followed by a sequel The Adventures of Hajji Baba of Ispahan in England in 1828.

With a distinctly negative and satirical undertone, Morier based this novel on his own experiences and personal understanding of Iran.

== Sources ==
- Amanat, Abbas (2003). "Hajji Baba of Ispahan". In Yarshater, Ehsan (ed.). Encyclopædia Iranica. Vol. XI/6: Ḥājj Sayyāḥ–Harem I. London and New York: Routledge & Kegan Paul. pp. 561–568. ISBN 978-0-933273-70-2.
