= 714th Bombardment Squadron =

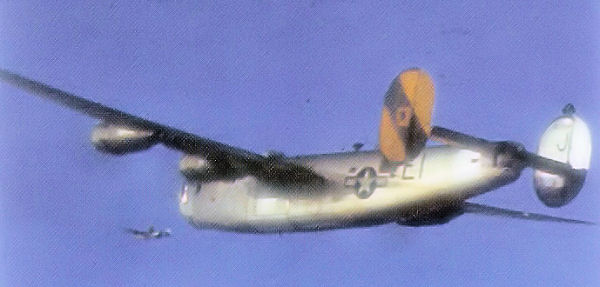
- 714th Squadron B-24 Liberator
- Active: 1943–1946; 1947–1951
- Country: United States
- Branch: United States Air Force
- Role: Bombardment
- Engagements: European Theater of Operations

Insignia
- 714th Bombardment Squadron emblem (Note: Approved 25 November 1943. Description: On a light turquoise blue disc, border dark red, a caricatured Indian boy deep flesh color, hair black, and having an expression of ferocity on his face, wearing headdress with one feather, loin cloth and moccasins, all yellow, shaded yellow orange, stalking across a white cloud formation, casting a grayed blue violet drop shadow, carrying a large blue violet aerial bomb on the left shoulder, and holding a tomahawk grayed blue violet with yellow orange handle in the right hand.)
- World War II fuselage code: EI

The 714th Bombardment Squadron is an inactive United States Air Force unit. It was last assigned to the 448th Bombardment Group at Long Beach Municipal Airport, California, where it was inactivated on 21 March 1951.

The squadron was first activated during World War II. After training in the United States, it deployed to the European Theater of Operations, and served in the strategic bombing campaign against Germany with the 448th Bombardment Group. After V-E Day, the squadron returned to the United States, where it converted to the Boeing B-29 Superfortress. It was inactivated in August 1946 and replaced by another unit. The squadron was active in the reserve from 1947 until 1951, when it was mobilized for the Korean War and inactivated after its personnel were used to man other units.

== History ==
=== World War II ===
==== Training in the United States ====
The squadron was first activated on 1 May 1943 at Gowen Field, Idaho as one of the original four squadrons of the 448th Bombardment Group. After completing initial training with Consolidated B-24 Liberators, it moved to Wendover Field, Utah for Phase 2 training, and to Sioux City Army Air Base, Iowa for final training. The ground echelon moved to Camp Shanks, New York and sailed for England aboard the RMS Queen Elizabeth on 23 November. The air echelon completed final processing at Herington Army Air Field, Kansas and deployed with their Liberators via the southern ferry route.

==== Combat in Europe ====
The squadron flew its first combat mission from RAF Seething on 22 December 1943. it was primarily engaged in the strategic bombing campaign against Germany, attacking ball bearing plants in Berlin, marshalling yards at Cologne, a V-1 flying bomb assembly plant at Fallersleben, aircraft factories in Gotha, an airfield at Hanau, a chemical plant at Ludwigshafen, synthetic oil refineries near Pölitz, aircraft engine plants at Rostock, among other strategic targets. The squadron participated in Big Week, an intensive campaign against German aircraft manufacturing plants from 20 to 25 February 1944.

The squadron was occasionally diverted from its strategic bombing mission to fly interdiction and close air support missions. It bombed V-weapon launch sites, airfields and transportation facilities to support Operation Overlord, the invasion of Normandy, and on D-Day attacked coastal defenses and choke points on German lines of communication. It struck enemy positions to assist the allied attacks on Caen and Operation Cobra, the breakout at Saint Lo. It dropped supplies to allied troops during Operation Market Garden, the attempt to seize a bridgehead across the Rhine in the Netherlands. During the Battle of the Bulge, it attacked transportation and communications targets in December 1944 and January 1945. In the spring of 1945, it again dropped supplies to airborne troops in Operation Varsity, the airborne assault across the Rhine near Wesel. The squadron flew its last combat mission on 25 April 1945, an attack on a railroad yard near Salzburg, Austria.

The air echelon began returning to the United States with their planes in June 1945, while the ground echelon sailed from Greenock on the RMS Queen Mary on 6 July. Squadron members were given leave upon arrival in the States and the squadron began to assemble at Sioux Falls Army Air Field, South Dakota in the middle of the month. After training with the Boeing B-29 Superfortress, the squadron moved to Fort Worth Army Air Field, Texas in December 1945. At Fort Worth, it became one of the first units of Strategic Air Command in March 1946. However, in August the squadron was inactivated and its personnel and equipment were transferred to the 327th Bombardment Squadron, which was simultaneously activated.

=== Air Force reserve ===
The squadron was reactivated as a reserve unit under Air Defense Command (ADC) at Long Beach Army Air Field, California in August 1947, where its training was supervised by the 416th AAF Base Unit (later the 2347th Air Force Reserve Training Center). Although nominally a B-29 unit, it is not clear whether or not the squadron was fully staffed or equipped. In 1948 Continental Air Command (ConAC) assumed responsibility for managing reserve and Air National Guard units from ADC. In June 1949 ConAC reorganized its reserve units under the wing base organization, and the squadron became a Douglas B-26 Invader unit of the 448th Bombardment Wing. However, it was staffed at 25% of normal strength.

In August 1950, the 448th Wing's companion reserve unit at Long Beach, the 452d Bombardment Wing, was mobilized for Korean War service. In order to bring the 452d Wing to combat strength, skilled reservists and reservists who required 60 or fewer days training to qualify them as fully skilled assigned to the 448th Wing were transferred to the 452d Wing. The 714th Squadron itself was called to active duty in the second wave of mobilization in March 1951 and its personnel who had not been transferred to the 452d Wing were used as fillers for other Air Force organizations, while the squadron was inactivated four days later.

== Lineage ==
- Constituted as the 714th Bombardment Squadron (Heavy) on 6 April 1943

Activated on 1 May 1943
Redesignated 714th Bombardment Squadron, Heavy on 20 August 1943
Redesignated 714th Bombardment Squadron, Very Heavy on 5 August 1945
Inactivated on 4 August 1946

- Activated in the reserve on 12 July 1947

Redesignated 714th Bombardment Squadron, Light on 27 June 1949
Ordered to active service on 17 March 1951
Inactivated on 21 March 1951

=== Assignments ===
- 448th Bombardment Group, 1 May 1943 – 4 August 1946
- 448th Bombardment Group, 12 July 1947 – 21 March 1951

=== Stations ===
- Gowen Field, Idaho, 1 May 1943
- Wendover Field, Utah, 4 July 1943
- Sioux City Army Air Base, Iowa, 11 September-7 November 1943
- RAF Seething (AAF-146), England, 25 November 1943 – 5 July 1945
- Sioux Falls Army Air Field, South Dakota, 15 July 1945
- McCook Army Air Field, Nebraska, 25 July 1945
- Biggs Field, Texas, 23 August 1945
- McCook Army Air Field, Nebraska, 8 September 1945
- Fort Worth Army Air Field, Texas, 15 December 1945 – 4 August 1946
- Long Beach Army Air Field (later Long Beach Municipal Airport), California, 12 July 1947 – 21 March 1951

=== Aircraft ===
- Consolidated B-24 Liberator, 1943–1945
- Boeing B-29 Superfortress, 1945–1946
- Douglas B-26 Invader, 1949–1950
