= 712th Expeditionary Air Refueling Squadron =

712th Air Refueling Squadron
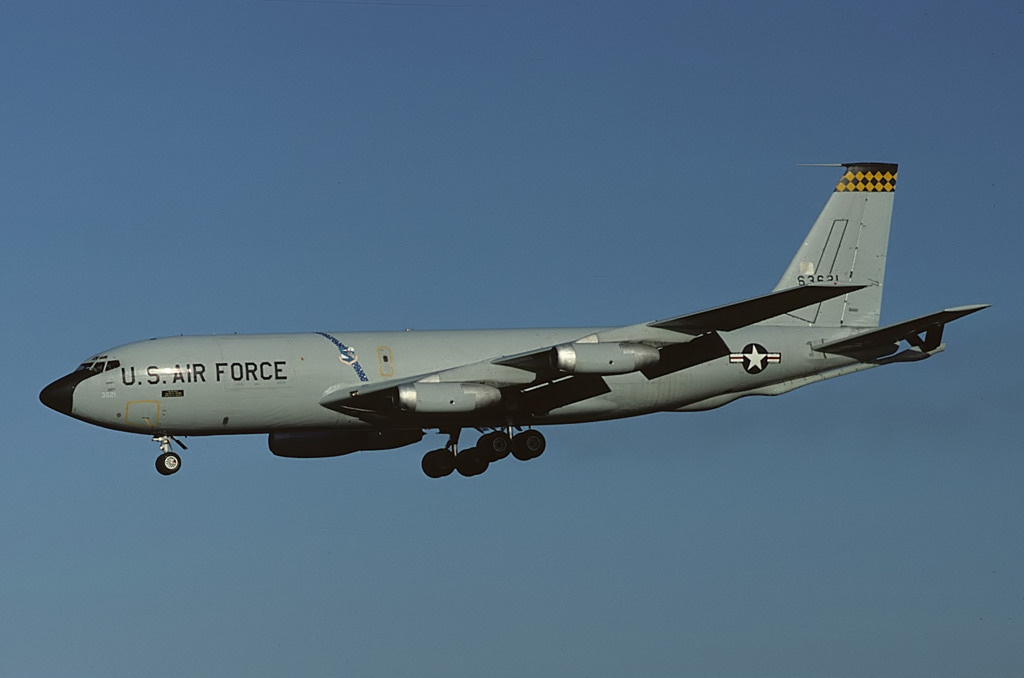
- 19th Air Refueling Wing KC-135A Stratotanker
- Active: 1943–1946; 1947–1951; 1994–1996; 2008
- Country: United States
- Branch: United States Air Force
- Role: Air refueling
- Part of: United States Air Forces Europe
- Motto(s): Anytime – Anyplace
- Engagements: European Theater of Operations

Insignia
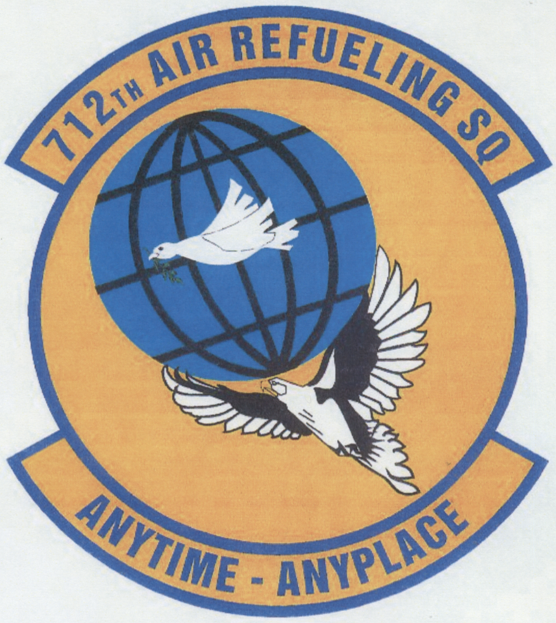
- 712th Air Refueling Squadron emblem (Note: Approved 8 June 1995. Description: Or, an eagle volant in base Argent beaked of the first [color mentioned] supporting between its wings a globe bendwise Celeste gridlined black and charged with a dove White grasping an olive branch in its beak Proper all within a diminished bordure Azure)

- 712th Bombardment Squadron emblem
- World War II fuselage code: CT

The 712th Expeditionary Air Refueling Squadron is a provisional United States Air Force unit. In February 2001, the squadron was converted to provisional status and assigned to United States Air Forces Europe to activate or inactivate as needed. It was activated in 2008 for exercises with the Hungarian Air Force.

The squadron was first activated as the 712th Bombardment Squadron during World War II. After training in the United States, it deployed to the European Theater of Operations, and served in the strategic bombing campaign against Germany with the 448th Bombardment Group. After V-E Day, the squadron returned to the United States, where it converted to the Boeing B-29 Superfortress. It was inactivated in August 1946 and replaced by another unit. It was active in the reserve from 1947 until 1951, when it was mobilized for the Korean War and inactivated after its personnel were used to man other units.

It was redesignated the 712th Air Refueling Squadron and served with the 19th Operations Group at Robins Air Force Base, Georgia from 1994 to 1996. Reactivated briefly between 14 March and 30 April 2008 at the Budapest Ferihengy International Airport and assigned to 398th Air Expeditionary Group in support of Operation Noble Endeavor ahead of the Bucharest NATO summit.

== History ==
=== World War II ===
Media related to 448th Bombardment Group (United States Army Air Forces) at Wikimedia Commons

==== Training in the United States ====
The squadron was first activated on 1 May 1943 at Gowen Field, Idaho as one of the original four squadrons of the 448th Bombardment Group. After completing initial training with Consolidated B-24 Liberators, it moved to Wendover Field, Utah for Phase 2 training, and to Sioux City Army Air Base, Iowa for final training. The ground echelon moved to Camp Shanks, New York and sailed for England aboard the RMS Queen Elizabeth on 23 November. The air echelon completed final processing at Herington Army Air Field, Kansas and deployed with their Liberators via the southern ferry route.

==== Combat in Europe ====
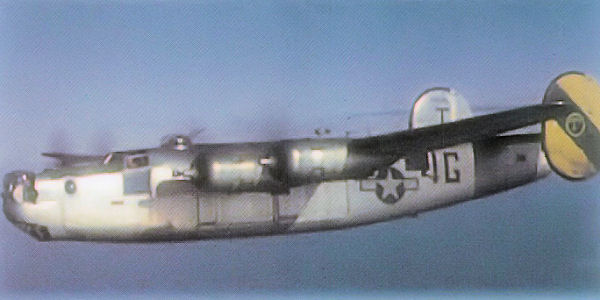
448th Bombardment Group B-24

The squadron flew its first combat mission from RAF Seething on 22 December 1943. It was primarily engaged in the strategic bombing campaign against Germany, attacking ball bearing plants in Berlin, marshalling yards at Cologne, a V-1 flying bomb assembly plant at Fallersleben, aircraft factories in Gotha, an airfield at Hanau, a chemical plant at Ludwigshafen, synthetic oil refineries near Pölitz, aircraft engine plants at Rostock, among other strategic targets. The squadron participated in Big Week, an intensive campaign against German aircraft manufacturing plants from 20 to 25 February 1944.

The squadron was occasionally diverted from its strategic bombing mission to fly interdiction and close air support missions. It bombed V- weapon launch sites, airfields and transportation facilities to support Operation Overlord, the invasion of Normandy, and on D-Day attacked coastal defenses and choke points on German lines of communication. It struck enemy positions to assist the allied attacks on Caen and Operation Cobra, the breakout at Saint Lo. It dropped supplies to allied troops during Operation Market Garden, the attempt to seize a bridgehead across the Rhine in the Netherlands. During the Battle of the Bulge, it attacked transportation and communications targets in December 1944 and January 1945. In the spring of 1945, it again dropped supplies to airborne troops in Operation Varsity, the airborne assault across the Rhine near Wesel. The squadron flew its last combat mission on 25 April 1945, an attack on a railroad yard near Salzburg, Austria.

The air echelon began returning to the United States with their planes in June 1945, while the ground echelon sailed from Greenock on the RMS Queen Mary on 6 July. Squadron members were given leave upon arrival in the States and the squadron began to assemble at Sioux Falls Army Air Field, South Dakota in the middle of the month. After training with the Boeing B-29 Superfortress, the squadron moved to Fort Worth Army Air Field, Texas in December 1945. At Fort Worth, it became one of the first units of Strategic Air Command in March 1946. However, in August the squadron was inactivated and its personnel and equipment were transferred to the 325th Bombardment Squadron, which was simultaneously activated.

=== Air Force reserve ===
The squadron was reactivated as a reserve unit under Air Defense Command (ADC) at Long Beach Army Air Field, California in April 1947, where its training was supervised by the 416th AAF Base Unit (later the 2347th Air Force Reserve Training Center). Although nominally a B-29 unit, it is not clear whether or not the squadron was fully staffed or equipped. In 1948 Continental Air Command (ConAC) assumed responsibility for managing reserve and Air National Guard units from ADC. In June 1949nAC reorganized its reserve units under the wing base organization, and the squadron became a Douglas B-26 Invader unit of the 448th Bombardment Wing. However, it was staffed at 25% of normal strength.

In August 1950, the 448th Wing's companion reserve unit at Long Beach, the 452d Bombardment Wing, was mobilized for Korean War service. In order to bring the 452d Wing to combat strength, skilled reservists and reservists who required 60 or fewer days training to qualify them as fully skilled assigned to the 448th Wing were transferred to the 452d Wing. The 712th Squadron itself was called to active duty in the second wave of mobilization in March 1951 and its personnel who had not been transferred to the 452d Wing were used as fillers for other Air Force organizations, while the squadron was inactivated four days later.

=== Air refueling operations ===
The squadron was redesignated the 712th Air Refueling Squadron and activated in April 1994 at Robins Air Force Base, Georgia as a Boeing KC-135 Stratotanker tanker squadron. The squadron assumed the mission, personnel and equipment of the 912th Air Refueling Squadron, which moved on paper from Robins to Grand Forks Air Force Base, Kansas, as the 19th Air Refueling Wing's second air refueling squadron. In July 1996, the 19th Wing was inactivated when the refueling activity at Robins was reduced to group size and the squadron was also inactivated.

The squadron was converted to a provisional unit as the 712th Expeditionary Air Refueling Squadron in February 2001, and assigned to United States Air Forces in Europe to activate or inactivate as needed. It was activated in March 2008 at Budapest Ferihengy International Airport Hungary and inactivated at the end of the following month. While on this deployment, it supported the Romanian-led Operation Noble Endeavor which had the task of providing air policing during the 2008 Bucharest summit. Maintenance of the aircraft was provided by airmen of the 100th Air Refueling Wing from RAF Mildenhall.

== Lineage ==
- Constituted as the 712th Bombardment Squadron (Heavy) on 6 April 1943

Activated on 1 May 1943
Redesignated 712th Bombardment Squadron, Heavy on 20 August 1943
Redesignated 712th Bombardment Squadron, Very Heavy on 5 August 1945
Inactivated on 4 August 1946

- Activated in the reserve on 19 April 1947

Redesignated 712th Bombardment Squadron, Light on 27 June 1949
Ordered to active service on 17 March 1951
Inactivated 21 March 1951

- Redesignated 712th Air Refueling Squadron and activated, on 1 April 1994

Inactivated on 1 July 1996

- Converted to provisional status and redesignated 712th Expeditionary Air Refueling Squadron on 5 February 2001

Activated on 18 March 2008
Inactivated on 30 April 2008

=== Assignments ===
- 448th Bombardment Group, 1 May 1943 – 4 August 1946
- 448th Bombardment Group, 19 April 1947 – 21 March 1951
- 19th Operations Group, 1 April 1994 – 1 July 1996
- United States Air Forces in Europe to activate or inactivate as needed, 5 February 2002

398th Air Expeditionary Group, 14 March–30 April 2008

=== Stations ===
- Gowen Field, Idaho, 1 May 1943
- Wendover Field, Utah, 4 July 1943
- Sioux City Army Air Base, Iowa, 11 September-7 November 1943
- RAF Seething (AAF-146), England, 25 November 1943 – 5 July 1945
- Sioux Falls Army Air Field, South Dakota, 15 July 1945
- McCook Army Air Field, Nebraska, 25 July 1945
- Biggs Field, Texas, 23 August 1945
- McCook Army Air Field, Nebraska, 8 September 1945
- Fort Worth Army Air Field, Texas, 15 December 1945 – 4 August 1946
- Long Beach Army Air Field (later Long Beach Municipal Airport), California, 19 April 1947 – 21 March 1951
- Robins Air Force Base, Georgia, 1 April 1994 – 1 July 1996
- Budapest Ferihengy International Airport, Hungary, 14 March–30 April 2008

=== Aircraft ===
- Consolidated B-24 Liberator, 1943–1945
- Boeing B-29 Superfortress, 1945–1946
- Boeing KC-135 Stratotanker, 1994–1996
