= 715th Weapons Squadron =

Inactive United States Air Force unit

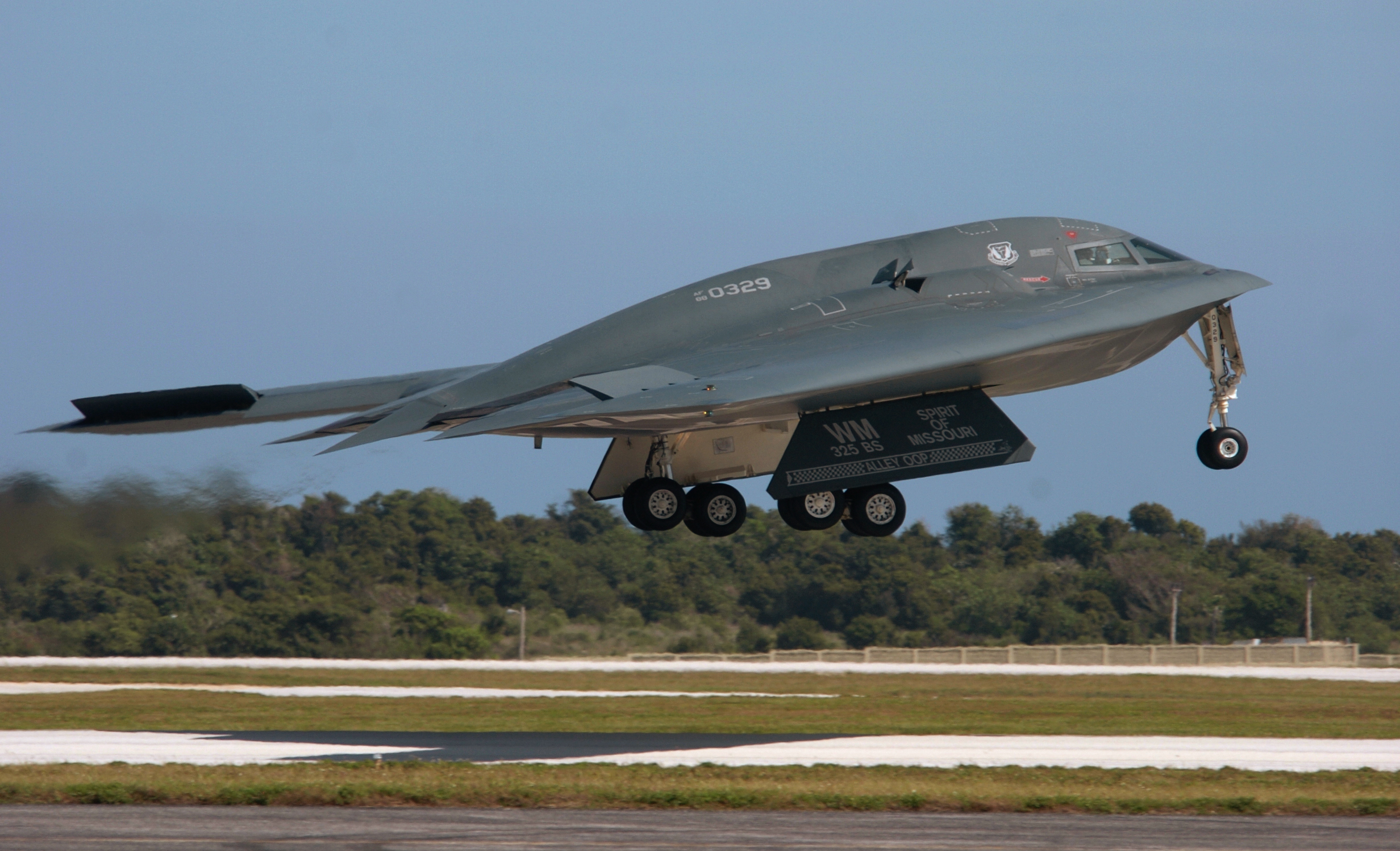
- B-2 Spirit taking off from Andersen AFB (Note: Aircraft is Northrop B-2A Block 10 Spirit, serial 88-0329, Spirit of Missouri. This was the first B-2A delivered to the Air Force. It was upgraded to Block 30 in 1997. Baugher, Joe (21 May 2023). "1988 USAF Serial Numbers". Joe Baugher.)
- Active: 1943-1966; 1970-1990; 2003-2005
- Country: United States
- Branch: United States Air Force
- Type: Squadron
- Role: Advanced bombardment training
- Mottos: Defensor Vindex (Latin for 'Defender, Avenger') (Note: Maurer translates this as "Defender of Liberty" [sic]. Maurer, Combat Squadrons, p. 715.)
- Engagements: World War II (EAME Theater)
- Decorations: Air Force Outstanding Unit Award

Insignia
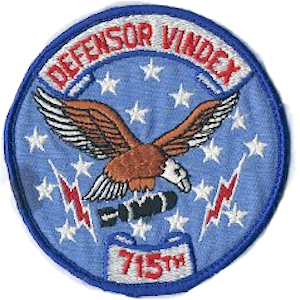
- Patch with 715th Weapons Squadron emblem (Note: Approved 6 June 1956. Description: On a sky blue disc spattered with fifteen white stars and bordered deep blue, an American bald eagle in natural colors, in flight, his wings extending beyond the disc, carrying in his talons a bomb gray with black tail fins flanked with two red lightning flashes edged. white.)

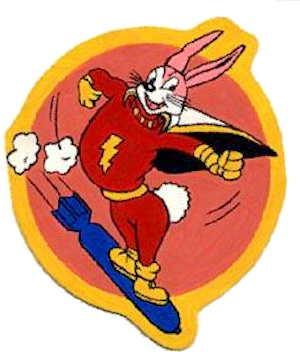
- 715th Bombardment Squadron emblem (World War II)

The 715th Weapons Squadron is an inactive United States Air Force unit. It was last assigned to the USAF Weapons School at Whiteman Air Force Base, Missouri, where it served from 2003 until 9 September 2005 as an advanced training unit with the Northrop Grumman B-2 Spirit.

The squadron was first activated as the 715th Bombardment Squadron during World War II. After training in the United States, it deployed to the European Theater of Operations, and served in the strategic bombing campaign against Germany with the 448th Bombardment Group. After V-E Day, the squadron returned to the United States, where it converted to the Boeing B-29 Superfortress. In 1946, it became part of Strategic Air Command (SAC) and served as a bomber unit with SAC until inactivating in 1966, when its parent 509th Bombardment Wing converted to the Boeing B-52 Stratofortress. It was activated again in 1970, and served again with SAC, flying the General Dynamics FB-111 until inactivating again in 1990.

== History ==
=== World War II ===
==== Training in the United States ====
The squadron was first activated on 1 May 1943 at Gowen Field, Idaho as one of the original four squadrons of the 448th Bombardment Group. After completing initial training with Consolidated B-24 Liberators, it moved to Wendover Field, Utah for Phase 2 training, and to Sioux City Army Air Base, Iowa for final training. The ground echelon moved to Camp Shanks, New York and sailed for England aboard the RMS Queen Elizabeth on 23 November. The air echelon completed final processing at Herington Army Air Field, Kansas and deployed with their Liberators via the southern ferry route.

==== Combat in Europe ====
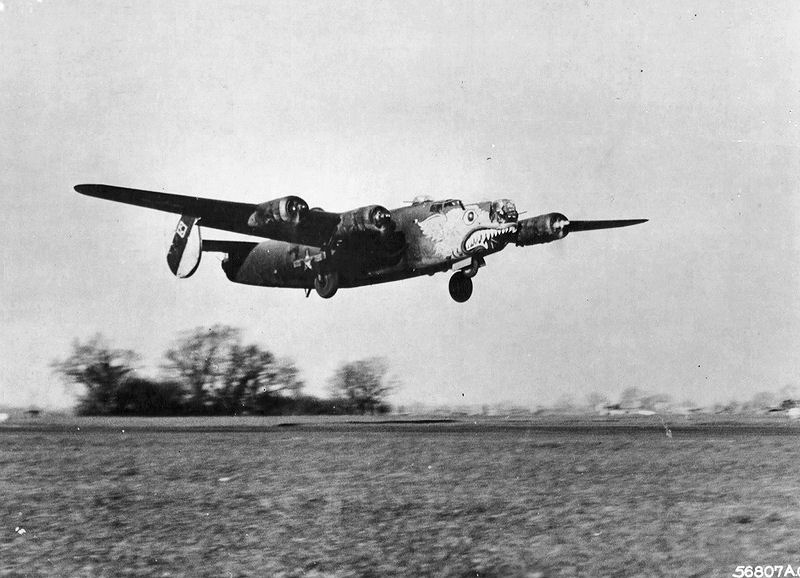
715th Bomb Squadron B-24H coming in for a landing at RAF Seething (Note: Aircraft is Ford-built Consolidated B-24H-20-FO Liberator, serial 42-94953, Rugged but Right. The photo was taken 30 March 1945.)

The squadron flew its first combat mission from RAF Seething on 22 December 1943. it was primarily engaged in the strategic bombing campaign against Germany, attacking ball bearing plants in Berlin, marshalling yards at Cologne, a V-1 flying bomb assembly plant at Fallersleben, aircraft factories in Gotha, an airfield at Hanau, a chemical plant at Ludwigshafen, synthetic oil refineries near Pölitz, aircraft engine plants at Rostock, among other strategic targets. The squadron participated in Big Week, an intensive campaign against German aircraft manufacturing plants from 20 to 25 February 1944.

The squadron was occasionally diverted from its strategic bombing mission to fly interdiction and close air support missions. It bombed V-weapon launch sites, airfields and transportation facilities to support Operation Overlord, the invasion of Normandy, and on D-Day attacked coastal defenses and choke points on German lines of communication. It struck enemy positions to assist the allied attacks on Caen and Operation Cobra, the breakout at Saint Lo. It dropped supplies to allied troops during Operation Market Garden, the attempt to seize a bridgehead across the Rhine in the Netherlands. During the Battle of the Bulge, it attacked transportation and communications targets in December 1944 and January 1945. In the spring of 1945, it again dropped supplies to airborne troops in Operation Varsity, the airborne assault across the Rhine near Wesel. The squadron flew its last combat mission on 25 April 1945, an attack on a railroad yard near Salzburg, Austria.

The air echelon began returning to the United States with their planes in June 1945, while the ground echelon sailed from Greenock on the RMS Queen Mary on 6 July. Squadron members were given leave upon arrival in the States and the squadron began to assemble at Sioux Falls Army Air Field, South Dakota in the middle of the month. After training with the Boeing B-29 Superfortress, the squadron moved to Fort Worth Army Air Field, Texas in December 1945. At Fort Worth, it became one of the first units of Strategic Air Command in March 1946.

=== Strategic Air Command ===
Very heavy bombardment groups of the Army Air Forces were organized with three squadrons, rather than the four squadrons of other bomber units. The 715th was the fourth squadron of the 448th Group and in May 1946, it was reassigned to the 509th Composite Group, which was reorganizing as a bombardment group. The following month, it moved to Roswell Army Air Field, New Mexico, to join the 509th. Its B-29s were modified as the atomic-capable Silverplate configuration. The squadron began upgrading to the Boeing B-50 Superfortress, an advanced version of the B-29 in 1950. The B-50 gave the unit the capability to carry heavy loads of conventional weapons faster and farther as well as being designed for atomic bomb missions if necessary. The squadron deployed to SAC airfields in England, and also to Andersen Air Force Base, Guam on long-term deployments in the 1950s.

By 1951, the emergence of the Soviet Mikoyan-Gurevich MiG-15 interceptor in the skies of North Korea signaled the end of the propeller-driven B-50 as a first-line strategic bomber. The squadron moved into the jet age when it received new, swept wing Boeing B-47 Stratojets in 1955 which were designed to carry nuclear weapons and to penetrate Soviet air defenses with its high operational ceiling and near supersonic speed. The squadron flew the B-47 for about a decade when by the mid-1960s it had become obsolescent and vulnerable to new Soviet air defenses. The squadron began to send its Stratojets to the Aerospace Maintenance and Regeneration Center at Davis-Monthan Air Force Base, Arizona for retirement in 1965, and the unit inactivated in 1966.

The squadron reactivated as a General Dynamics FB-111A Aardvark strategic bomber squadron in 1970 when aircraft became part of SAC's nuclear deterrent force. It was inactivated in 1990 with retirement of that weapons system.

=== Air Combat Command weapons squadron ===
The Air Force Chief of Staff directed the creation of the B-2 Division, USAF Weapons School in May 2002. On 13 August 2003, the B-2 Division was replaced by the squadron, now designated the 715th Weapons Squadron and activated at Whiteman Air Force Base, Missouri as an advanced instructional unit. The 715th was separated from its headquarters, the 57th Wing, stationed at Nellis Air Force Base, Nevada. It was inactivated, and its assets transferred to the 325th Weapons Squadron on 9 September 2005.

== Lineage ==
- Constituted as the 715th Bombardment Squadron (Heavy) on 6 April 1943

Activated on 1 May 1943
Redesignated 715th Bombardment Squadron, Heavy on 20 August 1943
Redesignated 715th Bombardment Squadron, Very Heavy on 5 August 1945
Redesignated 715th Bombardment Squadron, Medium on 2 July 1948
Discontinued and inactivated on 25 June 1966
Activated on 1 January 1970
Inactivated on 30 September 1990
Redesignated 715th Weapons Squadron on 11 August 2003
Activated on 13 August 2003
Inactivated on 9 September 2005

=== Assignments ===
- 448th Bombardment Group, 1 May 1943
- 509th Composite Group (later 509 Bombardment Group), 6 May 1946 (attached to 509th Bombardment Wing, 17 November 1947 – 14 September 1948 and after 1 February 1951)
- 509th Bombardment Wing, 16 June 1952 – 25 June 1966
- 509th Bombardment Wing, 1 January 1970 – 30 September 1990
- USAF Weapons School, 13 August 2003 – 9 September 2005

=== Stations ===
- Gowen Field, Idaho, 1 May 1943
- Wendover Field, Utah, 4 July 1943
- Sioux City Army Air Base, Iowa, 11 September-7 November 1943
- RAF Seething (AAF-146), England, 25 November 1943 – 5 July 1945
- Sioux Falls Army Air Field, South Dakota, 15 July 1945
- McCook Army Air Field, Nebraska, 25 July 1945
- Biggs Field, Texas, 23 August 1945
- McCook Army Air Field, Nebraska, 8 September 1945
- Fort Worth Army Air Field, Texas, 12 December 1945
- Roswell Army Air Field (later Walker Air Force Base), New Mexico, 26 June 1946
- Pease Air Force Base, New Hampshire, 1 July 1958 – 25 June 1966
- Pease Air Force Base, New Hampshire, 1 January 1970 – 30 September 1990
- Whiteman Air Force Base, Missouri, 13 August 2003 – 9 September 2005

=== Aircraft ===
- Consolidated B-24 Liberator, 1943–1945
- Boeing B-29 Superfortress, 1945–1951
- Boeing B-50 Superfortress, 1950–1955
- Boeing B-47 Stratojet, 1955–1965
- General Dynamics FB-111A Aardvark, 1971-1990
- Northrop Grumman B-2 Spirit, 2003-2005
