= 448th =

448th may refer to:

- 448th (Northumbrian) Field Company, Royal Engineers, in the 1st Newcastle Engineers in the British Territorial Army
- 448th Fighter Squadron, inactive United States Air Force unit
- 448th Missile Squadron, inactive United States Air Force unit
- 448th Rocket Brigade, Tactical ballistic missile brigade of the Russian Ground Forces
- 448th Supply Chain Management Group, inactive United States Air Force unit
- 448th Supply Chain Management Wing, a wing of the Air Force Sustainment Center of Air Force Materiel Command

== See also ==
- 448 (number)
- 448, the year 448 (CDXLVIII) of the Julian calendar
- 448 BC
