= Andrew Ross (rugby union, born 1879) =

Scotland international rugby union player

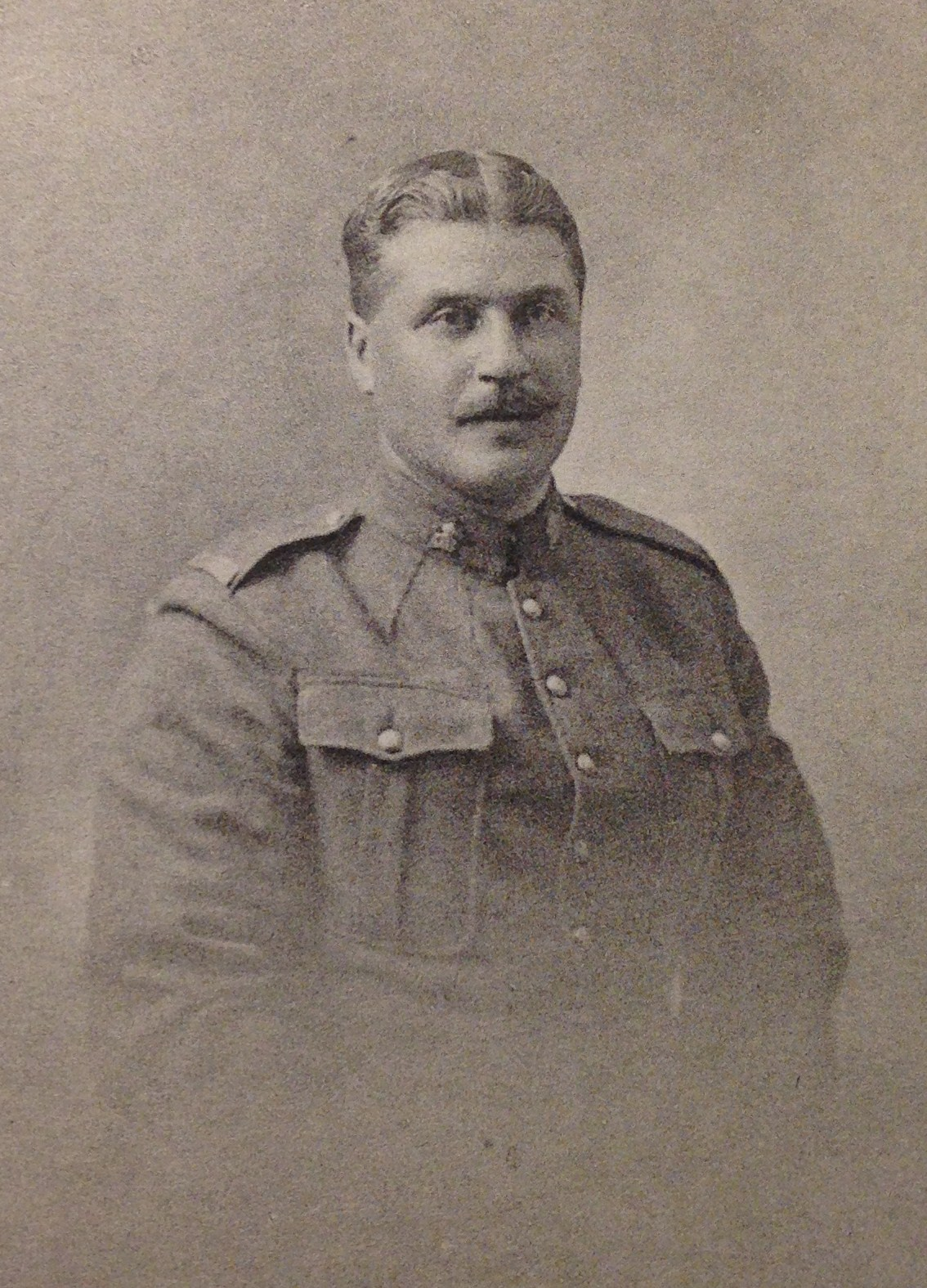
- Born: 15 May 1879 Edinburgh, Scotland
- Died: 6 April 1916 (aged 36) St. Eloi Craters, St Eloi, Belgium
- Height: 5 ft 10 in (1.78 m)
- Weight: 14 st 4 lb (91 kg)
- School: Royal High School, Edinburgh
- Occupation: Marine engineer

Rugby union career
- Position: Forward
Amateur team(s)
Years	Team	Apps	(Points)
- Royal HSFP
Provincial / State sides
Years	Team	Apps	(Points)
1899-1904	Edinburgh District		
1905	Cities District		
International career
Years	Team	Apps	(Points)
1905, 1909	Scotland	5	(0)
- Military career
- Burial place: Ridge Wood Military Cemetery, Belgium
- Allegiance: United Kingdom
- Branch: Canadian Expeditionary Force
- Service years: 1914–1916
- Rank: Private (Note: Sewell (1919, p. 165) says that Ross was a sergeant, but his Grave Registration Report shows him as a private.)
- Unit: "Tobin's Tigers"
- Conflicts: First World War: Western Front; Ypres Salient actions; Battle of St. Eloi Craters †

Pte. Andrew Ross (15 May 1879 – 6 April 1916) was a Scottish rugby union player from Edinburgh. He worked in the Merchant Navy as a marine engineer. He played for Royal High School FP and was capped several times for Scotland between 1905 and 1909.

In 1910, Ross moved to Vancouver and enlisted with the Canadian Expeditionary Force after the First World War broke out, and was sent to Belgium with the 29th Canadians (Tobin's Tigers). Wounded during the Actions of St Eloi Craters, Ross risked his life to aid other wounded men under heavy fire when he was hit by a shell and killed. He is buried in Ridge Wood Military Cemetery, Belgium.

== Early life ==
Andrew Ross was born in Newington, Edinburgh, the oldest surviving son of solicitor Andrew Monro Ross, the Ross Herald, and his wife, William Frances Ross (née Gillon). He had seven siblings. He attended the Royal High School, Edinburgh, where he proved to be an all-round athlete, and an excellent swimmer.

Aged sixteen, he was apprenticed on the Glenfyne, sailing from Dundee, round Cape Horn, to Iquique. After returning to school for a year, he was apprenticed to a firm of engineers. He was also a keen oarsman, rowing with the East of Scotland Rowing Club of Leith.

== Rugby Union career ==
=== Amateur career ===
After leaving school, he played for the Royal High School former pupils team, gaining a reputation as a fast and courageous forward.

=== Provincial career ===
He earned selection for Edinburgh, and on 2 December 1899 played in the Inter City game against Glasgow: it was the first time in ten years that Edinburgh beat Glasgow.

Ross's career as a marine engineer took him overseas, but returning home in 1904, he played again for Edinburgh, beating Glasgow 6–3. Following this match, he was selected for the Cities District team to play against the Rest on 14 January 1905.

=== International career ===
His performance earned him selection for Scotland in the Home Nations fixture against Wales at Inverleith on 4 February 1905. Ahead of the game, the press was divided on which side would win, with the Scots having the home advantage and the better forwards, and the absence of Wales's Dick Jones at half back was seen as detrimental. Yet it was reckoned that if the Welsh backs got sufficient ball, they would be too clever for Scotland. The weather would also play a crucial role. For his part, Ross was expected to make "strong impressions in more than one sense". Before the game, the Evening Express said of him:

Andrew Ross has a particular bulldog style of play, and is known among his opponents as "Hackenschmidt". This is his first honour, and it is pretty certain that some of the Welshmen will feel sore before the game is through.

In the event, the weather was fine and favoured Wales, which beat the home team 3–6, in front of 20,000 spectators. The Scottish forwards "looked a fine, powerful lot", with their average estimated to be 10 lbs greater than the Welsh. The Scots scored first, through Little, but the Welsh captain, Willie Llewellyn, evened the scores before half time, and sealed the Welsh victory with a second try in the second half.

Ross was kept on for the rest of the championship, playing against Ireland on 25 February, and England on 18 March. Against England, he broke his ribs early in the game but played on to the end.

Returning once again to Scotland in 1909, Ross was recalled to the Scottish XV, playing against Wales on 6 February, and against Ireland on 27 February. Having lost to Wales at home for only the second time in 1905, Scotland repeated the defeat in 1909, losing 3–5 (a penalty to a converted try), in a game that was noted chiefly for poor refereeing.

==== International appearances ====
Opposition	Score	Result	Date	Venue	Ref(s)
Wales	3–6	Lost	4 February 1905	Inverleith	
Ireland	5–11	Lost	25 February 1905	Inverleith	
England	0–8	Won	18 March 1905	Richmond	
Wales	3–5	Lost	6 February 1909	Inverleith	
Ireland	9–3	Won	27 February 1909	Inverleith	

== Military career ==
Ross emigrated to Vancouver, British Columbia, Canada in 1910, where he was working as a marine engineer. At the outbreak of the First World War, Ross was working near the Arctic Circle. He travelled back to Vancouver from Albert Bay, arriving on 14 November 1914. Two weeks later, according to his correspondence, he was in training with the Second Canadian Division, having joined the 29th Battalion (Vancouver), of the Canadian Expeditionary Force: the battalion was nicknamed "Tobin's Tigers" after Lt.-Col. Henry Seymour Tobin, who began recruiting on 14 October 1914. The 29th Canadians embarked for Britain on 20 May 1915, arriving in Devonport in June 1915. After a visit home, Ross joined camp on 30 July. He competed shortly after in the regimental sports at Stamford Bridge, London, before departing for the Western Front, reaching France on 17 September.

The normal practice for a division arriving in France was for it to be kept in reserve, for further training in trench warfare, but the 2nd Canadian Division was sent almost immediately into the front line, under the newly formed Canadian Corps. On 28 September, Ross writes that their line is 30 to 250 yards from that of the Germans. He writes again on 23 November of a ruse to bring out the Germans from behind their defences:

We lit a fire in the trench and put plenty wet wood on it. That made a big smoke. Then two men made all the row they could, shouting at each other and hitting an empty biscuit tin with sticks. The result was, Fritz easily located the row by the column of smoke, and all the Fritzes within hearing peeped round their sandbags to have a look, and as everyone in our trench was on the lookout, it was the last look for most of them.

The role of the Canadians was to execute a policy of "wearing down" the enemy, and early on 31 January 1916, the 6th Brigade, including the 29th Battalion, staged a raid on the German position at the Spanbroekmolen salient. The 29th encountered little resistance, and it took them just four and a half minutes to capture three prisoners, bomb the dugouts and return to their own trenches. This action earned the battalion, and other units, recognition from Sir Douglas Haig in his first despatch for "good work in carrying out... local attacks and raids".

=== Action at St Eloi Craters ===
On 27 March 1916, following an artillery bombardment, combined with the detonation of mines beneath the German trenches, the British 5th Corps attacked the St Eloi salient. On the night of 3–4 April, the Canadian Corps relieved the British, with the 6th Canadian Brigade taking up positions in front of the craters created by the detonations.

The last letter from Ross is dated 4 April 1916. He reports: "there's lots of fighting where we are at present, and just now we are in the German trenches, so have a busy time... I'd like to see you all again..." For the next two days, the Canadian front line was under almost continuous bombardment. The 27th Battalion fared particularly badly, and on the night of 5–6 April, the 29th began relieving them, slowed down by the mud, extra equipment and a congestion of troops.

The corporal of Ross's section reported his death: "On the morning of 6 April we were serving together in the trenches. While attending devotedly and most courageously, under heavy artillery fire, to our wounded men, he was himself hit, and falling over a man he was dressing, died instantly. Quite reckless as regarding his own life, he exposed it, and gave it to save, as his quick attention undoubtedly did, the lives of a great number of our men." It transpired later that Ross was already wounded before he was himself killed.

Ross is buried at the Ridge Wood Military Cemetery (Grave IR9), West Flanders, Belgium.

== See also ==
- List of international rugby union players killed in action during the First World War
