= Hedenham =

Civil parish in Norfolk, England

Coordinates: 52.49021°N 1.40312°E

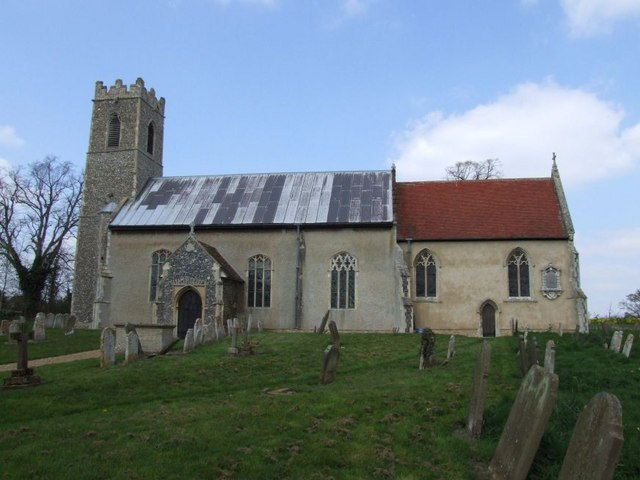
- St. Peter's Church, Hedenham

- Location within Norfolk
- Area: 3.88 sq mi (10.0 km^{2})
- Population: 237 (2021 census)
  - Density: 61/sq mi (24/km^{2})
- OS grid reference: TM311934
- Civil parish: Hedenham
- District: South Norfolk
- Shire county: Norfolk
- Region: East
- Country: England
- Sovereign state: United Kingdom
- Post town: BUNGAY
- Postcode district: NR35
- Dialling code: 01508
- UK Parliament: Waveney Valley

Hedenham is a village and civil parish in the English county of Norfolk.

Hedenham is located 4.7 miles (7.6 km) south-west of Loddon and 10 miles (16 km) south-east of Norwich.

== History ==
Hedenham's name is of Anglo-Saxon origin and derives from the Old English for the hamlet of Hedena.

In the Domesday Book of 1086, Hedenham is listed as a settlement of 34 households in the hundred of Lodding. In 1086, the village was part of the estates of Hugh d'Avranches, Earl of Chester.

Parts of the parish made up RAF Seething, which was used by the 448th Bombardment Group of the United States Army Air Forces during the Second World War.

== Geography ==
According to the 2021 census, Hedenham has a total population of 237 people which demonstrates a decrease from the 240 people listed in the 2011 census.

== St. Peter's Church ==
Hedenham's parish church is dedicated to Saint Peter and dates from the Fourteenth Century. St. Peter's is located within the village on Church Road and has been Grade I listed since 1987. The church holds Sunday service once a month and is part of the Earsham Benefice.

St. Peter's was restored in the Victorian era by Edward Tarver, who broke with the tradition of Victorian renovators by keeping most of the medieval memorials within the church. The church also features stained-glass installed by Samuel Yarrington and a set of royal arms from the reign of Queen Victoria.

== Governance ==
Hedenham is part of the electoral ward of Ditchingham & Earsham for local elections and is part of the district of South Norfolk.

The village's national constituency is Waveney Valley which has been represented by the Green Party's Adrian Ramsay MP since 2024.

== War Memorial ==
Hedenham's war memorial is a set of marble plaques inside St. Peter's Church which lists the following names for the First World War:

Rank	Name	Unit	Date of death	Burial/Commemoration
LCpl.	Ralph S. Fairhead	1st Bn., Norfolk Regiment	6 May 1915	Bailleul Cemetery
LCpl.	Herbert J. Riches	7th Bn., Norfolk Regt.	14 Oct. 1917	Arras Memorial
Pte.	Frederick G. Sampson	2nd Bn., Border Regiment	26 Oct. 1917	Tyne Cot
Pte.	Bernard Marshall (Note: Private Marshall enlisted in Victoria, British Columbia and has previously fought with the XIX Hussars.)	2nd Bn., Canadian Mounted Rifles	8 Oct. 1915	Ridge Wood Cemetery
Pte.	Edgar Riches	1st Bn., Essex Regiment	9 May 1917	St. Peter's Churchyard
Pte.	Edward W. Green	7th Bn., Norfolk Regiment	11 Aug. 1918	Glageon Cemetery

The following names were added after the Second World War:

Rank	Name	Unit	Date of death	Burial/Commemoration
PO	George R. Tart (Note: Pilot Officer Tart was lost after his Armstrong Whitley disappeared on an anti-submarine patrol.)	No. 10 Operational Training Unit	15 Oct. 1942	Runnymede Memorial
Gnr.	Sydney A. Wreford	65 A.T. Regt., Royal Artillery	1 Jun. 1940	Adinkerke Military Cemetery
Pte.	Percy W. Ainger	4th Bn., Royal Norfolk Regiment	11 Feb. 1941	Kranji War Memorial
