= RAF Seething =

Former RAF Station in Norfolk, England

RAF Seething USAAF Station 146
- Norwich, Norfolk in England
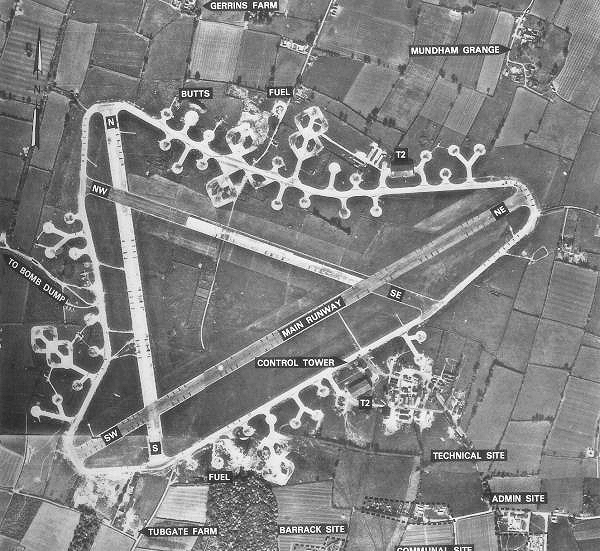
- Seething Airfield - 16 October 1945

Site information
- Type: Royal Air Force station
- Code: SE
- Owner: Air Ministry
- Operator: Royal Air Force; United States Army Air Forces
- Controlled by: Eighth Air Force

Location
- Shown within Norfolk
- Coordinates: 52.51°N 1.40°E

Site history
- Built: 1942
- Built by: John Laing & Sons
- In use: 1943-1945
- Battles/wars: European Theatre of World War II; Air Offensive, Europe July 1942 - May 1945

Garrison information
- Garrison: 448th Bombardment Group

Airfield information
Runways
Direction	Length and surface
00/00	6,000 feet (1,829 m) Concrete
00/00	4,200 feet (1,280 m) Concrete
00/00	4,200 feet (1,280 m) Concrete

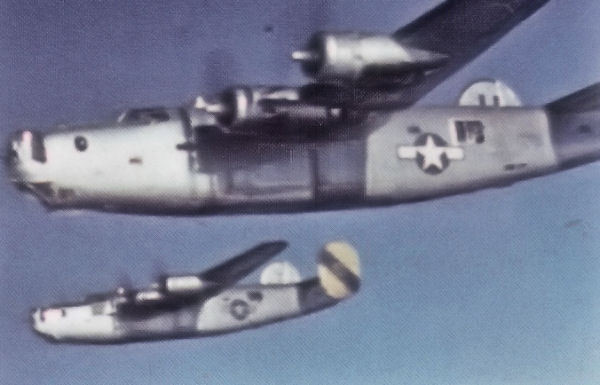
North American B-24J-1-NT Liberator 42-78491 "Egress U-Uncle" of the 713th Bomb Squadron (foreground). One of only three (of eight total) B-24s built by North American Aircraft to survive hostilities.

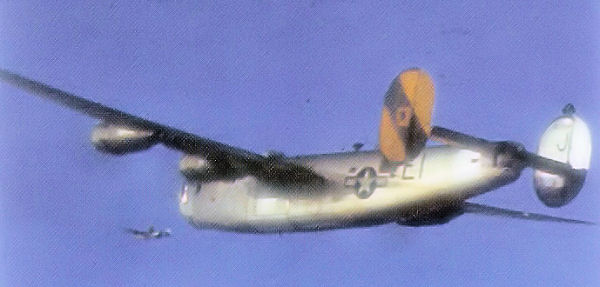
714th Bomb Squadron "Piccadilly Pat" Consolidated B-24J-401-CF Liberator 42-50470

Royal Air Force Seething, or more simply RAF Seething, is a former Royal Air Force station located around 10 miles (16 km) south-east of Norwich, Norfolk, England. The base was located on the parish boundaries of Seething, Mundham and Hedenham. The site is now the civilian Seething Airfield.

== History ==
Seething airfield was built in 1942−43 by John Laing & Son Ltd., to the standard Class A requirement for heavy bombers, the airfield had a main runway 6,000 ft. long aligned SW-NE and two secondary runways of 4,200 ft in length. The encircling perimeter track was three miles long. To meet United States Army Air Forces (USAAF) requirements, there were fifty-one hardstands both of the loop and frying-pan type and two T-2 hangars, placed one on each side of the airfield, that on the south being adjacent to the technical site. The camp was of temporary buildings and the sites dispersed in farmlands to the south of the airfield.

=== USAAF use ===
The airfield was assigned USAAF designation Station 146. Its ID Code was "SE".

==== 448th Bombardment Group (Heavy) ====
The airfield was opened on 1 December 1943 and was used by the United States Army Air Forces Eighth Air Force 448th Bombardment Group (Heavy). The 448th arrived from Sioux City AAF Iowa and was assigned to the 20th Combat Bombardment Wing. The group tail code was a "Circle-I". Its operational squadrons were:

- 712th Bombardment Squadron (CT)
- 713th Bombardment Squadron (IG)
- 714th Bombardment Squadron (EI)
- 715th Bombardment Squadron (IO)

The 448th flew Consolidated B-24 Liberators as part of the Eighth Air Force's strategic bombing campaign. The group entered combat on 22 December 1943, and until April 1945 served primarily as a strategic bombardment organization, hitting such targets as aircraft factories in Gotha, ball-bearing plants in Berlin, an airfield at Hanau, U-boat facilities at Kiel, a chemical plant at Ludwigshafen, synthetic oil refineries at Pölitz, aircraft engine plants at Rostock, marshalling yards at Cologne, and a V-1 flying bomb assembly plant at Fallersleben. The group took part in the intensive campaign of heavy bombers against the German aircraft industry during Big Week, 20–25 February 1944.

In addition to strategic operations, flew interdictory and support missions. Bombed V-weapon sites, airfields, and transportation facilities prior to the Normandy invasion in June 1944, and on D-Day attacked coastal defenses and choke points. Struck enemy positions to assist the Allied offensive at Caen and the breakthrough at Saint-Lô in July. Dropped supplies to airborne troops near Nijmegen during the airborne attack on the Netherlands in September. Bombed transportation and communications centers in the combat zone during the Battle of the Bulge, December 1944 – January 1945. Dropped supplies to troops at Wesel during the airborne assault across the Rhine in March 1945.

The group flew its last combat mission on 25 April, attacking a marshalling yard at Salzburg. It returned to Sioux Falls AAF South Dakota the US in July 1945.

After the war, the airfield was used by Royal Air Force units:

- No. 53 Maintenance Unit RAF
- No. 94 Maintenance Unit RAF

The airfield was closed in 1945.

== Current use ==
With the end of military control, most of the airfield was reverted to farming. The eastern section, including part of the main runway and a section of perimeter track, is now Seething Airfield which is home to the Waveney Flying Group. They have built three hangars and a clubroom and the airfield is active most days of the week.

To the south of the airfield, on some of the former dispersed barrack and communal sites, several of the old living quarters and associated buildings are still in existence. Some of these buildings are in a reasonable condition, although they are derelict and overgrown.

The former control tower has been renovated and has become a memorial museum to the 448th B.G.https://448bombgroup.co.uk/ It contains a Group Roll of Honor and various artifacts and memorabilia. It is open to the public on the first Sunday of the month May to October, but can be inspected at other times by special request.

In front of the control tower, dedicated during a veterans' reunion in 1990, stands a memorial to the men of the 448th B.G. who were missing or killed in action during service at Seething.

Two other memorials were dedicated during a veterans' reunion in 1984. One is on the airfield itself near the Waveney F.G. club-house and consists of an engraved stone plaque and rose garden; another similar plaque is in the churchyard of Seething Parish Church, which is a mile or so north of the airfield. The "Stars and Stripes" hang in the church itself while an oak sapling has been planted near the village hall to commemorate the Group's close association with the village.

== See also ==
- https://448bombgroup.co.uk/
- Stories of the 448th – Stories of those whose paths crossed the threshold of Seething Airfield
