= Hedenham Wood =

UK Site of Special Scientific Interest

Coordinates: 52.499°N 1.406°E

- Site of Special Scientific Interest
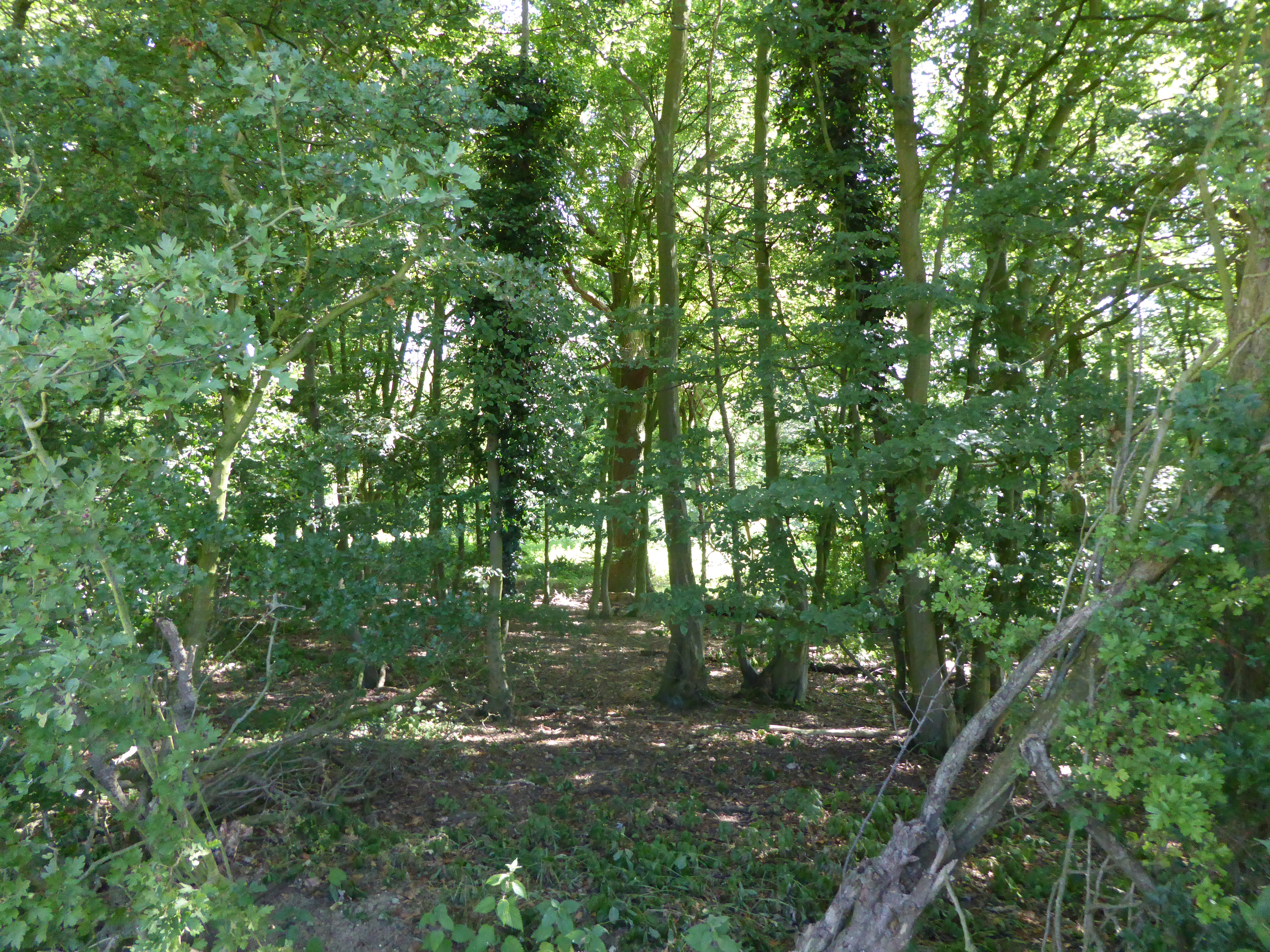
- Location of Hedenham Wood.
- Area of search: Norfolk
- Grid reference: TM 313 945
- Interest: Biological
- Area: 23.4 hectares (58 acres)
- Notification date: 1988
- Location map: Magic Map

Hedenham Wood is a 23.4-hectare (58-acre) biological Site of Special Scientific Interest north of Hedenham in Norfolk, England.

Most of the ancient wood on boulder clay is hornbeam coppice with oak standards, but the wet valley bottom has ash, maple and elm. The diverse ground flora includes some uncommon species.

The site is private with no public access.
