= 448th Supply Chain Management Group =

Inactive US Air Force unit

448th Supply Chain Management Group (formerly 448th Bombardment Group)
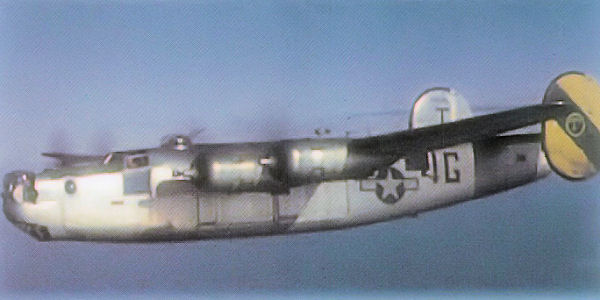
- 713th Bomb Squadron B-24H Liberator (Note: Aircraft is Ford built Consolidated B-24H-25-FO Liberator, serial 42-95185 "Do Bunny". This aircraft was shot down by a Me 262 on 25 March 1945 over Soltau, Germany.)
- Active: 1943–1946; 1947–1951; 1955–1957; 2005-2010
- Country: United States
- Branch: United States Air Force
- Role: logistics management
- Motto(s): "Destroy" (World War II)
- Engagements: European Theater of Operations

Insignia
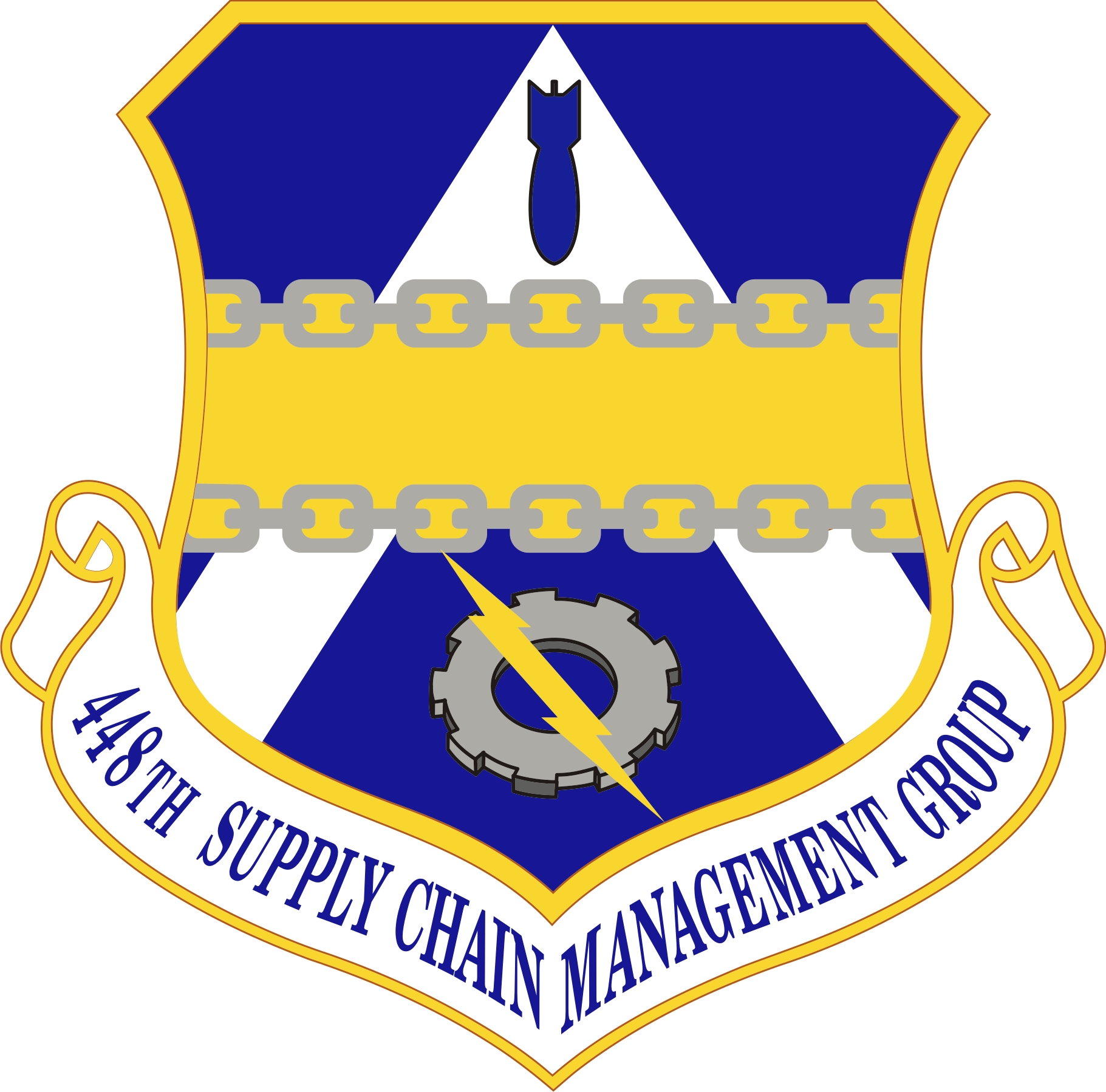
- 448th Supply Chain Management Group emblem (Note: While assigned to the 448th Wing, the group uses the wing emblem with the group designation on the scroll. AF Instruction 84-105, Organizational Lineage, Honors and History, 27 April 2017, paragraph 3.3.3)

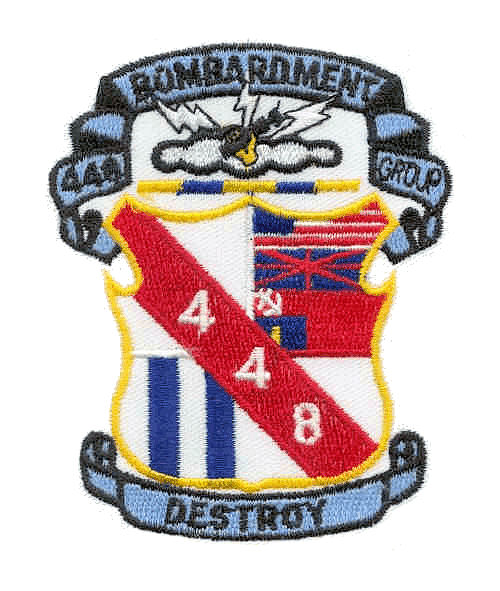
- 448th Bombardment Group emblem
- World War II Tail Marking (December 1943-May 1944): Circle I
- World War II Tail Marking (May 1944-June 1945): Yellow tail with black diagonal stripe

The 448th Supply Chain Management Group is an inactive United States Air Force unit. Its last assignment was to the 448th Supply Chain Management Wing at Tinker Air Force Base, Texas, where it was inactivated on 30 June 2010.

The group was first organized during World War II, as the 448th Bombardment Group. The group engaged in the strategic bombing campaign against Germany with Eighth Air Force, flying Consolidated B-24 Liberators from RAF Seething. The group flew its last combat mission on 25 April 1945, attacking a marshalling yard at Salzburg, Austria.

It returned to the United States in July 1945, and was assigned to Second Air Force for Boeing B-29 Superfortress conversion and training at McCook Army Air Field. It moved to Fort Worth Army Air Field, where it became one of the original ten B-29 bombardment groups assigned to Strategic Air Command. The group was inactivated on 4 August 1946 and its aircraft and personnel were reassigned another unit.

Reactivated in 1947 in the Air Force reserve, in 1949 it was reorganized as a light bomber group, It was mobilized in 1951 with its personnel and aircraft being used to bring other units up to full strength before inactivating. The group was again active in the reserve from 1955 to 1957 as the 448th Fighter-Bomber Group.

The group was redesignated the 448th Combat Sustainment Group and activated at Tinker Air Force Base, Oklahoma in 2006, but was inactivated as the 448th Combat Sustainment Group in 2010.

== History ==
=== World War II ===
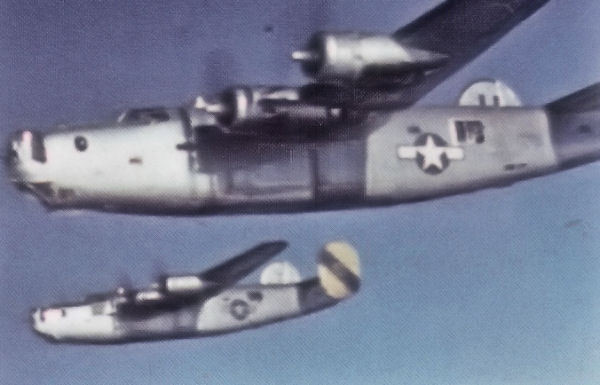
B-24J Liberator of the 713th Bomb Squadron (Note: Aircraft is North American built Consolidated B-24J-1-NT Liberator, serial 42-78491 "Egress U-Uncle" (foreground). One of only three (of eight total) B-24s built by North American Aviation to survive hostilities in World War II.)

==== Initial organization and training in the United States ====
The group was first activated as the 448th Bombardment Group on 1 May 1943 at Gowen Field, Idaho. Its original components were the 712th, 713th, 714th, and 715th Bombardment Squadrons After completing initial training with Consolidated B-24 Liberators, it moved to Wendover Field, Utah for Phase 2 training, and to Sioux City Army Air Base, Iowa for final training. The ground echelon moved to Camp Shanks, New York and sailed for England aboard the RMS Queen Elizabeth on 23 November. The air echelon completed final processing at Herington Army Air Field, Kansas and deployed with their Liberators via the southern ferry route.

==== Combat in Europe ====
The group was established at RAF Seething in early December 1943 and flew its first combat mission on 22 December 1943. it was primarily engaged in the strategic bombing campaign against Germany, attacking ball bearing plants in Berlin, marshalling yards at Cologne, a V-1 flying bomb assembly plant at Fallersleben, aircraft factories in Gotha, an airfield at Hanau, a chemical plant at Ludwigshafen, synthetic oil refineries near Pölitz, aircraft engine plants at Rostock, among other strategic targets. The squadron participated in Big Week, an intensive campaign against German aircraft manufacturing plants from 20 to 25 February 1944.

The squadron was occasionally diverted from its strategic bombing mission to fly interdiction and close air support missions. It bombed V-weapon launch sites, airfields and transportation facilities to support Operation Overlord, the invasion of Normandy, and on D-Day attacked coastal defenses and choke points on German lines of communication. It struck enemy positions to assist the allied attacks on Caen and Operation Cobra, the breakout at Saint Lo. It dropped supplies to allied troops during Operation Market Garden, the attempt to seize a bridgehead across the Rhine in the Netherlands. During the Battle of the Bulge, it attacked transportation and communications targets in December 1944 and January 1945. In the spring of 1945, it again dropped supplies to airborne troops in Operation Varsity, the airborne assault across the Rhine near Wesel. The squadron flew its last combat mission on 25 April 1945, an attack on a railroad yard near Salzburg, Austria. The group flew 262 combat missions, on which it lost 101 bombers, while claiming the destruction of 44 enemy fighters. Joseph C. McConnell the leading United States Air Force fighter ace during the Korean War, served as a navigator with the group.

=== Cold War ===
==== Strategic Air Command ====
The air echelon began returning to the United States with their planes in June 1945, while the ground echelon sailed from Greenock on the RMS Queen Mary on 6 July. Squadron members were given leave upon arrival in the States and the squadron began to assemble at Sioux Falls Army Air Field, South Dakota in the middle of the month. After training with the Boeing B-29 Superfortress, the squadron moved to Fort Worth Army Air Field, Texas in December 1945. At Fort Worth, it became one of the first units of Strategic Air Command in March 1946. Although B-29 groups were organized with three squadrons, the squadron maintained its four squadron strength until May 1946, when the 715th Bombardment Squadron transferred to the control of the 509th Composite Group and moved to join the 509th the following month. (Note: The 715th Squadron continued to be associated with the 509th through 2005.) However, in August the group was inactivated and its personnel and equipment were transferred to the 92nd Bombardment Group, which was simultaneously activated.

==== Air Force reserve ====
The group was reactivated as a reserve unit under Air Defense Command (ADC) at Long Beach Army Air Field, California in April 1947, where its training was supervised by the 416th AAF Base Unit (later the 2347th Air Force Reserve Training Center). Although nominally a B-29 unit, it is not clear whether or not the group was fully staffed or equipped. In 1948 Continental Air Command (ConAC) assumed responsibility for managing reserve and Air National Guard units from ADC. In June 1949 ConAC reorganized its reserve units under the wing base organization, and the group became a Douglas B-26 Invader unit of the 448th Bombardment Wing. It replaced its 41st Bombardment Squadron with the 711th Bombardment Squadron. However, its operational squadrons were staffed at 25% of normal strength.

In August 1950, the 448th Wing's companion reserve unit at Long Beach, the 452d Bombardment Wing, was mobilized for Korean War service. In order to bring the 452d Wing to combat strength, skilled reservists and reservists who required 60 or fewer days training to qualify them as fully skilled assigned to the 448th Wing were transferred to the 452d Wing. The group itself was called to active duty in the second wave of mobilization in March 1951 and its personnel who had not been transferred to the 452d Wing were used as fillers for other Air Force organizations, while the squadron was inactivated four days later.

The reserve mobilization for the Korean War left it without aircraft, and the reserve did not again receive aircraft until July 1952. When aircraft were assigned, six reserve pilot training wings were activated. However, the Air Force desired that all reserve units be designed to augment the regular forces in the event of a national emergency. Because the pilot training wings had no mobilization mission they were discontinued on 18 May 1955, and replaced by fighter-bomber and troop carrier wings. The group was redesignated the 448th Fighter-Bomber Group and again activated as a reserve unit at Hensley Field, Texas when the 448th Fighter-Bomber Wing replaced the 8709th Pilot Training Wing. The group took over the North American T-28 Trojan aircraft of the 8709th, but soon re-equipped with Lockheed F-80 Shooting Stars.

Despite its fighter bomber designation, the squadron was gained on mobilization by Air Defense Command upon mobilization. The group flew the F-80 until 1957, when it began converting to the North American F-86 Sabre.

However, the Joint Chiefs of Staff were pressuring the Air Force to provide more wartime airlift. At the same time, about 150 Fairchild C-119 Flying Boxcars became available from the active force. Consequently, in November 1956 the Air Force directed Continental Air Command to convert three reserve fighter bomber wings to the troop carrier mission by September 1957. In addition, within the Air Staff was a recommendation that the reserve fighter mission given to the Air National Guard and replaced by the troop carrier mission. As a consequence in November 1957, the 448th and the remainder of the 448th Wing were inactivated when reserve operations at Hensley converted to the airlift mission.

=== Logistics management ===
In 2005, Air Force Materiel Command (AFMC) implemented the AFMC Transformation project, which replaced the staff agencies at air logistics centers with wings, groups, and squadrons. The group was redesignated the 448th Eagle Propulsion Sustainment Group and activated at Tinker Air Force Base, Oklahoma on 18 February 2005. It was assigned three newly organized combat sustainment squadrons, the 540th, 541st, and 542nd. A little over a year later, AFMC removed the specific systems from the new groups' designations and the 448th became the 448th Combat Sustainment Group. In 2008, it became the 448th Supply Chain Management Group and its subordinate squadrons were inactivated. In 2010, AFMC returned some supply management functions to logistics complex staffs, and the group was inactivated.

== Lineage ==
- Constituted as the 448th Bombardment Group (Heavy) on 6 April 1943

Activated on 1 May 1943
Redesignated 448th Bombardment Group, Heavy on 20 August 1943
Redesignated 448th Bombardment Group, Very Heavy on 5 August 1945
Inactivated on 4 August 1946

- Activated in the reserve on 19 April 1947

Redesignated 448th Bombardment Group, Light on 27 June 1949
Ordered to active duty on 17 March 1951
Inactivated on 21 March 1951

- Redesignated 448th Fighter-Bomber Group on 12 April 1955

Activated on 18 May 1955
Inactivated on 16 November 1957
Redesignated 448th Tactical Fighter Group on 31 July 1985 (remained inactive)

- Redesignated 448th Eagle Propulsion Sustainment Group on 31 January 2005

Activated on 18 February 2005
Redesignated 448th Combat Sustainment Group on 14 April 2006
Redesignated 448th Supply Chain Management Group on 1 April 2008
Inactivated on 30 June 2010

=== Assignments ===
- II Bomber Command, 1 May 1943
- Second Air Force, 6 October 1943 – November 1943
- 20th Combat Bombardment Wing (later 20th Bombardment Wing), 30 November 1943
- 96th Bombardment Wing, 6 July 1945
- Second Air Force, 23 July 1945
- Fifteenth Air Force, 21 March – 4 August 1946
- 304th Bombardment Wing, 19 April 1947
- 448th Bombardment Wing, 27 June 1949 – 21 March 1951
- 448th Fighter-Bomber Wing, 18 May 1955 – 16 November 1957
- 448th Combat Sustainment Wing (later 448th Supply Chain Management Wing), 18 February 2005 – 30 June 2010

=== Components ===
- 41st Bombardment Squadron, 12 July 1947 – 27 June 1949
- 540th Combat Sustainment Squadron, 14 April 2006 – 28 April 2008
- 541st Combat Sustainment Squadron, 14 April 2006 – 28 April 2008
- 542d Combat Sustainment Squadron, 14 April 2006 – 28 April 2008
- 546th Combat Sustainment Squadron, 28 Sep 2007 – 28 April 2008
- 711th Bombardment Squadron (later 711th Fighter-Bomber Squadron): 27 June 1949 – 21 March 1951; 18 May 1955 – 16 November 1957
- 712th Bombardment Squadron: 1 May 1943 – 4 August 1946; 19 April 1947 – 21 March 1951
- 713th Bombardment Squadron (later 713th Fighter-Bomber Squadron): 1 May 1943 – 4 August 1946; 19 April 1947 – 21 March 1951; 18 May 1955 – 16 November 1957
- 714th Bombardment Squadron: 1 May 1943 – 4 August 1946; 19 April 1947 – 21 March 1951
- 715th Bombardment Squadron: 1 May 1943 – 6 May 1946

=== Stations ===
- Gowen Field, Idaho, 1 May 1943
- Wendover Field, Utah, c. 3 July 1943
- Sioux City Army Air Base, Iowa, c. 11 September – c. 7 November 1943
- RAF Seething (USAAF Station 146), England c. 1 December 1943 – c. July 1945
- Sioux Falls Army Air Field, South Dakota, c. 15 July 1945
- McCook Army Air Field, Nebraska, c. 8 September 1945
- Fort Worth Army Air Field, Texas, c. December 1945 – 4 August 1946
- Long Beach Army Air Base (later Long Beach Air Force Field, Long Beach Airport), California, 19 April 1947 – 21 March 1951.
- Hensley Field, Texas, 18 May 1955 – 16 November 1957
- Tinker Air Force Base, Oklahoma, 18 February 2005 – 30 June 2010

=== Aircraft assigned ===
- Consolidated B-24 Liberator: (1943–1946)
- Douglas B-26 Invader: (1949–1951)
- North American T-28 Trojan: (1955)
- Lockheed F-80 Shooting Star: (1955–1957)
- North American F-86 Sabre: (1957)
