= Ridge Wood Military Cemetery =

WWI CWGC cemetery in Belgium

- Commonwealth War Graves Commission
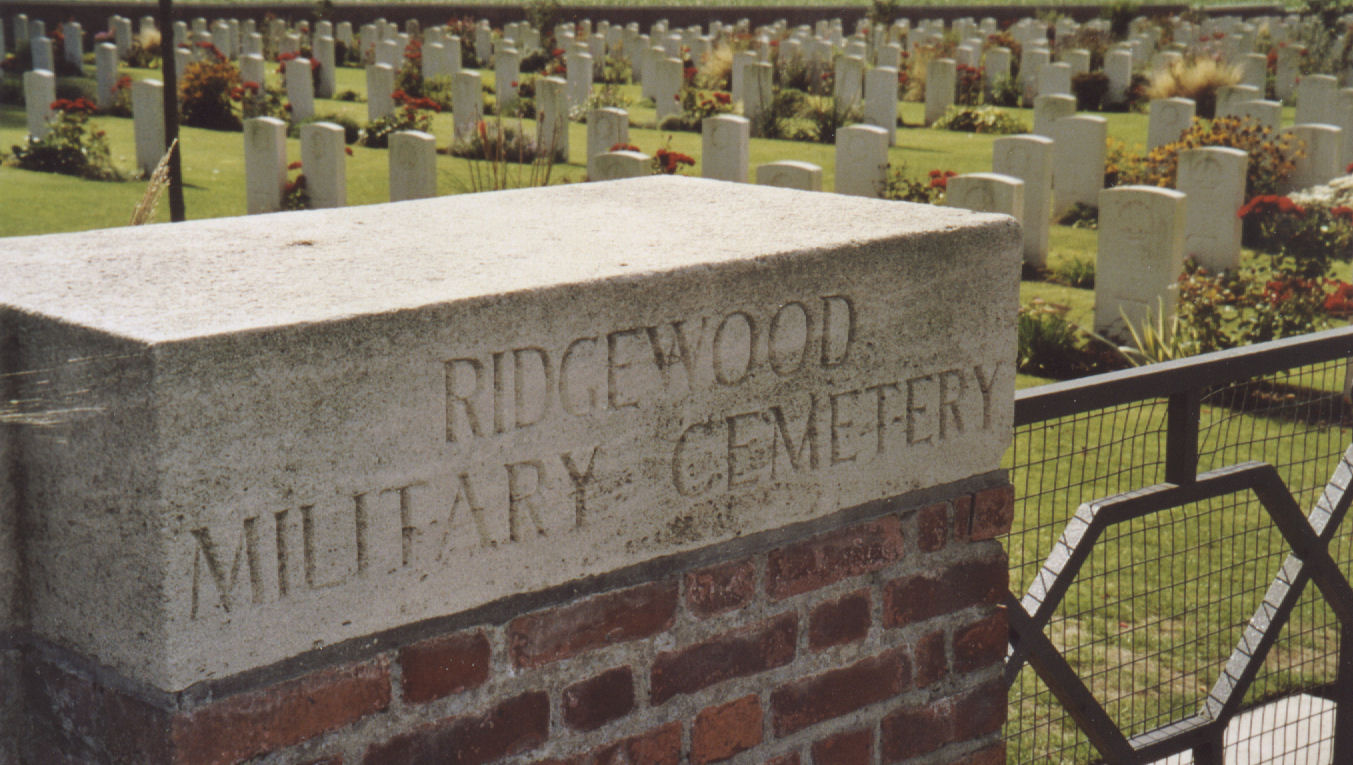
- Used for those deceased 1915–1918
- Established: 1915
- Location: 50°48′41″N 02°51′00″E near Ypres, West Flanders, Belgium
- Designed by: Sir Edwin Lutyens
- Total burials: 621
- Unknowns: 426

Burials by nation
- Allied Powers: Canada 292; United Kingdom 280; Australia 44; New Zealand 3; Central Powers: Germany: 2

Burials by war
- World War I: 621
- Statistics source: WW1Cemeteries.com and CWGC

Ridge Wood Military Cemetery (misspelt Ridgewood on the entrance stone) is a Commonwealth War Graves Commission (CWGC) burial ground for the dead of British Commonwealth soldiers who fought in the First World War. The cemetery is in Voormezeele, West Flanders, Belgium, in the Ypres Salient of the Western Front.

The cemetery grounds were assigned to the United Kingdom in perpetuity by King Albert I of Belgium in recognition of the sacrifices made by the British Empire in the defence and liberation of Belgium during the war.

== Foundation ==
The cemetery was established in May 1915 for front line troops defending the area. The cemetery was used by the Royal Irish Rifles, the Durham Light Infantry and Canadian battalions.

The cemetery is in a dip behind a ridge that was the site of a wood. In the German spring offensive of 1918, German forces pushed the front line on to the ridge, being moved back in July, before being swept away completely later in the year during the Hundred Days Offensive by the 6th and 33rd Divisions.

Of the 621 burials at the site, 292 are from Canada, 280 from the United Kingdom, 44 from Australia and 3 from New Zealand, in addition to two from Germany. The cemetery previously contained graves of a number of French soldiers, but these were concentrated elsewhere later.

The cemetery was designed by British architect Sir Edwin Lutyens.
