= McCook Army Air Field =

Airport in Nebraska, United States

McCook Army Airfield
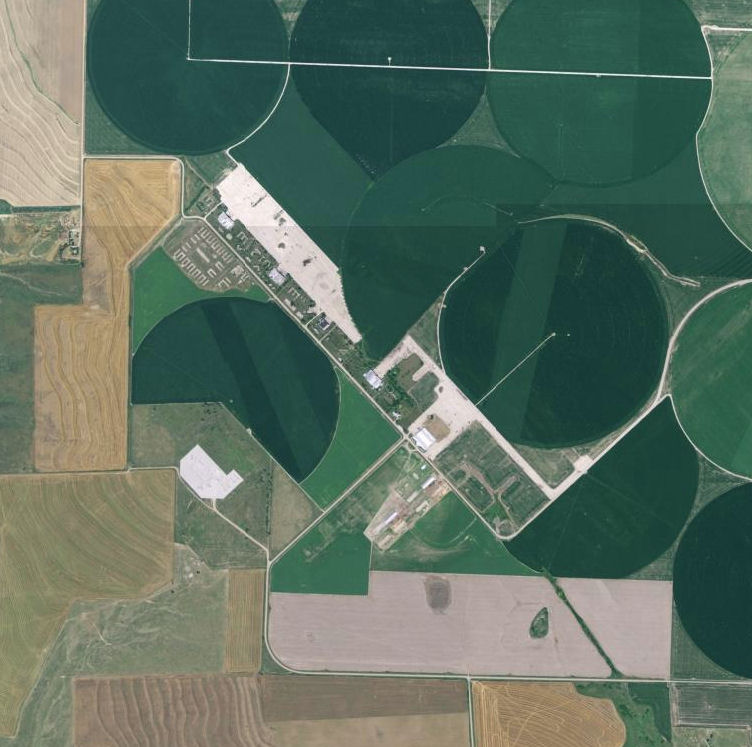
- 2006 USGS Orthophoto
- IATA: none; ICAO: none

Summary
- Airport type: Military
- Owner: USAAF
- Location: Red Willow County, near McCook, Nebraska
- Coordinates: 40°18′25″N 100°42′07″W

Map
- Location of McCook Army Airfield

Runways
Direction	Length		Surface
Direction	ft	m	Surface
17/35	7,500	2,286	Concrete
13/31	7,500	2,286	Concrete
04/22	7,500	2,286	Concrete
- All runways removed except a 20' strip

McCook Army Airfield was activated on 1 April 1943. It is located nine miles (14 km) northwest of McCook, a city in Red Willow County, Nebraska, United States and is southwest of North Platte, Nebraska. It was constructed in 1943. The 2,100-acre (8.5 km^{2}) site is bordered on all sides by level farm ground.

== History ==
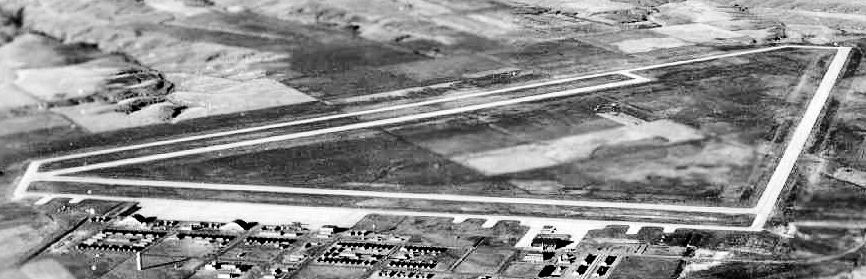
McCook Army Airfield, 1944, looking northeast

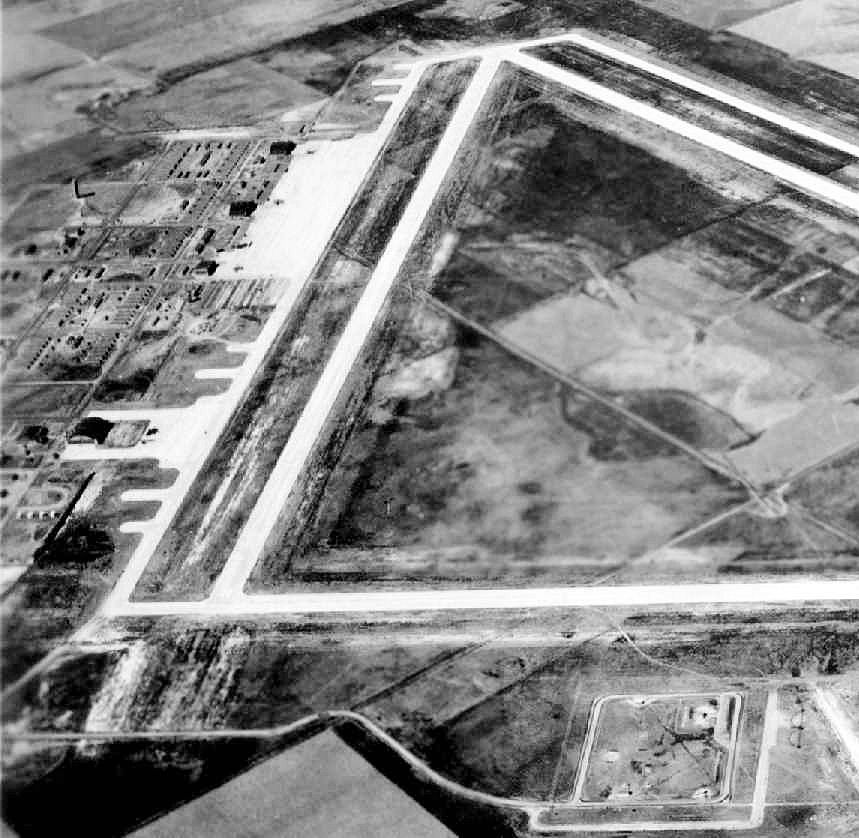
McCook Army Airfield, 1944, looking northwest

McCook AAF was one of eleven United States Army Air Forces training bases in Nebraska during World War II. The 2,100-acre (8.5 km^{2}) base included three 150 by 7,500-foot (2,300 m) concrete runways, five hangars, and barracks for 5,000 men. It operated with three divisions: Base Services (hospital, chapel, theater, band, gymnasium, fire station, post office, photo lab, library, and military police); Maintenance and Supply (air service groups, post engineers, machine shop, warehouses); and Training (celestial navigation, gunnery and bombing, communications, radar, and aircraft maintenance). Approximately 110 buildings and structures were constructed.

The airfield was activated on 1 April 1943, under the command of Second Air Force Headquarters, Colorado Springs, Colorado. The host unit at the airfield was the 520th Operational Training Unit as part of Air Technical Service Command. The 520th was assigned to the 16th Bombardment Operational Training Wing (August 1943 - March 1944), then transferred to the 17th Bombardment Training Wing in March 1944 for B-29 training.

The base itself was maintained by the 4506th Army Air Force Base Unit commanded by Lt. Colonel A.S. Penniston.

McCook provided final training of heavy bomber crews for the B-17 Flying Fortress, Consolidated B-24 Liberator and Boeing B-29 Super Fortress. Some 15,000 servicemen and 500 civilians were stationed at McCook. Bomber crew members received final proficiency training at the field before deployment in North Africa, Europe, and Pacific Theater of Operations.

Among the bomb groups trained at McCook were elements of the 8th, 15th, and 20th Air Forces. These bomb groups saw combat in the European, Mediterranean, and Pacific Theaters.

The following USAAF Groups were stationed at McCook:

- 454th Bombardment Group (Heavy) (July - October 1943)

736th, 737th, 738th and 739th Bombardment Squadrons
Deployed to Fifteenth Air Force in Italy (B-24 Liberator)

- 486th Bombardment Group (Heavy) (September - November 1943)

832nd, 833rd, 834th and 835th Bombardment Squadrons
Deployed to Eighth Air Force in England (B-24 Liberator)

- 465th Bombardment Group (Heavy) (October 1943 - February 1944)

780th, 781st, 782nd and 783rd Bombardment Squadrons
Deployed to Fifteenth Air Force in Italy (B-24 Liberator)

- 493d Bombardment Group (Heavy) (November 1943 - January 1944)

860th, 861st, 862nd and 863rd Bombardment Squadrons
Deployed to Eighth Air Force in England (B-17 Flying Fortress)

- 9th Bombardment Group (Very Heavy) (May - November 1944)

1st, 5th, 99th and 430th Bombardment Squadrons
Deployed to Twentieth Air Force in Tinian (B-29 Superfortress)

- 331st Bombardment Group (Very Heavy) (November 1944 - April 1945)

355th, 356th, and Bombardment 357th Squadrons
Deployed to Twentieth Air Force in Guam (B-29 Superfortress)

- 98th Bombardment Group (Very Heavy) (25 June-1- November 1945)

343rd, 344th, 345th and 415th Bombardment Squadrons (B-29 Superfortress)
Inactivated 18 November 1945

- 448th Bombardment Group (Very Heavy) (8 September- 4 December 1945)

712th, 713th, 714th, and 715th Bombardment Squadrons
Inactivated 4 December 1945

With the inactivation of the 448th Bomb Group, McCook AAF was inactivated and placed in reserve status under supervision of the 2347th Air Force Reserve Training Center. The Airfield closed on 31 December 1945, and was acquired by the state of Nebraska from the War Assets Administration in 1947.

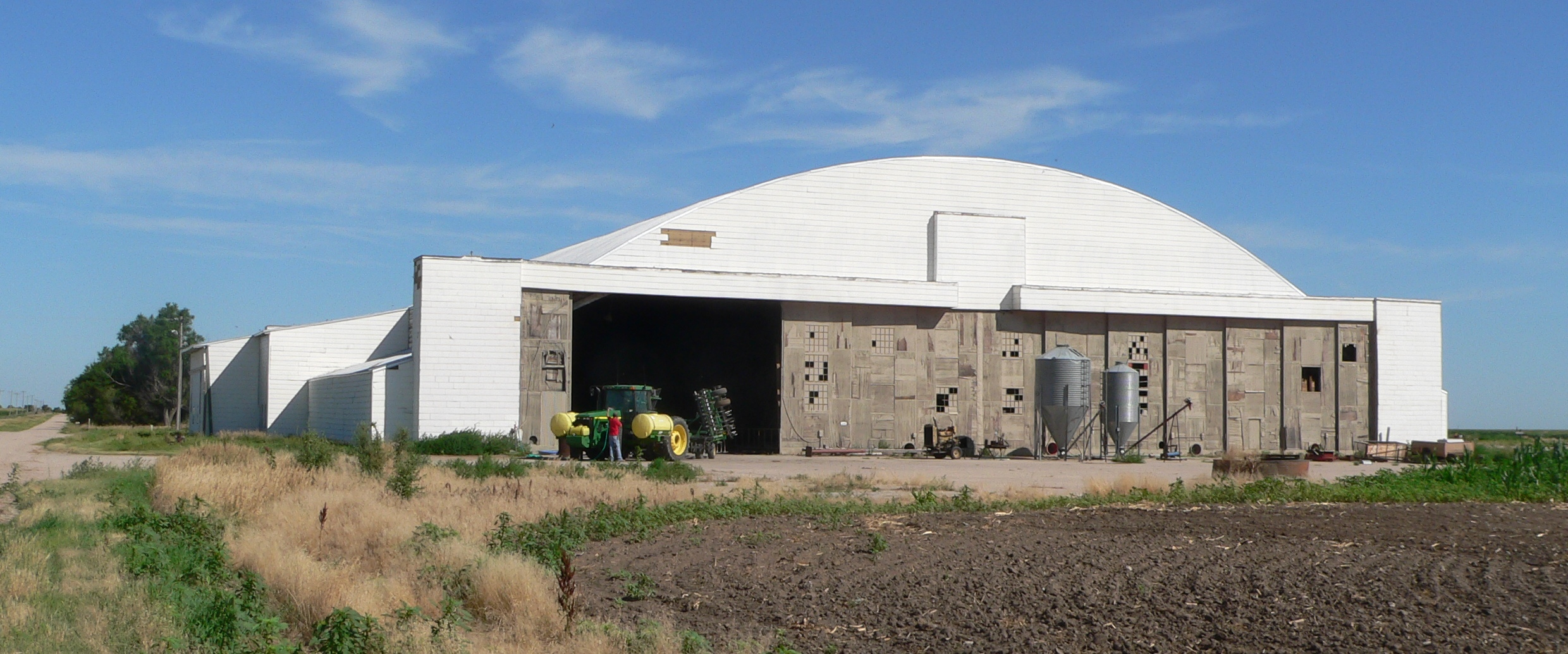
A former hangar at McCook Army Airfield.

In 1950, the city of McCook took possession of the airfield for a municipal airport, however, found that its distant location from the city made it inconvenient. The city of McCook turned the McCook airfield back to the State of Nebraska in 1952.

Today the land is owned primarily by farmers and the Nebraska Bureau of Land Management. Most of the concrete runways have been removed except for a 20' strip on the E-W and SW-NE runways. About a dozen World War II-era buildings still exist at the former airfield in various states of deterioration including four of the hangars.

== See also ==
- Nebraska World War II Army Airfields
