= 448th Supply Chain Management Wing =

448th Supply Chain Management Wing

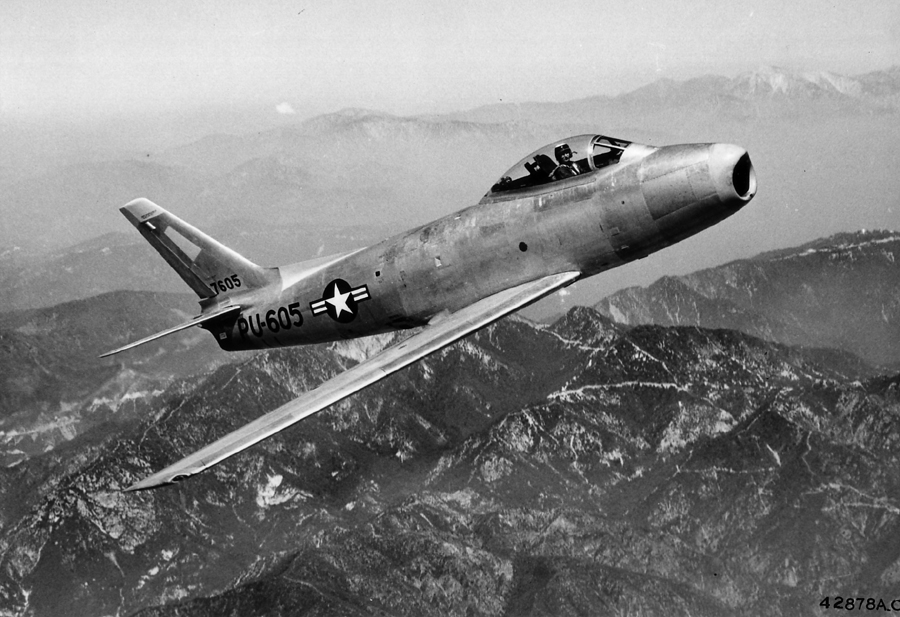
- F-86 Sabre, last aircraft flown by the 448th Fighter-Bomber Wing
- Active: 1949–1951; 1955–1957; 2005–present
- Country: United States
- Branch: United States Air Force
- Role: Equipment logistics
- Part of: Air Force Materiel Command
- Garrison/HQ: Tinker Air Force Base
- Nickname: The Lone Star Wing (1955–1957)
- Mottos: Global Logistics, Warfighter Focus
- Decorations: Air Force Outstanding Unit Award

Commanders
- Current commander: Director Mr. Dennis D'Angelo

Insignia
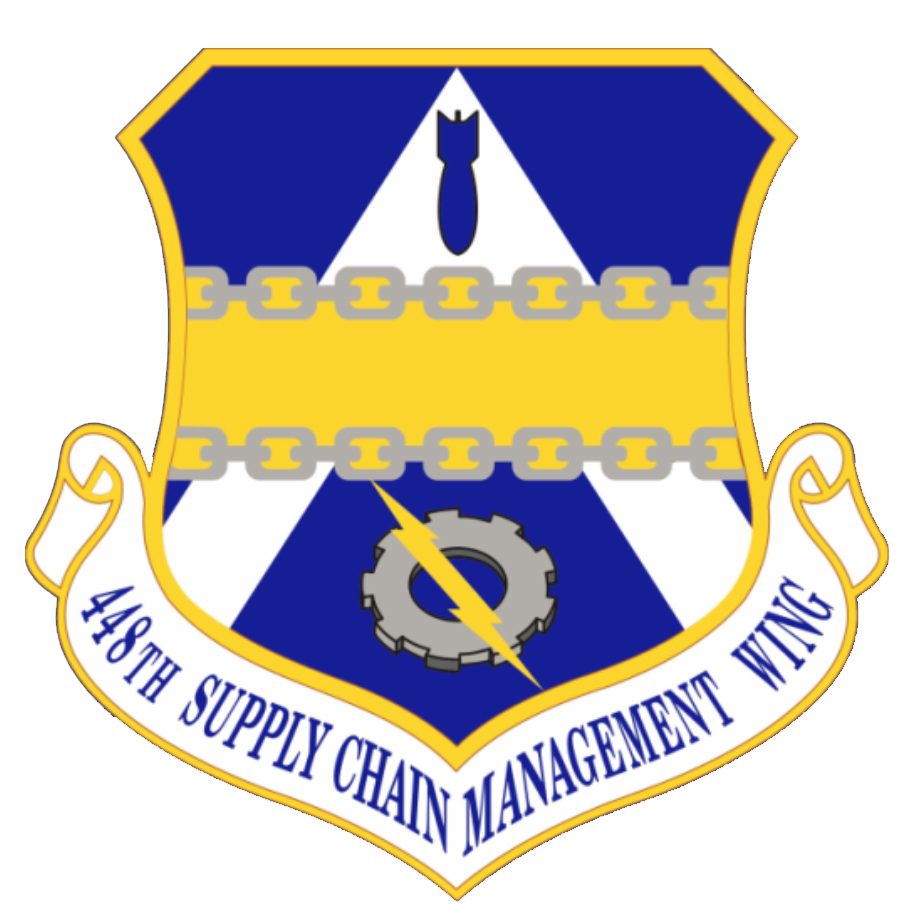
- 448th Supply Chain Management Wing emblem (Note: Approved 30 November 2005. Modified 5 June 2008 to update unit designation on the scroll.)

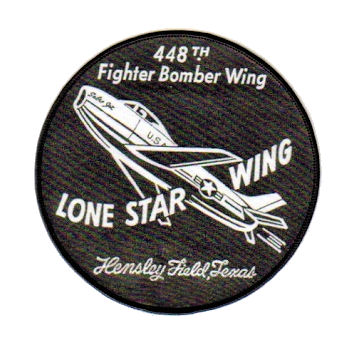
- Logo used by 448th Fighter-Bomber Wing

The 448th Supply Chain Management Wing, a wing of the Air Force Sustainment Center of Air Force Materiel Command serves as the Air Force's supply chain manager headquartered at Tinker Air Force Base, Oklahoma.

The wing was first activated in the reserve as the 448th Bombardment Wing in 1949 when Continental Air Command converted its reserve flying organizations under the wing base organization system. It was called to active duty in 1951 for the Korean War, but inactivated a few days when its personnel were transferred to other units.

It was activated again as the 448th Fighter-Bomber Wing in 1955, when it replaced a flying training wing at Hensley Field, Texas. It was inactivated two years later when the Air Force converted its reserve flying units to troop carrier units.

== Mission ==
Plan and execute the Air Force supply chain to enable weapon system employment when and where needed.

== History ==
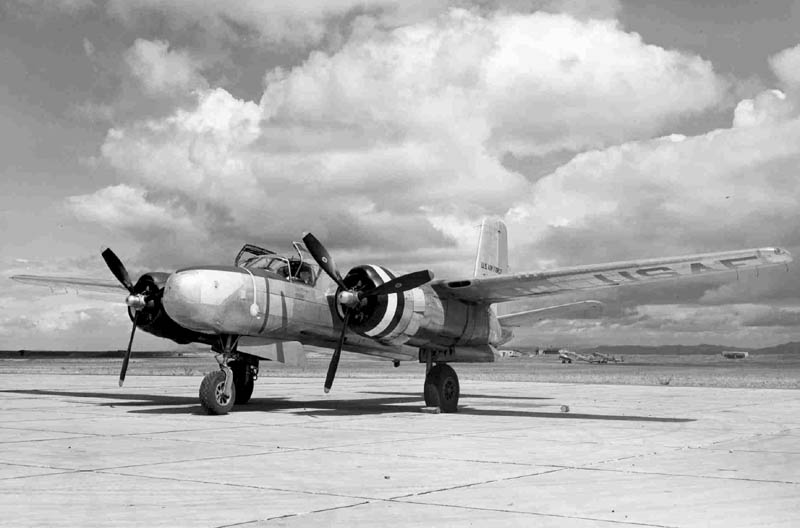
A-26 of the Air Force Reserve

For additional history and lineage, see 448th Fighter-Bomber Group

The wing was first activated at Long Beach Municipal Airport when Continental Air Command reorganized its reserve flying units under the wing base organization system as the headquarters for the 448th Bombardment Group, which was already stationed at Long Beach, and the 448th's support elements. The wing was equipped with Douglas B-26 Invaders and a variety of trainers. It trained as a reserve bombardment wing under supervision of the 2347th Air Force Reserve Training Center.

The wing lost more than half of its personnel in August 1950 when the 452d Bombardment Wing, also located at Long Beach, was called to active service as a result of the Korean War. The 448th was ordered to active service in March 1951 as the war continued, but its personnel were used as fillers in other units.

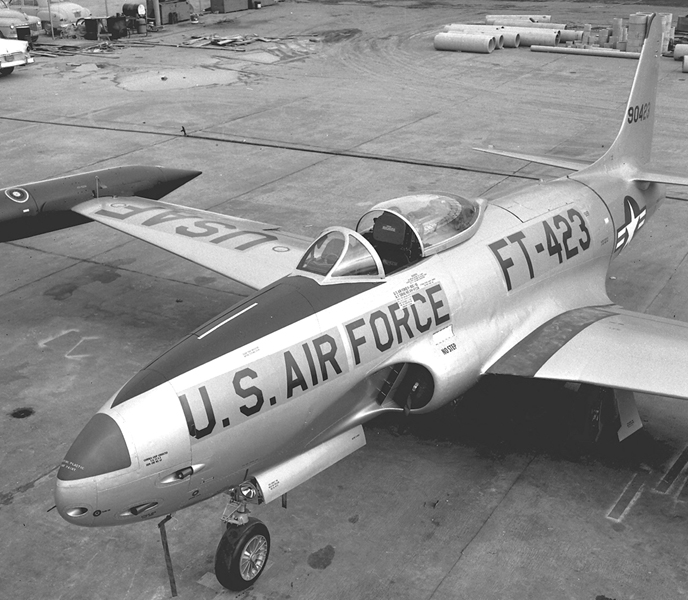
F-80 as flown by the wing from 1955 to 1957

The wing was reactivated as the 448th Fighter Bomber Wing in May 1955. It replaced the 8708th Pilot Training Wing at Hensley Field, Texas and took over the 8708th's North American T-28 Trojans. It trained as a reserve fighter-bomber wing with Lockheed F-80 Shooting Stars under the 2683d Air Reserve Center until inactivated in 1957, shortly after acquiring North American F-86 Sabres. The Air Force decided in the late 1950s to convert all its operational reserve units to troop carrier units. Its place at Hensley was taken by the reserve 69th Troop Carrier Squadron.

== Lineage ==
- Constituted as the 448th Bombardment Wing, Light on 10 May 1949

Activated in the reserve on 27 June 1949
Ordered into active service on 17 March 1951
Inactivated on 21 March 1951

- Redesignated 448th Fighter-Bomber Wing on 12 April 1955

Activated in the reserve on 18 May 1955
Inactivated on 16 November 1957

- Redesignated 448th Tactical Fighter Wing on 31 July 1985 (remained inactive)
- Redesignated 448th Combat Sustainment Wing on 31 January 2005

Activated on 18 February 2005
Redesignated: 448th Supply Chain Management Wing on 1 April 2008

=== Assignments ===
- Fourth Air Force, 27 June 1949 – 21 March 1951
- Fourteenth Air Force, 18 May 1955 – 16 November 1957
- Oklahoma City Air Logistics Center (later Oklahoma City Air Logistics Complex), 18 February 2005 (attached to Air Force Sustainment Center after 11 July 2012)
- Air Force Sustainment Center, 1 October 2012 – present

=== Components ===
- 448th Air Base Group: 27 June 1949 – 21 March 1951; 18 May 1955 – 16 November 1957
- 448th Aircraft Commodities Sustainment Group: 18 February 2005 – 14 April 2006
- 448th Fighter-Bomber Group (later 448th Eagle Propulsion Sustainment Group, 448th Combat Sustainment Group, 448th Supply Chain Management Group): 27 June 1949 – 21 March 1951; 18 May 1955 – 16 November 1957; 18 February 2005 – 30 June 2010
- 448th Hawk Propulsion Sustainment Group, 18 February 2005 – 14 April 2006
- 448th Maintenance and Supply Group: 27 June 1949 – 21 March 1951; 18 May 1955 – 16 November 1957
- 448th Materiel Sustainment Group, 18 February 2005 – 14 April 2006
- 448th Medical Group (later 448th Tactical Hospital): 27 June 1949 – 21 March 1951; 18 May 1955 – 16 November 1957
- 638th Supply Chain Management Group: 1 April 2008 – present

Robins Air Force Base, Georgia

- 748th Combat Sustainment Group (later 748th Supply Chain Management Group): 14 April 2006 – present

Hill Air Force Base, Utah

- 848th Combat Sustainment Group (later 848th Supply Chain Management Group): 14 April 2006 – present
- 948th Combat Sustainment Group (later 948th Supply Chain Management Group): 14 April 2006 – present

=== Stations ===
- Long Beach Municipal Airport, California 27 June 1949 – 21 March 1951
- Hensley Field (later Naval Air Station Dallas), Texas 18 May 1955 – 16 November 1957
- Tinker Air Force Base, Oklahoma, 18 February 2005 – present

=== Aircraft ===
- North American T-6 Texan, 1949–1950
- Beechcraft T-7 Navigator, 1949–1951
- Beechcraft T-11 Kansan, 1949–1951
- Douglas B-26 Invader, 1949–1951
- North American T-28 Trojan, 1955, 1955–1957
- Lockheed T-33 T-Bird, 1955–1957
- Lockheed F-80 Shooting Star, 1955–1957
- North American F-86 Sabre, 1957

== See also ==
- List of Douglas A-26 Invader operators
- List of F-86 Sabre units
