= Pölitz =

- Municipality
- Coat of arms

- Location of Pölitz within Stormarn district
- Interactive map of Pölitz
- Location within Germany Location within Schleswig-Holstein
- Coordinates: 53°47′N 10°23′E
- Country: Germany
- State: Schleswig-Holstein
- District: Stormarn
- Municipal assoc.: Bad Oldesloe-Land
- Subdivisions: 4

Government
  - Mayor: Joachim von Rein (CDU)

Area
  - Total: 12.96 km^{2} (5.00 sq mi)
- Elevation: 35 m (115 ft)

Population (2025-12-31)
  - Total: 1,243
  - Density: 95.91/km^{2} (248.4/sq mi)
- Time zone: UTC+01:00 (CET)
  - Summer (DST): UTC+02:00 (CEST)
- Postal codes: 23847
- Dialling codes: 04531, 04539
- Vehicle registration: OD
- Website: www.amt-bad- oldesloe-land.de

Pölitz (German pronunciation: [ˈpøːlɪts]) is a municipality in the district of Stormarn, in Schleswig-Holstein, Germany.
