= Fallersleben =

- Ortsteil of Wolfsburg
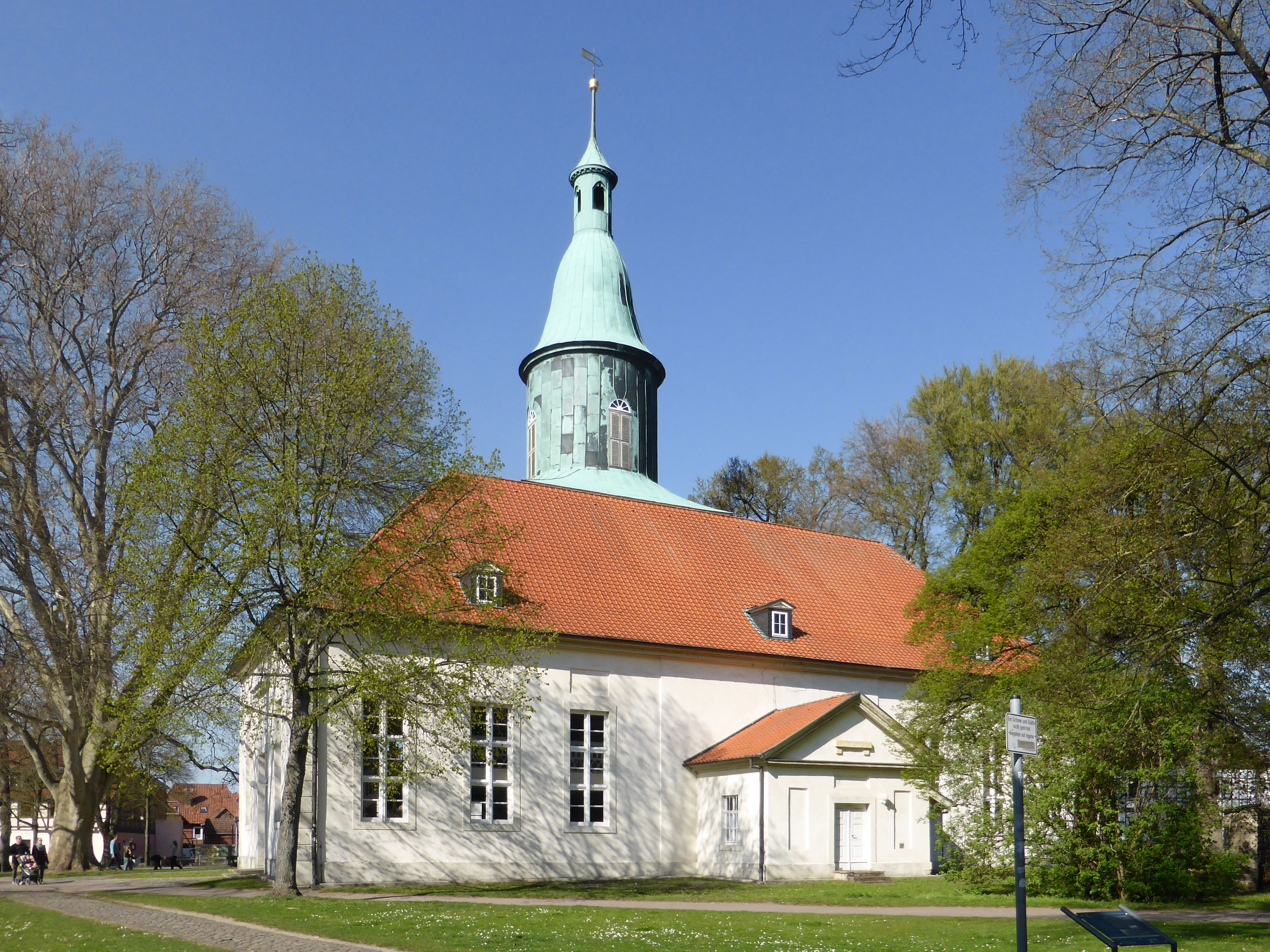
- Lutheran St. Michael Church

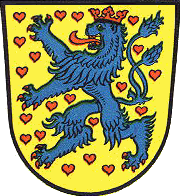
- Coat of arms
- Interactive map of Fallersleben
- Location within Germany Location within Lower Saxony
- Coordinates: 52°25′08″N 10°43′01″E
- Country: Germany
- State: Lower Saxony
- District: Urban district
- City: Wolfsburg

Government
  - Mayor: Bärbel Weist (PUG)

Population
  - Total: 11,269
- Time zone: UTC+01:00 (CET)
  - Summer (DST): UTC+02:00 (CEST)
- Postal codes: 38442
- Dialling codes: 05362
- Vehicle registration: WOB
- Website: www.fallersleben.de

Fallersleben is a part (Ortsteil) of the City of Wolfsburg, Lower Saxony, Germany, with a population of 11,269 (as of 2010). The village of Fallersleben was first mentioned in 942 under the name of Valareslebo. Fallersleben became a city in 1929, and was incorporated into Wolfsburg in 1972. Before 1972, it belonged to Gifhorn. In 1939, Fallersleben had a population of 2,600 inhabitants.

== Notable residents ==
- August Heinrich Hoffmann von Fallersleben (1798–1874), romantic poet best known for writing "Deutschlandlied", anthem of Germany.
