= Foreign relations of the Netherlands =

The foreign policy of the Netherlands is based on four basic commitments: to the Atlantic cooperation, to European integration, to international development and to international law. While historically the Kingdom of the Netherlands was a neutral state, since 1945 it has become a member of NATO, the United Nations, the European Union and many other international organizations. The Dutch economy is very open and relies on international trade. During and after the 17th century—its Golden Age—the Dutch built up a commercial and colonial empire. It was a leading shipping and naval power and was often at war with England, its main rival. Its main colonial holding was Indonesia, which fought for and achieved independence after 1945. The historical ties inherited from its colonial past still influence the foreign relations of the Netherlands. Foreign trade policy is handled by the European Union. The Dutch have been active in international peacekeeping roles.

== History ==
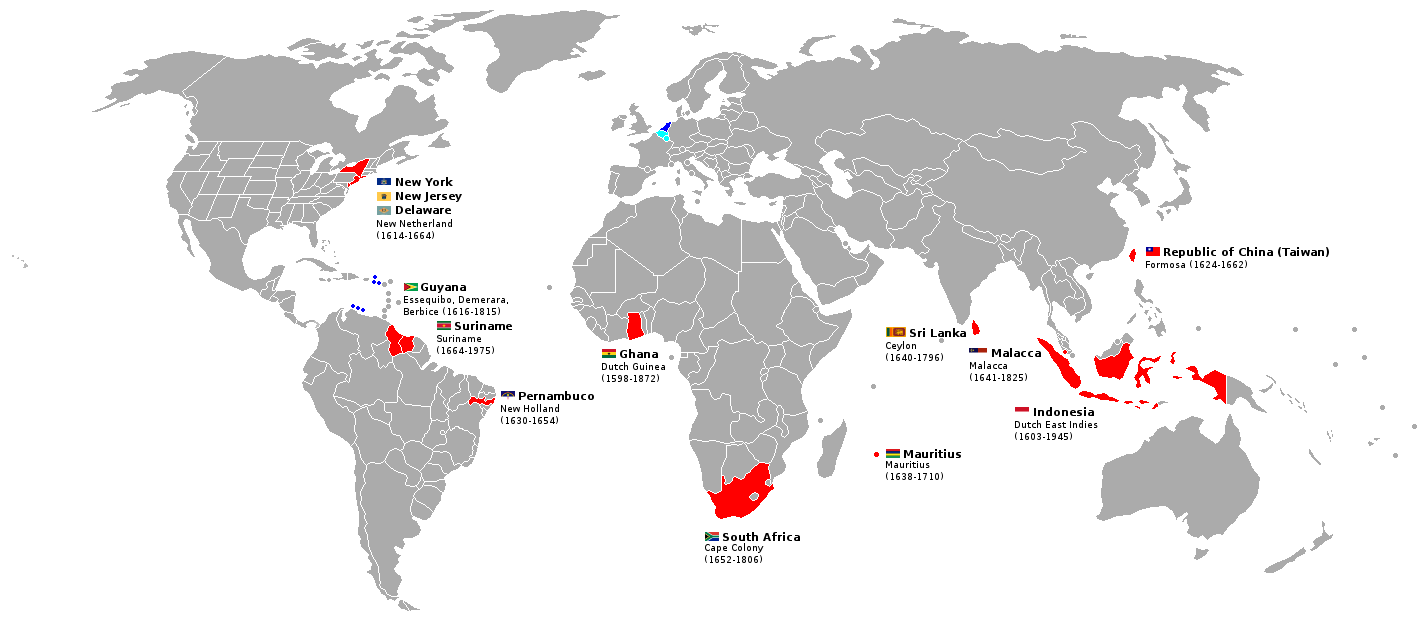
Former colonial possessions of the Dutch Empire.

In the Dutch Golden Age, which had its zenith around 1667, there was a flowering of trade, industry, the arts and the sciences. A rich worldwide Dutch empire developed and the Dutch East India Company became one of the earliest and most important of national mercantile companies based on entrepreneurship and trade.

During the 18th century, the power and wealth of the Netherlands declined. A series of wars with the more powerful British and French neighbors weakened it. Britain seized the North American colony of New Amsterdam, turning it into New York. There was growing unrest and conflict between the Orangists and the Patriots. The French Revolution spilled over after 1789, and a pro-French Batavian Republic was established in 1795–1806. Napoleon made it a satellite state, the Kingdom of Holland (1806–1810), and later simply a French imperial province.

In 1815–1940 it was neutral and played a minor role in world diplomacy, apart from a failed effort to control the seceding Southern provinces that became Belgium before giving up in 1839.

Unlike most European countries, the Netherlands succeeded in remaining neutral throughout The Great War. This approach failed during the Second World War however and the kingdom quickly fell to an unprovoked German invasion in 1940 and would remain under Nazi occupation until being liberated by the allies in 1945. After the war, as a member of the allies, the Netherlands was included in the first class of U.N. members. During the Cold War like most Western European countries, the Dutch aligned with the United States against the Soviet Union, co-founding the North Atlantic Treaty Organization (NATO), in 1949. The Dutch were also at the forefront of promoting European cooperation and integration during this time period; co-founding the European Coal and Steel Community and becoming one of the European Union's (EU) original members.

== European integration ==
The Dutch have been strong advocates of European integration, and most aspects of their foreign, economic, and trade policies are coordinated through the European Union (EU). The Dutch postwar customs union with Belgium and Luxembourg (the Benelux group) paved the way for the formation of the European Community (precursor to the EU), of which the Netherlands was a founding member. Likewise, the Benelux abolition of internal border controls was a model for the wider Schengen Accord, which today has 29 European signatories (including the Netherlands) pledged to common visa policies and free movement of people across common borders.

The Dutch stood at the cradle of the 1992 Maastricht Treaty and have been the architects of the Treaty of Amsterdam concluded in 1998. The Dutch have thus played an important role in European political and monetary integration; indeed, until the year 2003, Dutchman Wim Duisenberg headed the European Central Bank. In addition, Dutch financial minister Gerrit Zalm was the main critic of the violation of the Stability and Growth Pact by France and Germany in 2004 and 2005.

== Involvement in developing countries ==
The Netherlands was the 9th-largest donor country in 2021, giving $5.3 billion, about 0.5% of its gross national income (GNI), in official development assistance (ODA). The country contributes through multilateral channels, especially the United Nations Development Programme, the international financial institutions, and EU programs. A large portion of Dutch aid funds is also channeled through private ("co-financing") organizations that have almost total autonomy in choice of projects.

The Netherlands is a member of the European Bank for Reconstruction and Development, which recently initiated economic reforms in central Europe. The Dutch strongly support the Middle East peace process and in 1998 earmarked $29 million in contributions to international donor-coordinated activities for the occupied territories and also for projects in which they worked directly with Palestinian authorities. These projects included improving environmental conditions and support for multilateral programs in cooperation with local non-governmental organizations. In 1998, the Dutch provided significant amounts of aid to the former Yugoslavia and Africa. The Dutch consistently provide significant amounts of humanitarian relief aid to the victims of the worst natural disasters, such as Hurricane Mitch in Central America in 1998, the 2004 Indian Ocean earthquake and tsunami in South and Southeast Asia, Hurricane Katrina in the United States in 2005, the 2010 Haiti earthquake, and more recent catastrophes in Pakistan and Burma including Typhoon Haiyan in the Philippines in 2013, and the 2015 Nepal earthquake.

== Export assistance grants ==
"Developing countries aspiring to purchase foreign goods and services to invest in, inter alia, port facilities, roads, public transport, health care, or drinking water facilities may be eligible for a special Dutch grant facility. The grant facility, known as ORET (a Dutch acronym for Ontwikkelingsrelevante Exporttransacties, or Development-Related Export) serves to award grants to governments of developing countries for making payments to foreign suppliers."

== International organizations ==
As a relatively small country, the Netherlands generally pursues its foreign policy interests within the framework of multilateral organizations. The Netherlands is an active and responsible participant in the United Nations system as well as other multilateral organizations such as the Organization for Security and Cooperation in Europe, Organisation for Economic Co-operation and Development (OECD), World Trade Organization (WTO), and International Monetary Fund.

The Netherlands is one of the founding members of what today is the European Union. It was one of the first countries to start European integration, through the Benelux in 1944 and the European Coal and Steel Community in 1952. Being a small country with a history of neutrality it was the host country for the important Maastricht Treaty and Amsterdam Treaty and is the seat of the International Court of Justice.

== International issues ==
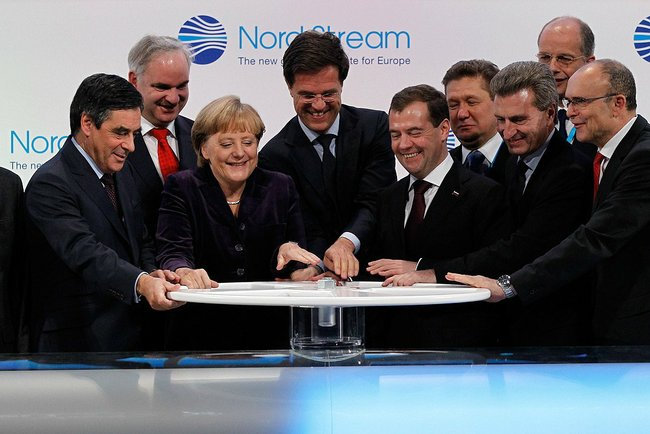
Nord Stream 1 opening ceremony on 8 November 2011 with Angela Merkel, Dmitry Medvedev, Mark Rutte and François Fillon.

The Dutch work with the U.S. and other countries on international programs against drug trafficking and organized crime. The Dutch-U.S. cooperation focuses on joint anti-drug operations in the Caribbean, including an agreement establishing Forward Operating Locations on the Dutch Kingdom islands of Curaçao and Aruba. The Netherlands is a signatory to international counter-narcotics agreements, a member of the United Nations International Drug Control Program, the UN Commission on Narcotic Drugs, and is a contributor to international counter-narcotics.

From June 26 until December 22, 2006, two children, Ammar (12–13) and Sara (10–11), lived in the Dutch embassy in Damascus because of a child custody dispute between the Dutch mother, supported by Dutch law and the Hague Convention on the Civil Aspects of International Child Abduction, and the Syrian father, supported by Syrian law (Syria is no participant of this convention). The children had been living in Syria since 2004, after an alleged international child abduction by the father from the Netherlands to Syria, during a family contact in which he supposedly would visit Paris with them. The children fled to the embassy because they would like to live with their mother in the Netherlands. Minister of Foreign Affairs Ben Bot traveled to Damascus, negotiated and on December 22 the children finally could return to the Netherlands.

The father claims that the Dutch government has promised not to prosecute him for the abduction. However, a Dutch prosecutor claims that he is free to prosecute the father and may well do that and that the Dutch have only retracted the international request to arrest him outside the Netherlands.

Mark Rutte's government provided materials to the Levant Front rebel group in Syria. In September 2018, the Dutch public prosecution department declared the Levant Front to be a "criminal organisation of terrorist intent", describing it as a "salafist and jihadistic" group that "strives for the setting up of the caliphate".

In July 2019, the UN ambassadors from 22 nations, including the Netherlands, signed a joint letter to the UNHRC condemning China's mistreatment of the Uyghurs as well as its mistreatment of other minority groups, urging the Chinese government to close the Xinjiang re-education camps.

== Diplomatic relations ==
List of countries which the Netherlands maintains diplomatic relations with:

#	Country	Date
1	France	31 July 1584
2	United Kingdom	10 August 1585
3	Denmark	31 March 1605
4	Russia	1613
5	Sweden	5 May 1614
6	Portugal	February 1641
7	Spain	29 June 1649
8	United States	19 April 1782
9	Switzerland	31 January 1814
10	Argentina	18 May 1825
11	Peru	18 July 1825
12	Brazil	12 October 1826
13	Mexico	16 June 1828
14	Colombia	1 May 1829
—	Holy See	May 1829
15	Belgium	8 June 1839
16	Costa Rica	12 July 1852
17	Japan	30 January 1856
18	Venezuela	22 March 1856
19	Guatemala	22 March 1856
20	Greece	18 April 1856
21	Dominican Republic	24 July 1856
22	El Salvador	1857
23	Italy	15 September 1859
24	Thailand	17 December 1860
25	Chile	9 January 1872
26	Ecuador	12 May 1872
27	Romania	12 February 1880
28	Iran	5 January 1883
29	Luxembourg	23 February 1891
30	Uruguay	15 April 1896
31	Paraguay	13 June 1896
32	Serbia	26 April 1899
33	Cuba	20 May 1902
34	Panama	20 April 1904
35	Norway	4 December 1905
—	Nicaragua (suspended)	30 July 1908
36	Bulgaria	8 July 1909
37	Bolivia	21 July 1911
38	Haiti	21 November 1912
39	Finland	14 August 1918
40	Poland	4 July 1919
41	Czech Republic	13 November 1919
42	Austria	19 January 1920
43	Hungary	14 January 1921
44	Egypt	16 November 1922
45	Turkey	5 August 1925
46	South Africa	25 November 1929
47	Saudi Arabia	9 June 1930
48	Iraq	10 May 1935
49	Canada	3 January 1939
50	Australia	1 February 1942
51	Iceland	9 January 1946
52	Honduras	16 March 1946
53	Lebanon	1 May 1946
54	Syria	1 May 1946
55	Ireland	28 December 1946
56	India	17 April 1947
57	Philippines	23 May 1947
58	New Zealand	19 June 1947
59	Myanmar	22 December 1947
60	Pakistan	28 February 1948
61	Liberia	3 May 1949
62	Israel	3 September 1949
63	Indonesia	October 1949
64	Ethiopia	6 November 1950
65	Germany	6 March 1951
66	Sri Lanka	23 November 1951
67	Jordan	15 December 1951
68	China	19 November 1954
69	Libya	24 June 1955
70	Sudan	15 February 1956
71	Afghanistan	2 August 1956
72	Morocco	23 March 1957
73	Malaysia	31 August 1957
74	Cambodia	11 November 1957
75	Laos	17 November 1957
76	Ghana	13 February 1958
77	Tunisia	February 1958
78	Guinea	9 March 1960
79	Nepal	2 April 1960
80	Somalia	7 July 1960
81	Democratic Republic of the Congo	25 July 1960
82	Cyprus	24 September 1960
83	Nigeria	4 November 1960
84	Madagascar	16 March 1961
85	South Korea	4 April 1961
86	Republic of the Congo	3 August 1961
87	Gabon	24 August 1961
88	Togo	5 October 1961
89	Senegal	7 November 1961
90	Cameroon	2 December 1961
91	Burkina Faso	14 December 1961
92	Niger	20 December 1961
93	Benin	26 December 1961
94	Ivory Coast	9 January 1962
95	Sierra Leone	22 February 1962
96	Tanzania	2 March 1962
97	Mauritania	9 March 1962
98	Chad	7 May 1962
99	Burundi	4 July 1962
100	Jamaica	2 August 1962
101	Algeria	17 October 1962
102	Trinidad and Tobago	19 October 1962
103	Kenya	3 February 1964
104	Uganda	10 April 1964
105	Mali	11 July 1964
106	Rwanda	1 October 1964
107	Kuwait	22 October 1964
108	Malta	6 October 1965
109	Zambia	2 November 1965
110	Singapore	7 December 1965
111	Central African Republic	10 December 1965
112	Malawi	16 December 1965
113	Gambia	1 August 1966
114	Monaco	29 August 1966
115	Botswana	10 August 1967
116	Lesotho	22 February 1968
117	Eswatini	1968
118	Mauritius	5 March 1969
119	Barbados	12 December 1969
120	Guyana	15 May 1970
121	Albania	17 November 1970
122	Equatorial Guinea	22 January 1971
123	Yemen	5 October 1971
124	Oman	1 January 1972
125	Bangladesh	11 February 1972
126	Fiji	February 1972
127	Mongolia	6 March 1972
128	Bahrain	2 May 1972
129	United Arab Emirates	6 May 1972
130	Qatar	15 June 1972
131	Vietnam	9 April 1973
132	Bahamas	28 March 1974
133	Mozambique	25 June 1975
134	Guinea-Bissau	13 August 1975
135	Tonga	4 November 1975
136	Suriname	25 November 1975
137	Angola	18 February 1976
138	Samoa	13 April 1976
139	Papua New Guinea	25 August 1976
140	Cape Verde	20 November 1976
141	Seychelles	18 January 1977
142	Comoros	21 February 1977
143	Maldives	3 September 1979
144	Grenada	1979
148	Dominica	4 February 1980
145	Zimbabwe	18 April 1980
146	São Tomé and Príncipe	20 May 1980
147	Kiribati	6 June 1980
149	Saint Lucia	1980
150	Djibouti	10 February 1981
151	Saint Vincent and the Grenadines	8 April 1981
152	Solomon Islands	1 February 1982
153	Tuvalu	February 1982
154	Vanuatu	9 March 1982
155	Belize	13 April 1982
156	Antigua and Barbuda	11 May 1982
157	Nauru	26 October 1982
158	Saint Kitts and Nevis	16 August 1984
159	Brunei	21 April 1985
160	Bhutan	10 June 1985
161	Namibia	23 April 1990
162	Latvia	24 September 1991
163	Estonia	21 October 1991
164	Liechtenstein	20 November 1991
165	Lithuania	3 December 1991
166	Slovenia	24 January 1992
167	Armenia	30 January 1992
168	Croatia	11 February 1992
169	Belarus	24 March 1992
170	Azerbaijan	1 April 1992
171	Ukraine	1 April 1992
172	Georgia	22 April 1992
173	Turkmenistan	20 May 1992
174	Kyrgyzstan	10 June 1992
175	Moldova	10 July 1992
176	Tajikistan	27 July 1992
177	Kazakhstan	10 September 1992
178	Uzbekistan	24 November 1992
179	Bosnia and Herzegovina	15 December 1992
180	San Marino	1992
181	Slovakia	1 January 1993
182	Marshall Islands	2 March 1993
183	Andorra	14 December 1993
184	North Macedonia	16 December 1993
185	Eritrea	15 July 1994
186	Federated States of Micronesia	15 April 1996
187	Palau	21 April 1997
188	North Korea	15 January 2001
189	Timor-Leste	17 November 2003
190	Montenegro	8 September 2006
—	Kosovo	27 June 2008
—	Cook Islands	16 August 2011
191	South Sudan	9 September 2011

== Bilateral relations ==
=== Africa ===
Country	Formal relations began	Notes
Burkina Faso	14 December 1961	Both countries established diplomatic relations on 14 December 1961: Burkina Faso is represented in the Netherlands by its embassy in Brussels, Belgium and an honorary consulate in Rotterdam.; The Netherlands are represented in Burkina Faso by their embassy in Bamako, Mali.
Comoros		Comoros are represented in the Netherlands by their embassy in Brussels, Belgium.; Netherlands are represented in the Comoros by their embassy in Dar es Salaam, Tanzania.
Egypt	16 November 1922	See Egypt–Netherlands relations Both countries established diplomatic relations on 16 November 1922 when Mr. J. P. graaf van Limburg Stirum was accredited as Envoy Extraordinary and Minister Plenipotentiary of the Netherlands to Egypt.: Egypt has an embassy in The Hague.; Netherlands has an embassy in Cairo.
Ethiopia	6 November 1950	See Ethiopia–Netherlands relations Both countries established diplomatic relations on 6 November 1950: Ethiopia is accredited to the Netherlands from its embassy in Brussels.; Netherlands has an embassy in Addis Ababa.
Ivory Coast	9 January 1962	See Ivory Coast–Netherlands relations Both countries established diplomatic relations on 9 January 1962: Ivory Coast has an embassy in The Hague.; Netherlands has an embassy in Abidjan.
Kenya	3 February 1964	See Kenya–Netherlands relations Both countries established diplomatic relations on 3 February 1964: Kenya has an embassy in The Hague.; the Netherlands has an embassy in Nairobi.
Liberia	3 May 1949	Both countries established diplomatic relations on 3 May 1949. Also both countries established diplomatic relations on 27 March 1936 when has been accredited Envoy Extraordinary and Minister Plenipotentiary of Liberia to the Netherlands Baron Otto van den Bogaerde van Terbrugge.
Mauritania	9 March 1962	Both countries established diplomatic relations on 9 March 1962: Mauritania is represented in the Netherlands by its embassy in Brussels, Belgium and an honorary consulate in Midwoud.; The Netherlands are represented in Mauritania by their embassy in Dakar, Senegal.
Morocco		See Morocco–Netherlands relations: Morocco has an embassy in The Hague and four consulates-general in Amsterdam, Rotterdam, 's-Hertogenbosch, and in Utrecht.; Netherlands has an embassy in Rabat and a consulate-general in Casablanca.
South Africa		See Netherlands–South Africa relations: Netherlands has an embassy in Pretoria and a consulate-general in Cape Town.; South Africa has an embassy in The Hague.; See also: Dutch immigration to South Africa

=== Americas ===
Country	Formal relations began	Notes
Argentina	24 January 1896	See Argentina–Netherlands relations Both countries established diplomatic relations on 24 January 1896.: Argentina has an embassy in The Hague.; Netherlands has an embassy in Buenos Aires.; Queen Máxima of the Netherlands is originally from Argentina.; See also: Dutch Argentine
Bolivia	21 July 1911	See Bolivia–Netherlands relations Both countries established diplomatic relations on 21 July 1911.: Bolivia has an embassy in The Hague.; Netherlands is accredited to Bolivia from its embassy in Lima, Peru.
Brazil		See Brazil–Netherlands relations: Brazil has an embassy in The Hague and a consulate-general in Rotterdam.; Netherlands has an embassy in Brasília and two consulates-general in Rio de Janeiro and São Paulo.; See also: Dutch Brazilian
Canada	3 January 1939	See Canada–Netherlands relations Both countries established diplomatic relations on 3 January 1939 Canada has an embassy in The Hague and the Netherlands has one in Ottawa, and three Consulates-General in Toronto, Montreal and Vancouver. Canada and the Netherlands have worked closely together on many foreign issues and enjoy an especially close relationship. To foster business and commercial relations between the Netherlands and Canada, the Dutch business community set up the Netherlands-Canadian Chamber of Commerce. They are both members of the United Nations (and its Specialized Agencies), the World Trade Organization, and Interpol; they are both founding members of the North Atlantic Treaty Organization (NATO), the Euro-Atlantic Partnership Council (EAPC), the Organization for Security and Cooperation in Europe (OSCE), and the Stability Pact for South Eastern Europe. Canada and the Netherlands also work together on such issues as the prohibition and elimination of anti-personnel mines, the control of the proliferation of small arms and light weapons, eradicating the worst forms of child labour, the provision of rapid reaction peacekeeping forces to the United Nations (SHIRBRIG) and regional security issues such as Bosnia (SFOR) and Ethiopia and Eritrea (UNMEE).: Canada has an embassy in The Hague.; Netherlands has an embassy in Ottawa and four consulates-general in Calgary, Toronto, Montreal, and Vancouver.; See also: Canadians of Dutch descent
Chile	10 June 1872	See Chile–Netherlands relations Both countries established diplomatic relations on 10 June 1872.: Chile has an embassy in The Hague and a consulate-general in Amsterdam.; Netherlands has an embassy in Santiago.
Colombia	1829	See Colombia–Netherlands relations Relations between Colombia and the Netherlands were established in 1829.: Colombia has an embassy in The Hague and two consulates-general in Amsterdam and Oranjestad, and a consulate in Willemstad.; Netherlands has an embassy in Bogotá and a consulate-general in Barranquilla.
Costa Rica	12 July 1852	Both countries established diplomatic relations on 12 July 1852.: Costa Rica has an embassy in The Hague.; Netherlands has an embassy in San José.
Cuba	20 May 1902	See Cuba–Netherlands relations Both countries established diplomatic relations on 20 May 1902.: Cuba has an embassy in The Hague and two consulates-general in Amsterdam and Rotterdam.; Netherlands has an embassy in Havana.
Dominica		Dominica is represented in the Netherlands by its embassy in London, United Kingdom.; The Netherlands are represented in Dominica by their embassy in Port of Spain, Trinidad and Tobago.
Dominican Republic	18 March 1892	Both countries established diplomatic relations on 18 March 1892: Dominican Republic has an embassy in The Hague and consulates-general in Amsterdam, Philipsburg, and Willemstad.; Netherlands has an embassy in Santo Domingo.
El Salvador		El Salvador has an embassy in The Hague.; Netherlands is accredited to El Salvador from its embassy in San José, Costa Rica.
Guyana	15 May 1970	Both countries established diplomatic relations on 15 May 1970. Guyana was made up of three former Dutch colonies: (Berbice, Demerara and Essequibo (colony)) which were brought together by the British and renamed collectively British Guiana.
Honduras	16 May 1946	See Honduras–Netherlands relations Both countries established diplomatic relations on 16 May 1946 when has been accredited Envoy Extraordinary and Minister Plenipotentiary of the Netherlands to Hohduras with residence in Guatemala Mr. G. M. Bijvanck.: Honduras is accredited to Netherlands from its embassy in Brussels, Belgium.; Netherlands is accredited to Honduras from its embassy in San José, Costa Rica. and an honorary consulates in Tegucigalpa.
Mexico	16 June 1828	See Mexico–Netherlands relations Both countries established diplomatic relations on 16 June 1828. On September 27, 1993, The Netherlands – Mexico Tax Treaty and Protocol was created. It explained how "in order to be exempt from, or obtain a refund of, the Mexican withholding taxes on dividends, interest and royalties." This had an update in 2008.: Mexico has an embassy in The Hague.; Netherlands has an embassy in Mexico City.
Peru		See Netherlands–Peru relations: Netherlands has an embassy in Lima.; Peru has an embassy in The Hague.
Suriname	1975-25-11	See Netherlands–Suriname relations: Netherlands has an embassy in Paramaribo.; Suriname has an embassy in The Hague and two consulates-general in Amsterdam and in Willemstad, Curaçao.; See also: Dutch Surinamese
United States	19 April 1782	See Netherlands–United States relations Embassy of the Netherlands, Washington, D.C. Embassy of the United States, The Hague Both countries established diplomatic relations on 19 April 1782 The bilateral relations between the two nations are based on historical and cultural ties as well as a common dedication to individual freedom and human rights. The Netherlands shares with the United States a liberal economic outlook and is committed to free trade. The Netherlands is the third-largest direct foreign investor in the United States, and Dutch holding companies employ more than 650,000 Americans. The United States is the third-largest direct foreign investor in the Netherlands. The United States and the Netherlands often have similar positions on issues and work together both bilaterally and multilaterally in such institutions as the United Nations and NATO. The Dutch have worked with the United States at the World Trade Organization, in the Organisation for Economic Co-operation and Development, as well as within the European Union to advance the shared U.S. goal of a more open and market-led global economy. The United States and the Netherlands joined NATO as charter members in 1949. The Dutch were allies with the United States in the Korean War and the first Gulf War and have been active in global peacekeeping efforts in the former Yugoslavia, Afghanistan and Iraq. Netherlands also support and participate in NATO and EU training efforts in Iraq. They are active participants in the International Security Assistance Force and Operation Enduring Freedom in Afghanistan.: Netherlands has an embassy in Washington, D.C., and consulates general in Atlanta, Chicago, Miami, New York City, and San Francisco.; United States has an embassy in The Hague and two consulates-general in Amsterdam and Willemstad, Curaçao.; See also: Dutch American
Uruguay	15 April 1896	See Netherlands–Uruguay relations Both countries established diplomatic relations on 15 April 1896: Netherlands is accredited to Uruguay from its embassy in Buenos Aires.; Uruguay has an embassy in The Hague.
Venezuela		See Netherlands–Venezuela relations: Netherlands has an embassy in Caracas.; Venezuela has an embassy in The Hague and consulates-general in Kralendijk, Oranjestad, and Willemstad.

=== Asia ===
Country	Formal relations began	Notes
Afghanistan	2 August 1956	Both countries established diplomatic relations on 2 August 1956 when first Envoy of Afgnanistan Dr. Sardir Najib-Ullah Khan presented his credentials to Queen of the Netherlands.: Afghanistan has an embassy in The Hague.; The Netherlands closed its embassy in Kabul in 2021.
Armenia	30 January 1992	See Armenia–Netherlands relations Both countries established diplomatic relations on 30 January 1992.: Armenia has an embassy in The Hague and two honorary consulates in Amsterdam, and Hilversum.; The Netherlands has an embassy in Yerevan.; There are around 20,000 people of Armenian descent living in Amsterdam and another 10,000 in Alkmaar.; The Netherlands has recognized the Armenian genocide in 2004.; Both countries are full members of the Council of Europe.
Azerbaijan	1 April 1992	See Azerbaijan–Netherlands relations Both countries established diplomatic relations on 1 April 1992.: Azerbaijan has an embassy in The Hague.; The Netherlands has an embassy in Baku.; Both countries are full members of the Council of Europe.
Bangladesh	1971-01-04	See Bangladesh–Netherlands relations: Bangladesh has an embassy in The Hague.; Netherlands has an embassy in Dhaka.
Bhutan	10 June 1985	See Foreign relations of Bhutan Both countries established diplomatic relations on 10 June 1985: Bhutan is represented to the Netherlands through embassy in Brussels.; Netherlands is represented to Bhutan through embassy in Delhi.
Cambodia	11 November 1957	See Cambodia–Netherlands relations: Cambodia's embassy in Brussels, Belgium is also accredited to the Netherlands; The Netherlands's embassy in Bangkok is also accredited to Cambodia
China	18 May 1972	See China–Netherlands relations: China has an embassy in The Hague and a consulate-general in Willemstad, Curaçao.; Netherlands has an embassy in Beijing and five consulates-general in Chengdu, Chongqing, Guangzhou, Hong Kong, and Shanghai.
Georgia	22 April 1992	See Georgia–Netherlands relations Both countries established diplomatic relations on 22 April 1992.: Georgia has an embassy in The Hague.; The Netherlands has an embassy in Tbilisi.; Both countries are full members of the Council of Europe.; Georgia is an EU candidate and the Netherlands is an EU member.
India	17 April 1947	See India–Netherlands relations Both countries established diplomatic relations on 17 April 1947: India has an embassy in The Hague.; Netherlands has an embassy in Delhi and consulates-general Bangalore and Mumbai.
Indonesia	1949	See Indonesia–Netherlands relations Both countries established diplomatic relations in 1949: Indonesia has an embassy in The Hague.; Netherlands has an embassy in Jakarta and four honorary consulates in Ambon, Bali, Medan, and Surabaya.; See also: Indo people
Iran	5 January 1883	See Iran–Netherlands relations Both countries established diplomatic relations on 5 January 1883 when Mirza Jawad Khan, Persian Minister in Belgium, was also accredited to the Netherlands.: Iran has an embassy in The Hague.; Netherlands has an embassy in Tehran.
Iraq	10 May 1935	See Iraq–Netherlands relations Both countries established diplomatic relations on 10 May 1935 when has been accredited Chargé d'Affaires of Netherlands to Jeddah (Saudi Arabia) C. Adriaanse also to Iraq.: Iraq has an embassy in The Hague.; Netherlands has an embassy in Baghdad and a consulate-general in Erbil.
Israel	1949	See Israel–Netherlands relations In 1947, the Netherlands voted in favor of the United Nations Resolution 181. Both countries established diplomatic relations in 1949.: Israel has an embassy in The Hague.; Netherlands has an embassy at the Ramat Gan in Tel Aviv, and two honorary consulates in Eilat and Haifa.
Japan	1609	See Japan–Netherlands relations Relations between Japan and the Netherlands date back to 1609, when the first formal trade relations were established. The relations between Japan and the Netherlands after 1945 have been a triangular relationship. The invasion and occupation of the Netherlands East Indies during World War II, brought about the destruction of the colonial state in Indonesia, as the Japanese removed as much of the Dutch government as they could, weakening the post war grip the Netherlands had over the territory. Under pressure from the United States, the Netherlands recognised Indonesian sovereignty in 1949 (see United States of Indonesia).: Japan has an embassy in The Hague.; Netherlands has an embassy in Tokyo and a consulate-general in Osaka.
Kazakhstan	10 September 1992	See Kazakhstan–Netherlands relations Both countries established diplomatic relations on 10 September 1992. The Netherlands is Kazakhstan's largest foreign investor and the second largest European Union partner in terms of foreign trade turnover with Kazakhstan.: Kazakhstan has an embassy in The Hague.; Netherlands has an embassy in Astana.
Kyrgyzstan		Kyrgyzstan is accredited to the Netherlands from its embassy in Brussels, Belgium.; the Netherlands is accredited to Kyrgyzstan from its embassy in Astana, Kazakhstan.
Malaysia	31 August 1957	See Malaysia–Netherlands relations Both countries established diplomatic relations on 31 August 1957. The graves of Dutch dignitaries in Melaka's ruined St. Paul's Church. The Dutch involvement in the Malay Peninsula used to be much more extensive than it is now. The Dutch established relations with the Sultanate of Johor in the early 17th century, and in 1641 they captured the Portuguese colony of Malacca (on the south-eastern coast of today's Peninsular Malaysia). With a long interruption during the Napoleonic Wars, the Dutch Malacca era lasted until 1824. In the 20th century, the Netherlands established diplomatic relations with Malaysia soon after the Asian state became independent. The erudite Dutch Sinologist and author Robert van Gulik (who was raised in the former Dutch East Indies himself) served as the ambassador of the Netherlands in Kuala Lumpur in the early 1960s. During his diplomatic service there he became closely acquainted with Malaysia's gibbons (he kept a few in his ambassadorial residence) and became sufficiently interested in this ape species to start the study of its role in ancient Chinese culture, the results of which he later published in his last book (Gibbon in China).: Netherlands has an embassy in Kuala Lumpur.; Malaysia has an embassy in The Hague.
Oman		See Foreign relations of Oman: Netherlands has an embassy in Muscat.; Oman has an embassy in The Hague.
Pakistan	1947-15-8	See Netherlands–Pakistan relations: Netherlands has an embassy in Islamabad and a consulate-general in Karachi.; Pakistan has an embassy in The Hague.
Philippines	20 May 1947	See Netherlands–Philippines relations Both countries established diplomatic relations on 20 May 1947.: Netherlands has an embassy in Manila.; Philippines has an embassy in The Hague.
Saudi Arabia	9 June 1930	See Netherlands–Saudi Arabia relations Both countries established diplomatic relations on 9 June 1930 when first the Netherlands Chargé d'Affaires, M. Van de Meulen, presented letters of credence to King Ibn Saud.: Netherlands has an embassy in Riyadh.; Saudi Arabia has an embassy in The Hague.
Singapore	7 December 1965	See Netherlands–Singapore relations Both countries established diplomatic relations on 7 December 1965.: Netherlands has an embassy in Singapore.; Singapore is represented in the Netherlands through its embassy in Brussels, Belgium.
South Korea	1961-01-04	See Netherlands–South Korea relations The establishment of diplomatic relations between the Republic of Korea and the Kingdom of the Netherlands began on April 1, 1961.: Relations between the Netherlands and South Korea are excellent. The Netherlands are known in the country, thanks to increasing trade and the investments made by Dutch businesses.; Political relations; South Koreans still appreciate the contribution made by Dutch troops, serving under the UN flag, during the Korean War of 1950–1953. The Netherlands was an ally to South Korea throughout the war, against communist North Korea (backed by the Soviet Union). The Netherlands still monitors developments between South Korea and North Korea with interest, and remain an ally. In 2011 the Netherlands and South Korea marked 50 years of diplomatic relations.; The Netherlands frequently serves as an example to South Korea, for example in the areas of development cooperation and water management. In 2011, for instance, a South Korean delegation visited parts of the Room for the River project – designed to make the Dutch river delta safer by 2015 – to gain inspiration for a South Korean water management plan.; The Netherlands has a Working Holiday Program Agreement with South Korea. Citizens of both countries can live and work in the other for up to two years.; Netherlands has an embassy in Seoul.; South Korea has an embassy in the Hague.; The number of the South Korean citizens living in the Netherlands in 2012 was about 2,602.
Syria	24 January 1952	See Netherlands–Syria relations
Taiwan		See Netherlands–Taiwan relations
Thailand	17 December 1860	See Netherlands–Thailand relations Both countries established diplomatic relations on 17 December 1860.: The Netherlands has an embassy in Bangkok and an honorary consulate in Phuket.; Thailand has an embassy in The Hague.
Turkey	1612	See Netherlands–Turkey relations: The Netherlands has an embassy in Ankara and a consulate-general in Istanbul.; Turkey has an embassy in The Hague and three consulates-general in Amsterdam, Deventer, and Rotterdam.; Both countries are full members of NATO and the Council of Europe.; the Netherlands is an EU member and Turkey is an EU candidate. the Netherlands opposes Turkey's accession negotiations to the EU, although negotiations have now been suspended.
Turkmenistan		the Netherlands is accredited to Turkmenistan from its embassy in Astana, Kazakhstan.; Turkmenistan is accredited to the Netherlands from its embassy in Brussels, Belgium.
United Arab Emirates		the Netherlands has an embassy in Abu Dhabi and a consulate-general in Dubai.; United Arab Emirates has an embassy in The Hague.
Vietnam		the Netherlands has an embassy in Hanoi.; Vietnam has an embassy in The Hague.

=== Europe ===
Country	Formal relations began	Notes
Albania	17 November 1970	See Albania–Netherlands relations Both countries established diplomatic relations on 17 November 1970: Albania has an embassy in The Hague.; Netherlands has an embassy in Tirana.; Both countries are full members of NATO.; Albania is an EU candidate and The Netherlands is an EU member.
Austria		See Austria–Netherlands relations: Austria has an embassy in The Hague and two honorary consulates in Amsterdam and Rotterdam.; The Netherlands has an embassy in Vienna and six honorary consulates in Bludenz, Innsbruck, Graz, Klagenfurt, Salzburg, and Linz.; Both countries are full members of the European Union.
Belarus	24 March 1992	See Belarus–Netherlands relations Both countries established diplomatic relations on 24 March 1992: Belarus has an embassy in The Hague.; The Netherlands is represented in Belarus through its embassy in Warsaw, Poland, and through an honorary consulate in Minsk.; Both countries are full members of the Organization for Security and Co-operation in Europe.
Belgium	3 August 1839	See Belgium–Netherlands relations Both countries established diplomatic relations on 3 August 1839. Relations were established after the independence of Belgium. Both nations are allies and have cultural similarities.: Belgium has an embassy in The Hague.; Netherlands has an embassy in Brussels and a consulate-general in Antwerp.; Both nations are members of the European Union and NATO.
Bosnia & Herzegovina	15 December 1992	See Bosnia and Herzegovina–Netherlands relations Both countries established diplomatic relations on 15 December 1992: Bosnia and Herzegovina has an embassy in The Hague.; Netherlands has an embassy in Sarajevo.
Bulgaria		See Bulgaria–Netherlands relations: Bulgaria has an embassy in The Hague.; The Netherlands has an embassy in Sofia.; Both countries are full members of the European Union and NATO.
Croatia	11 February 1992	See Croatia–Netherlands relations Both countries established diplomatic relations on 11 February 1992.: Croatia has an embassy in The Hague.; Netherlands has an embassy in Zagreb.; Both countries are full members of the European Union and NATO.
Cyprus		See Cyprus–Netherlands relations: Cyprus has an embassy in The Hague.; Netherlands has an embassy in Nicosia.; Both countries are full members of the European Union and of the Council of Europe.
Czech Republic	13 November 1919	See Czech Republic–Netherlands relations Both countries established diplomatic relations on 13 November 1919: Czech Republic has an embassy in The Hague.; Netherlands has an embassy in Prague.; Both countries are full members of the European Union and NATO.
Denmark		See Denmark – Netherlands relations: Both countries have had diplomatic relations since the 16th century.; Denmark has an embassy in The Hague.; The Netherlands has an embassy in Copenhagen and eight honorary consulates in Aalborg, Aarhus, Esbjerg, Fredericia, Nuuk, Odense, Rønne, and Tórshavn.; Both countries are full members of the European Union and NATO.
Estonia	5 March 1921	The Netherlands recognized Estonia on 5 March 1921. After the end of Soviet occupation the Netherlands re-recognised Estonia on 2 September 1991.; Estonia has an embassy in The Hague.; Netherlands has an embassy in Tallinn.; Both countries are full members of NATO and of the European Union.
Finland	14 August 1918	See Finland–Netherlands relations Both countries established diplomatic relations on 14 August 1918: Finland has an embassy in The Hague.; the Netherlands has an embassy in Helsinki.; Both nations are members of the European Union, NATO and the Council of Europe.; the Netherlands fully supported Finland's application to join NATO, which resulted in membership on 4 April 2023.
France	31 July 1584	See France–Netherlands relations: Both countries fought in the Franco-Dutch War.; The two countries share a border in the Caribbean island of Saint Martin: the northern part of the island is a French overseas collectivity known as the Collectivity of Saint Martin, while the southern part of the island is a Dutch constituent country known as Sint Maarten.; France maintains an embassy in The Hague and seven consulates in Amsterdam, Den Bosch, Groningen, Maastricht, Middelburg, Rotterdam, and Utrecht.; The Netherlands maintains an embassy in Paris and 12 consulates in Ajaccio, Bordeaux, Brest, Calais, Le Havre, Lille, Lyon, Marseille, Montpellier, Nice, Strasbourg, and Toulouse.; Both nations are members of the European Union, NATO and the Council of Europe.
Germany	1871	See Germany–Netherlands relations: Germany has an embassy in The Hague and a consulate-general in Amsterdam.; Netherlands has an embassy in Berlin and four consulates-general in Düsseldorf, Hamburg, Frankfurt, and Munich.; Both nations are members of the European Union and NATO.
Greece		See Greece–Netherlands relations: Greece has an embassy in The Hague.; Netherlands has an embassy in Athens.; Both nations are members of the European Union, NATO and of the Council of Europe.
Hungary		See Hungary–Netherlands relations: The Netherlands has an embassy in Budapest and an honorary consulate in Pécs.; Hungary has an embassy in The Hague and six honorary consulates in Amsterdam, Arnhem, Aerdenhout, Winsum, 's-Hertogenbosch and Curaçao.; Both countries are full members of the European Union and NATO.
Iceland	9 January 1946	See Iceland–Netherlands relations Both countries established diplomatic relations on 9 January 1946: Iceland is represented in the Netherlands by its embassy in Oslo, Norway.; The Netherlands is represented in Iceland by its embassy in Brussels, Belgium.; Both countries are full members of NATO.
Ireland		See Ireland–Netherlands relations: Ireland has an embassy in The Hague and a consulate-general in Amsterdam.; Netherlands has an embassy in Dublin.; Both countries are full members of the European Union.
Italy		See Italy–Netherlands relations: Italy has an embassy in The Hague.; the Netherlands has an embassy in Rome and a consulate-general in Milan.; Both countries are full members of the European Union and NATO.
Kosovo		See Kosovo–Netherlands relations: Kosovo has an embassy in The Hague.; Netherlands has an embassy in Pristina.
Latvia	24 September 1991	Both countries established diplomatic relations on 24 September 1991.: Latvia has an embassy in The Hague.; Netherlands has an embassy in Riga.; Both nations are members of the European Union, NATO and the Council of Europe.
Lithuania	3 December 1991	Both countries established diplomatic relations on 3 December 1991.: Lithuania has an embassy in The Hague.; Netherlands has an embassy in Vilnius.; Both nations are members of the European Union, NATO and the Council of Europe.
Luxembourg		See Luxembourg–Netherlands relations: Luxembourg has an embassy in The Hague.; the Netherlands has an embassy in Luxembourg City.; Both countries are full members of the European Union and of NATO.
Malta		Malta has an embassy in The Hague.; the Netherlands has an embassy in Valletta.; Both countries are full members of the European Union.
Moldova	10 July 1992	See Moldova–Netherlands relations Both countries established diplomatic relations on 10 July 1992: Moldova has an embassy in The Hague and an honorary consulate in Amsterdam.; The Netherlands is represented in Moldova through its embassy in Bucharest (Romania) and through an honorary consulate in Chișinău.; Both countries are full members of the Council of Europe.; Moldova is an EU candidate and the Netherlands is an EU member.
Montenegro		Montenegro has an embassy in The Hague.; the Netherlands is accredited to Montenegro from its embassy in Belgrade, Serbia.; Both countries are full members of the Council of Europe and of NATO.; Montenegro is an EU candidate and the Netherlands is an EU member.
North Macedonia		the Netherlands has an embassy in Skopje.; North Macedonia has an embassy in The Hague.; Both countries are full members of NATO.; the Netherlands is an EU member and North Macedonia is an EU candidate.
Poland	4 July 1919	See Netherlands–Poland relations Both countries established diplomatic relations on 4 July 1919: Netherlands has an embassy in Warsaw.; Poland has an embassy in The Hague.; Both countries are full members of the European Union and NATO.
Portugal		See Netherlands–Portugal relations: Netherlands has an embassy in Lisbon.; Portugal has an embassy in The Hague.; Both nations are members of the European Union, NATO and of the Council of Europe.
Romania	12 February 1880	See Netherlands–Romania relations Both countries established diplomatic relations on 12 February 1880: The Netherlands has an embassy in Bucharest and three honorary consulates.; Romania has an embassy in The Hague and four honorary consulates.; Both countries are full members of the European Union and NATO.
Russia		See Netherlands–Russia relations Both countries were establishment of diplomatic relations in 1991 after the fall of the Soviet Union. Peter the Great studied in Holland. During the Cold War, all the Dutch consecutive governments perceived the Warsaw pact including the Soviet Union and Russia as a threat to its safety.: Netherlands has an embassy in Moscow, a consulate-general in Saint Petersburg, and an honorary consulate in Yuzhno-Sakhalinsk.; Russia has an embassy in The Hague.
Serbia	1899-04-26	See Netherlands–Serbia relations: Netherlands has an embassy in Belgrade.; Serbia has an embassy in The Hague.; The Netherlands is a European Union member and Serbia is a candidate.
Slovakia	1993-01-01	See Netherlands–Slovakia relations: The Netherlands has an embassy in Bratislava.; Slovakia has an embassy in The Hague.; Both countries are full members of the European Union and NATO.
Slovenia	1991-06-25	See Netherlands–Slovenia relations: The Netherlands has an embassy in Ljubljana.; Slovenia has an embassy in The Hague.; Both countries are full members of the European Union and NATO.
Spain		See Netherlands–Spain relations: Netherlands has an embassy in Madrid.; Spain has an embassy in The Hague.; Both nations are members of the European Union, NATO and the Council of Europe.
Sweden		See Netherlands–Sweden relations: the Netherlands has an embassy in Stockholm.; Sweden has an embassy in The Hague.; Both countries are full members of the European Union, NATO and the Council of Europe.; the Netherlands fully supported Sweden's application to join NATO, which resulted in membership on 7 March 2024.
Switzerland		the Netherlands has an embassy in Bern.; Switzerland has an embassy in The Hague.; Both countries are full members of the Council of Europe.
Ukraine	1 April 1992	See Netherlands–Ukraine relations Both countries established diplomatic relations on 1 April 1992: The Netherlands has an embassy in Kyiv and a consulate in Lviv.; Ukraine has an embassy in The Hague.; Both countries are full members of the Council of Europe.; the Netherlands is an EU member and Ukraine is an EU candidate.
United Kingdom	1 April 1603	See Netherlands–United Kingdom relations Dutch Prime Minister Dick Schoof with British Prime Minister Keir Starmer in 10 Downing Street, February 2025. The UK established diplomatic relations with the United Kingdom on 1 April 1603.: The Netherlands maintains an embassy in London.; The United Kingdom is accredited to the Netherlands through its embassy in The Hague.; Both countries share common membership of the Atlantic Co-operation Pact, the Council of Europe, NATO, the OECD, the OSCE, the United Nations, and the World Trade Organization. Bilaterally the two countries have a Double Taxation Convention.

=== Oceania ===
Country	Formal relations began	Notes
Australia	31 January 1942	See Australia–Netherlands relations Both countries established diplomatic relations on 31 January 1942.: Australia has an embassy in The Hague.; Netherlands has an embassy in Canberra and a consulate-general in Sydney.
New Zealand	19 June 1947	See Netherlands–New Zealand relations Both countries established diplomatic relations on 19 June 1947.: Netherlands has an embassy in Wellington.; New Zealand has an embassy in The Hague.
Solomon Islands	1 February 1982	Both countries established diplomatic relations on 1 February 1982: Netherlands is accredited to the Solomon Islands from its embassy in Canberra, Australia.; Solomon Islands is accredited to the Netherlands from its embassy in Brussels, Belgium.
Vanuatu		Vanuatu has an honorary consulate in The Hague.

== See also ==
- List of diplomatic missions in the Netherlands
- List of diplomatic missions of the Netherlands
- Foreign relations of Curaçao
- Foreign relations of Suriname
