= Slobodan Mitrić =

Serbian writer (1948–2016)

Slobodan Radojev Mitrić Слободан Радојев Митрић
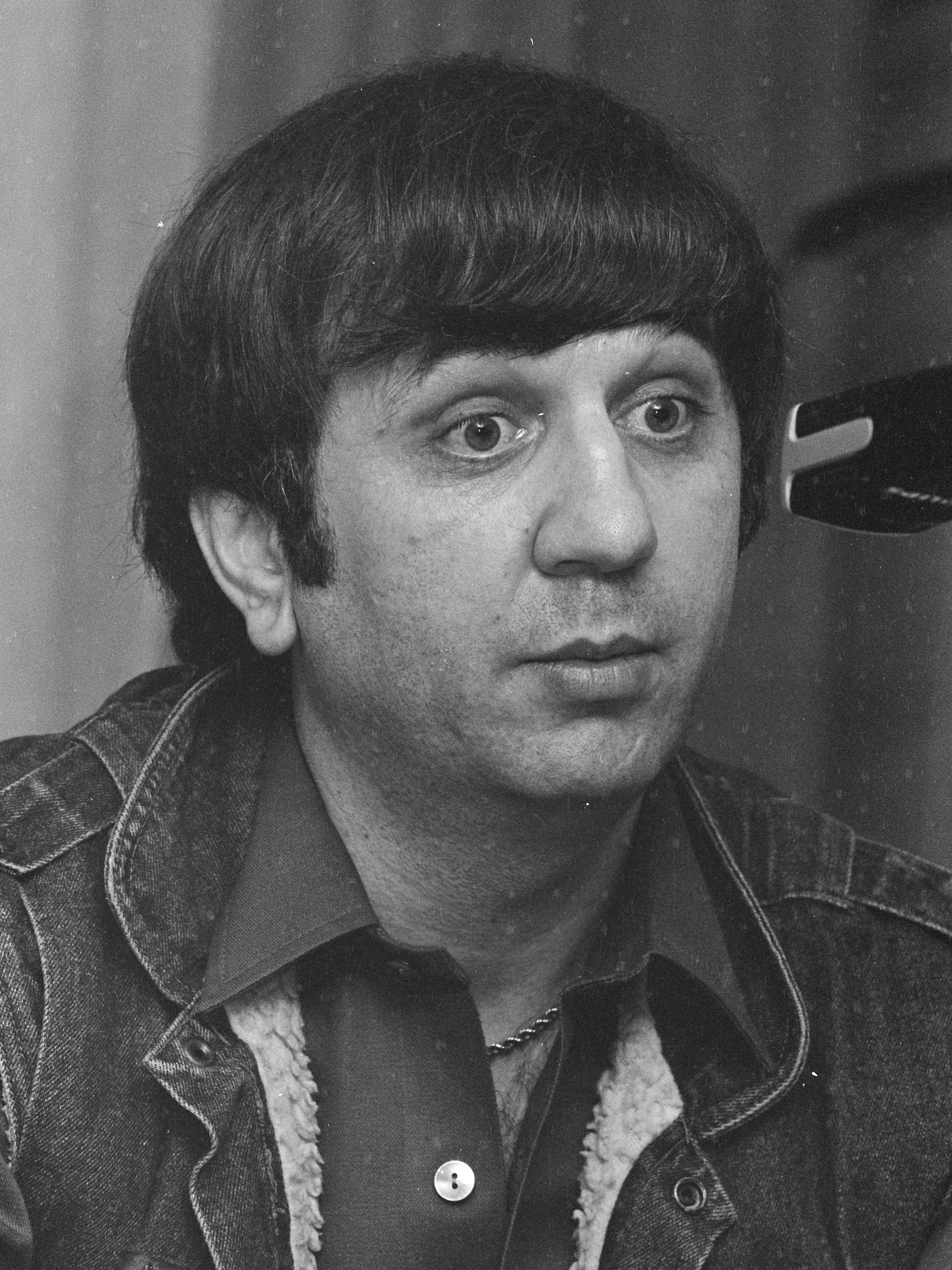
- Mitrić in 1985
- Born: 1 March 1948; Bačko Dobro Polje, PR Serbia, FPR Yugoslavia
- Died: 25 November 2016 (aged 68); Amsterdam, Netherlands
- Occupation: intelligence officer
- Espionage activity
- Codename: Karate Bob

Slobodan Radojev Mitrić (Serbian: Слободан Радојев Митрић; 1 March 1948 – 25 November 2016) was a Serbian secret agent from Yugoslavia, who resided in the Netherlands from 1973. He was known by his nickname Karate Bob.

== Life ==
=== Career ===
Mitrić specialized in karate and worked for the Yugoslav secret service. In 1973 he was ordered to carry out an assassination in Brussels. He refused to carry it out and fled to the Netherlands.

On December 25, 1973, he shot three members of the secret service of the Soviet Union and Yugoslavia on the Weteringcircuit in Amsterdam. He then shot a woman in the head in De Pijp who survived. The three had shot Mitrić with a pistol-machine gun the night before. According to Mitrić, they had been ordered from Belgrade to liquidate him. He was sentenced to 13 years in prison for triple manslaughter, which he served in Scheveningen. Through the Serbian opposition leader Dusan Sedlar, he applied to the Central Intelligence Agency.

Mitrić was released in 1986. Because it was considered plausible that he would be sentenced to death in his country of origin, the judge prohibited his deportation. Since then, Mitrić lived as an unwanted alien in the Netherlands, and wrote plays, including Boj na Kosovu (The Battle of Kosovo). He later claimed that he had been used in a heroin case by a group around Hans Teengs Gerritsen while in detention. In 1992 he is also said to have become chief commander of the 'Serbian Army' and a staff member of the 'Headquarters of War of the Free State of Serbia'. At the beginning of September 1992, pamphlets appeared in the Netherlands in which the liberation army called for revenge on the enemies of Serbia. The People's Party for Freedom and Democracy-Tweede Kamer der Staten-Generaal Jan-Kees Wiebenga and Hans Dijkstal asked questions about this to Minister Ien Dales from Internal Affairs.

=== Personal ===
Mitrić married artist Iris de Vries (1942) in Amsterdam in March 1992. The ceremony took place on a Monday morning, because then no costs were charged by the municipality of Amsterdam. The couple lived in an attic room. As of 1 August 1992, Mitrić's social assistance benefit was discontinued by the Municipality of Amsterdam, since he "resides in the Netherlands without the consent of the competent authority and can therefore be deported under the Vreemdelingenwet". From then on, the couple had to live on the single social assistance benefit from De Vries. As an unwanted alien, Mitrić was also unable to insure himself against medical expenses and had to rely on free medical help. His wife wrote numerous letters about their appalling circumstances to ministers, MPs, lawyers, professors and to the editors of the daily newspaper Trouw, but help was not forthcoming.

De Vries died on January 10, 2006, at the age of 64 and was cremated on January 17. Her social assistance benefit was terminated. Because Mitrić was not allowed to work as an unwanted alien, nor was he entitled to social assistance benefits, he started a procedure to have his status as an unwanted alien lifted. In mid-April 2006 it was announced that Mitrić had been notified to leave the Netherlands before April 26. His lawyer Mr. H. Sarolea was not here agreed, and believed that the 1986 verdict was still valid and that Mitrić was still in danger. He also thought that the minister had forfeited the right to deportation because Mitrić had been tolerated in the Netherlands for 33 years. In 2010, Mitrić stated: "It is not true that I was once a liquidator, but that I have worked as a patriot to fight terrorists and criminals without borders...". By presenting himself as a murderer, he claims to have managed to expose virtually all crimes committed against political emigrants from Yugoslavia.

In January 2012, Minister Gerd Leers decided by means of an official message that Mitrić could return to Serbia. In the meantime he was ill and had no right to health insurance and shelter. In 2014 he was allowed to stay because he was too ill. In November 2016, a report was received by the police that Karate Bob was lying in the porch of the building where he lived with serious breathing problems. Shortly after arriving at the Onze Lieve Vrouwe Gasthuis he died at the age of 68.

== Books ==
Mitrić published several books in Dutch; some were reprinted several times. In Tito's killing machine he looks back on his life until he left the Yugoslav secret service in 1973. His book on karate is mainly a description of concentration exercises and meditation techniques, aimed at achieving inner strength. In The Netherlands' Mafia, Mitrić tried to expose scandals of the Dutch mafia.

== Bibliography ==
- Podzemlje Grada Beograda (1972; De onderwereld van de stad Belgrado, niet vertaald; (https://acrobat.com/#d=ypftXSjcfIuF4rGLNs2OkA)
- Het grote karateboek van Karate Bob (1981; onder de naam 'Bob Mitrić'; vertaling van het manuscript Velika karate krjiga od Karate Bob) ISBN 9063160615
- Geheim-agent van Tito (1982; vertaald uit het Servo-Kroatisch: Titov obavestajac; https://acrobat.com/#d=f*N1TuagRpym7pUSWmJcCw) ISBN 9063160917
- Tito's moordmachine (1982; vertaald uit het Servo-Kroatisch manuscript Titova masina za ubijanje; https://acrobat.com/#d=XhZp*dIVQ1O0NTVpiX14aQ ) ISBN 9070587203
- Bijbel van de man zonder geloof (1984; toneelstuk in vier delen; vertaling van Biblia coveka bez vere; https://acrobat.com/#d=D4o7I8*fQzirWs0XuwhH2A) ISBN 9070587025
- Nederland's maffia (1985; https://acrobat.com/#d=97rn1HbmSRqjMEoN36btnA) ISBN 9070587017
- De Slag bij Kosovo (1999; toneelstukken; vertaling van Boj na Kosovu; http://slomibo.spaces.live.com/blog/cns!6CEA2A0D596836B2!747.entry) ISBN 9080381128
- Operacija blizanci (1999; roman in het Servo-Kroatisch) ISBN 9080381136
- Operation twins (2005; vertaling van Operacija blizanci uit 1999) ISBN 907393205X
- Operation twins Pre-publication, Part 2 (2006; http://www.willehalm.nl/ot2.html)
- De Gouden Tip – De verstrengeling van onder- en bovenwereld en de moord op G. J. Heijn (2008) ISBN 9789073932111
- The Golden Tip – The Entanglement of the Upper and Underworld and the Murder of Gerrit Jan Heijn (2009) ISBN 9789073932159
- Confessions of a Disgruntled Spy (2009; http://www.willehalm.nl/confessions.htm)
- Help! Ze hebben me gekidnapt! Lady Di (2010; vertaling uit het Servische manuscript "Upomoć! Kidnapovali su me! Ledi dajana") ISBN 9789073932197
- Help! They've Kidnapped Me! Lady Di (2010) ISBN 9789073932180
- 9/11 – The Accusation – Bringing the Guilty to Justice (2011), Uitgeverij Willehalm Instituut – Amsterdam, ISBN 978-90-73932-00-5 / 978-90-73932-34-0 (e-boek)
- Doodlopende weg - Waarom de Nederlandse geheime dienst hun top geheimagent Theo van Gogh heeft vermoord (2011), Uitgeverij Willehalm Instituut – Amsterdam, ISBN 978-90-73932-23-4

== See also ==
- Netherlands–Serbia relations
