= Kosovo–Netherlands relations =

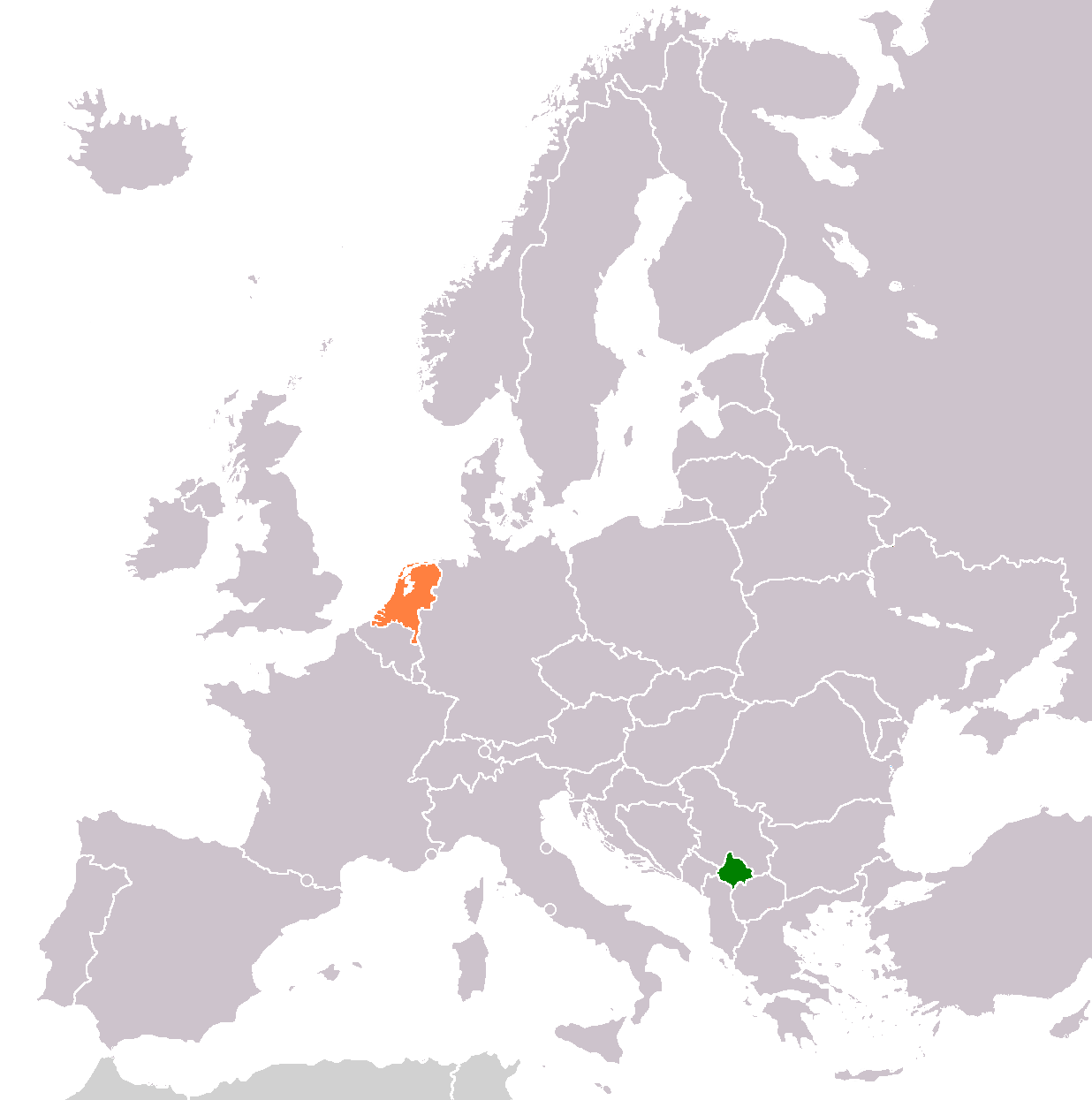
- Kosovo: Netherlands

Diplomatic mission
- Embassy of Kosovo, The Hague: Embassy of the Netherlands, Pristina

Envoy
- Ambassador Lirim Greiçevci: Ambassador Carin Lobbezoo

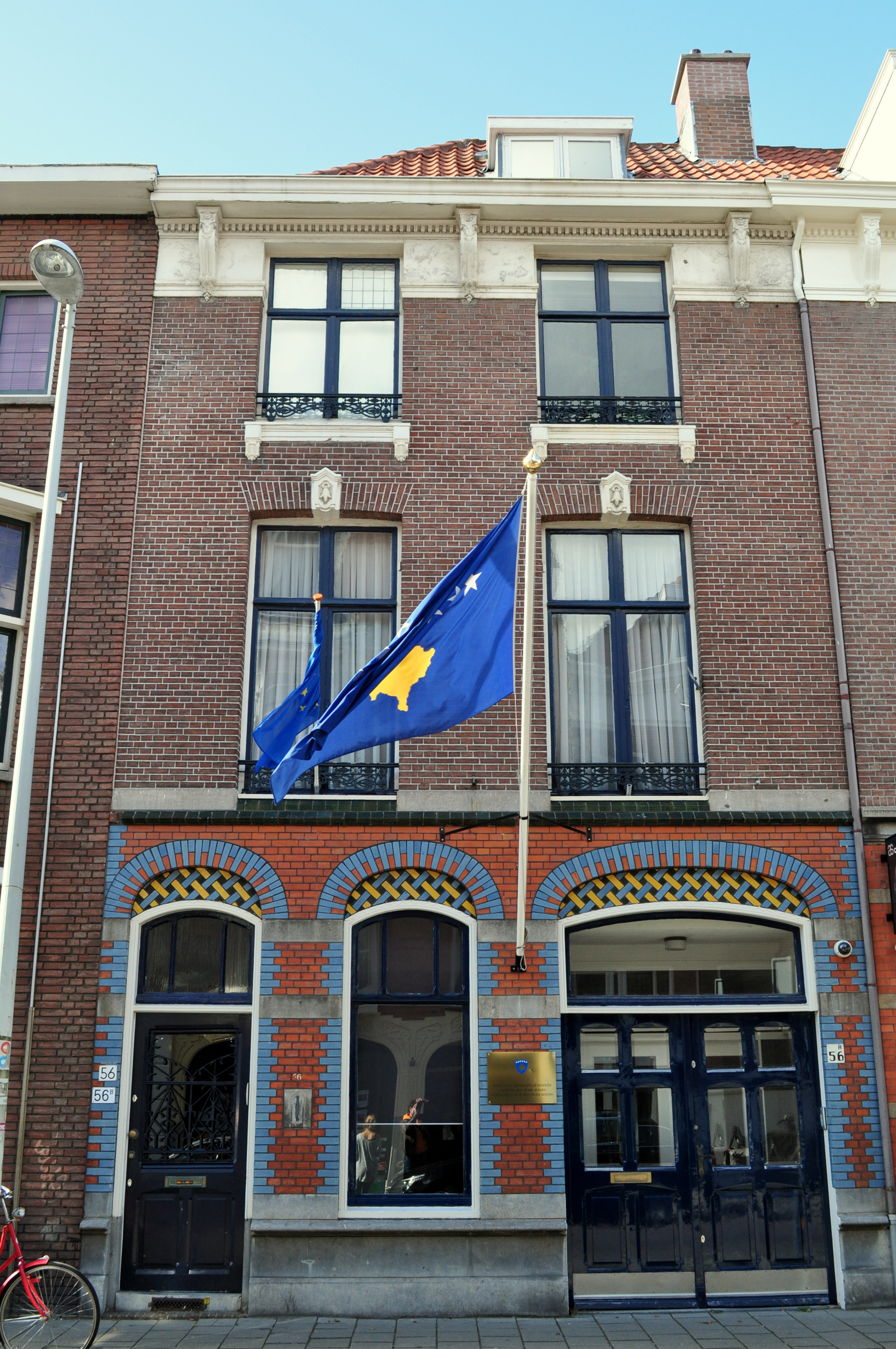
Kosovan embassy in the Netherlands.

Kosovo–Netherlands relations are foreign relations between Kosovo and the Netherlands. Kosovo declared its independence on 17 February 2008 and the Netherlands recognised it on 4 March 2008. The Netherlands have maintained an embassy in Pristina since 27 June 2008, and Kosovo opened an embassy in The Hague in November 2009. Relations between the two countries are considered to be good and the Netherlands offers support to various projects in Kosovo with the goal of aiding the country in its transition to democracy.

== High-level visits ==
=== High-level visits from Netherlands to Kosovo ===
In July 2023 Mark Rutte visits Kosovan president Vjosa Osmani and Kosovan prime minister Albin Kurti in Pristina together with Luxembourgish prime minister Xavier Bettel in light of the increasing tensions between Serbia and Kosovo

== Military ==
The Netherlands participated in the 1999 NATO bombing of Yugoslavia, which resulted in a UN administration of Kosovo and then to eventual independence. The Netherlands currently has 7 troops serving in Kosovo as peacekeepers in the NATO led Kosovo Force. Originally there were 3,600 Dutch troops in KFOR.

== Economics ==
Economic cooperation between Kosovo and the Netherlands is limited although there are several areas for cooperation between the two countries in the energy and agricultural sectors.

== Development ==
Outside of the EU framework, the Netherlands uses the Matra Programme, of which Kosovo is a beneficiary, to organise projects in countries in Central and Eastern Europe to aide them in their transition to democracy and rule of law. In the case of Kosovo, the Dutch Embassy uses this programme to encourage cooperation between the Serbian and Albanian communities in the north of Kosovo.

== See also ==
- Foreign relations of Kosovo
- Foreign relations of the Netherlands
- Kosovo-NATO relations
- Accession of Kosovo to the EU
- Netherlands–Serbia relations
