= Netherlands–Spain relations =

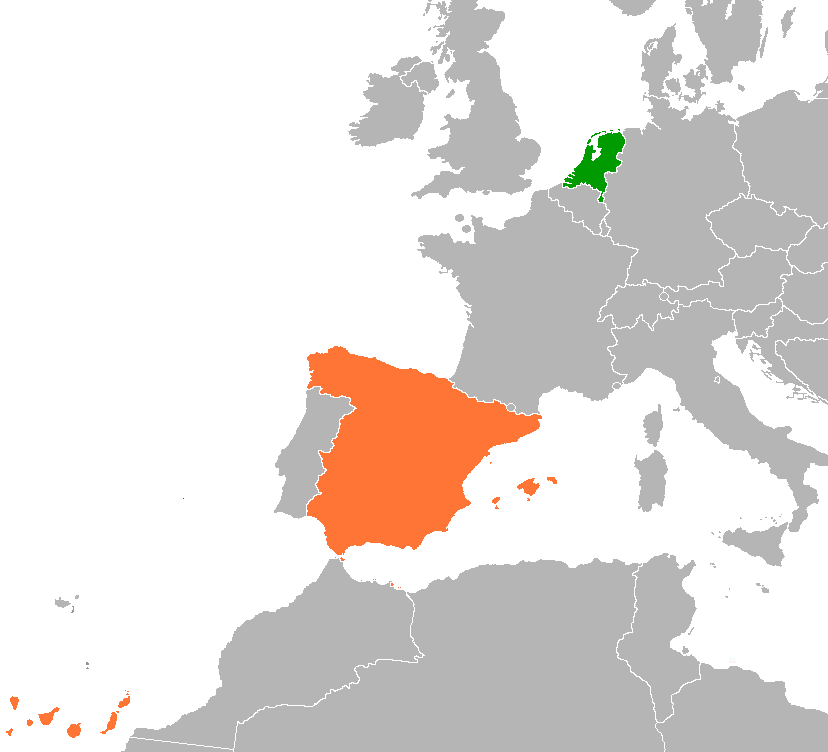
- Netherlands: Spain

Diplomatic mission
- Embassy of the Netherlands, Madrid: Embassy of Spain, The Hague

The Netherlands and Spain maintain bilateral relations. The relations between them are defined mainly by their membership in the European Union and by being allies in the NATO.

== History ==
=== Reign of Carlos I ===
Philip the Handsome, with his marriage to the daughter of Catholic Monarchs and future queen Juana I, made possible the linking of Burgundian territories (including the Netherlands) with the Spaniards.

With his successor, Carlos, future king of Spain and emperor, there was the consolidation and organization of the different territories of the Netherlands within the Hispanic Monarchy.

On a territorial level, in 1521 he conquered the city of Tournai, which joined Flanders, in 1523/1524 after years of war, he was accepted as lord of Friesland (after buying his rights to the Duke Jorge the Bearded of Saxony-Meissen in 1515), in 1528 he bought the bishopric of Utrecht (which included Utrecht and Overijssel) by the Schoonhoven and Gorinchem treaties, in 1536 he conquered Groningen with Ommelanden and Drenthe, and in 1543 the duchy of Gelderland with Zutphen by the treaty of Venlo. With this, he came to dominate almost all of the territories in the region of the Netherlands, with the exception of the Prince-Bishopric of Liège.

=== Reign of Philip II ===
On 25 October 1555, Emperor Charles V resigned from his son Philip the headquarters of the Order of the Golden Fleece, the Duchy of Burgundy and therefore the 17 territories from the Netherlands.

Within the Hispanic monarchy, the Netherlands offered a good economic vitality, with a well-established merchant class. So the attempts to increase taxes to cover wars, the defense of their privileges and the spread of Calvinism created a focus of resistance that led to the general rebellion in the area against Spanish politics.

Union of Utrecht and Union of Arrás (1579).

In 1568, the rebellion in the Netherlands began, which would lead to the Eighty Years War. On 5 January 1579, Catholics formed the Arras Union: provinces of Artois, Hainaut and part of Flanders (Lille, Douai and Orchies). Protestants in contrast constituted 23 January the Utrecht Union: Holland, Zeeland, Utrecht, Gelderland, Groningen, and later cities of Brabant and Flanders.

Before the death of the King of Spain, the territory of the Netherlands, in theory the seventeen provinces, did not pass to his son Philip III, but jointly to his son-in-law Albert and his daughter Isabel Clara Eugenia, as he was part of the dowry, along with the Duchy of Burgundy at his wedding with Archduke Alberto by the Act of Assignment of 6 May 1598, in an attempt by the King to solve the problem generated by the insurrection of the Netherlands by establishing an indigenous branch of the Habsburgs.

=== Reign of Philip III ===
The peace treaties with France (1598) and with England (1604) and the exhaustion by war led to the establishment of the Twelve Years' Truce.

In practice, the northern territories formed the United Provinces: Holland, Zeeland, Utrecht, Gelderland (with Zutphen), Overijssel (with Drenthe), Friesland and Groningen, in addition to the territories of the Generalitat (parts of Brabant, Flanders and Limburg). And the southern territories under the sovereignty of the Habsburgs formed the Spanish Netherlands: Flanders, Artois, Hainaut, Namur, Luxembourg, Brabant, Antwerp, Mechelen, Limburg. This was reflected in the States General of the Netherlands, since in the northern part they settled in The Hague and in the southern part in Brussels.

=== Reign of Philip IV ===
In 1621, Archduke Alberto died without having had descendants, and by the Act of Assignment of 1598, the alleged sovereignty over the 17 provinces (in fact the southern part only), returned to the king of Spain and nephew of Isabel Clara Eugenia, Felipe IV, which coincided with the end of the truce and the beginning of Thirty Years War.

=== Reign of Carlos II ===
- In the Treaty of Aachen (1668), which ended the War of Devolution (1667–1668), Flanders, Bergues, Furnes, Armentières, Courtrai, Douai, Menen, Oudenaarde, Charleroi and Binche).
- In Treaty of Nijmegen (19 September 1678), which ended Franco-Dutch War (1672–1678) seats were ceded in the Netherlands (Cassel, Bailleul, Ypres, Wervick, Warneton, Cambrai, Bouchain, Condé -sur-l'Escaut, Bavay).
- In the Truce of Regensburg (15 August 1684), which interrupted the War of the Reunions motivated by the Meeting chambers, Luxembourg was lost after a war of several months.
- By Rijswijk Treaty (20 September 1697), which concluded Nine Years' War, part of the lost territories was recovered after the previous treaties, such as the squares of Mons, Luxembourg, Kortrijk, Chimay, Charleroi, etc. because the French monarch was interested in his family inheriting all the territories of the Spanish crown.

== Agreements ==
Following the signing of the Memorandum of Understanding on 13 July 2004 in The Hague, bilateral relations and visits increased. In 2008 the Prime Minister Jan Peter Balkenende signed a Joint Declaration in Madrid for the development of the Memorandum of Understanding. It envisaged the intensification of cooperation in immigration, R&D, energy, climate change, terrorism, human rights and intercultural dialogue, and multilateral cooperation (NATO and development cooperation).

== Commerce ==
The Netherlands is one of the main trading partners of Spain, occupying the seventh position in the ranking of countries receiving Spanish exports and reaching an export figure of 6,807 million euro s, 2.9% of the Total exports of Spain in 2013. According to the first estimates provided by the Estacom database, Spanish exports to the Netherlands increased by 2.15% in 2013. As far as imports are concerned, the Netherlands is the sixth largest supplier partner in Spain. The value of goods and services imported from the country to Spain in 2013 amounted to 9,853 million euros. Imports of Dutch products to Spain declined in 2013, and for that period the coverage rate was 69%.

Since 2017, yearly in november, there has been a large Dutch presence at the Barcelona Smart City World Expo. Many companies and (local) governments like initiator Amsterdam Trade & Invest have been and are programming themes like Sustainable Building & Sustainable Mobility with state-of-the-art startup solutions.

== Cultural relations ==
There is great interest in the Netherlands for Spanish culture and language, and culture Spanish and it is reflected in the numerous manifestations of Spanish culture in this country. The Spanish Embassy has a Cultural Department that every year executes a cultural program previously approved by the Ministry of Foreign Affairs. In the field of education, the increase in demand for Spanish as a foreign language in all educational sections, especially in university and higher education, stands out. Special mention also requires the existence of an Instituto Cervantes, based in Utrecht, which organizes numerous cultural promotion and dissemination activities in Spanish.

== European Union and NATO ==
While the Netherlands was one of the founding members of the EU, Spain joined the EU in 1986. While the Netherlands was one of the founding members of NATO, Spain joined NATO in 1982.

== Resident diplomatic missions ==
- The Netherlands has an embassy in Madrid.
- Spain has an embassy in The Hague and a consulate-general in Amsterdam.

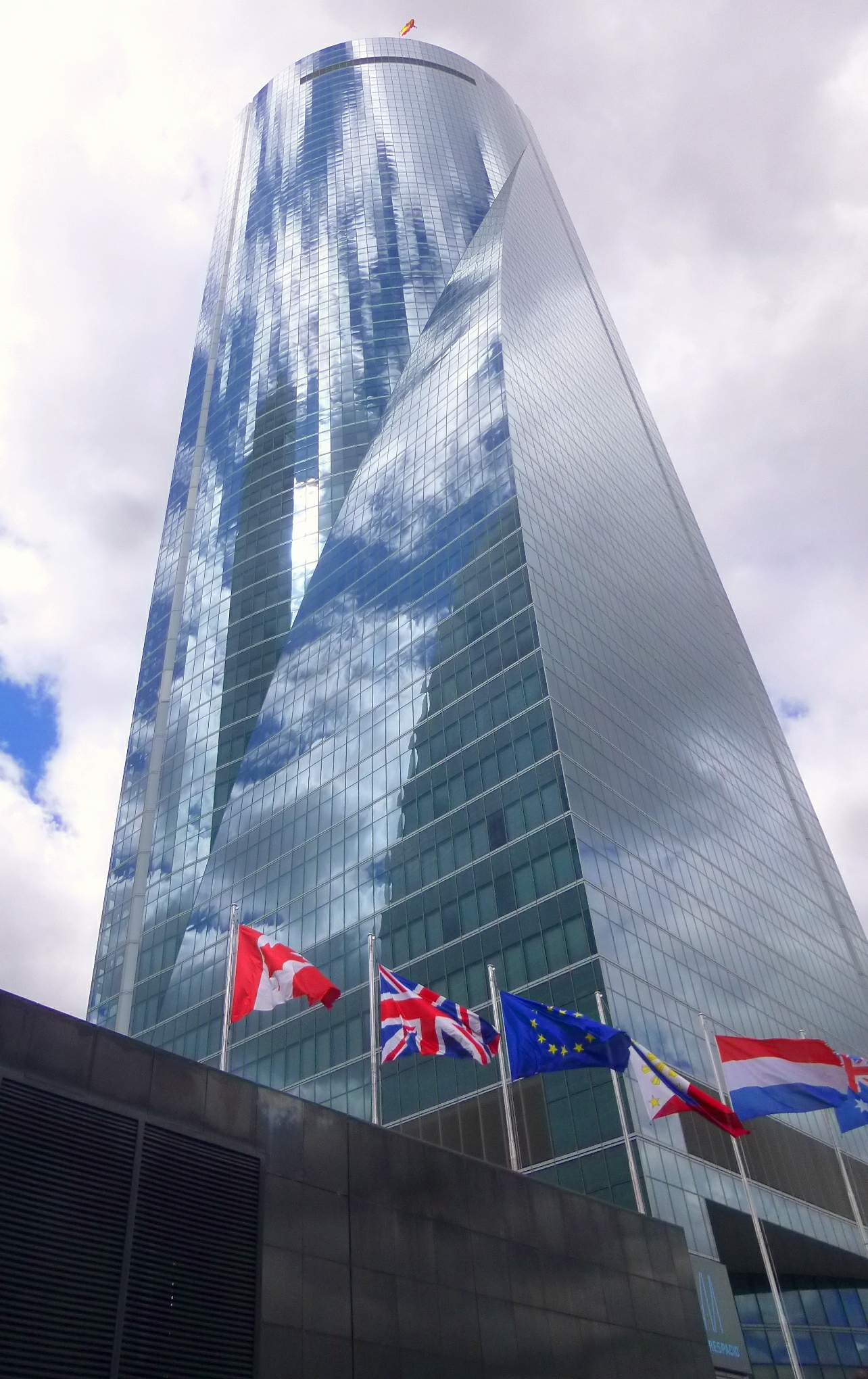
Torre Espacio hosting the Embassy of the Netherlands in Madrid

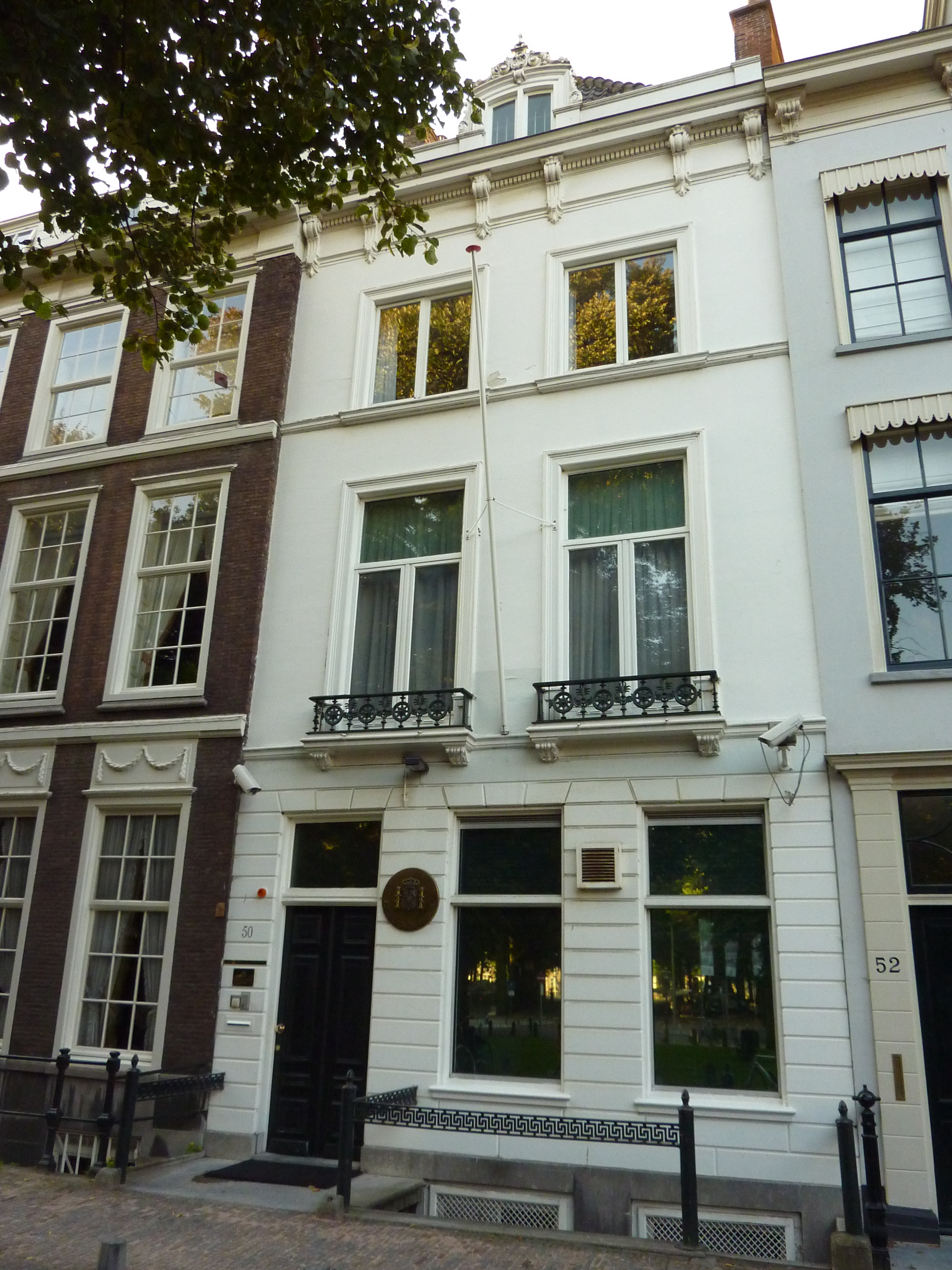
Embassy of Spain in The Hague

== See also ==
- Foreign relations of the Netherlands
- Foreign relations of Spain
- List of ambassadors of Spain to the Netherlands
