= Colombia–Netherlands relations =

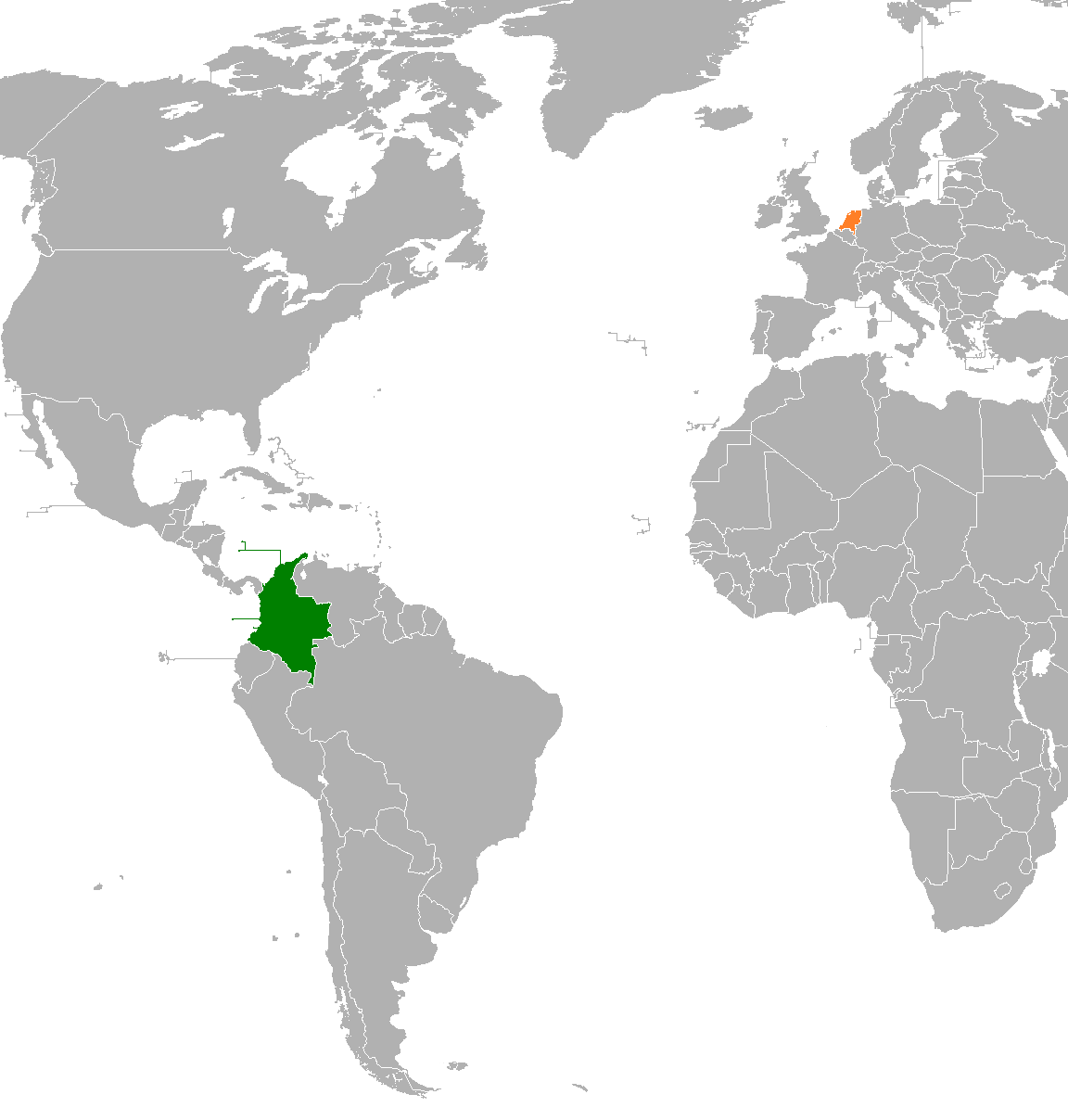
- Colombia: Netherlands

Colombia and the Netherlands maintain bilateral relations. Both nations have had a friendly relationship since the beginning of the 19th century.

== History ==
Colombia and the Netherlands established diplomatic relations in 1829. Unofficially, the relations were born when William I of the Netherlands sought a rapprochement with Simón Bolívar, linked to the Latin American wars of independence and the island of Curaçao.

On 10 February 2014, the Netherlands was accepted as an Observer State of the Pacific Alliance at the VIII Summit held in Cartagena. It is also an Associate Country of the Ibero-American Summit and plays a role in the Association of Caribbean States (ACS), which represents the Dutch territories in the Caribbean.

== High-level visits ==
High-level visits from Colombia to the Netherlands

- Vice President and Foreign Minister Marta Lucía Ramírez (2022)
- President Iván Duque Márquez (2022)
- Foreign Minister Álvaro Leyva Durán (2022)

High-level visits from the Netherlands to Colombia

- Prime Minister Mark Rutte (2018)
- Deputy Minister of Foreign Affairs Thijs van der Plas (2022)

== Bilateral agreements ==
Both nations have signed several bilateral agreements such as a Memorandum of Understanding for the authorization of spouses of diplomatic officials to exercise remunerated activity in the receiving state (2004); Air Services Agreement (2014); Air Transport Agreement with respect to Aruba (2018); Agreement to avoid double taxation (2022); Circular Economy Memorandum of Understanding (2022) and a Memorandum of Understanding Colombia-Dutch Partnership for Water (2022).

== Economic relations ==
Colombia exported products worth 1,215,053 thousand dollars, the main products being petroleum, coal and agro-industrial products, while The Netherlands exported products worth 266,755 thousand dollars, the main products being chemical products, machinery and agro-industrial products.

In 2009, the Netherlands exported services to Colombia worth $155M, with Services not allocated ($155M) being the largest in connection with value. In 2022, the Netherlands exported $782M to Colombia. The products exported from the Netherlands to Colombia included Refined Petroleum ($99.2M), Packaged Medicaments ($67.9M), and Medical Instruments ($52.3M). Colombia exported $3.67B to the Netherlands. The products exported from Colombia exported to the Netherlands were Coal Briquettes ($2.75B), Refined Petroleum ($139M), and Ferroalloys ($129M).

In January 2024, Colombia strengthened its commercial ties with the Netherlands and the Dutch Caribbean. Colombian exports to this region reach a significant value of 1,738 million dollars.

== Diplomatic missions ==
- Colombia has an embassy in The Hague, a consulates-general in Amsterdam, and consulates in Oranjestad (Aruba) and in Willemstad (Curaçao).
- Netherlands has an embassy in Bogotá.
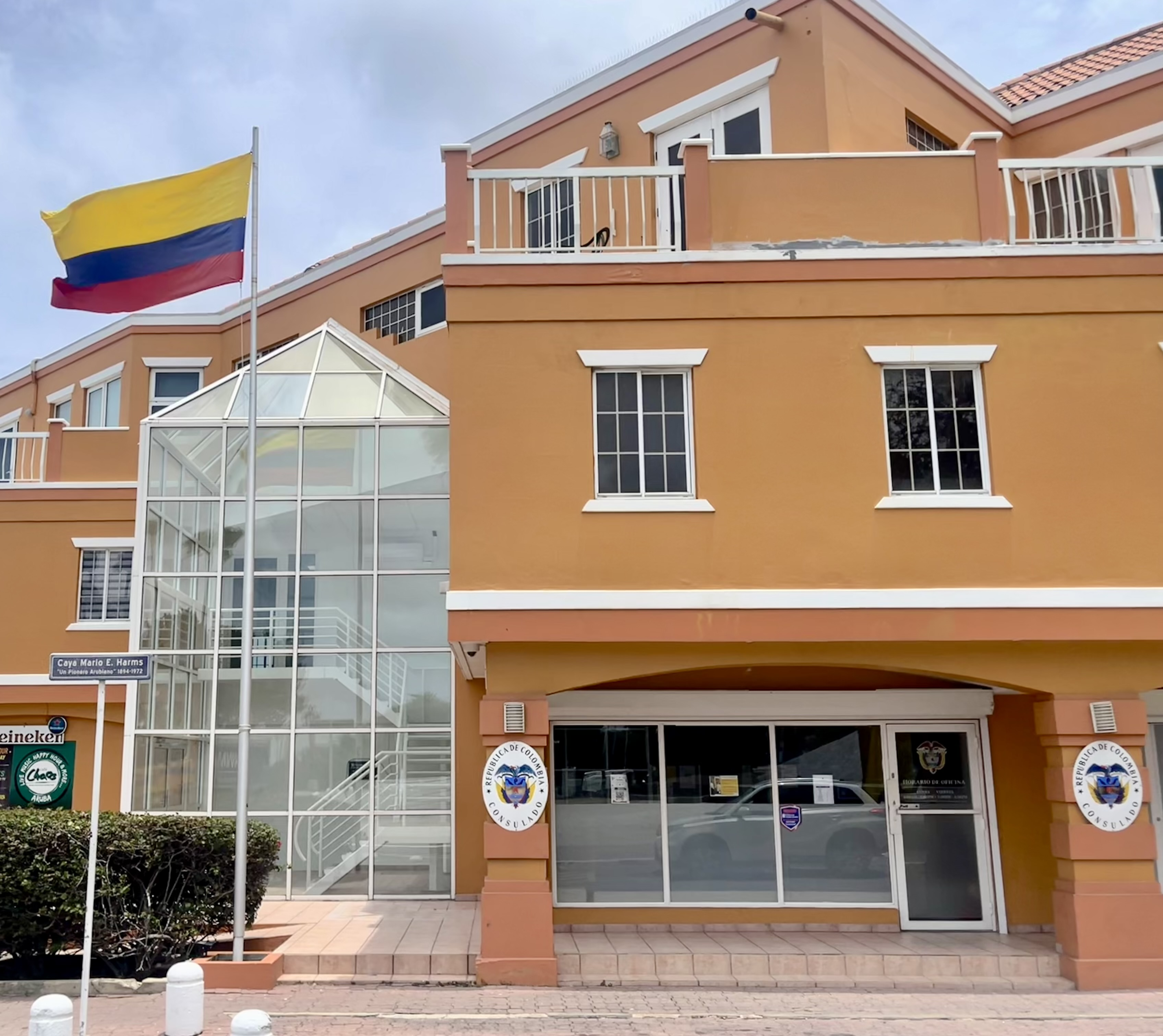
Consulate of Colombia in Oranjestad

== See also ==
- Foreign relations of Colombia
- Foreign relations of the Netherlands
