= Luxembourg–Netherlands relations =

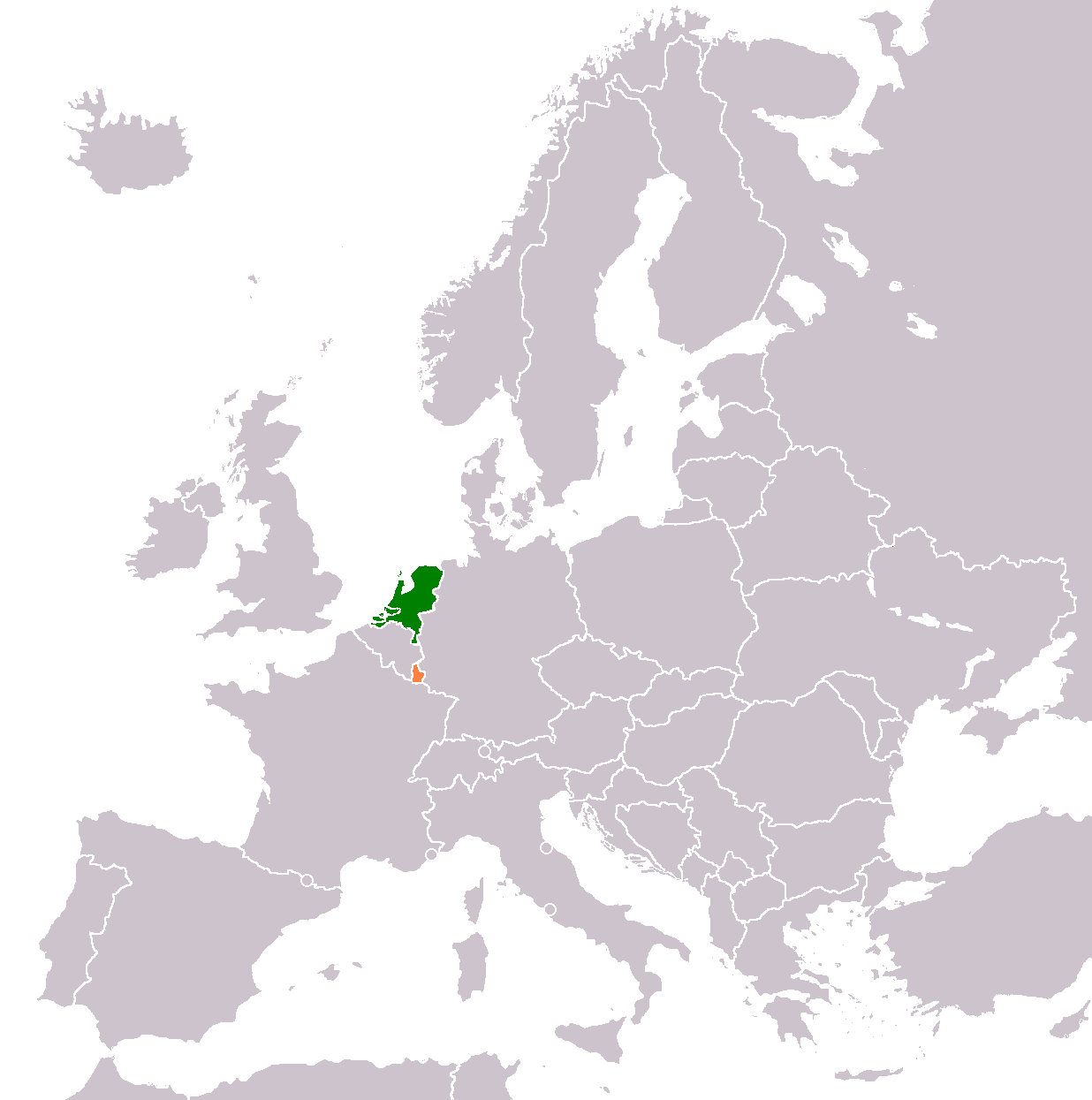

- Netherlands: Luxembourg

Diplomatic mission
- Embassy of Luxembourg, The Hague: Embassy of the Netherlands, Luxembourg

Luxembourg–Netherlands relations are relations between the Grand Duchy of Luxembourg and the Kingdom of the Netherlands. Today, the two neighboring countries enjoy close and friendly relations. Luxembourg and the Netherlands were linked by a personal union between 1815 and 1890 and shared the same head of state. In the 20th century, both countries became core areas of European integration and were among the founding members of the European Coal and Steel Community, the forerunner of the later European Union. Luxembourg has an embassy in The Hague. the Netherlands has an embassy in Luxembourg City. Both countries are members of the Council of Europe, the European Union and NATO.

== History ==
=== Early relations ===
Luxembourg and the territory of the present-day Netherlands were often under joint rule in the late Middle Ages and early modern period. In 1443, the Duchy of Luxembourg became part of the Burgundian Netherlands and subsequently shared the fate of the Habsburg Netherlands for centuries. After the northern provinces broke away to form the independent Republic of the United Netherlands (1648), Luxembourg remained part of the Spanish Netherlands and later the Austrian Netherlands. Due to its strategic location, Luxembourg was heavily fortified during this period (“Gibraltar of the North”) and was contested between the great powers. During the French Revolutionary Wars, Luxembourg was conquered by France in 1795 and incorporated into French territory as the Département Forêts. After the fall of Napoleon, the major powers decided at the Congress of Vienna in 1815 to formally reorganize Luxembourg as an independent grand duchy and assign it in personal union to the newly created United Kingdom of the Netherlands, which comprised the entire Benelux region. At the same time, Luxembourg also joined the German Confederation and Prussian troops were stationed in the country.

=== Personal union ===
At the Congress of Vienna in 1815, the Grand Duchy of Luxembourg was placed under the personal union of the Dutch King William I of Orange-Nassau. In the years that followed, Luxembourg was initially administered largely as a Dutch province; However, after the Belgian Revolution of 1830 and the division of Luxembourg in the Treaty of London of 1839, it was given its own administration and constitution, but remained dynastically linked to the Dutch crown. Economically, the now semi-autonomous Grand Duchy oriented itself more towards the German Confederation: in 1842, at the instigation of King William II, Luxembourg joined the German Customs Union. With the coup of 1856 in Luxembourg, the Dutch king William III expanded his power in Luxembourg and destroyed the achievements of the liberal constitution of 1848. In the 1860s, the so-called Luxembourg Crisis almost led to war, but was settled by the London Conference of 1867: Luxembourg's still controversial status was secured by its formal neutralization and the demolition of the Fortress of Luxembourg. With the death of William III in 1890, the personal union came to an end; Adolph of Nassau-Weilburg became Grand Duke, giving Luxembourg its own dynasty.

=== World wars and relations after 1945 ===
The Netherlands remained neutral during the First World War, while Luxembourg was occupied by the German Empire in 1914 and remained under German control until the end of the war, despite protests from Luxembourg. In the Second World War, both countries were invaded and occupied by the German Wehrmacht on 10 May 1940. The shared experience of war subsequently fostered a desire for cooperation between the two countries: as early as 1944, the governments-in-exile of Luxembourg, the Netherlands, and Belgium signed a convention in London establishing a customs union (Benelux), which came into force in 1948. Luxembourg and the Netherlands were among the six founding members of the European Coal and Steel Community in 1957 and also participated in the founding of NATO (1949) and other post-war international organizations. The Benelux Treaty of 1960 created a complete economic union between the three Benelux countries. This close trilateral cooperation proved to be a precursor to European unification – achievements such as freedom of movement (Schengen Agreement) and the common internal market were first tested within the Benelux framework and later implemented in the European Community. Both countries have been members of the European Union since 1993 and both introduced the Euro as their currency in 2002. To this day, both countries coordinate their policies closely and are considered reliable partners within the EU and NATO.

== Economic relations ==
Economic relations between Luxembourg and the Netherlands are traditionally close and benefit from open borders within the Benelux region and the shared EU single market. The Netherlands is one of the Grand Duchy's most important trading partners: in 2022, it ranked fourth in terms of both Luxembourg's export markets and sources of imports.Overall, bilateral trade volume is in the billions—in 2023 alone, the Netherlands exported goods worth around €2.4 billion to Luxembourg. Both countries are founding members of the eurozone, which eliminates currency risks in mutual trade. In addition, the Netherlands and Luxembourg are considered attractive business locations and important hubs for international investment in Europe.

== Cultural relations ==
The historical ties between Luxembourg and the Netherlands are also reflected in cultural relations. Many Luxembourgers are aware of the dynastic ties to the House of Orange-Nassau, from which both ruling houses descend. There is a lively exchange between the populations: many Luxembourgers travel regularly to the Netherlands – for example to Amsterdam, Maastricht, or the coast of Zeeland – and conversely, there is an active Dutch community in Luxembourg. Both countries also promote educational and youth exchanges, with many Luxembourg students completing their higher education in the Netherlands. There are also many points of contact in art and literature. Regular official visits at the highest level and joint initiatives within the framework of Benelux cooperation underscore the continuing close cultural ties between the two countries.

== Resident diplomatic missions ==
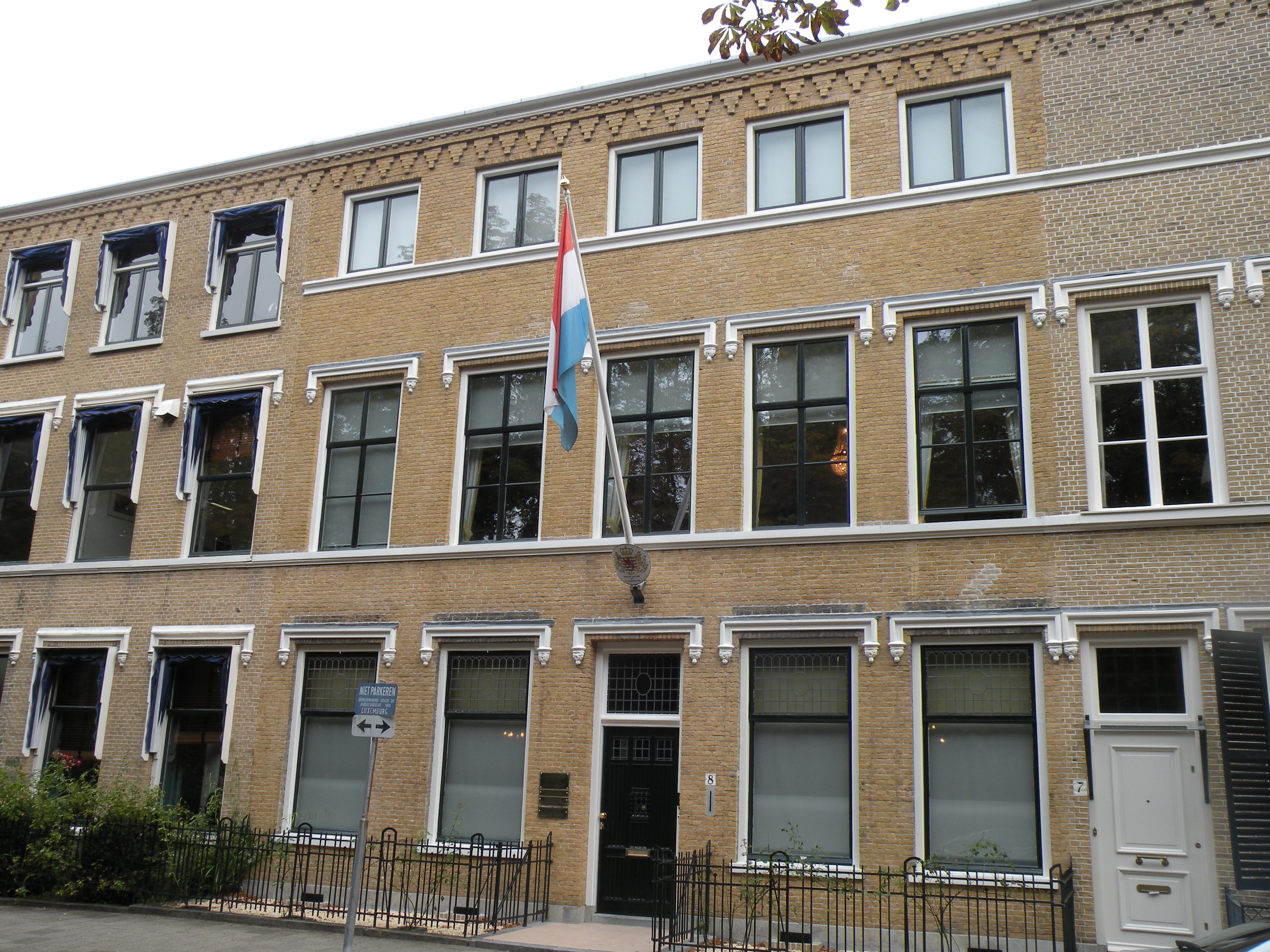
Embassy of Luxembourg in The Hague

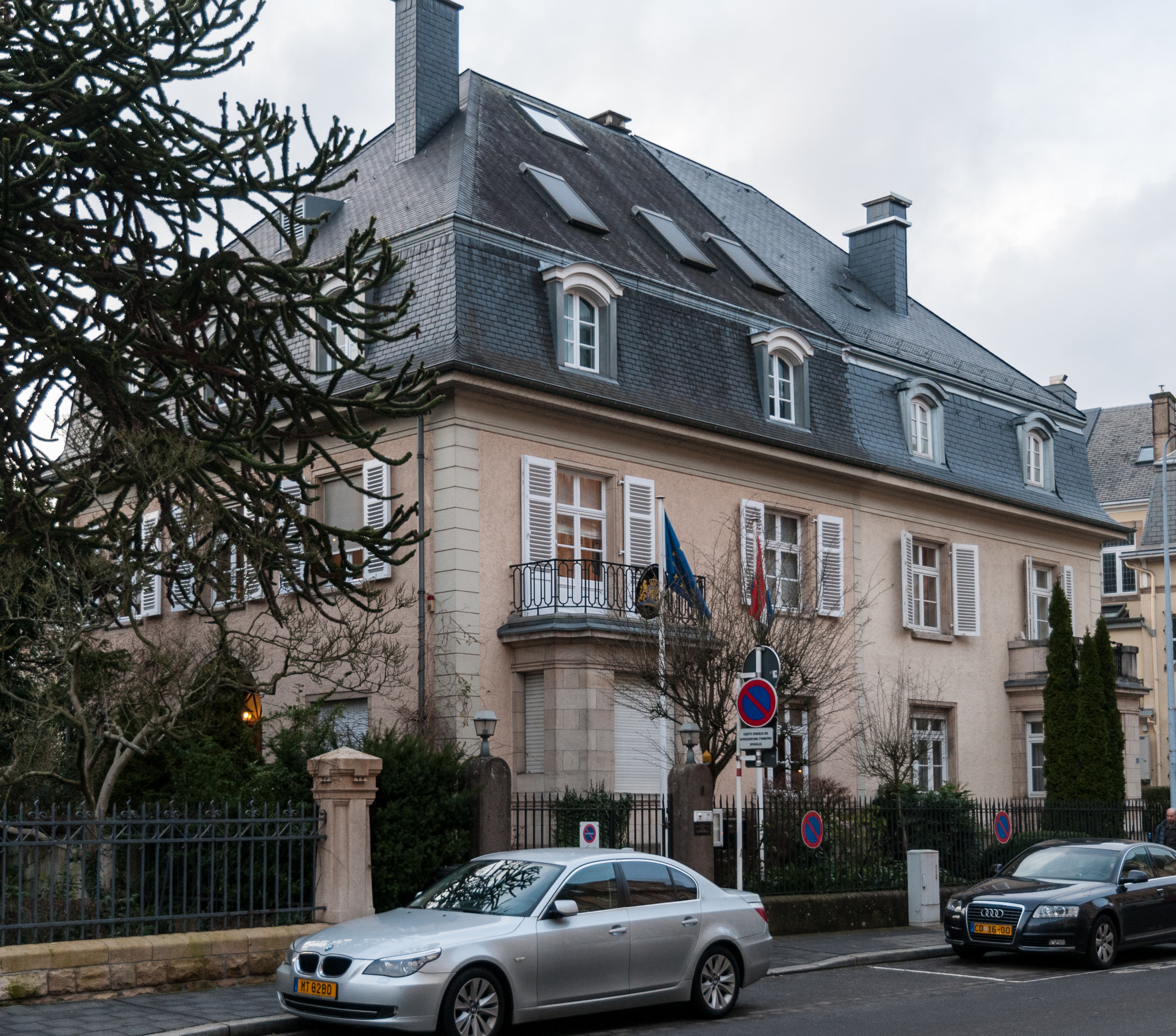
Embassy of the Netherlands in Luxembourg City

- Luxembourg has an embassy in The Hague.
- The Netherlands has an embassy in Luxembourg City.

== See also ==
- Foreign relations of Luxembourg
- Foreign relations of the Netherlands
