= Malaysia–Netherlands relations =

- Malaysia: Netherlands

Malaysia–Netherlands relations refers to interstate relations of Malaysia and the Netherlands. Netherlands has an embassy in Kuala Lumpur, and Malaysia has an embassy in The Hague.

== History ==
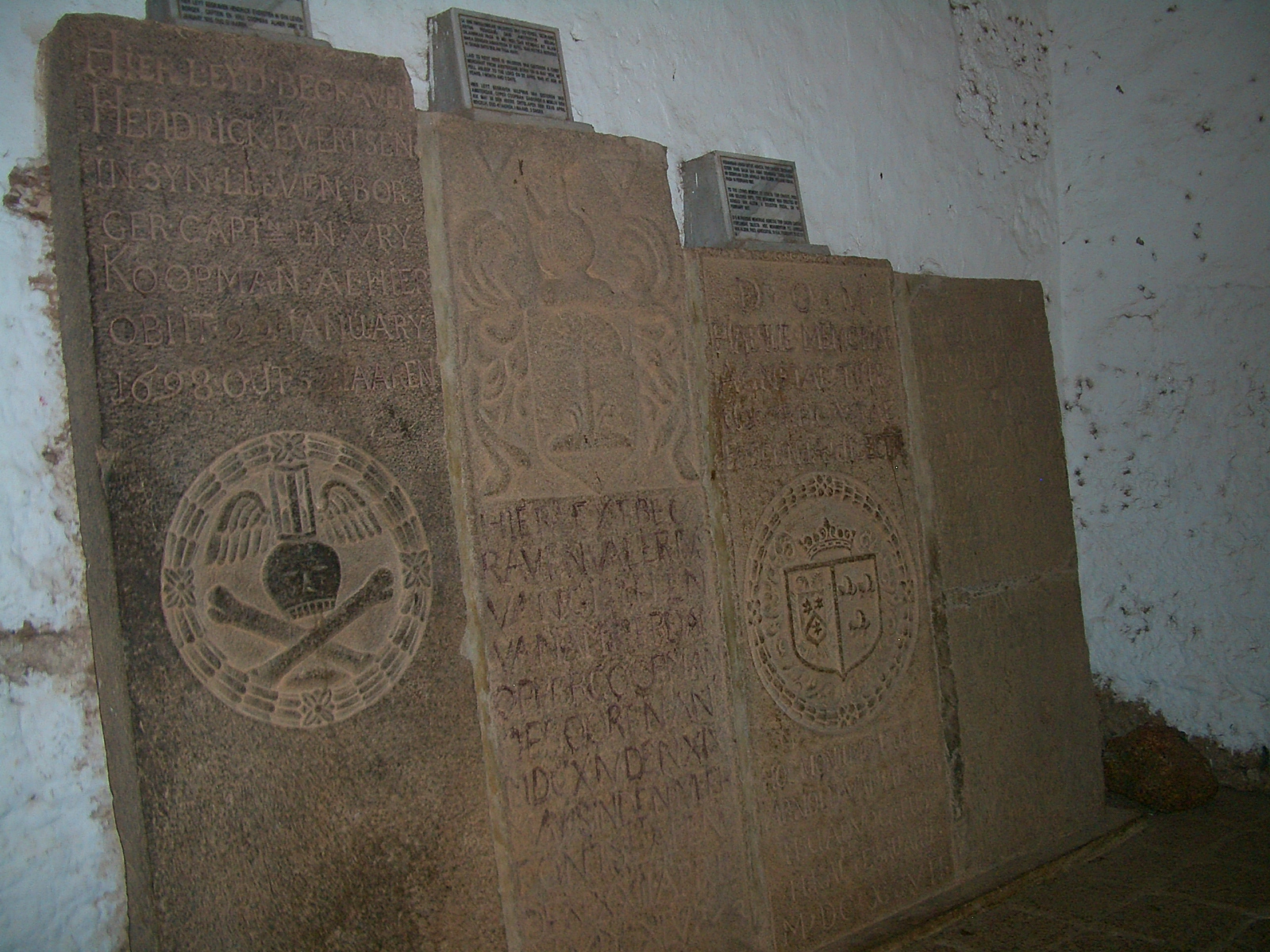
Graves of Dutch dignitaries in Malacca's ruined St Paul's Church.

The Dutch arrived in the Malay Peninsula as early as 1602 on a trading mission to control the lucrative spice trade from the Malay Archipelago. The Dutch then established relations with the Sultanate of Johor in the early 17th century, and in 1641 they captured the Portuguese colony of Malacca (on the south-eastern coast of today's Peninsular Malaysia). With a long interruption during the Napoleonic Wars, the Dutch Malacca era lasted until 1824. A small Dutch-Malaysian Eurasian community, descended from the Dutch settlers in Malacca, persists to these days. In the 20th century, the Netherlands established diplomatic relations with Malaysia soon after the Asian state became independent. The erudite Dutch Sinologist and author Robert van Gulik (who was raised in the former Dutch East Indies himself) served as the ambassador of the Netherlands in Kuala Lumpur in the early 1960s. During his diplomatic service there he became closely acquainted with Malaysia's gibbons (he kept a few in his ambassadorial residence) and became sufficiently interested in this ape species to start the study of its role in ancient Chinese culture, the results of which he later published in his last book (Gibbon in China).

On 3 December 1996, Malaysian Prime Minister Mahathir Mohamad left to attend the Global Panel Conference at The Hague ahead of a two-day official visit to the Netherlands. A Memorandum of Understanding (MOU) was signed between a Malaysian company and a Dutch engineering company for a turnkey project to reclaim about 364ha of land in Mersing, Johor.

On 25 September 2019, Mahathir Mohamad held a bilateral meeting with Dutch Prime Minister Mark Rutte on the sidelines of the 74th Session of the United Nations General Assembly.

== Economic relations ==
Some Dutch origin companies such as Dutch Lady Milk Industries Berhad (subsidiary) and Royal Dutch Shell had their long presence in Malaysia. In 2017, more Dutch investors began showing their interest to invest in Malaysia with two Dutch small and medium-sized enterprises (SMEs) of semiconductor industries shared their overall positive experiences. There is also a Malaysian Dutch Business Council.

KLM currently operate direct flights between Amsterdam and Kuala Lumpur

== Diplomatic missions ==
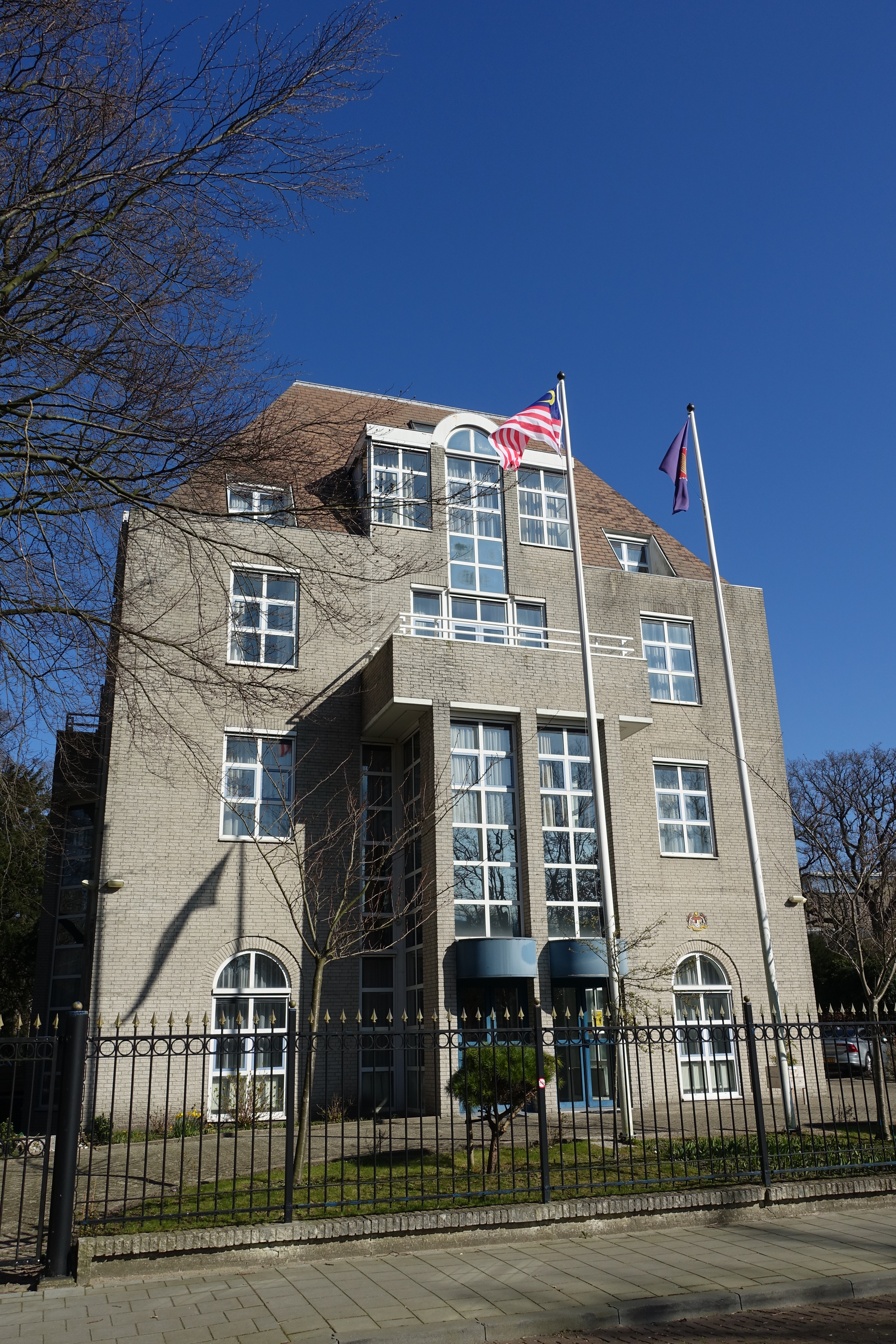
Embassy of Malaysia in The Hague

Federation of Malaysia

- The Hague (Embassy)

Kingdom of the Netherlands

- Kuala Lumpur (Embassy)

In addition to the Chancery building in Rustenburgweg of the Malaysian embassy, there are three Malaysian agencies which operate as part of the Embassy:

- The Malaysia External Trade Development Corporation (MATRADE), located in Rotterdam
- Culture / Tourism Office, located in the city centre in The Hague
- Agriculture Office, located in Rotterdam.

== See also ==
- Foreign relations of Malaysia
- Foreign relations of the Netherlands
