= Bangladesh–Netherlands relations =

- Bangladesh: Netherlands

Bangladesh–Netherlands relations refer to the bilateral relations between Bangladesh and Netherlands.

== History ==
=== Pre-1971 ===
From 1615 onwards, the Dutch East India Company traded with the Bengal Subah of the Mughal Empire. They set up trading posts across the cities and ports of Dacca, Sherpur and Rajshahi. After the company's liquidation, Bengal became a colony of the Kingdom of the Netherlands until 1825, when it was relinquished to the British according to the Anglo-Dutch Treaty of 1824.

=== Post-1971 ===
Bangladesh and the Netherlands established diplomatic relations in 1971 after the Independence of Bangladesh. The Netherlands has supported Bangladesh through providing financial and technical aid to water resources and coastal management projects in Bangladesh. Both the countries are delta regions, Netherlands experience with coastal management was useful for coastal management of Bangladesh. In 1976 Netherlands supported the Delta Development Project. Bangladesh has a resident ambassador in the Netherlands. The Netherlands has a resident ambassador in Bangladesh and an embassy.

== Economic relations ==
Bangladesh's largest export to the Netherlands is textiles with 85% share of the total exports. The next largest export commodity is frozen foods. In 2016 the Dutch Bangla Chamber of Commerce and Industry organized the Dutch-Bangla EXPO 2016 in Amsterdam. The Netherlands is one of the largest source of foreign investment in Bangladesh. There are 70 Dutch companies operating in Bangladesh.

== Resident diplomatic missions ==
- Bangladesh has an embassy in The Hague.
- The Netherlands has an embassy in Dhaka.
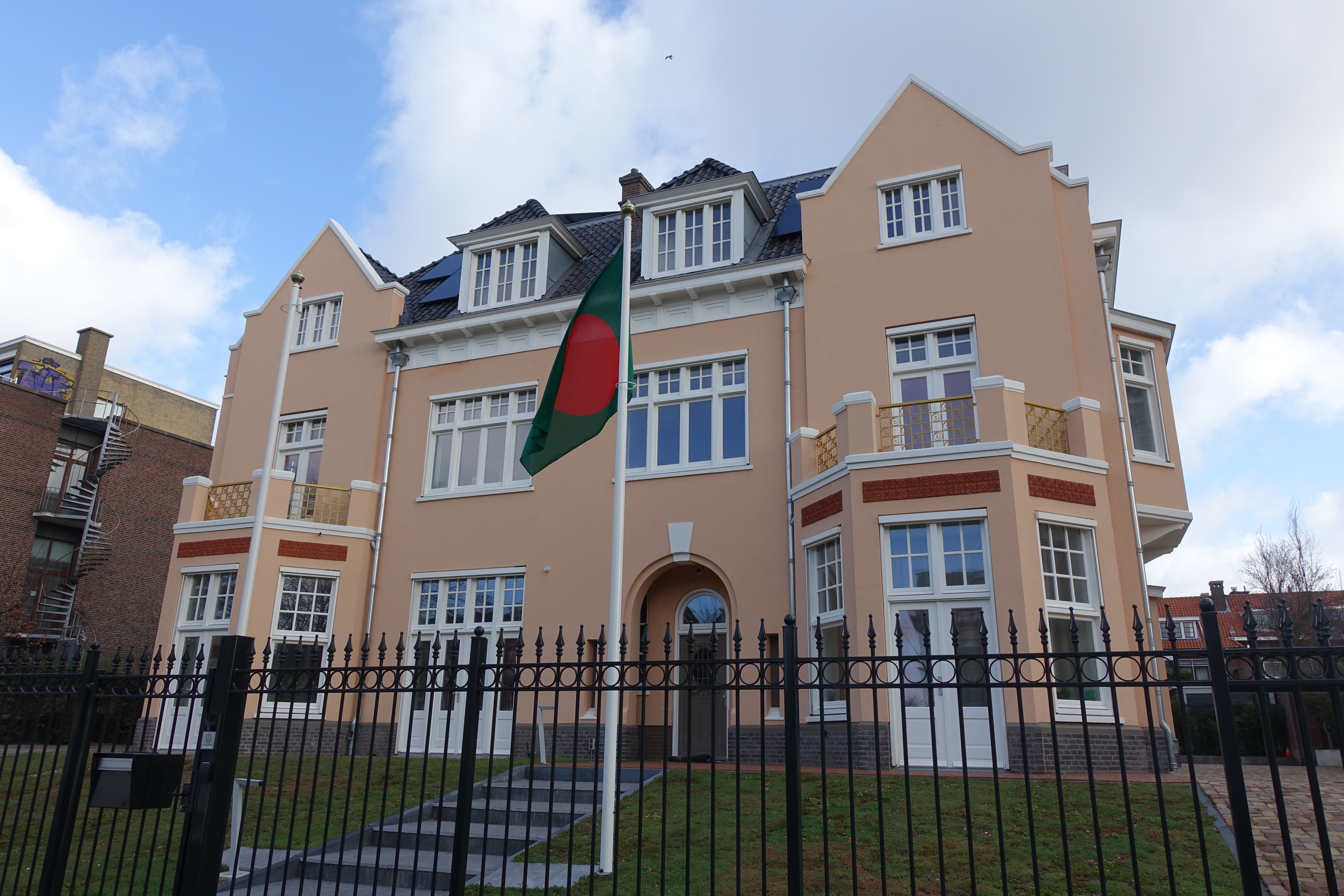
Embassy of Bangladesh in The Hague

== See also ==
- Foreign relations of Bangladesh
- Foreign relations of the Netherlands
