= Italy–Netherlands relations =

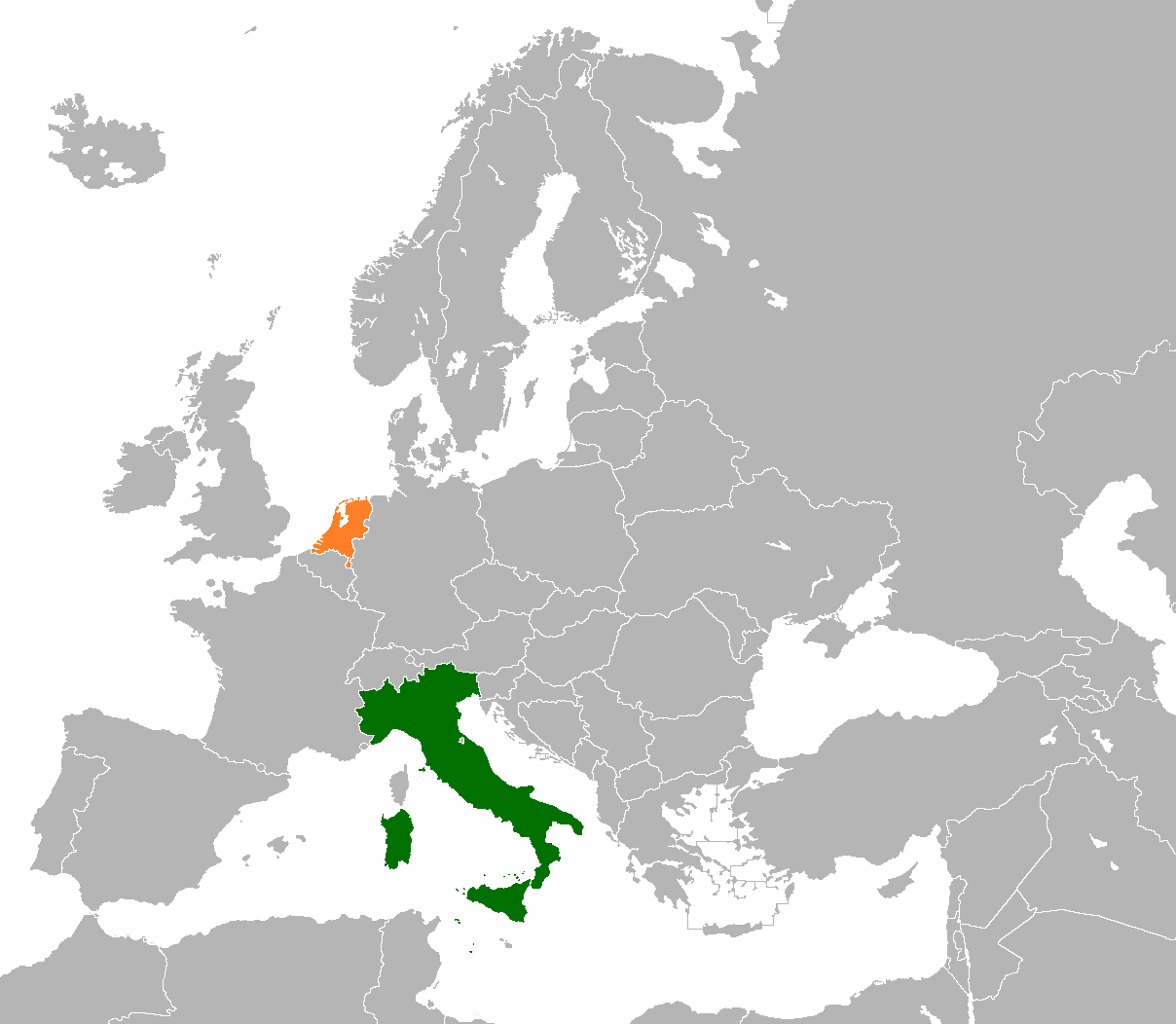
- Italy: Netherlands

Diplomatic mission
- Embassy of Italy, The Hague: Embassy of the Netherlands, Rome

Italy has an embassy in The Hague and an Italian Cultural Institute in Amsterdam. The Netherlands has an embassy in Rome and a consulate general in Milan.

Both countries are full and founding members of the European Union, the North Atlantic Treaty Organization and the Organization for Economic Co-operation and Development.

Italy and the Netherlands have maintained friendly relations, with a joint statement between the Italian Minister of Enterprises, Adolfo Urso, and the Dutch Minister of Economic affairs, Dirk Beljaarts, reaffirming this message. In the future, Italy and the Netherlands hope to increase their economic and political cooperation.

== Trade ==
There was slightly over €48 billion Euros (about $50 billion USD) in trade between the two nations in 2023. Italy exported approximately €19 billion Euros ($19.7 billion USD) worth of trade to the Netherlands. Italy’s largest exports to the Netherlands are vaccines, blood, antisera, and toxins, which combined make up a total of 13.3% of Italy’s exports to the Netherlands. The Netherlands’ largest exports to Italy are computers (4.3%), broadcasting equipment (4.15%), packaged medicaments (3.88%), and petroleum gas (3.23%).

== Resident diplomatic missions ==
- Italy has an embassy in The Hague.
- The Netherlands has an embassy in Rome and a consulate-general in Milan.
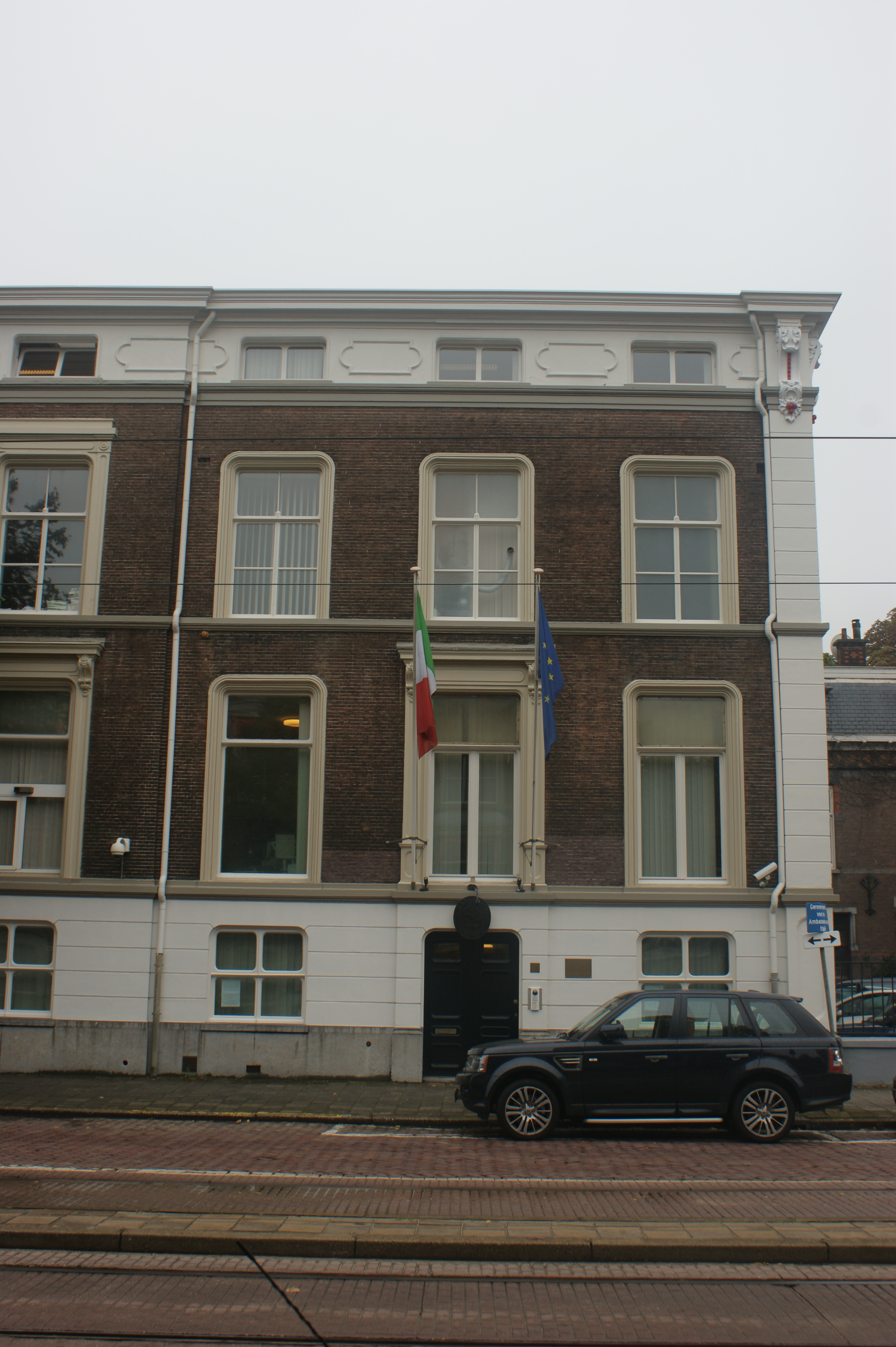
Embassy of Italy in The Hague

== See also ==
- Foreign relations of Italy
- Foreign relations of the Netherlands
