= Foreign relations of Curaçao =

The Foreign relations of Curaçao are handled by the Kingdom of the Netherlands. Curaçao is a constituent country within the Kingdom, and subject to the Charter for the Kingdom of the Netherlands. Curaçao is responsible for their own government, education and laws, however foreign relations are handled by the Kingdom.

The Minister Plenipotentiary of Curaçao is a member of the Council of Ministers of the Kingdom of the Netherlands. The council meets at least once a month to discuss matters concerning the Kingdom which include foreign relations.

Curaçao is an observer at CARICOM and applied for associate membership in 2018.

== Consulates-General in Curaçao ==
The following countries have a consulate in Willemstad, Curaçao:

- China
- Colombia
- Dominican Republic
- Germany
- Haiti
- Russia
- Suriname
- United Kingdom
- United States
- Venezuela

== See also ==
- Visa policy of the Kingdom of the Netherlands in the Caribbean
