= Embassy of the Netherlands, Bangkok =

- Address: 206 Wireless Road, Bangkok, Thailand
- Ambassador: Remco Johannes van Wijngaarden

The Embassy of the Kingdom of the Netherlands in Bangkok (Thai: สถานเอกอัครราชทูตเนเธอร์แลนด์ ประจำประเทศไทย) is the Netherlands's primary diplomatic mission in Thailand. The embassy is located at 206 Wireless Road, between the United States Embassy and Residence of the United States Ambassador. The embassy complex includes a heritage villa recognized by the Association of Siamese Architects.

The Embassy has sponsored a variety of sustainable transportation initiatives in Bangkok, including expanding cycling infrastructure and adoptive electric vehicles.

The current Ambassador is Remco Johannes van Wijngaarden.

== History ==
=== Property sale ===
In 2025, the Dutch Ministry of Foreign Affairs announced plans to sale the embassy compound.

On 19 March 2026, Ambassador van Wijngaarden announced the embassy would move to Dusit Central Park in August 2026.

==== Reactions ====
The proposed sale was opposed by the Dutch Association in Thailand. On 30 July 2025, the Association delivering a petition against the sale of over 1,000 signatures to Remco van Wijngaarden, Ambassador of the Netherlands to Thailand.

The embassy's sale was criticized by environmentalist Thunpicha Greigarn, writing in a Bangkok Post editorial that the embassy site "will most likely become another layer of grey expansion, because that is the path of least resistance."
