= Netherlands–Serbia relations =

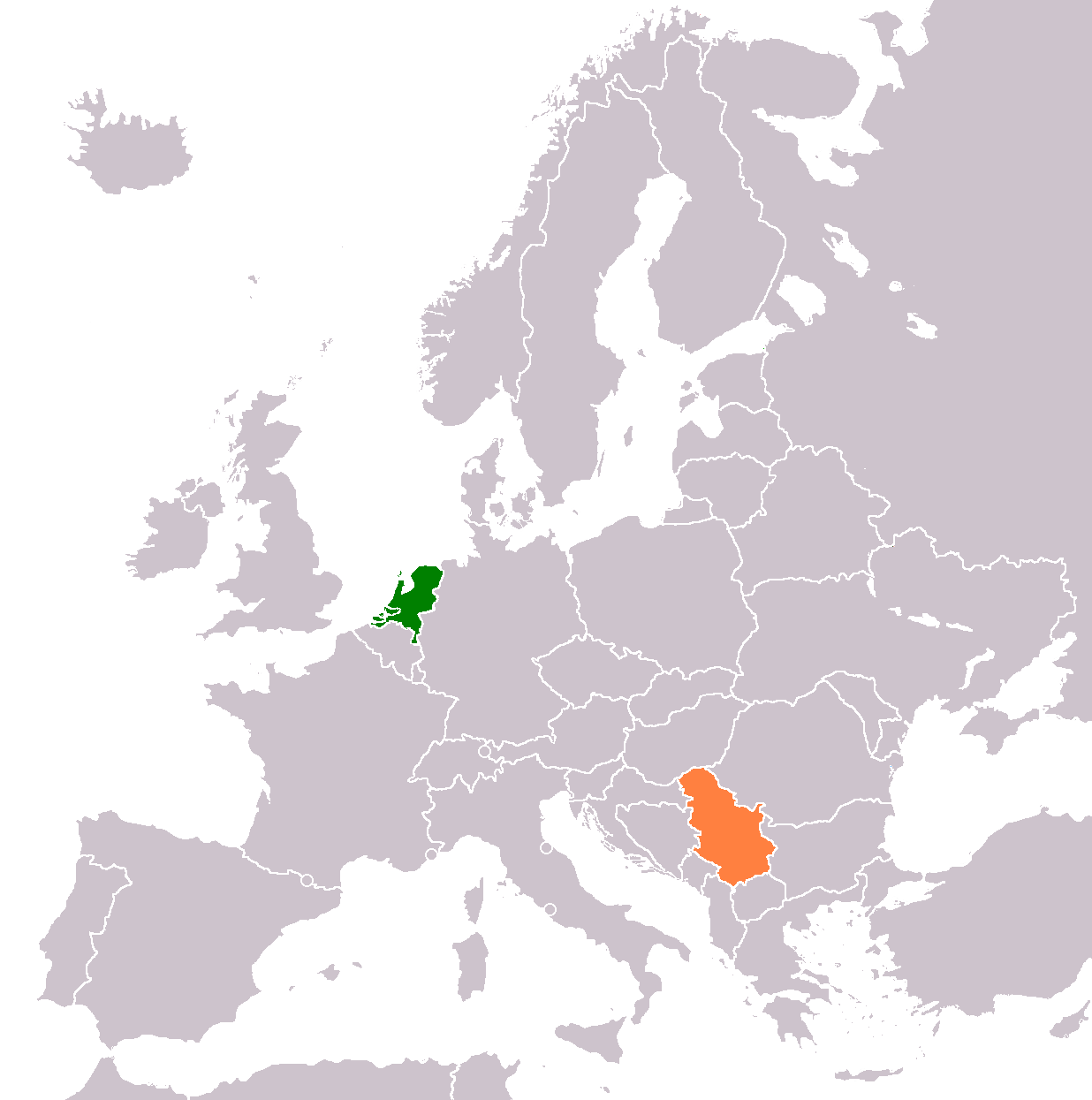
- Netherlands: Serbia

The Netherlands and Serbia maintain diplomatic relations established in 1891. From 1918 to 2006, the Netherlands maintained relations with the Kingdom of Yugoslavia, the Socialist Federal Republic of Yugoslavia (SFRY), and the Federal Republic of Yugoslavia (FRY) (later Serbia and Montenegro), of which Serbia is considered shared (SFRY) or sole (FRY) legal successor. The Netherlands is an EU member and Serbia is an EU candidate.

== Economic relations ==
Trade between two countries amounted to $1.2 billion in 2023; Dutch merchandise exports to Serbia were standing at roughly $789 million; Serbia's export to the Netherlands were about $449 million.

Major Dutch company present in Serbia is Heineken (owner of the Zaječar Brewery in Zaječar and the Novi Sad Brewery in Novi Sad) and Ahold Delhaize (owner of Maxi, country's largest supermarket chain).

== Immigration from Serbia ==
According to data from 2024, there were 20,297 people of Serb ethnic descent or Serbian nationality in the Netherlands, out of which 11 817 were Serbia-born.

== Resident diplomatic missions ==
- Netherlands has an embassy in Belgrade.
- Serbia has an embassy in The Hague.
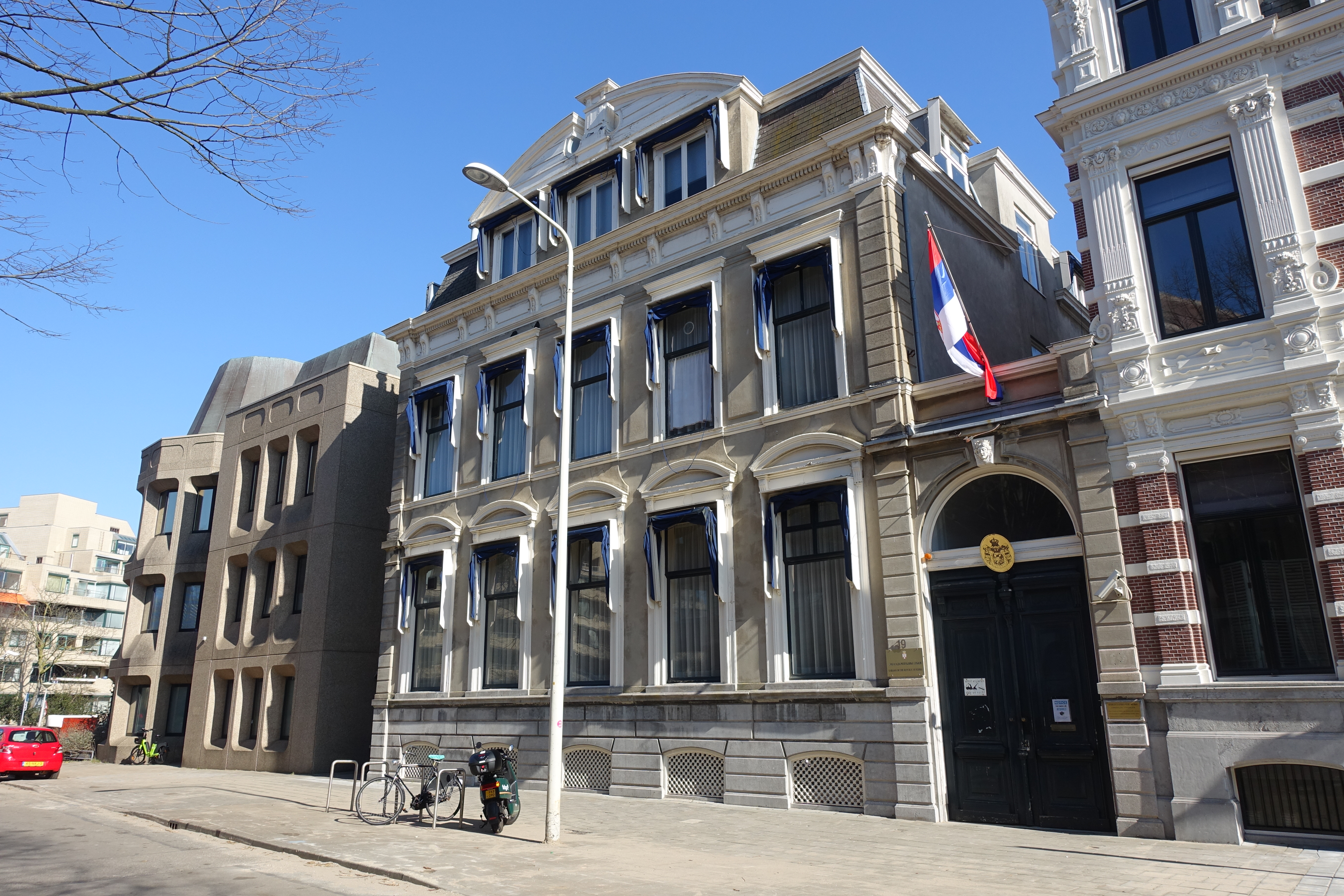
Embassy of Serbia in The Hague

== See also ==
- Foreign relations of the Netherlands
- Foreign relations of Serbia
