= Embassy of Sweden, The Hague =

Diplomatic mission of Sweden in The Hague from 1614

- Location: The Hague
- Address: Johan de Wittlaan 7, 2517 JR, The Hague
- Coordinates: 52.09315°N 4.28487°E
- Opening: 1614
- Ambassador: Julius Liljeström
- Jurisdiction: Netherlands
- Website: Official website

The Embassy of Sweden, The Hague is the diplomatic mission of Sweden in The Hague. The Netherlands is the first country with which Sweden exchanged permanent ambassadors, a relationship established in 1614. The embassy's primary role is to monitor, represent, and advance Swedish interests within the Netherlands and international organizations based in The Hague. Its responsibilities include providing services to Swedish authorities, businesses, organizations, and citizens. The embassy regularly reports to the Ministry for Foreign Affairs in Stockholm, offering insights into political and economic developments, as well as the country's stance on global events. A key focus is promoting Swedish economic interests by aiding Swedish companies and attracting foreign investments to Sweden, collaborating closely with Business Sweden in The Hague and the Swedish Chamber of Commerce in Amsterdam. Additionally, the embassy handles consular matters. It also engages in promoting Sweden through seminars, exhibitions, and cultural events.

== History ==
=== 1614–1869 ===
During the 17th century, Sweden established its first permanent embassies, although temporary diplomatic assignments had been common prior to this period. The inaugural permanent embassy was established in The Hague during the reign of Gustav II Adolf. The choice of the Netherlands was logical, given the significant importance of the bilateral relations to Sweden's foreign policy. In April 1614, a peace and friendship treaty was ratified between Sweden and the Netherlands, stipulating, among other provisions, the exchange of ambassadors. Jacob van Dijck (1567–1631), a seasoned diplomat with Dutch roots who had participated in the negotiations leading to the treaty, was appointed as Sweden's first ambassador to the Netherlands. Van Dyk's primary objective as ambassador was to negotiate loans essential for Sweden's payment of the Älvsborg Ransom. Following the Treaty of Knäred in 1613, Sweden had incurred substantial debts to Denmark to regain control of the Älvsborg Castle. Additionally, funds were required to support Sweden's military campaign in Poland during that period. van Dijck successfully secured Dutch loans, but encountered difficulties during the repayment process, leading to his recall by Gustav II Adolf in 1620.

Nils Gyldenstolpe's familiarity with European, particularly Dutch, affairs was a key factor in his appointment as the Swedish envoy to The Hague in 1679. The Hague, known as a hub of European politics, held significant importance in Swedish diplomacy during that period. Gyldenstolpe's tenure in The Hague coincided with a pivotal shift in Swedish foreign policy towards an anti-French stance, spearheaded by the new President of the Court of Chancery Bengt Gabrielsson Oxenstierna. In 1681, Gyldenstolpe played a pivotal role in cementing this shift by negotiating the crucial guarantee treaty between Sweden and Holland, later joined by the Emperor and Spain. Additionally, he contributed to the formulation of a specialized convention in 1683, which further delineated the provisions of the guarantee treaty. In 1686, Gyldenstolpe facilitated the renewal of alliances and trade pacts between Sweden and Holland.

During his time as envoy in The Hague in the 1680s and 1690s, Nils Lillieroot faced many challenges. Swedish foreign policy shifted from an alliance with France to siding with France's adversaries, forcing him into sham negotiations in Paris. He strongly advocated for continuing the alliance with France, but when he was transferred to The Hague in 1691, he adapted to the new policy. In The Hague, his main tasks were mediating in the War of the Palatine Succession and securing the maritime powers' support for Swedish foreign policy, particularly concerning the Treaty of Altona and the conflict between Denmark and the Duke of Holstein. Despite conflicts with other Swedish diplomats and limited success in some mediation efforts, Lillieroot managed to secure important treaties and inform about the maritime powers' readiness to intervene at the outbreak of war in 1700. His work reflects the difficulties and complexity that characterized Swedish diplomacy during this period.

During the Age of Liberty (1719–1772), the Swedish diplomatic mission in The Hague lost much of its political significance but emerged as a hub for Sweden's commercial and technological knowledge. Joachim Fredrik Preis, with his extensive legal and practical expertise and wide-ranging connections, provided valuable insights to the Swedish government and the National Boards of Trade and Mines. He had a critical eye for the often fantastical plans that arose and showed a keen interest in fisheries, contributing to the establishment of a Swedish fishing company. Preis partially influenced the fishing regulations of the 1750s, drawing on Dutch models. He also relayed knowledge of new technology to Sweden, including detailed descriptions of steam engine technology for mine water pumping. Emanuel Swedenborg likely discussed similar matters with Joachim Fredrik Preis during a trip to the Netherlands in the 1720s.

Carl Johan Creutz was appointed as Sweden's representative to the States General of the Netherlands in 1760 due to his extensive service in the country. However, he faced criticism for not meeting expectations in his early dispatches. Gustav III replaced him with a younger diplomat due to his preference for a more personal approach. Creutz's dispatches during his tenure contained mainly political rumors from The Hague. He authored three reports on the Netherlands, particularly focusing on the years 1765 and 1769, providing a comprehensive account of the Dutch Republic's affairs.

Emanuel de Geer efficiently managed state loan transactions and trade negotiations in the Dutch Republic, despite their lack of direct political significance. Elis Schröderheim praised his mission to The Hague, noting its importance and benefits. De Geer's keen observation of political shifts in The Hague proved crucial, especially in the late 1770s when the Netherlands and Sweden aimed to protect trade against English privateers. However, his lavish household in The Hague drained his resources, pushing him to the brink of ruin. Coupled with health issues aggravated by the country's climate, he took leave in February 1779 and resigned from his ministerial post later that year.

Gustaf Johan Ehrensvärd was offered the ministerial post in The Hague in July 1779, formally settling by the turn of 1780. Despite concerns about his finances, he received a gratuity and started his diplomatic mission in September 1780. His role involved negotiating the potential accession of the Netherlands to the Nordic armed neutrality during the Anglo-French War. In September 1781, he requested six months' leave to return home but was instead asked to travel to Paris, though he stayed in The Hague due to conflicting responses from his superior. Ehrensvärd played no major political role and was transferred to the ministerial post in Berlin in April 1782.

During his time in The Hague (1816–1834), Abraham Constantin Mouradgea d'Ohsson served as a capable diplomat for Sweden. He was known for his skillful and loyal approach to his duties. One notable achievement was his handling of the dispute over Prince Gustav's title in 1828, where he demonstrated both firmness and tact. Overall, his tenure in The Hague was marked by effective diplomacy and earned him a reputation as one of Sweden's finest diplomats of the 19th century.

=== 1869–present ===
From 1869, the legation in Brussels, Belgium was shared with The Hague, located in the latter city and covering both states. Until 1921, the minister in Brussels had a dual accreditation in The Hague. In 1921 the position was divided, and a Swedish minister was accredited to The Hague. The reason was that the embassy position in The Hague has gained new importance due to the permanent location of the Permanent Court of International Justice there. Special qualifications in international law and related aspects of international politics were therefore necessary for the incumbent of this position to fully fulfill their duties.

From 1 April 1944, Gunnar Hägglöf served as envoy extraordinary and minister plenipotentiary to the Belgian government in exile and the Dutch government-in-exile in London. In 1945, it was reported that Gunnar Hägglöf would completely transfer to The Hague, and the position in Brussels would be filled again.

In September 1956, due to agreements between the Swedish and Dutch governments regarding the mutual elevation of their missions to embassies, envoy Sven Dahlman was appointed as ambassador. On 11 October 1956, Ambassador Dahlman presented his credentials as ambassador to Queen Juliana at the Huis ten Bosch palace in The Hague.

== Staff and tasks ==
=== Staff ===
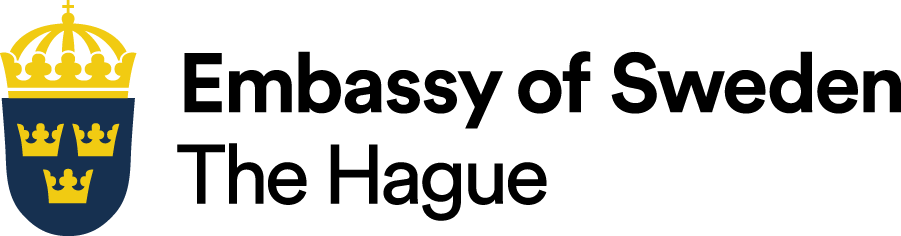
Embassy logo

The embassy staff consists of the ambassador, minister counsellor, three first secretaries, defence attaché, trade secretary, as well as locally employed staff in the form of assistant to the defence attaché, caretaker/receptionist, ambassador's secretary, receptionist/consular officer, officer for communication, culture and Sweden promotion, and a treasurer.

=== Tasks ===
The embassy works to monitor, represent and promote Swedish interests in all areas in the Netherlands and within the international organizations in The Hague. The embassy's duties consist of providing services to Swedish authorities, businesses, organizations, and individual citizens. Regular reports are sent to the Ministry for Foreign Affairs in Stockholm with information and analyses of, for example, political and economic developments and the country's stance on international events. A prioritized task for the embassy is to promote Swedish economic interests by assisting Swedish companies and encouraging foreign investments in Sweden. In this area, the embassy works closely with Business Sweden in The Hague and the Swedish Chamber of Commerce in Amsterdam. Another part of the embassy's work involves consular issues, meaning assistance to Swedish citizens abroad who have, for example, been victims of crime or lost their passports. Informing about Sweden is also included in the embassy's duties. This is done, for example, through seminars, exhibitions, and cultural events.

== Buildings ==
=== Chancery ===
From 1869 to 1921, the Swedish legation in Brussels was shared with The Hague and thus the chancery was located in Brussels. With the German occupation of Brussels in 1916, the mission moved to Hotel des Indes in The Hague, Netherlands, which was neutral during the war. Here it stayed until 1918 before returning to Brussels in 1919. From 1920, a chancery was operating in The Hague. In 1920, the chancery was situated at Mauritskade 73 in The Hague Center. From 1921 to 1922, it was situated at Wassenaarschekade 8 (Note: Until 1927, a part of the current street Wassenaarseweg was named Wassenaarschekade.) On 1 August 1922, the chancery moved to Koninginnegracht 53. It remained here until 1930.

From 1931 to 1940, the chancery was situated at Lange Voorhout 28. From 1940 to 1947, no address was given. From 1948 to 1968, the chancery was situated at Jan van Nassaustraat 26 in the neighborhood of Benoordenhout in the district of Haagse Hout. From 1969 to at least 1979, the chancery was situated a few blocks away at Neuhuyskade 40. The chancery later moved to Johan de Wittlaan 7 in the Zorgvliet neighborhood where it remains today.

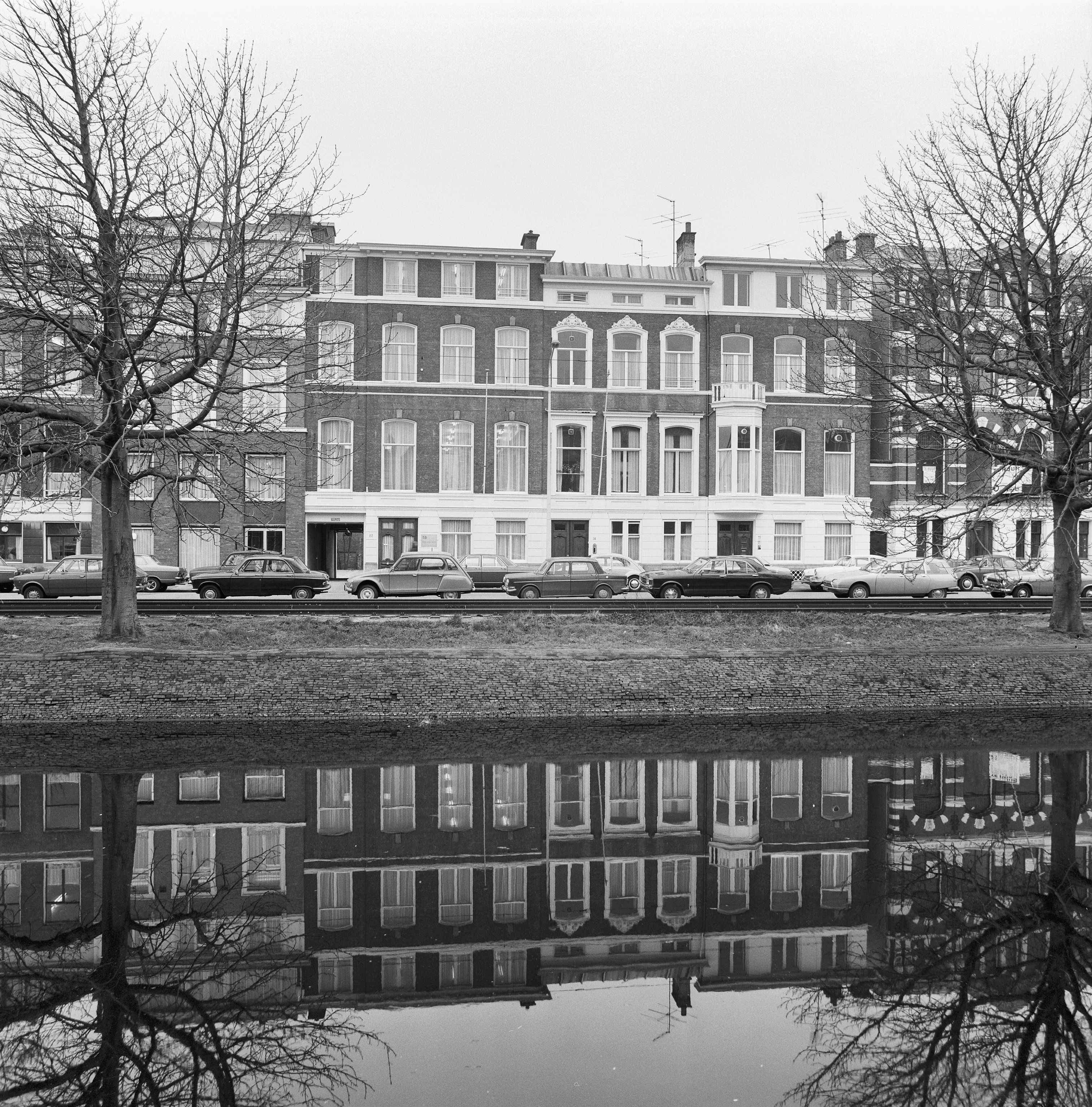
Koninginnegracht 53 (1922–1931)

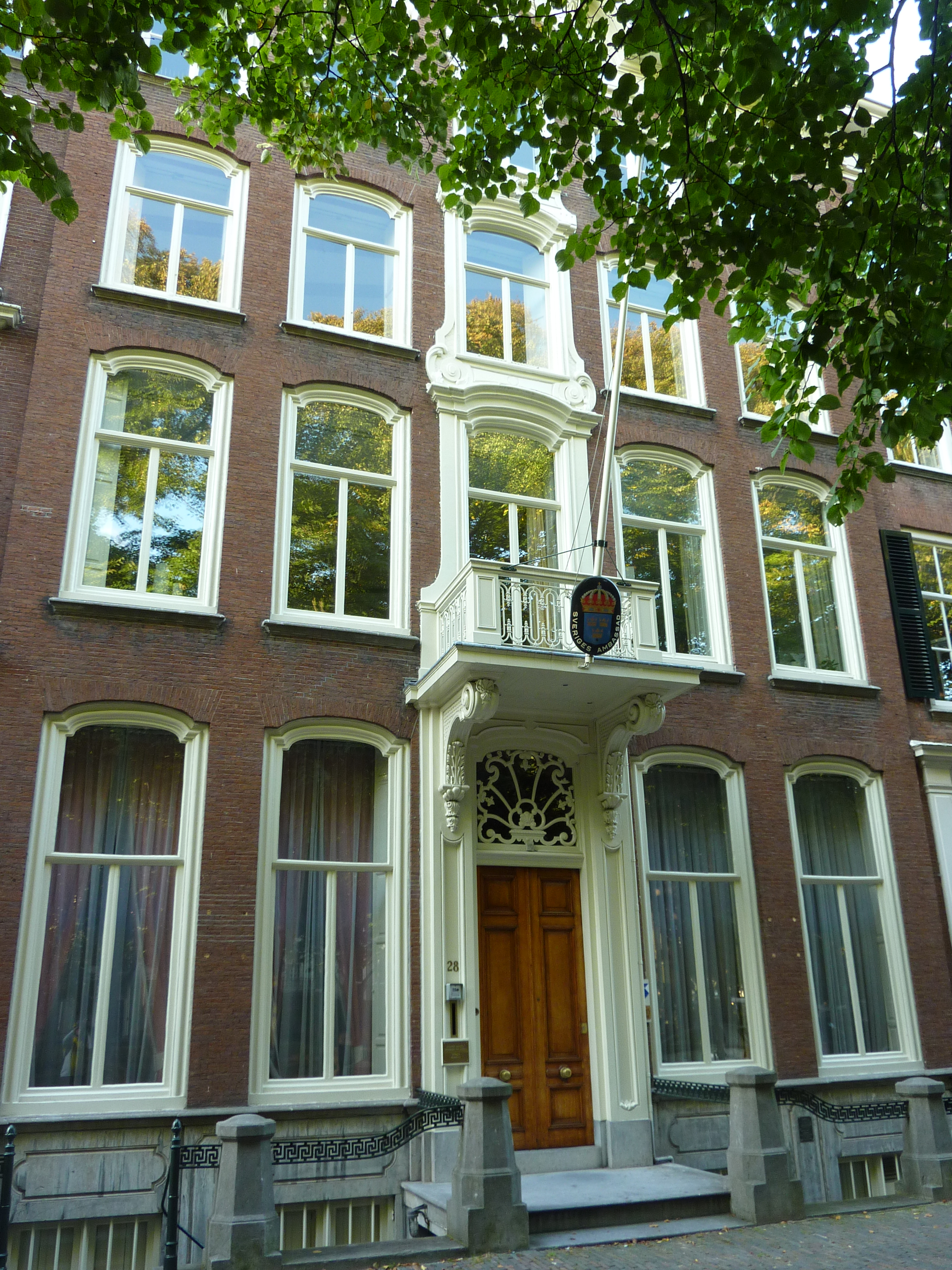
Lange Voorhout 28 (1931–1940)

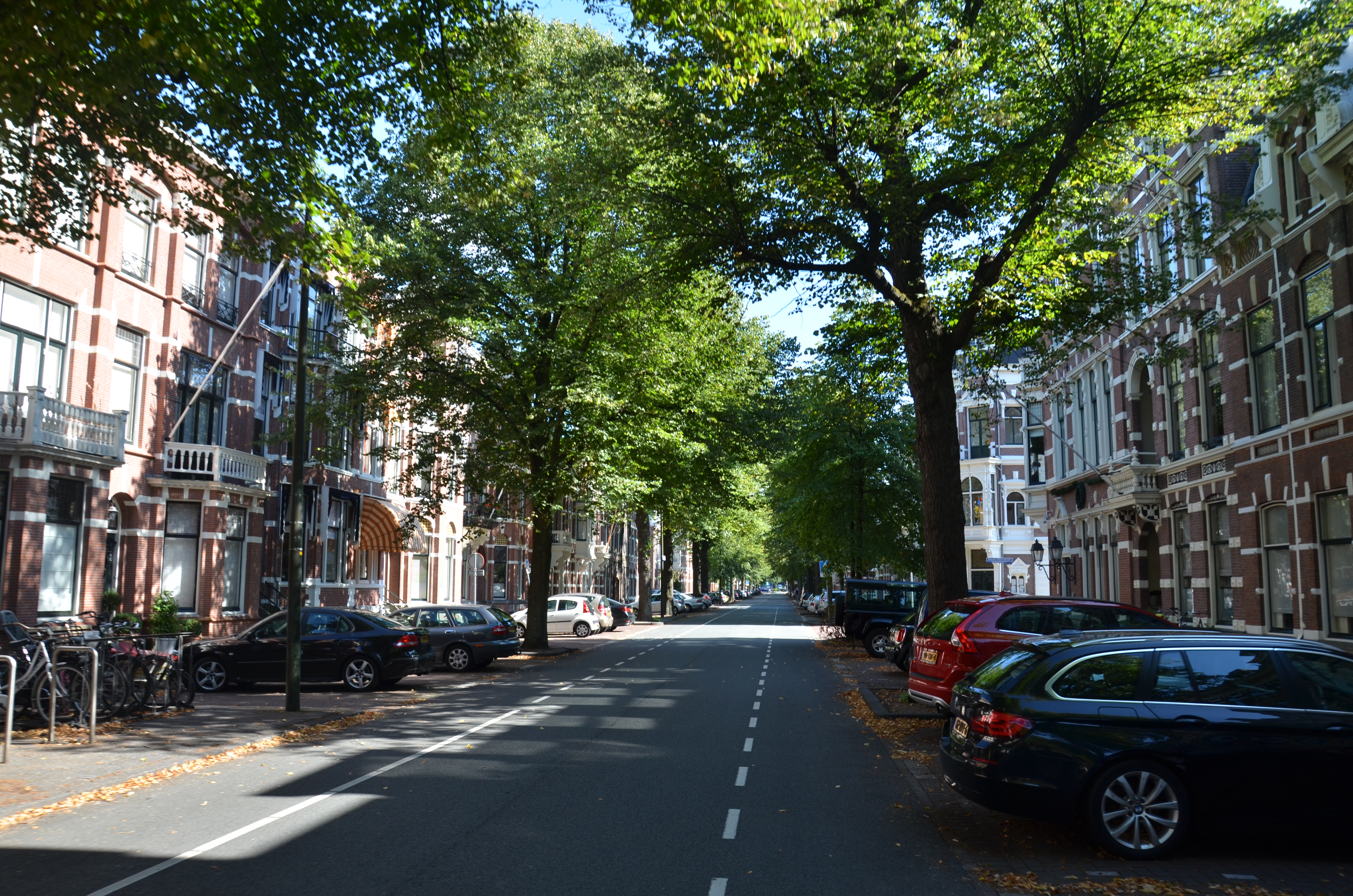
Jan van Nassaustraat (1948–1968)

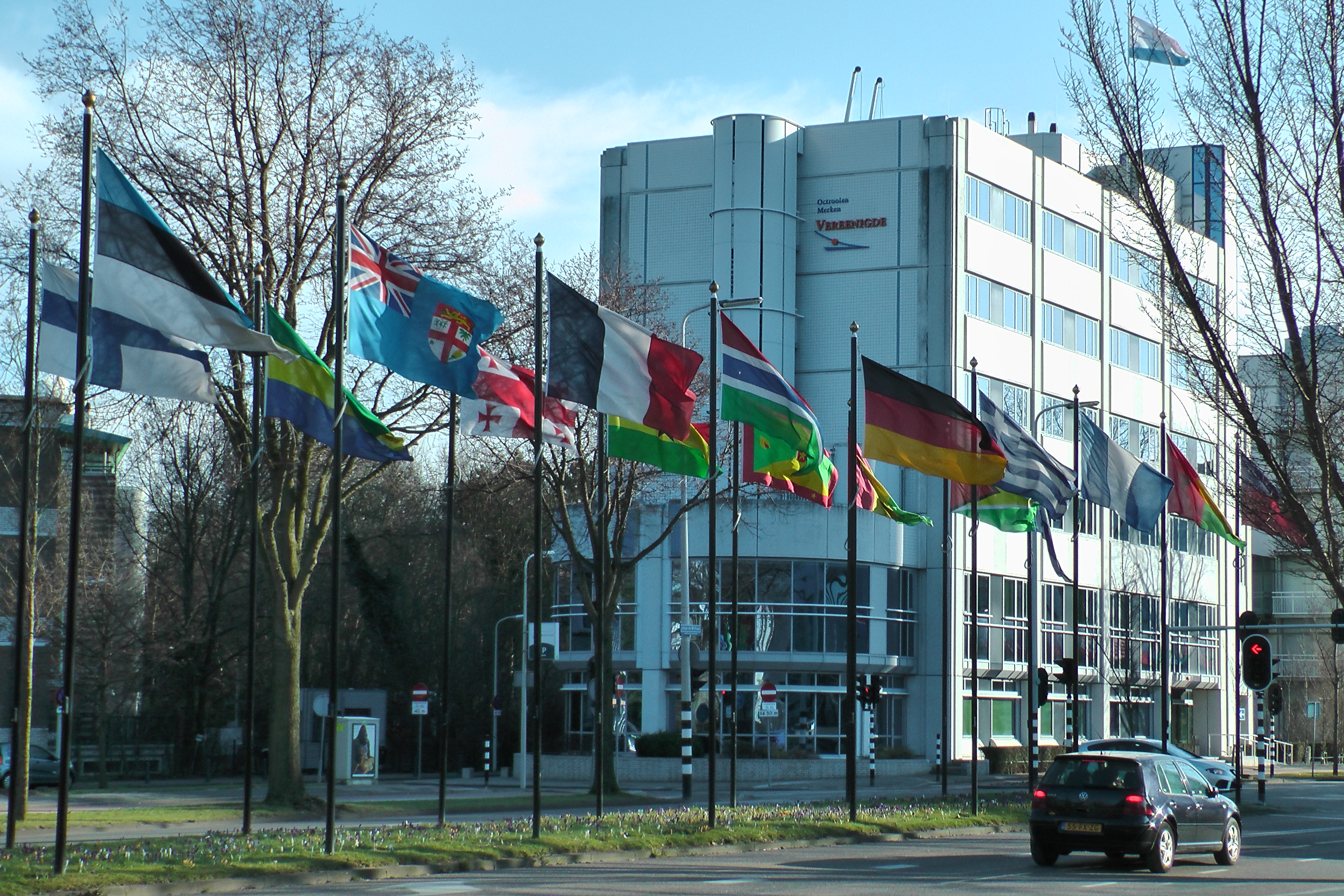
Johan de Wittlaan 7 (?–present)

=== Residence ===
Lange Voorhout 28
- Interactive map of Lange Voorhout 28
- 52.08268°N 4.31160°E

History
- Built: 1736

Site notes
- Current use: Residence of the Swedish ambassador
- Owner: Swedish state

Rijksmonument
- Designated: 11 January 1967
- Reference no.: 17702

The residence at Lange Voorhout 28 in the old city centre of The Hague was acquired by the Swedish state in 1929 for 120,000 SEK, which, according to the National Board of Public Building (Byggnadsstyrelsen), was considered advantageous even considering that some modernizations and repairs needed to be undertaken at a cost of around 63,000 SEK. The proposal for the property purchase came from the Swedish minister Patrick Adlercreutz. The architect Peder Clason conducted the inspection of the property. In addition to the main house, there was a recent addition constructed on the courtyard, consisting of one floor, which housed a dining room and more.

Constructed in 1736, the building is one of many private residences built along the street Lange Voorhout, "the long forest," by members of Holland's leading families. The name originates from the medieval period when there was a forested area here, just outside the city limits and adjacent to the ramparts around the castle. Like several properties along Lange Voorhout from that period, the residence has been greatly influenced by the buildings of the French-born architect Daniel Marot in The Hague. In 1962, the property was expanded through the purchase of Lange Voorhout 30 and 32, as well as additional buildings at the back with facades facing Kazernestraat 35–37. This purchase also included access to a larger garden. Kazernestraat 35–37 is standing two stories high, with garages and storage spaces. The intervening garden is approximately 600 square meters. Since 1967, Lange Voorhout 28 has been listed as a national heritage site.

The residence's baroque facade in red brick facing Lange Voorhout bears clear traces of Louis XIV and France. The influence of the French king also characterizes the interior, with state rooms modeled after French town palaces featuring wall paintings, fireplaces, and ceilings adorned with stucco ornaments. The residence comprises four residential floors and a basement. The ground floor is often used for receptions. The two floors above are the ambassador's private residence. The staircase hall features marble pilasters, an aged balustrade, an oak staircase, and light filtering in from a roof lantern, originally designed to admit light from skylights but now supplemented with electric lighting. Hanging in the staircase are plaster medallions with profile portraits of famous Swedes from the 18th century.

Over the years under Swedish ownership, the residence has undergone maintenance and improvements. A renovation completed in 1993, designed by architects Bo Myrenberg and Hando Kask, included the installation of district heating, a new kitchen and laundry room, as well as a wine cellar and storage spaces. The facade has been regularly renovated, and in 2006, the entire garden was redesigned. During the renovation, only one tree remained in the garden, around which the new garden was designed. In 2012–2013, the reception area was renovated, including radiator replacement and extensive painting work. A careful renovation was undertaken in 2015 with the assistance of White Arkitekter.

Lange Voorhout 28

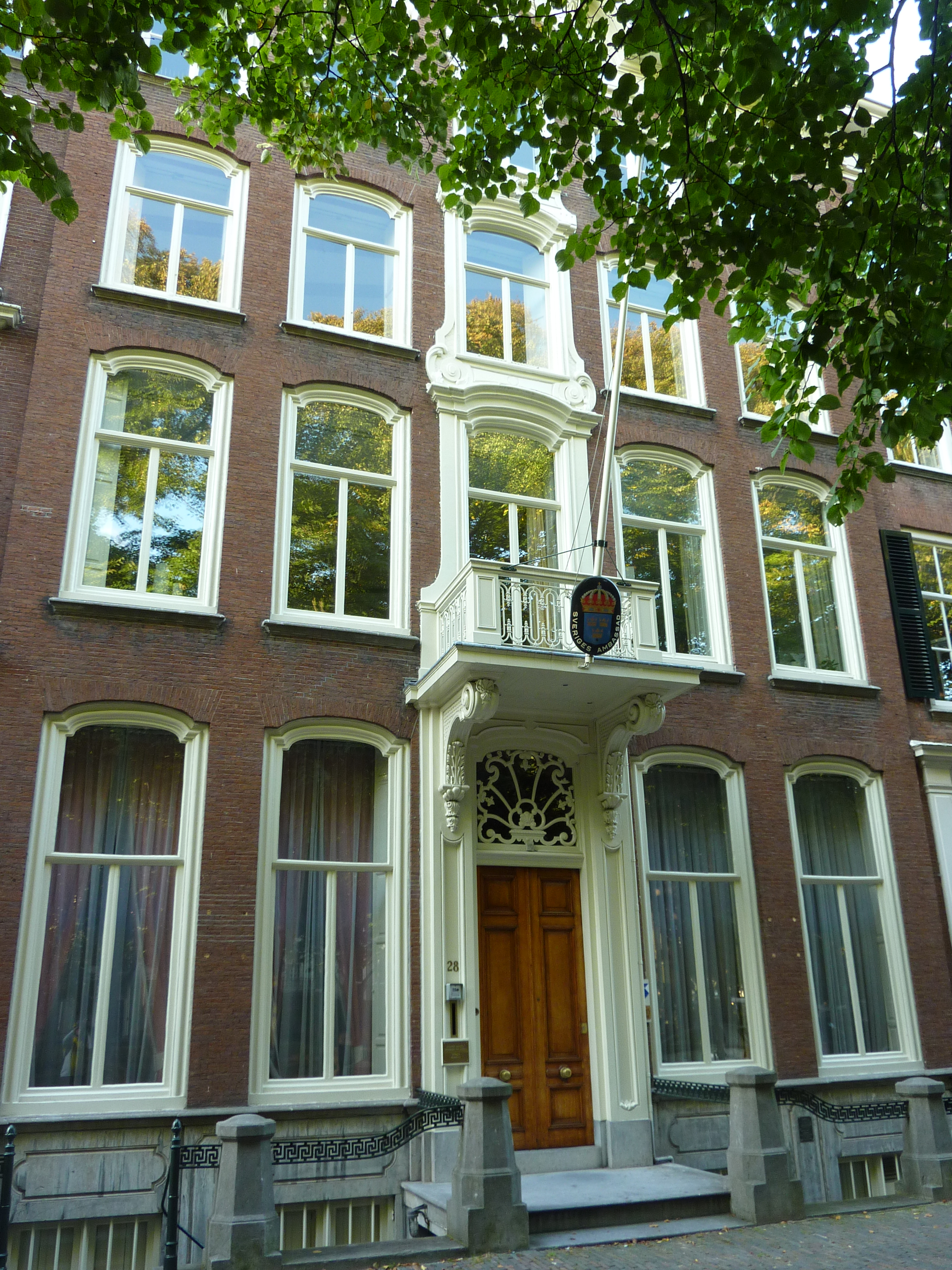
Façade

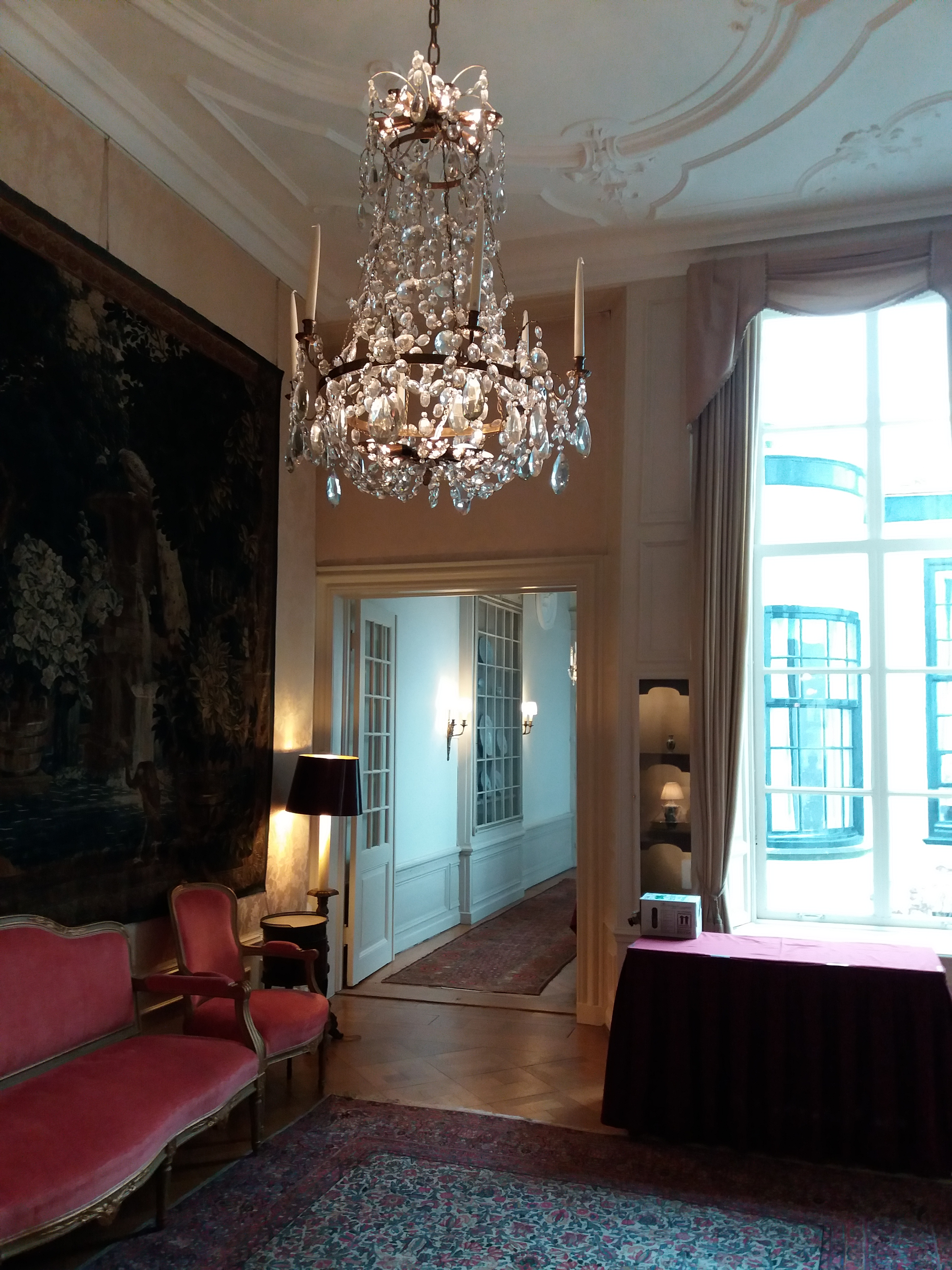
Interior

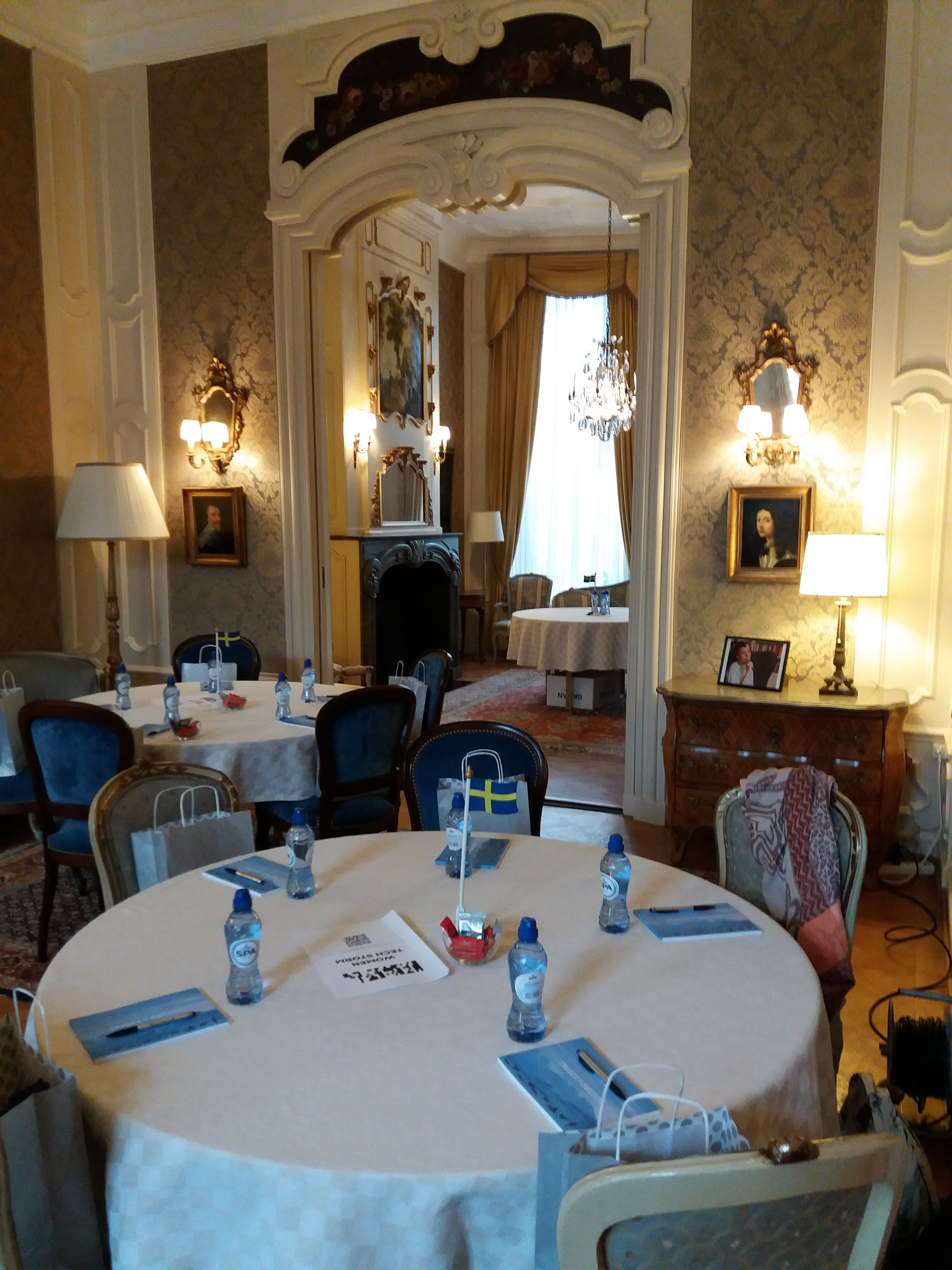
Interior

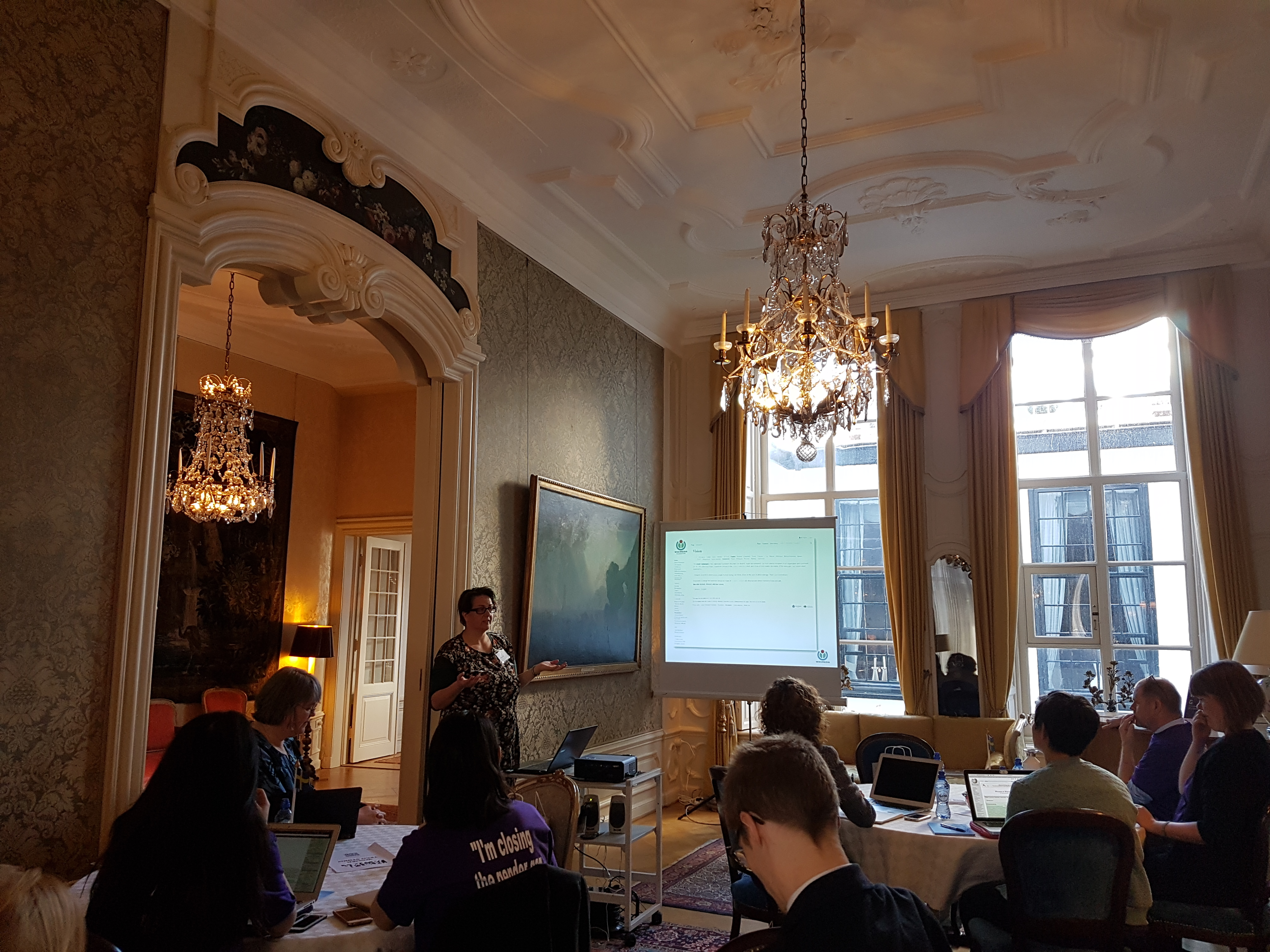
Interior

== See also ==
- Netherlands–Sweden relations
