= Lange Voorhout =

Street in The Hague, the Netherlands

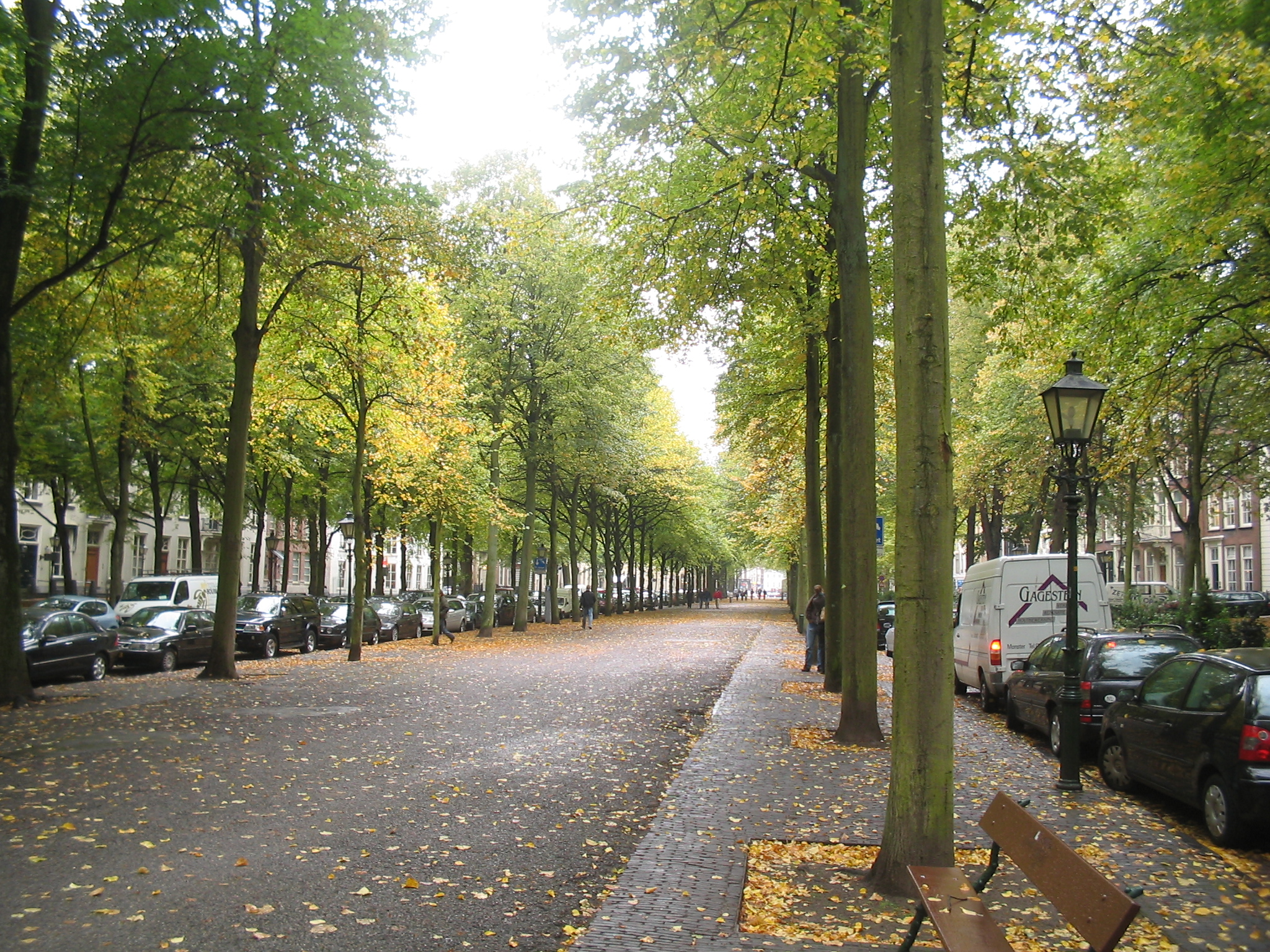
- Lange Voorhout in 2005
- Interactive map of Lange Voorhout
- Type: Avenue
- Length: 0.47 km (0.29 mi)
- Location: The Hague, Netherlands
- Coordinates: 52°4′56″N 4°18′41″E

Construction
- Construction start: 1536

Other
- Status: In use

The Lange Voorhout (Dutch pronunciation: [ˈlɑŋə voːrˈɦʌut]) is a street in the old city centre of The Hague, Netherlands. This L-shaped street runs from Kneuterdijk in the west to Toernooiveld in the east, reaching approximately 0.47 kilometres (0.29 mi) in length.

== History ==
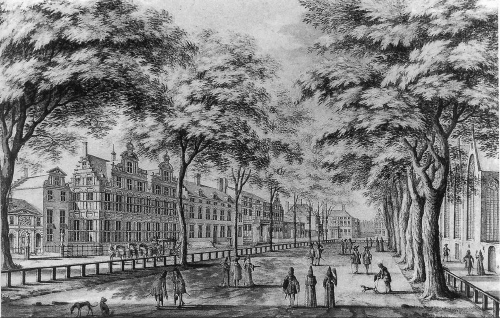
The Lange Voorhout in 1689.

In the Middle Ages, the Lange Voorhout was bordered by several farms. Only in the 14th and 15th centuries, when the Counts of Holland modernised the governance of the county with new administrative divisions, were houses built in this area. The Lange Voorhout and surroundings pre-eminently became the neighbourhood where courtiers and later statesmen came to live. Between 1350 and 1450, the first town castles of nobles, houses of ducal staff, the Predikherenklooster and residences for high magistrates appeared here. But for centuries the elite did not hold the sole right to live on Lange Voorhout. For a long time, the street was a central terminus for all traffic from and to The Hague; wagons from Leiden and Scheveningen were garaged and unloaded here. This meant that inns, wheelwrights and forges were also established on the Lange Voorhout.

In 1536, Charles V, Holy Roman Emperor, visited The Hague. He decided that the front gardens of all the buildings should be joined to create a broad avenue. He also ordered that four rows of lime trees be planted, giving it its stately aesthetic. In 1597, stadtholder Maurice, Prince of Orange, proposed to construct a canal along the street. After the Reformation, the Catholic minster was converted into a cannon foundry, and a canal could have helped the transport of the heavy cannons. Although a canal was dug along the nearby Mauritskade, a connecting canal along the Lange Voorhout was never constructed, likely due to the high sand bank on which the street was located. In the Golden Age, the very rich settled in palace-like residences on the Lange Voorhout.

== Architecture and notable buildings ==
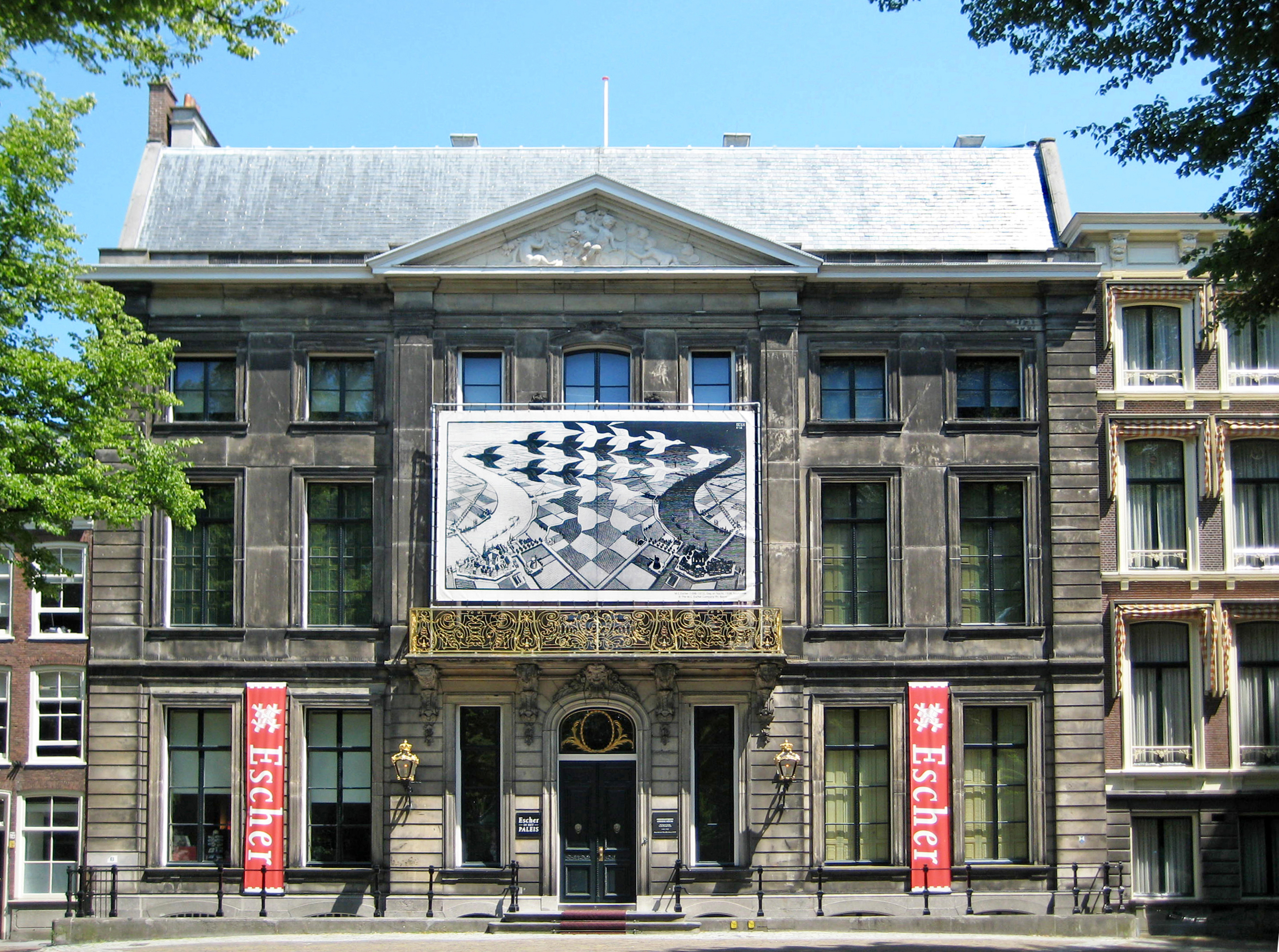
Lange Voorhout Palace in 2010.

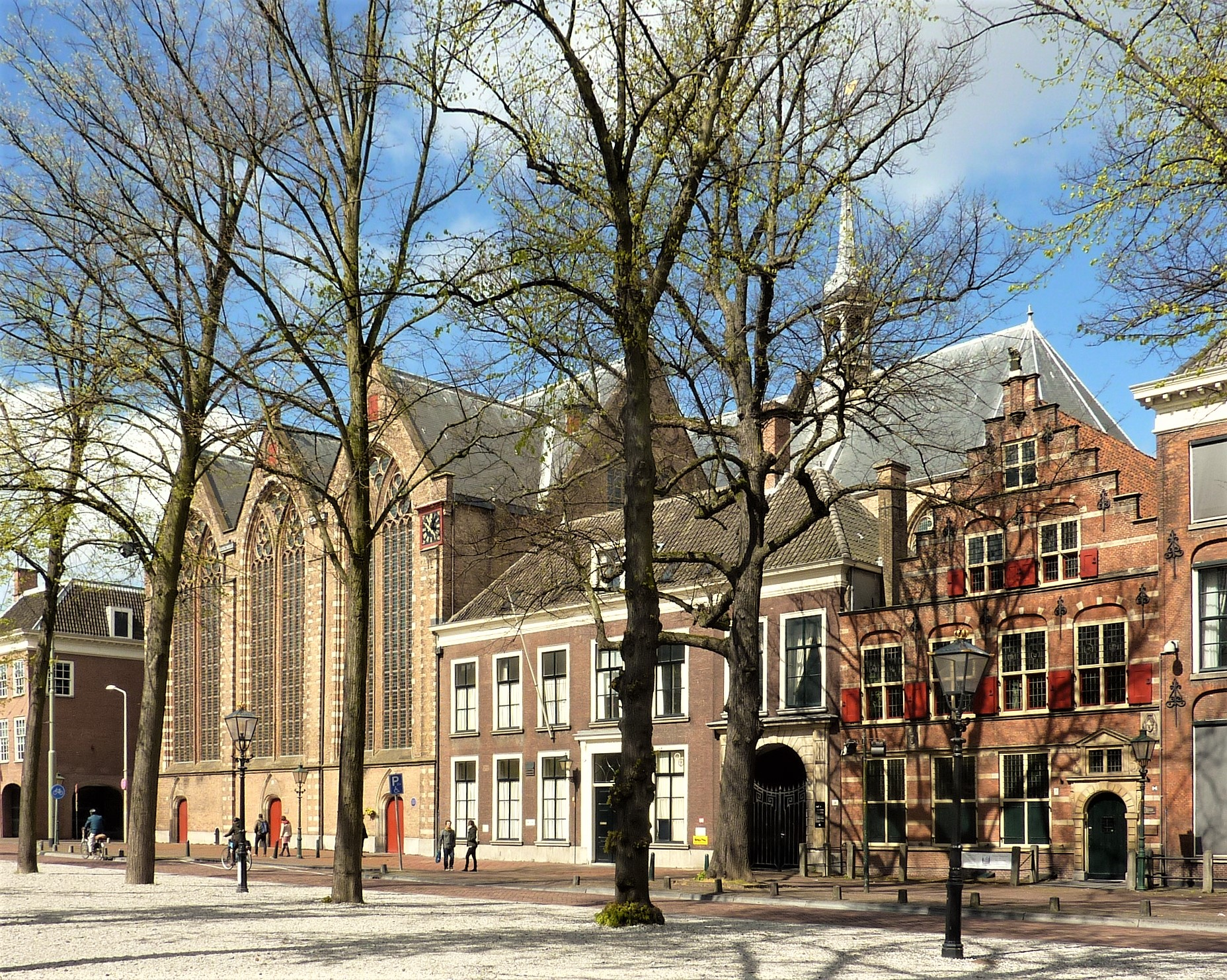
Kloosterkerk and Pagehuis

Most Dutch renaissance buildings that were originally located along the Lange Voorhout were replaced in the 18th century. As a result, the houses along the Lange Voorhout today are predominantly 18th century, or constructed in the 19th or 20th century in an 18th-century style. Most of them are Rijksmonumenten.

The street is home to a great many institutions and monuments, including:

- The Kloosterkerk, a 14th-century minster (No. 2)
- Ambassadorial Residence of Sweden (No. 28)
- Huis Huguetan (No. 34–36)
- Hotel des Indes (No. 54–56)
- Lange Voorhout Palace, today housing the Escher Museum (No. 74)
- The Parliamentary Documentation Centre (PDC UL) (No. 86)
- The learned society Diligentia
- Pulchri Studio, an art institution and studio
- Embassies of United Kingdom, Spain and Switzerland
- A monument commemorating Prince Bernhard of Saxe-Weimar-Eisenach, constructed in 1864, near the south-eastern end

Huis Huguetan at 34–36 was once the home of the Koninklijke Bibliotheek (Royal Library of the Netherlands, and subsequently (1988 to 2016) the Supreme Court of the Netherlands. In 2016 the court moved into a new building at Korte Voorhout 8.

The former Michelin-starred restaurants Saur and Royal used to be on Lange Voorhout.
