= David Bryn-Jones =

David Bryn-Jones (born August 4, 1883, in Merthyr Tydvil, South Wales) was a Welsh-born American historian, educator, Baptist minister, and biographer of U.S. Secretary of State Frank B. Kellogg, who won the Nobel Peace Prize as one of the authors of the Kellogg-Briand Pact.

Bryn-Jones studied theology and political science in the University College of North Wales. Before leaving Britain for the United States, he served as lecturer at a Welsh university and as pastor of churches at Birkenhead and Newcastle upon Tyne.

Bryn-Jones joined the faculty of Carleton College in Northfield, Minnesota, in 1920. At Carleton he taught history, economics, and political science from 1920 until his retirement in 1951. While at Carleton, he also served as minister at Trinity Baptist Church in Minneapolis, where he was the full-time minister beginning in 1927.

Bryn-Jones' main interest was in contemporary relations among world powers. During his later years at Carleton, he was a founder and later chairman of a new academic department of government and international relations, in which he held the title of Frank B. Kellogg Professor of International Relations.

In 1937 Bryn-Jones released the authorized biography of his personal acquaintance, former U.S. Senator and Secretary of State Frank B. Kellogg, who died that same year.

== Legacy ==
Bryn-Jones was married to the former Marian Adams, a Carleton graduate who worked for the college for many years as a librarian. After her death in 2002, the college received a bequest of $1.4 million from the couple's estate.

== Books by David Bryn-Jones ==
- Frank B. Kellogg: A Biography. New York: G. P. Putnam's Sons, 1937. (Reissued in 2007: ISBN 978-1-4325-8982-0)
- Toward a Democratic New Order. Minneapolis: University of Minnesota Press, 1945. 288 pages.
- The Dilemma of the Idealist. Macmillan, 1950. 278 pages.
