= Kellogg Foundation for Education in International Relations =

In 1937 Frank B. Kellogg established for Carleton College the Frank B. Kellogg Foundation for Education in International Relations with a $500,000 endowment. Kellogg was a trustee of the college at the time. The endowment initially funded two full-time professors and one half-time professor, and provided scholarships for six students: four at Carleton College and two Carleton students studying abroad.

== Frank B. Kellogg Professors of International Relations ==
- David Bryn-Jones, 1936–1952
- Reginald Lang, 1956-57 Visiting professor of International Relations on the Frank B. Kellogg Foundation.
- Roy F. Grow, Frank B. Kellogg professor of international relations, emeritus
- Alfred P. Montero, current Frank B. Kellogg professor of political science
- Heinrich P. Jordan
- James K. Pollock
- M. J. Bonn, Visiting Professor

== Sources ==
- Time Magazine, June 14, 1937
