= Royal (restaurant) =

Coordinates: 52°4′59.1″N 4°18′44.16″E

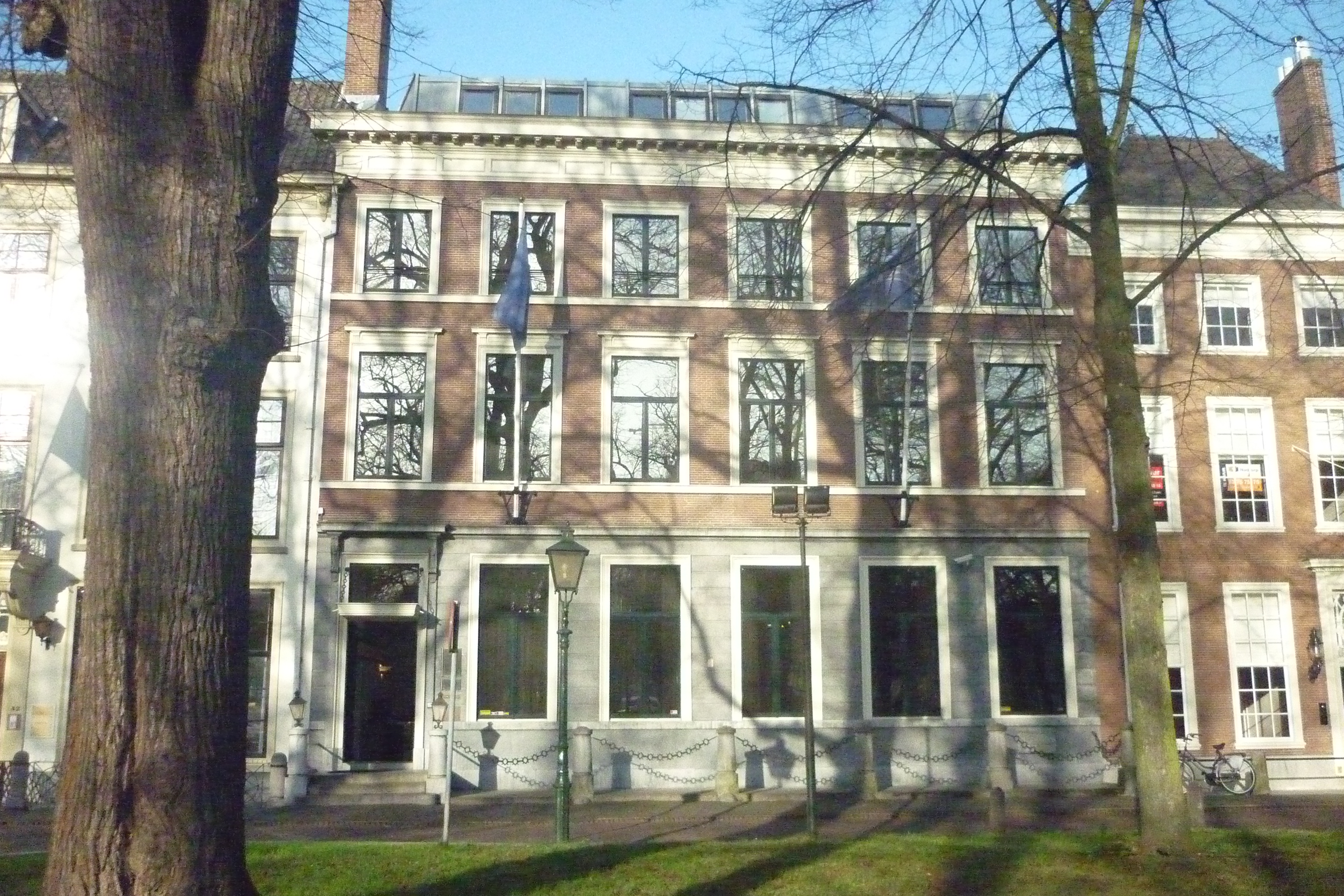
- Interactive map of Royal

Restaurant information
- Established: 1890
- Closed: around 1990
- Location: Lange Voorhout 44, The Hague, 2514 EG, Netherlands

Royal was a restaurant in The Hague, Netherlands. It was a fine dining restaurant that was awarded one Michelin star in 1958 and retained that rating until 1968.

The building in which the restaurant was located was once the residence of Constantijn Huygens. Restaurant Royal was housed at the address Kneuterdijk 1 from August 1890 till 1918. In 1918, the restaurant, at that time under the leadership of L.J.A. Kemper, relocated to the address Lange Voorhout 44.

The restaurant got into serious difficulties in 1987. Attempts to save it by newspaper publisher A.G. Sijthoff and Brewery Heineken failed and the building was sold to real estate broker Harry Mens, who converted it to an office building. During the rebuilding and renovation, several special artefacts, like the glass dome, were conserved.

The building is a Rijksmonument since 1973.

== See also ==
- List of Michelin starred restaurants in the Netherlands
