= Clara Cook Kellogg =

American political hostess

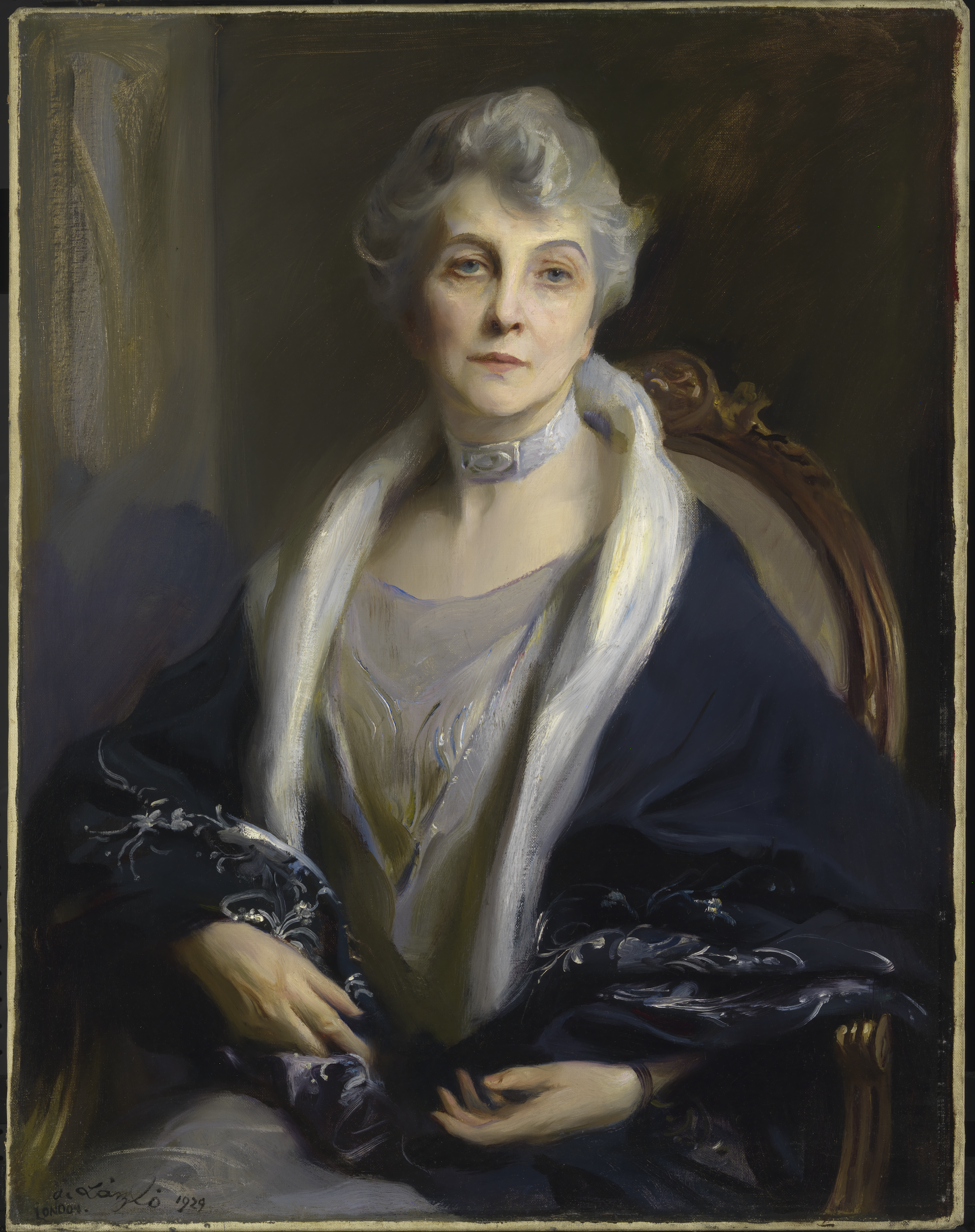
- Clara Cook Kellogg, in a 1929 portrait by Philip de László
- Born: Clara Margaret Cook; December 30, 1861; Rochester, Minnesota
- Died: October 1, 1942 (aged 80); Saint Paul, Minnesota
- Resting place: Washington National Cathedral (her and husband's ashes)
- Occupation: Political hostess
- Spouse: Frank B. Kellogg (m. 1886; died 1937)

Clara M. Cook Kellogg (December 30, 1861 – October 1, 1942) was an American political hostess. As wife of Senator, ambassador, and Secretary of State Frank B. Kellogg, she was socially prominent in Washington, D.C., and at the American embassy in London.

== Early life ==
Clara M. Cook was born in Rochester, Minnesota, the daughter of George Clinton Cook and Elizabeth Burns Cook. Her father was born in Vermont and her mother was born in Ireland. Cook was a teacher before she married.

== Career ==
Kellogg was a prominent political hostess in Washington, D.C. and in London, while her husband held office as in the United States Senate from 1917 to 1923, as American ambassador to Great Britain from 1924 to 1925, and as Secretary of State from 1925 to 1929. During her time in London, she was considered "charming" and "well-dressed". She was honored by the American Women's Club in that city, and represented the ambassador at the opening of the American Hospital at Hampstead in 1924. She was especially close to Queen Mary of Teck.

In Minnesota, she served on the board of directors at the state children's home, Sheltering Arms. She was also a member of the Ramsey County Republican Woman's Club and the League of Protestant Women.

== Personal life ==
Cook married lawyer Kellogg in 1886. He died in 1937; she died in 1942, aged 80 years, in Saint Paul, Minnesota. Her ashes were placed with her husband's, behind a memorial stone in the Washington National Cathedral. The Minnesota Historical Society Library holds a collection of her papers, and a larger collection of her husband's papers.
