= Hotel des Indes (The Hague) =

Hotel in The Hague

Hotel Des Indes

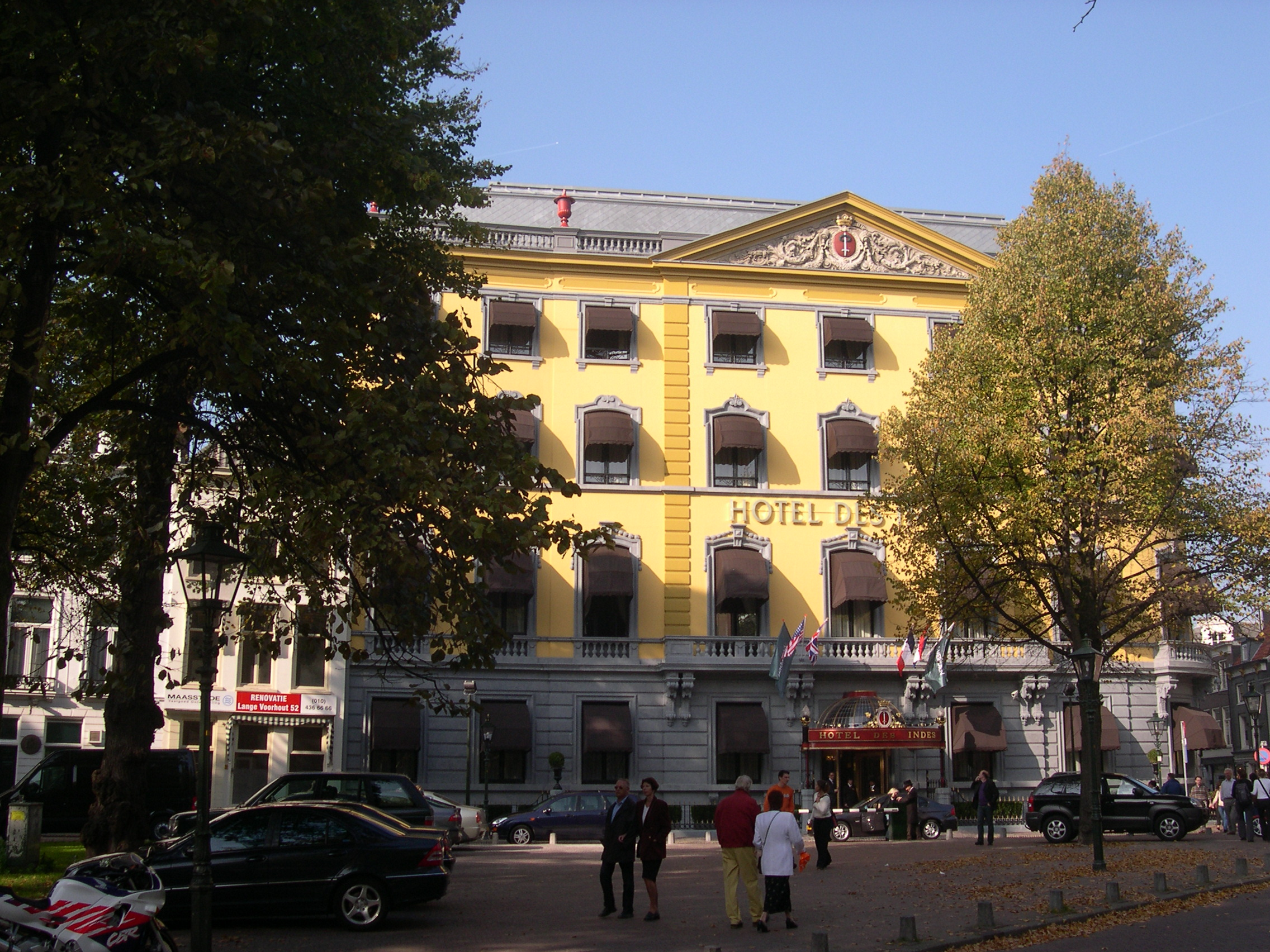
- Interactive map of the Hotel Des Indes area
- Hotel chain: The Leading Hotels of the World, Ltd.

General information
- Status: National monument (monument ID number 17714)
- Location: Lange Voorhout 54 - 56, 2514 EG The Hague, The Netherlands
- Coordinates: 52°05′02″N 4°18′48″E
- Named for: Hotel des Indes (Batavia)
- Inaugurated: May 1, 1881
- Owner: Westmont Hospitality Group

Technical details
- Floor count: 7

Design and construction
- Architect: Arend Roodenburg

Other information
- Number of rooms: 92 (including suites)
- Number of suites: 13
- Parking: 30 places (managed by the city)

Website
- www.hoteldesindesthehague.com

Hotel Des Indes is a hotel located at the Lange Voorhout in The Hague, The Netherlands. It was constructed as a mansion in 1858. In 1881, it opened as a hotel.

== History ==
=== Palace ===
This building was originally constructed as a city palace in 1858 for William Thierry, baron Van Brienen van de Groote Lindt, a personal advisor of King William III who often stayed in The Hague. The baron purchased three houses located at the Lange Voorhout and the Vos in Tuinstraat and had them demolished. One of these buildings, which was towards the back of the current building, was home to the museum dedicated to King William II. On this newly combined lot, he commissioned the construction of a new palace by architect Arend Roodenburg for a total sum of 150,000 guilders. The baron wanted a palace in the political capital of The Netherlands for holding parties and receptions. The mansion featured a spacious inner court, stables, residences for private guests and servants, and a ballroom. Originally one could enter with a horse-drawn carriage through the main entrance and have the carriage turn around, ready for departure, in the still-existing rotunda, which is now used as a tea room.

After the baron's death in 1863 the palace was inherited by his son Arnold, who found it too big for his needs and sold it a few years later. The palace became the property of hotelier François Paulez, who gifted it to his daughter Alegonda. She converted it into a hotel with her husband Friedrich Wirtz, who would become the hotel's first general manager.

=== Hotel ===
==== Grand Opening ====
The palace underwent four years of renovations and conversions to be opened on May 1, 1881, by Prince Frederik, uncle of William III. It was named after the then-famous Hotel des Indes (des Indes meaning Of the Indies) in Batavia hoping to attract travellers from the Dutch East Indies. On the facade of the building, the family coat of arms was replaced by the coat of arms of Batavia.

The hotel started off with 120 rooms and only one bathroom per floor, which was a luxury for its time; it was soon reputed for its fine elegance and hosted many extravagant parties and exclusive banquets. The hotel did experience harsher times, but in 1899, when Tsar Nicholas II of Russia initiated the first International Peace Conference of The Hague, the attendance of several international leaders of governments and diplomats created an upturn.

In 1894, general manager Wirtz took over the Oranjehotel in the Scheveningen district of The Hague. The Hotel des Indes was placed under a newly created public company, Maatschappij tot Exploitatie van Hotel des Indes nv, and Christian Haller, who used to work at London's Savoy Hotel, became the new general manager. Haller was responsible for securing the Hotel des Indes as the official hotel for the 1899 Hague Peace Conference, defeating competitors across the city, leading it to become a famous "home away from home" for several international diplomats, royals, artists and scholars. Haller considerably modernized the hotel: by 1900 he had telephones, an intercom system connected to the front desk, and bath tubs and washing stands featuring both hot and cold water installed in all rooms. In 1902, a hydraulic elevator was installed that ran on the pressure from the city's waterworks and architect Foek Kuipers was contracted to transform the inner court into a hall with a formal staircase and a large glass dome to cover the rotunda.

==== Between World Wars ====
World War I was disastrous for business. By 1918, the hotel was in so much financial trouble that Haller decided to sell all the assets of the company. These were bought at the price of 1.25 million guilders by the Nederlandsche Uitvoer Maatschappij, who planned to convert the hotel into an office building. This caused an outrage among citizens that wanted to keep the prestigious hotel. Notably due to pressure from The Hague's Mayor Patijn, the Dutch government was persuaded to take over the hotel. The transaction took place on May 2, 1919, for the then-spectacular price of 1,335,071 guilders and 19½ cents. The government wanted a large building on stand by that could instantly be used as crisis offices. The Ministry of Foreign Affairs liked the idea of having a large luxury hotel at their disposal. Although the government owned the hotel for several decades, it continued to be operated as a hotel by Haller's wife, Mrs. Haller-Rey, and her brother, Mr. Henri Rey, both Monégasque. Henri Rey, the Consul General of Monaco to The Hague, became the sole director in 1922.

In 1925, the hotel innovated again by offering a gigolo service who, in this time period, was simply a male dancer who would entertain unmarried female guests.

The 1930s started poorly for the hotel. On January 23, 1931, ballerina Anna Pavlova died in her room (where now the reception area stands) from pneumonia. A salon on the ground floor was later renamed after her. A few months later, while hosting the celebrations for the 73rd birthday of Queen Mother Emma, the wiring for some of the event's lighting short circuited and caused a fire that gutted the third floor and damaged the roof. Rey seized the opportunity during the reconstruction to add a fourth floor that was once planned but, up until then, never realized.

The government would step in once again during Great Depression to keep the hotel afloat.

==== World War II ====
When World War II broke out, Henri Rey and his wife attempt to flee to England. Rey and his two children succeeded, but his wife was killed by Dutch forces that mistakenly opened fire on the car near the harbour at the Hook of Holland. On May 1, 1940, German ambassador Julius von Zech-Burkersroda and his staff were brought to the hotel as prisoners of war, and were guarded for two weeks. On May 15, Henri Winkelman brought the news that The Netherlands had capitulated.

For the rest of the war, the Hotel des Indes was a popular meeting place for the German occupiers in The Hague, and was also the Dutch headquarters for the Wehrmacht High Command. Deputy Manager Van der Wert, who worked at the hotel from 1923 until 1968, ran it in Rey's absence.

Although Henri Rey died in England in 1945, his pigeon house on the roof of the hotel still stands today. The hotel management brought a small group of Jews here to hide from prosecution during the Holocaust; they all survived the war.

==== Post-WWII difficulties ====
After the war, Jean Jacques Rey, the son of Henri Rey, left his role as a pilot in the Royal Air Force and returned to The Netherlands. Following in his father's footsteps, he took over the management of the Hotel des Indes in 1946 and became the Consul General of Monaco to The Hague. He transformed the pigeon house into a room for his model trains which also featured a large Monegasque flag.

The tourism industry was changing by the 1950s and 60s. Travellers looked for more modern accommodations and the Hotel des Indes saw diminishing guest numbers. Rey re-established a stable clientele with some innovative changes to the hotel, but it would not be enough. In 1971, the hotel announced its closure. Prime Minister Barend Biesheuvel, a regular dining guest, had a last official dinner with his ministers (including politicians Norbert Schmelzer and Arnold Tilanus) on October 27, 1971. The three gentlemen decided to contact their private networks to save the hotel; they convinced entrepreneur Julius Verwoerdt to take over the hotel's management.

Verwoerdt bought the building back from the Dutch government for 1,380,000 guilders and contracted construction coordinator Altkemper for an intense renovation. Some notable changes included the removal of the old coal-burning stove from the kitchen, the replacement of the broken steam central heating system, the replacement of all electric infrastructure (including wiring), and the renovation of all guest rooms and the iconic central hall.

In 1979, Verwoerdt sold his company (which has grown to be a small hotel empire, counting 13 hotels) to Crest Hotels, the hotel subsidiary of UK-based Bass Brewery.

In the 70s and 80s, the hotel hosted a series of tripartisan meetings to discuss then-controversial topics such as gay marriage, abortion and euthanasia, which were a taboo to discuss in parliament at the time. These meetings were later nicknamed "The Des-Indes Deliberations" and eventually led to the first "Purple" cabinet of the Netherlands.

==== The Era of Hotel Chains ====
In 1990, the Inter-Continental Group, which had already been entrusted with the management of the hotel since 1975, bought all the assets of the hotel for 37.5M guilders, only to put it back up for sale a year later due to worries about returns on investment, owing to the strict budgets of the diplomats who made up most of the hotel's clientele. The chain continued to manage the hotel until 2000.

In late 2002, Le Méridien assumed management for the hotel. Between 2004–2005 the hotel received a major renovation worth €28,000,000. The new interior was designed by French interior architect Jacques Garcia, who added another floor set a few meters set back from the facade and had the white facade painted yellow. After Le Méridien was acquired by Starwood, the hotel re-opened in November 2005 under the banner of The Luxury Collection.

In 2015, the hotel was sold to the Canadian Westmont Hospitality Group, which also owns the Bel Air Hotel in The Hague.

In December 2018, the management contract with Starwood, which had merged with Marriott International, was terminated. The hotel is now part of the smaller The Leading Hotels of the World chain of luxury hotels.

== Notable guests ==
- Lourens Alma Tadema, a renowned Dutch-British painter, was the first guest in the hotel on 26 April 1881, which was before the official opening. He attended a family dinner celebrating the silver wedding anniversary of fellow artist Mesdag.
- Empress Eugenie, wife of Napoleon III of France, in July 1881. She would stay a second time in 1887.
- Sir John Whittaker Ellis, Lord Mayor of London, in 1882, accompanied by Sir Reginald Hanson and Sir William Anderson Ogg, sheriffs of London and Middlesex, during a return visitation after a visit from Queen Emma to London.
- Mirza Malkam Khan, Persian diplomat, politician and state modernizer, in 1883.
- Prince Prisdang of Siam, during a diplomatic mission, in 1883.
- Prince Philippe of Belgium and his wife rented the entire second floor during their visit to The Hague in 1883.
- Paul Kruger, president of South African Republic, visited The Hague in 1884 and again in 1900-1901 during his exile.
- Michaël Romanov, Grand Duke of Russia, son of Emperor Nicolas I, in 1885, accompanied by his wife Princess Cecile of Baden.
- Antoine Philippe, Duke of Montpensier, in 1885, travelling under the pseudonym "Duke of Bonanza".
- Queen Natalija Obrenović, in 1888, travelling under the name "Countess Tokova".
- Pierre Waldeck-Rousseau, minister and prime minister of France, in 1890
- Abbas II of Egypt, viceroy of Egypt, in 1890. and in 1894.
- Archduke Friedrich, Duke of Teschen, in 1890, to attend the funerals of King William III.
- Frederick I, Duke of Anhalt, accompanied by his wife, Princess Antoinette of Saxe-Altenburg, in 1891.
- Charles Floquet, ex-premier of France, chairman of the French House of Representatives, in 1892.
- Prince Roland Bonaparte, in 1895.
- Li Hongzhang, High Chancellor of China, Viceroy of Zhili, Huguang and Liangguang, politician, general and diplomat, in 1896.
- Abolqasem Naser ol-Molk (1856-1927), Persian politician, diplomat and minister, later regent of Persia (1911-1914), during his visit to The Hague in 1897 as envoy.
- Cecil Rhodes, British businessman and politician, founder of the British colony Rhodesia, in 1899.
- Maria Letizia Bonaparte, Duchess of Aosta, widow of King Amadeo I of Spain, in 1899.
- Benjamin Harrison, 23rd president of the United States, in 1899 to attend the Peace Conference.
- Grand Duke Vladimir Alexandrovich of Russia, son of Emperor Alexander II, accompanied by two of his children: Boris and Elena, in 1901.
- John Philip Sousa, American composer and conductor, in 1903.
- Maharadja Bijay Chand Mahtab of Bardhaman, with his entourage, in 1906.
- Prince Filippo Massimo Lancellotti and his wife, Princess Elisabetta Borghese Aldobrandini, in 1906.
- Austen Chamberlain, British politician, winner of the Nobel Peace Prize, in 1909.
- Prince Oskar of Prussia, son of Emperor Wilhelm II of Germany, in 1909, travelling under the name "Count of Lingen".
- Theodore Roosevelt, 26th president of the United States, in 1910.
- Archduke Franz Ferdinand of Austria, heir presumptive to Austria-Hungary, in 1911.
- Daisy, Princess of Pless, activist, writer, in 1911.
- Grand Duke Dmitri Pavlovich of Russia, in 1912, travelling under the name "Count of Strelna".
- Antônio of Orléans-Braganza, Prince of the Empire of Brazil, in 1913.
- Crown Prince Michi Hirohito, later Emperor of Japan, in 1921.
- Prince Yasuhiko Asaka and Princess Nobuko Asaka, daughter of Emperor Meiji of Japan, in 1925.
- King Faisal of Saudi Arabia, in 1926 en 1932.
- Charles King, president of Liberia, in 1927.
- Ignacy Jan Paderewski, pianist and composer, displomat, politician and former Prime Minister of Poland, in 1929.
- Henry Ford, automobile-industry magnate, in 1929 and 1930.
- Aristide Briand, Prime Minister of France, co-laureate of the 1926 Nobel Peace Prize, in 1929.
- André Tardieu, Prime Minister of France, in 1930.
- Frank B. Kellogg, American lawyer, politician and statesman who served in the U.S. Senate and as U.S. Secretary of State, winner of the 1929 Nobel Peace Prize and associate judge of the Permanent Court of International Justice in The Hague.
- Anna Pavlova, Russian prima ballerina, died in the hotel in 1931.
- William Randolph Hearst, American newspaper magnate, in 1931, 1934 and 1936.
- Prince Nicholas of Romania, in 1933.
- Joseph Bech, Prime Minister of Luxembourg, in 1934.
- Saud bin Abdulaziz Al Saud, Crown Prince and later King of Saudi Arabia, in 1935.
- Joseph Lyons, Prime Minister of Australia, in 1937.
- King Gustaf VI Adolf of Sweden, in 1937 and in 1955 with Queen Louise.
- The Yuvaraja of the Kingdom of Mysore, Kanteerava Narasimharaja Wadiyar with 45 members of staff, they lived for two months on the third floor, in 1939.
- Jean de Lattre de Tassigny, French general, commander-in-chief of Western Union Defence Organisation ground forces in Western Europe, in 1948.
- Emperor Haile Selassie of Ethiopia, in 1954.
- Eleanor Roosevelt, politician, diplomat and activist, widow of US President Franklin D. Roosevelt, in 1950.
- Eunice Kennedy Shriver, American diplomat, founder of the Special Olympics, sister of US President John F. Kennedy, in 1962.
- King Frederik IX of Denmark.
- Thomas Mann, German novelist, short story writer, social critic, philanthropist, essayist, and the 1929 Nobel Prize in Literature laureate.
- Igor Stravinsky, Russian composer, pianist and conductor.
- Dwight Eisenhower, 34th president of the United States.
- Winston Churchill, Prime Minister of the United Kingdom.
- Edward Heath, Prime Minister of the United Kingdom.
- Tony Blair, Prime Minister of the United Kingdom.
- François Mitterrand, President of France.
- Charles Lindbergh, American aviation pioneer.
- Michael Jackson, American singer, songwriter and dancer.
- Prince, eclectic American singer, songwriter, musician, record producer, and filmmaker.

== Gallery ==
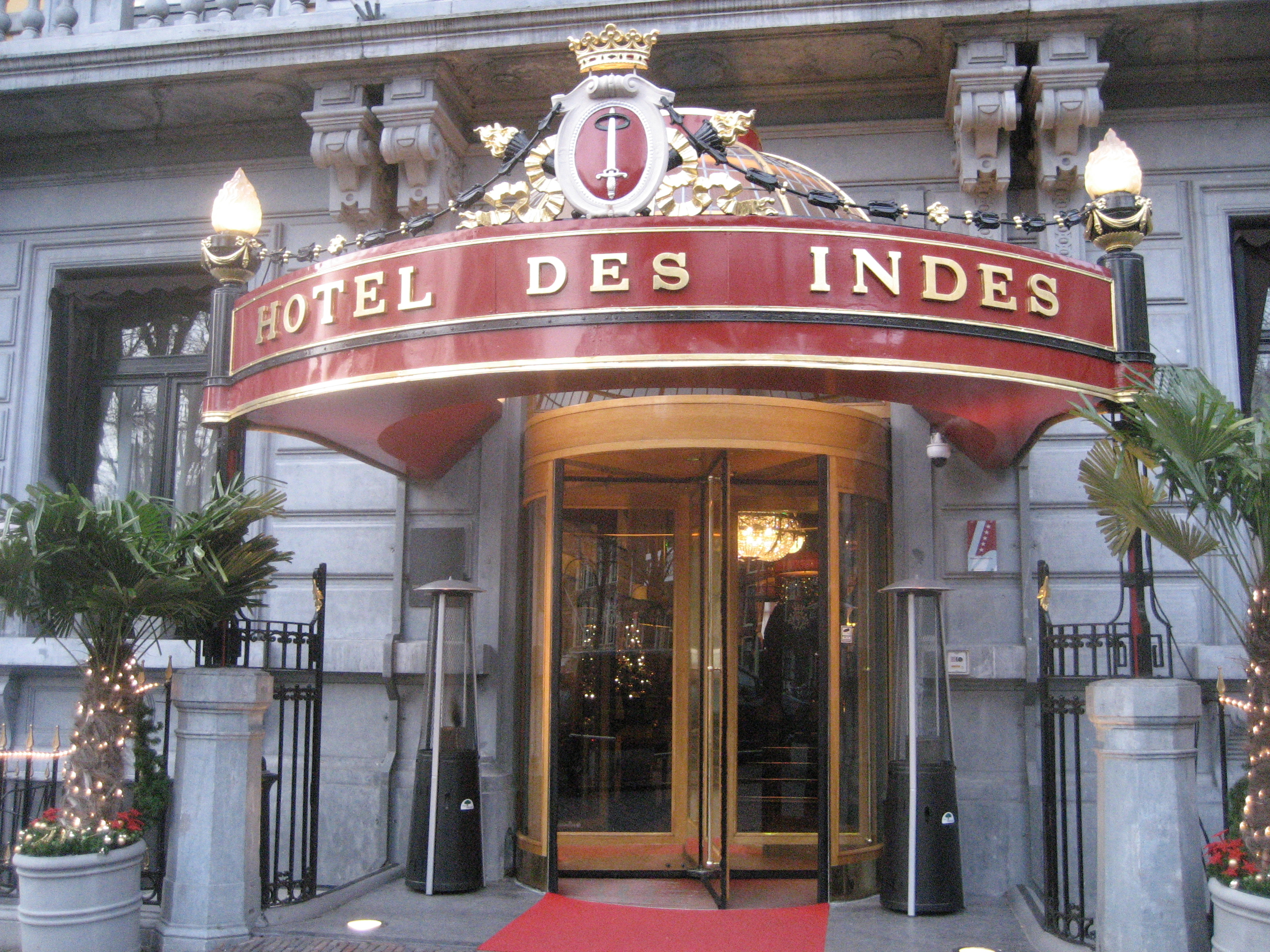
The entrance

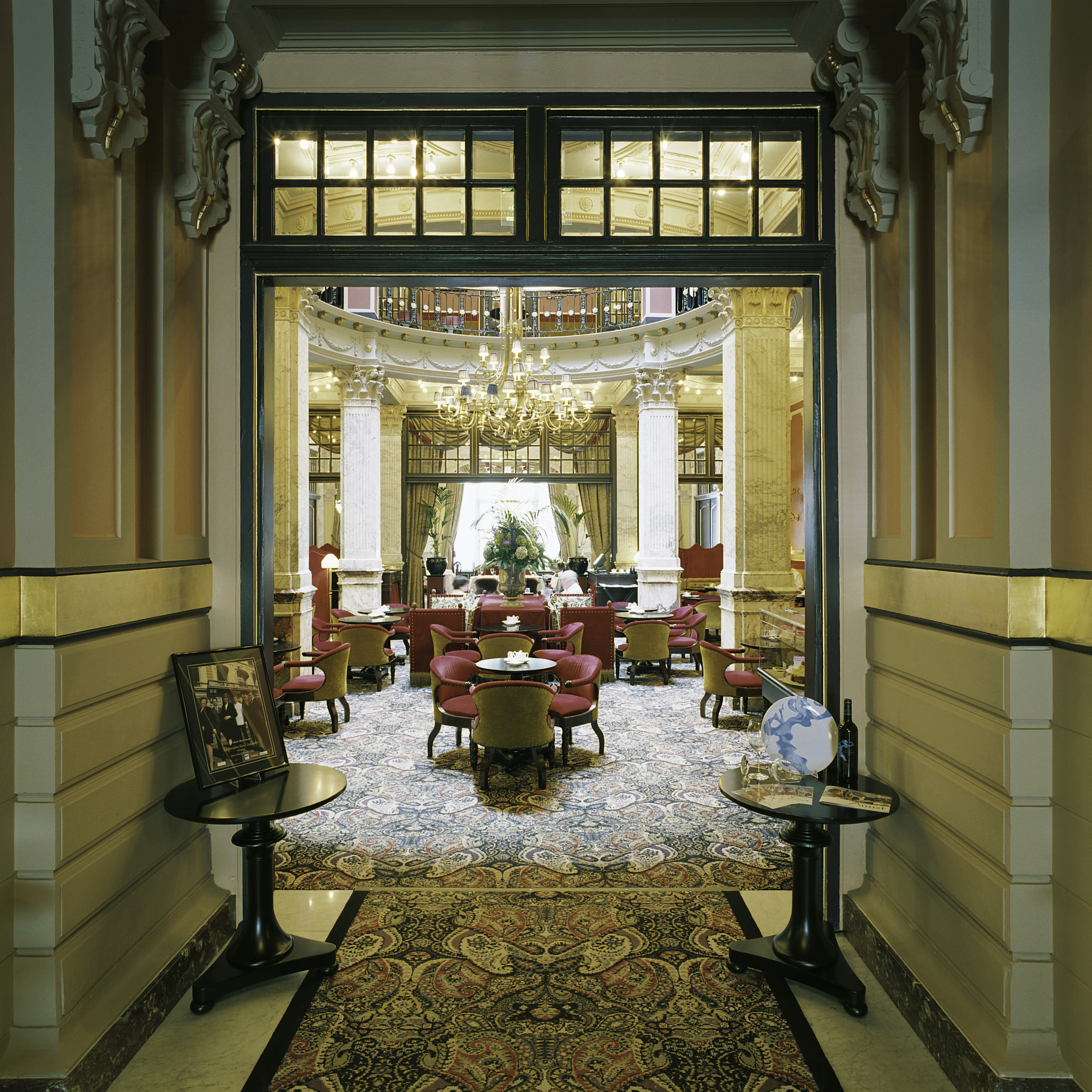
Hallway passage on ground floor level

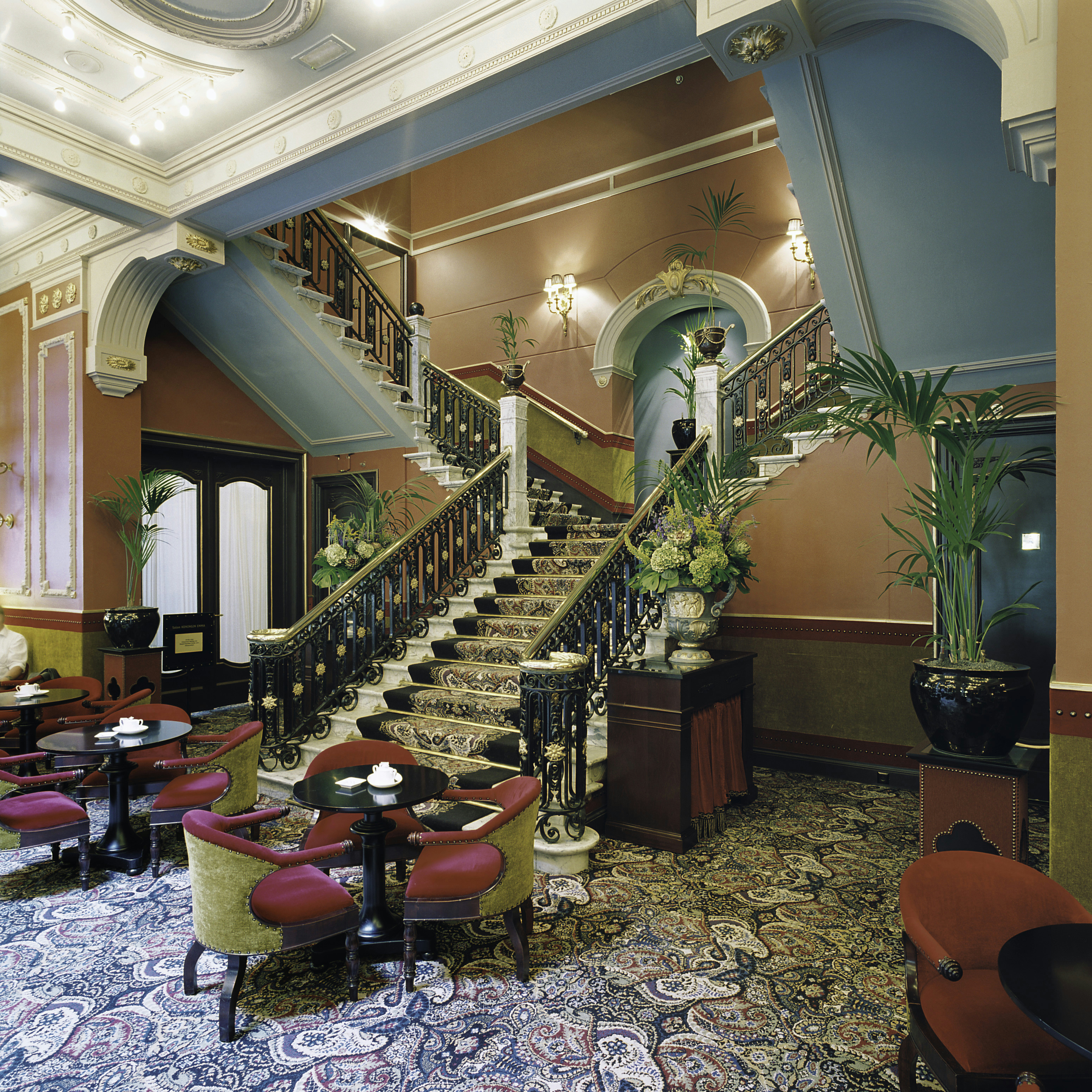
Hotel Des Indes, part of the central hall

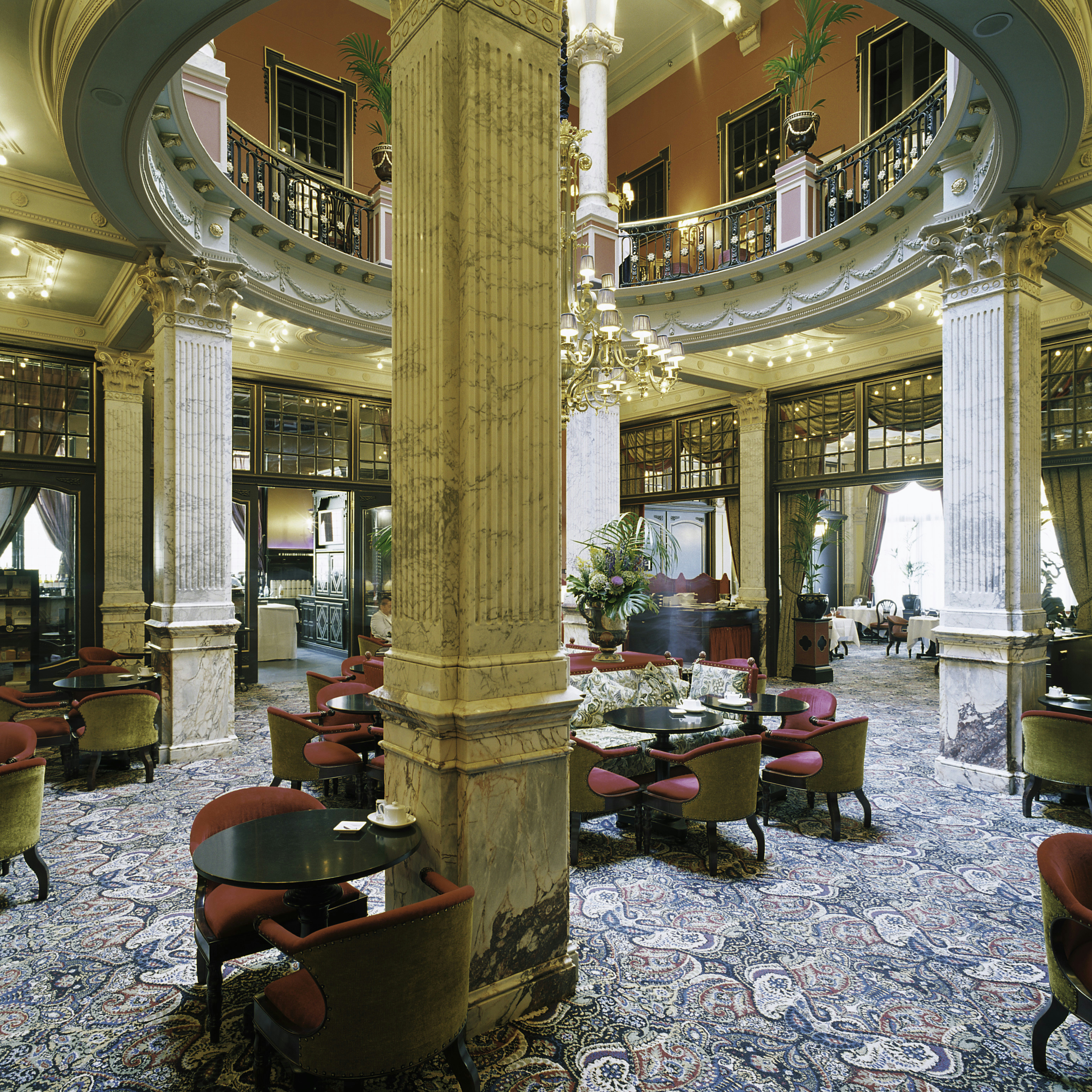
Ground floor rotunda with restaurant

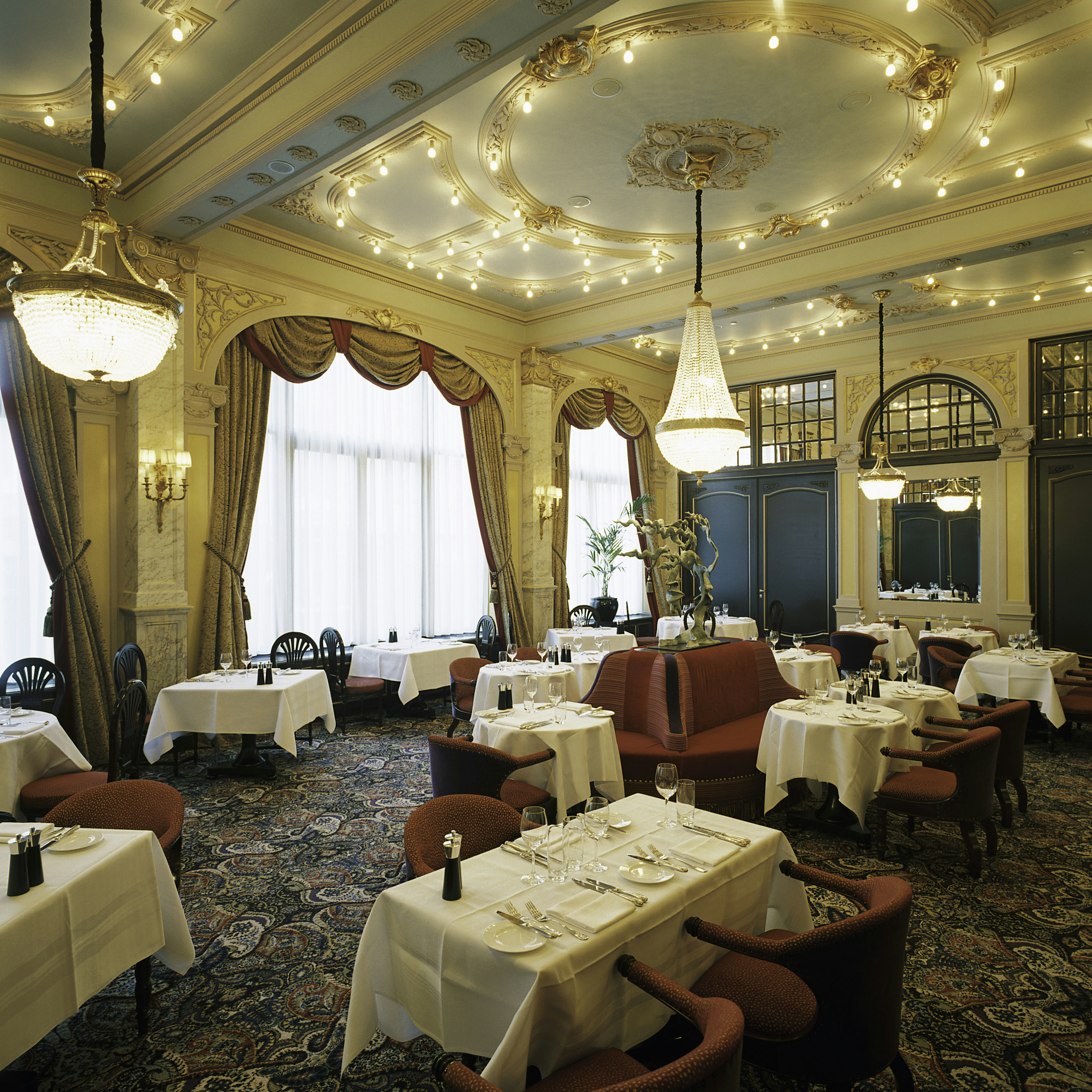
Dining hall

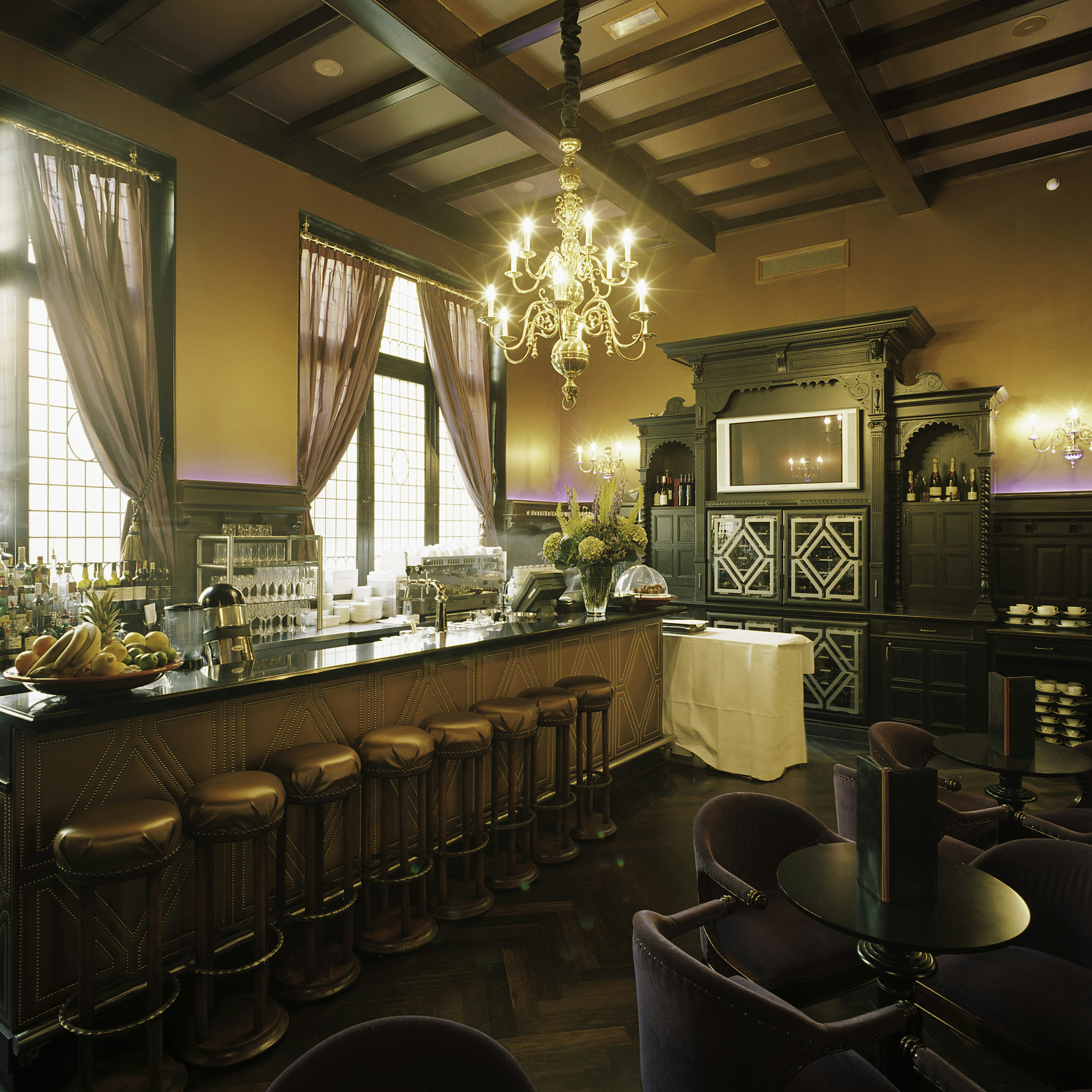
Bar

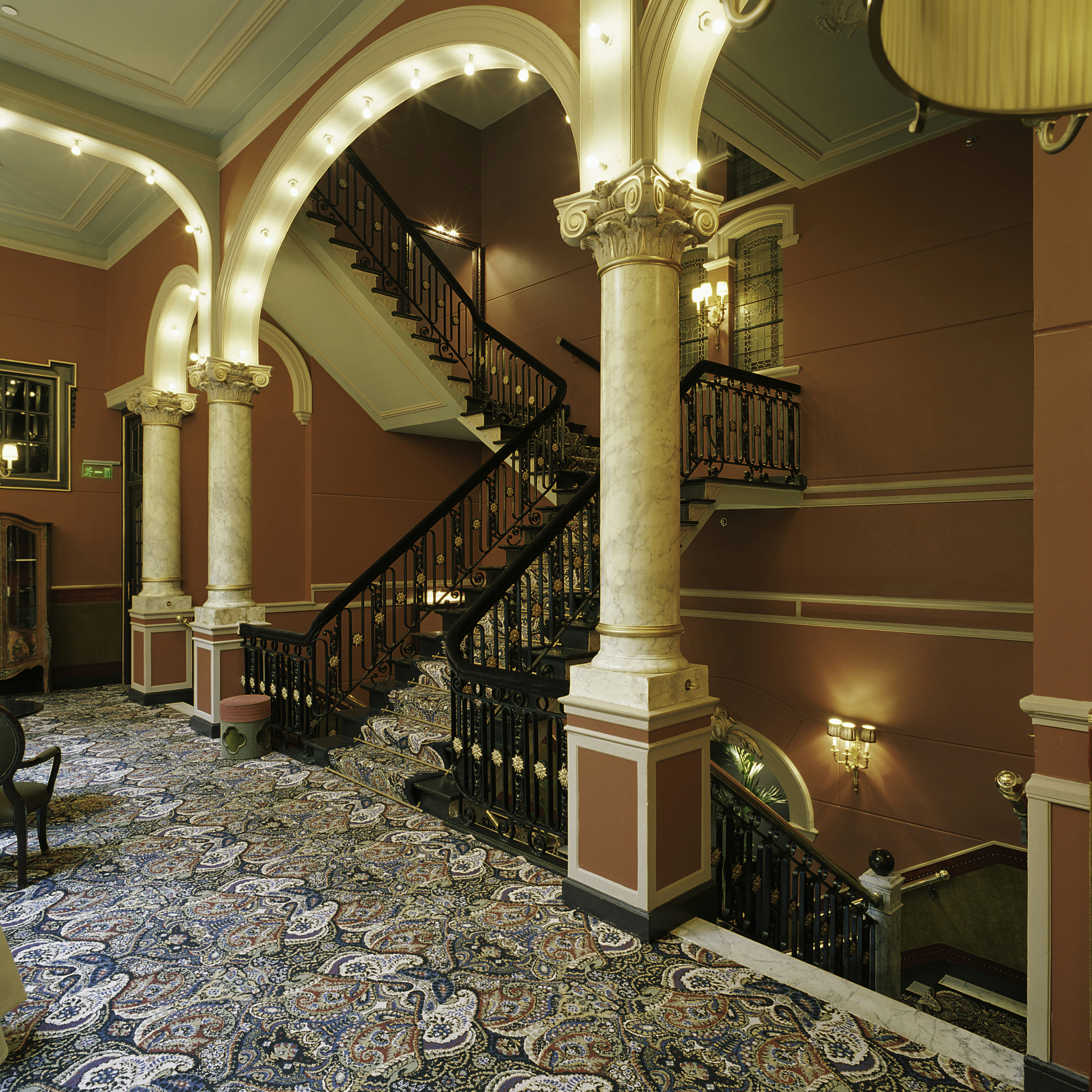
Staircase on the second floor

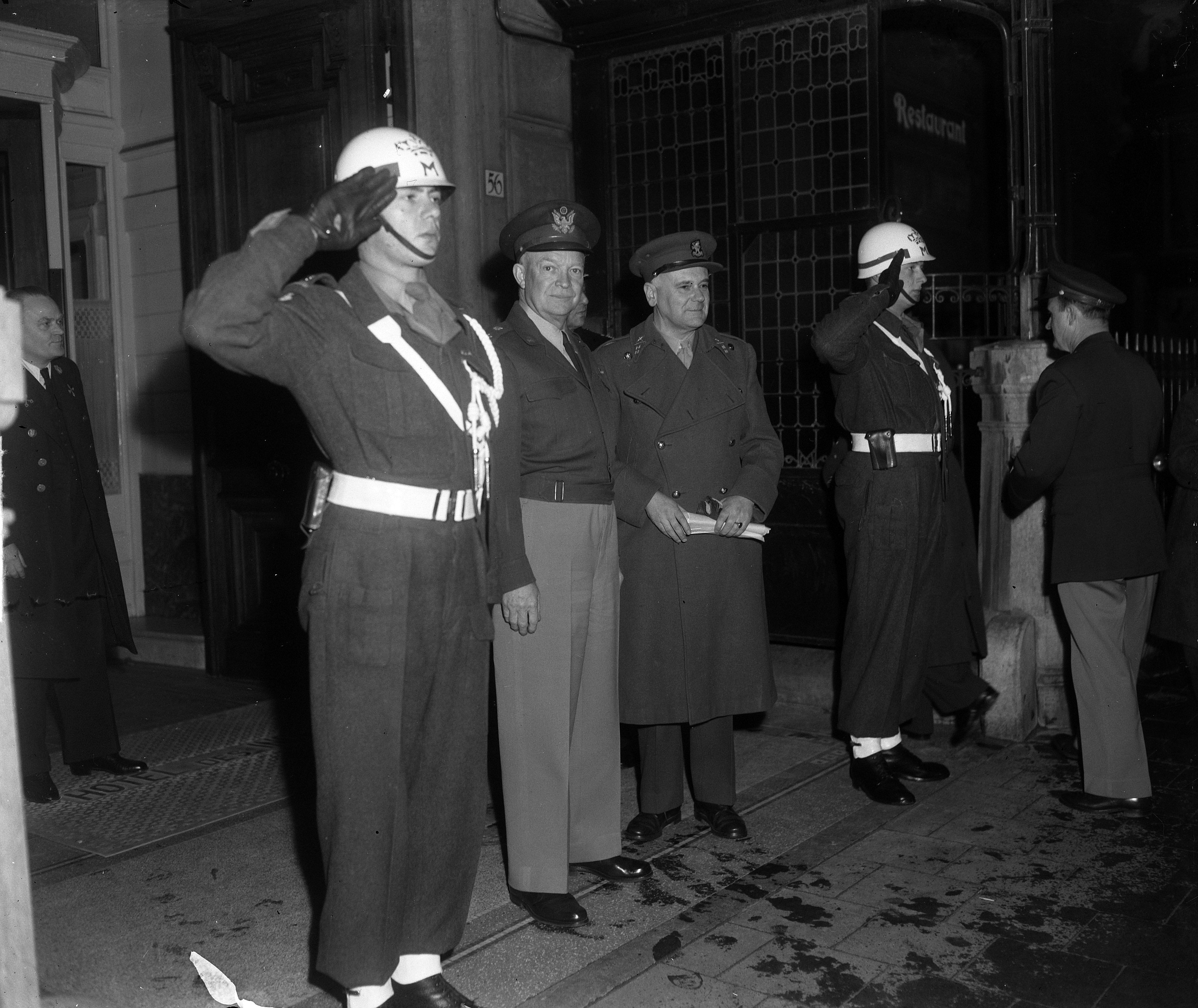
1951: Dwight Eisenhower and general Kruls leaving Hotel Des Indes
