= Saur (restaurant) =

Coordinates: 52°4′55.59″N 4°18′48.52″E

- Interactive map of Saur

Restaurant information
- Established: 1927
- Food type: French, fish
- Location: Lange Voorhout 51, The Hague, 2514 EC, Netherlands
- Website: Official website

Saur was a restaurant in The Hague, in the Netherlands. It was a fine dining restaurant that was awarded one Michelin star in both 1958 and 1959. It was again awarded a Michelin star in 1967 and retained that rating until 1989. The restaurant finally closed down in November 2013.

In the period 1982–1984, head chef was Ad van Wel.

Restaurant Saur was convicted of breaching the price regulations in 1942. During the wintertime it had charged ƒ 2,50 for a plate of pea soup, while it was only allowed to charge ƒ 1,20. Although it was moved to a higher price class before the conviction, it still had to pay a fine of ƒ 1000 (thousand guilders).

In the last days of his life, 2 May 2002, politician Pim Fortuyn was dining with friends in Restaurant Saur. A large crowd of protesters gathered in front of the restaurant. A security firm offered to protect him, but Fortuyn declined. Four days later, on 6 May, he was murdered.

== See also ==
- List of Michelin starred restaurants in the Netherlands
