= Frank B. Kellogg =

American lawyer and statesman (1856–1937)

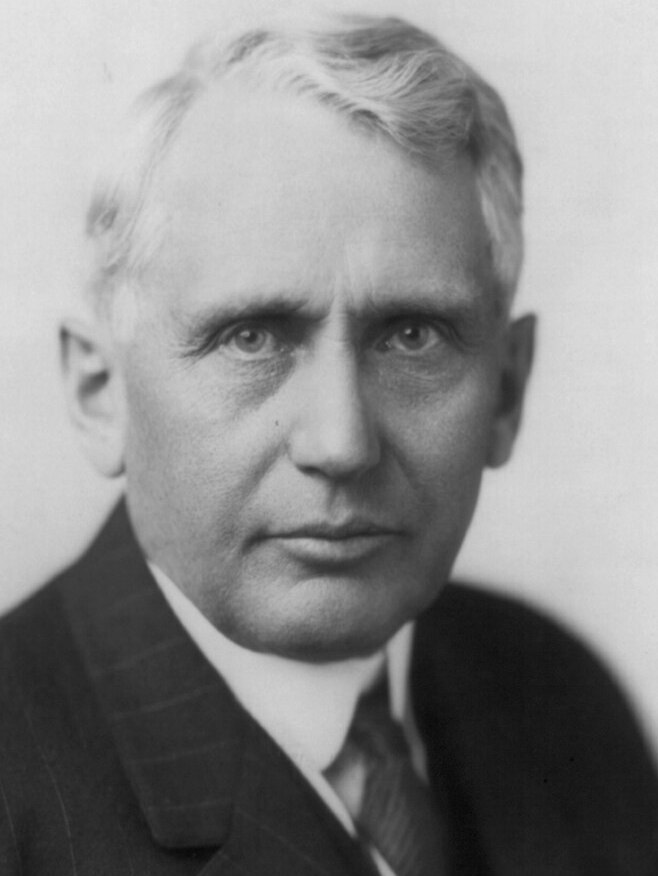
- Kellogg in 1912

Associate Judge of the Permanent Court of International Justice
- In office September 25, 1930 – September 9, 1935
- Preceded by: Charles E. Hughes
- Succeeded by: Manley O. Hudson

45th United States Secretary of State
- In office March 5, 1925 – March 28, 1929
- President: Calvin Coolidge; Herbert Hoover
- Preceded by: Charles Evans Hughes
- Succeeded by: Henry L. Stimson

39th United States Ambassador to the United Kingdom
- In office January 14, 1924 – February 10, 1925
- President: Calvin Coolidge
- Preceded by: George Harvey
- Succeeded by: Alanson B. Houghton

United States Senator from Minnesota
- In office March 4, 1917 – March 3, 1923
- Preceded by: Moses E. Clapp
- Succeeded by: Henrik Shipstead

County Attorney of Olmsted County
- In office January 1, 1882 – January 1, 1887
- Preceded by: Halfton A. Eckholdt
- Succeeded by: Burt W. Eaton

City Attorney of Rochester
- In office 1878–1881
- Preceded by: Royal H. Gove
- Succeeded by: W. Logan Breckenridge

Personal details
- Born: Frank Billings Kellogg; December 22, 1856 Potsdam, New York, U.S.
- Died: December 21, 1937 (aged 80) St. Paul, Minnesota, U.S.
- Party: Republican
- Spouse: Clara Cook
- Awards: Nobel Peace Prize 1929 Legion of Honour

Frank Billings Kellogg (December 22, 1856 – December 21, 1937) was an American lawyer, politician, and statesman who served in the U.S. Senate and as U.S. Secretary of State. He co-authored the Kellogg–Briand Pact, for which he was awarded the Nobel Peace Prize in 1929.

== Early life and career ==
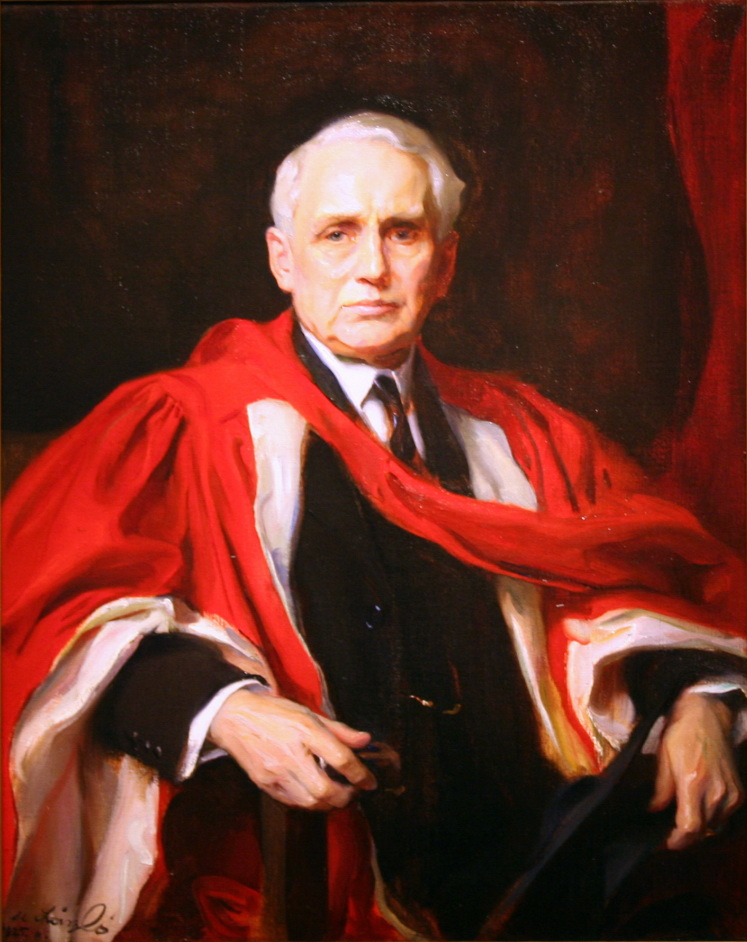
Portrait of Kellogg by Philip de László.

Kellogg was born in Potsdam, New York, on December 22, 1856, the son of Abigail (Billings) and Asa Farnsworth Kellogg. His family moved to Minnesota in 1865.

Kellogg read law and began practicing law in Rochester, Minnesota, in 1877. He served as city attorney of Rochester 1878–1881 and county attorney for Olmsted County, Minnesota, from 1882 to 1887. He moved to St. Paul, Minnesota, in 1886.

In 1905, Kellogg joined the federal government when Theodore Roosevelt asked Kellogg to prosecute a federal antitrust case. In 1906, Kellogg was appointed special counsel to the Interstate Commerce Commission for its investigation of E. H. Harriman. In 1908, he was appointed to lead the federal prosecution against Union Pacific Railroad, under the Sherman Antitrust Act. His most important case was Standard Oil Co. of New Jersey v. United States, 221 U.S. 1 (1911). Following this successful prosecution, he was elected president of the American Bar Association (1912–1913). He was a member of the World War Foreign Debts Commission.

In 1907, Kellogg was honored as a Compatriot of the Minnesota Society of the Sons of the American Revolution.

=== United States Senate ===
In 1916, Kellogg was elected as a Republican to the United States Senate from Minnesota and served from March 4, 1917, to March 3, 1923, in the 65th, 66th, and 67th Congresses. During the ratification battle for the Treaty of Versailles, he was one of the few Republicans who supported ratification. He lost his re-election bid in 1922 and, in 1923, he was a delegate to the Fifth International Conference of American States at Santiago, Chile.

=== Ambassador to Great Britain ===
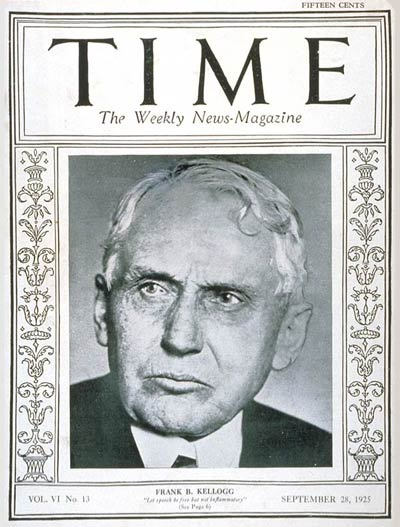
Time cover, September 28, 1925

In 1924, he was appointed by President Calvin Coolidge as Ambassador Extraordinary and Plenipotentiary to Great Britain, serving from January 14, 1924, to February 10, 1925. He succeeded George Brinton McClellan Harvey who served under Warren G. Harding and was succeeded by Alanson B. Houghton so that Kellogg could assume the role of Secretary of State.

== Secretary of State ==
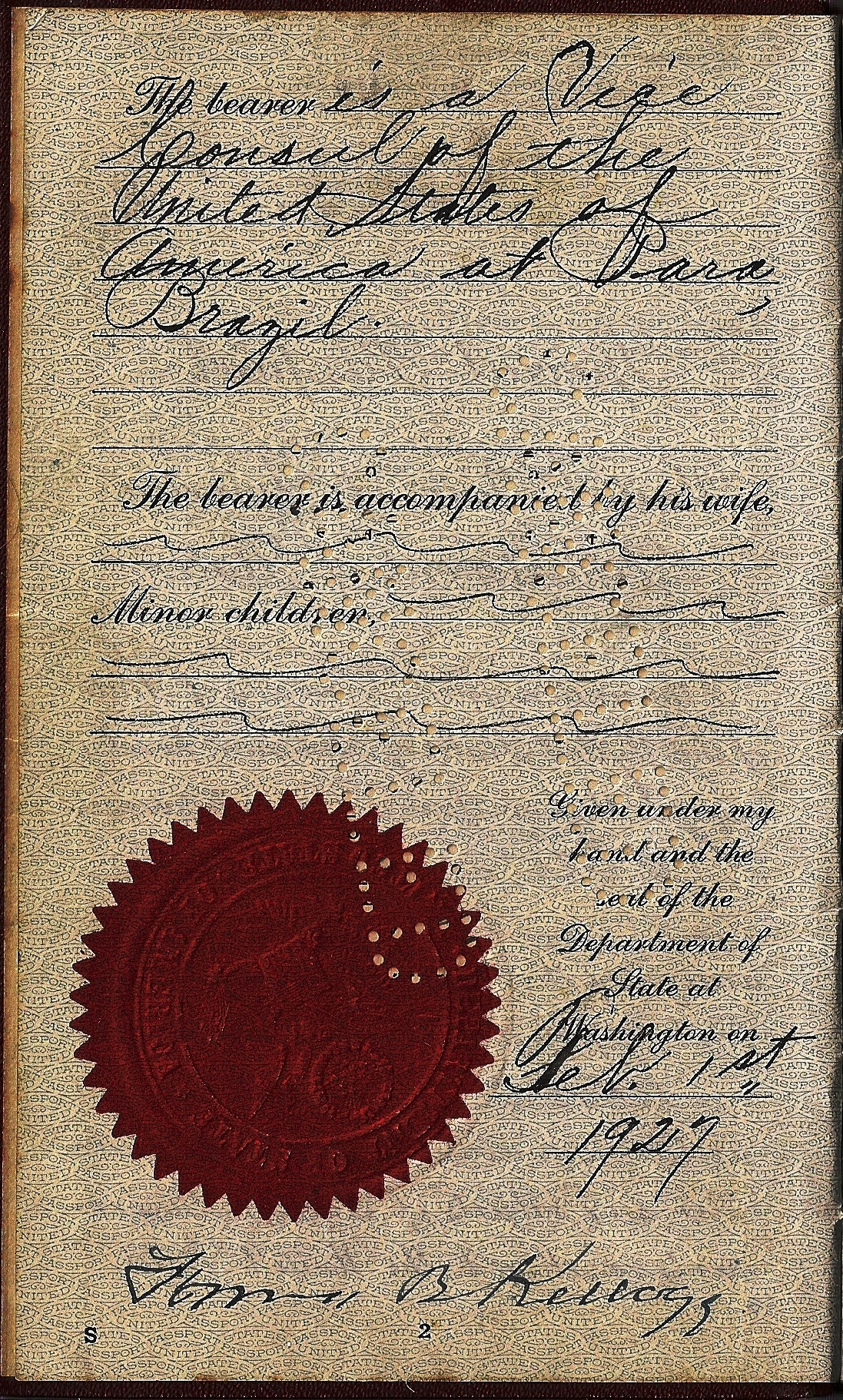
1927 hand signed passport by Frank B. Kellogg as Secretary of State

From 1925 to 1929, he served as the United States Secretary of State in the Cabinet of President Coolidge. In 1928, he was awarded the Freedom of the City in Dublin, Ireland and in 1929 the government of France made him a member of the Legion of Honour.

As Secretary of State, he was responsible for improving U.S.–Mexican relations and helping to resolve the long-standing Tacna–Arica controversy between Peru and Chile. His most significant accomplishment, however, was the Kellogg–Briand Pact, signed in 1928. Proposed by its other namesake, French foreign minister Aristide Briand, the treaty intended to provide for "the renunciation of war as an instrument of national policy." Kellogg was awarded the 1929 Nobel Peace Prize in recognition. (Briand had already won the Nobel Peace Prize in 1926).

He was associate judge of the Permanent Court of International Justice from 1930 to 1935.

He was elected to the American Philosophical Society in 1931.

Kellogg was self-conscious about his lack of academic credentials; he attended a one-room country school and dropped out at age 14. He never attended high school, college or law school. His only advanced training came from clerking in a private lawyer's office. Kellogg grew up on a poor farm in Minnesota, and lacked a commanding presence or the sophistication to deal with the aristocrats who dominated European diplomacy. As Secretary of State, his main focus was Latin America, where he dealt with brutal but unsophisticated strongmen. His staff provided the ideas, and they appreciated that he was always open, candid, and easy to communicate with. He helped end the battle between the Mexican government and the Catholic Church, but failed to resolve the dispute over ownership of the oil reserves. In the Far East, he followed the advice of Nelson Trusler Johnson, the new chief of the Division of Far Eastern Affairs. They favored China and protected it from threats from Japan. They successfully negotiated tariff reform with China, thereby giving enhanced status to the Kuomintang and helping get rid of the unequal treaties. As for Europe he was primarily interested with expanding the limitations on naval armaments that had been established by the Washington Treaty; he made little progress. Kellogg gained international fame, and the Nobel Peace Prize, with the Kellogg–Briand Pact. It was endorsed by nearly every nation and made starting a war a punishable criminal action. It formed the legal basis for the trial and execution of German and Japanese war leaders after 1945.

== Personal life ==
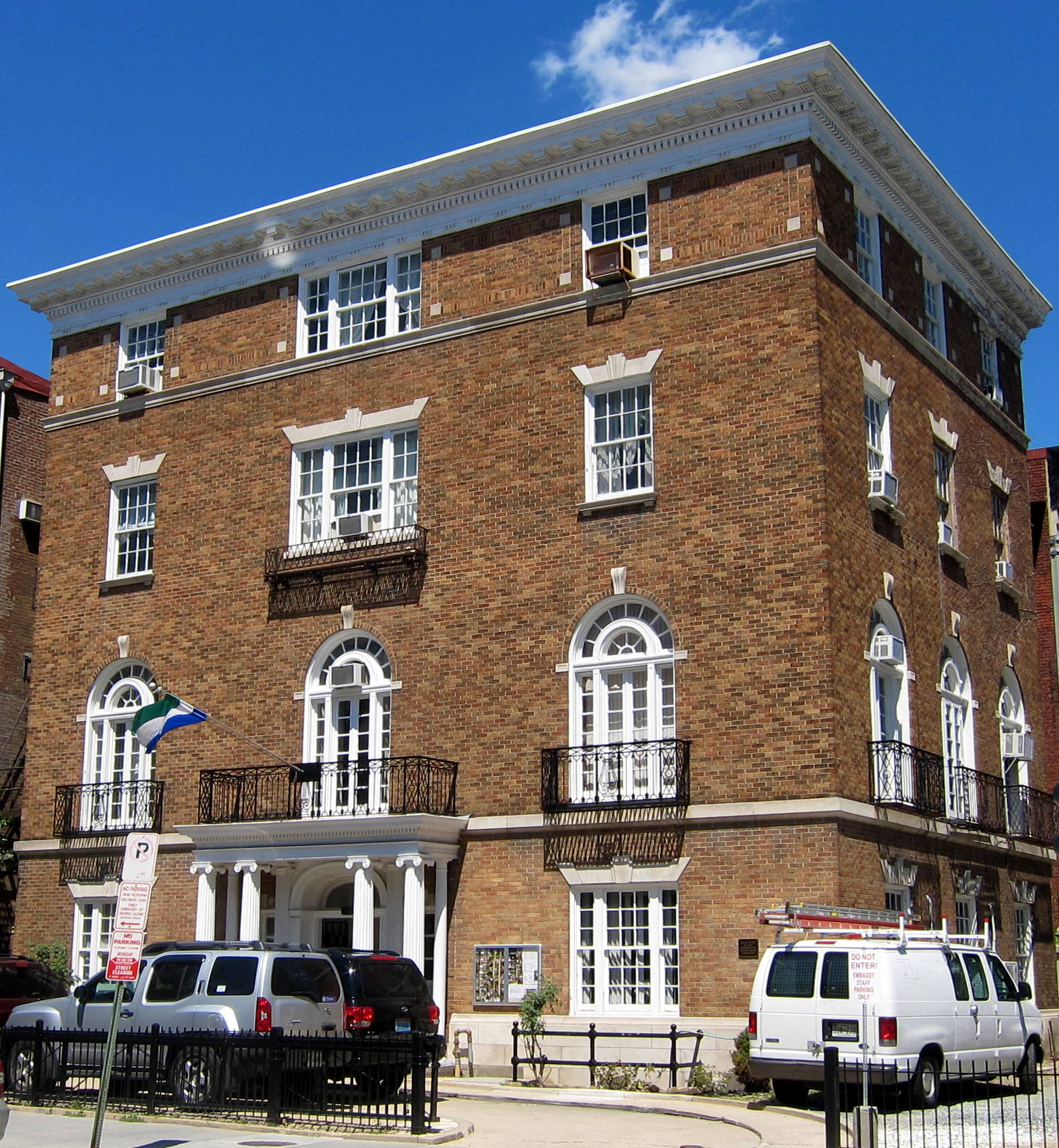
Kellogg's former residence in Washington, D.C.

In 1886, Kellogg married Clara May Cook (1861–1942), the daughter of George Clinton Cook (1828–1901) and Elizabeth (née Burns) Cook (1838–1908).

In 1880, he became a member of the Masonic Lodge Rochester No. 21, where he received the degrees of freemasonry on April 1, April 19, and May 3.

He died from pneumonia, following a stroke, in St. Paul on December 21, 1937, the eve of his 81st birthday. He was buried at the Chapel of St. Joseph of Arimathea in Washington National Cathedral, Washington, D.C.

=== Legacy ===
In 1937, he endowed the Kellogg Foundation for Education in International Relations at Carleton College, where he was a trustee. His house in St. Paul, the Frank B. Kellogg House was listed as a National Historic Landmark in 1976.

The following were named in his honor:

- Kellogg Boulevard in downtown Saint Paul.
- Kellogg Middle School in Shoreline, Washington, and Rochester, Minnesota, as was Frank B. Kellogg High School (closed 1986) in Little Canada, Minnesota, which had been a part of Roseville School District 623.
- A Liberty ship, the SS Frank B. Kellogg

=== Papers ===
Frank B. Kellogg's papers are available for research use at the Minnesota Historical Society. They include correspondence and miscellaneous papers, State Department duplicates, news clippings scrapbooks, awards, floor plans, honorary degrees, maps, memorials and memoranda.

== See also ==
- List of people on the cover of Time magazine: 1920s

Party political offices
First	Republican nominee for U.S. Senator from Minnesota (Class 1); 1916, 1922	Succeeded by Arthur E. Nelson
U.S. Senate
Preceded by Moses E. Clapp	U.S. Senator (Class 1) from Minnesota; 1917–1923; Served alongside: Knute Nelson	Succeeded by Henrik Shipstead
Diplomatic posts
Preceded by George Harvey	United States Ambassador to the United Kingdom; 1924–1925	Succeeded by Alanson B. Houghton
Political offices
Preceded by Charles Evans Hughes	United States Secretary of State; 1925–1929	Succeeded by Henry L. Stimson
