= Embassy of the United Kingdom, The Hague =

British Embassy, The Hague
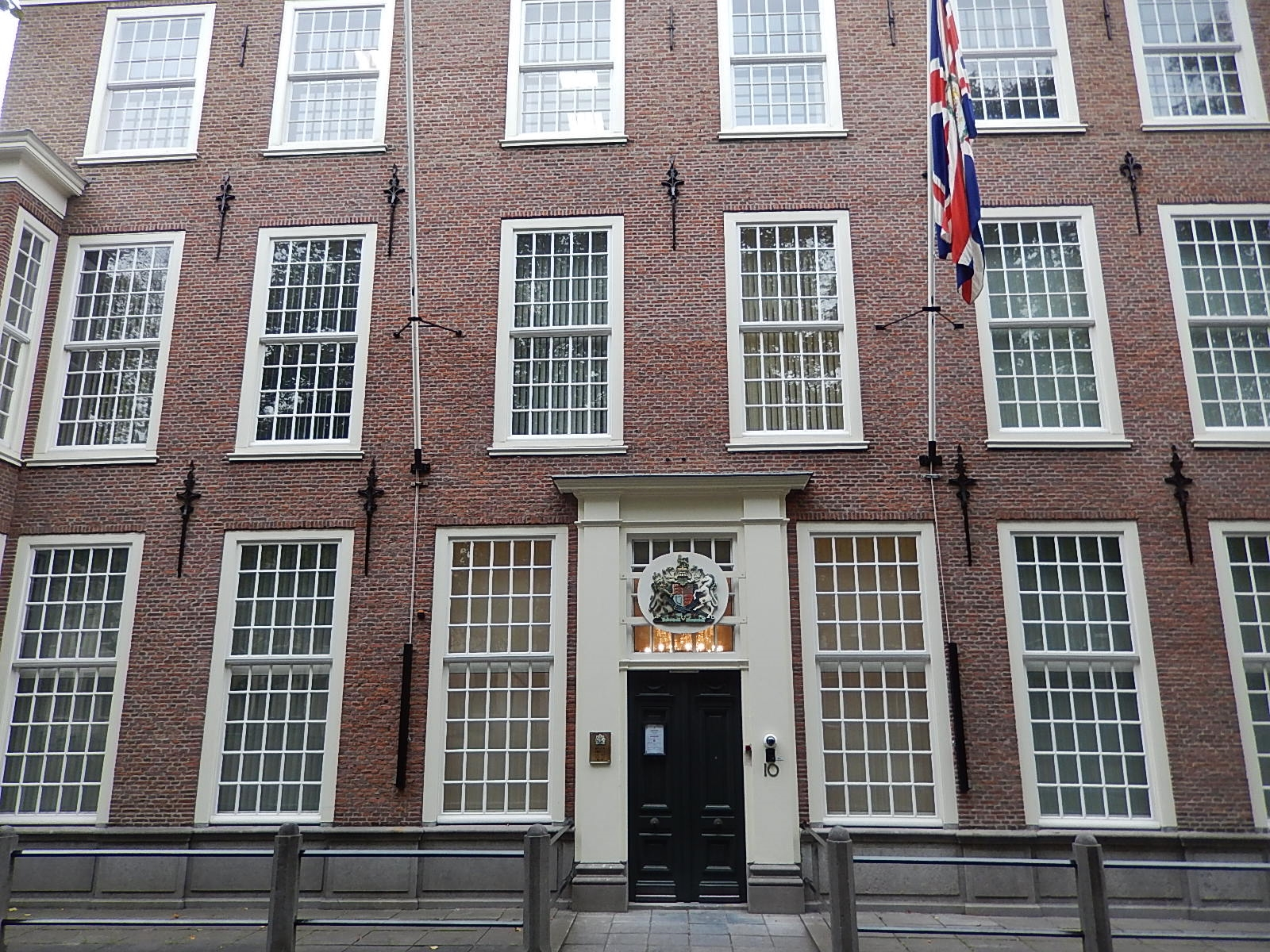
- The Embassy building in The Hague
- Location: The Hague, Netherlands
- Address: Lange Voorhout 10, 2514 ED The Hague, Netherlands
- Coordinates: 52°4′56″N 4°18′38″E
- Ambassador: Chris Rampling
- Website: British Embassy, The Hague

The Embassy of the United Kingdom in The Hague is the chief diplomatic mission of the United Kingdom in the Kingdom of the Netherlands. The embassy is located on one of the most famous streets in the Netherlands, Lange Voorhout, in the Centrum. The current British Ambassador to the Netherlands is Chris Rampling CMG MBE.

Since the formation in 1997 of the Organisation for the Prohibition of Chemical Weapons (OPCW), which is located in The Hague, the British Ambassador to the Netherlands has also been the UK's Permanent Representative to the OPCW.

Until 2020, the UK maintained a British consulate general in Amsterdam, after which the consular services provided moved permanently to The Hague. The embassy and consulate general also represent the British Overseas Territories in the Netherlands.

== History ==
The British diplomatic mission in The Hague was established at 12 Hooge Westeinde in 1861, leased by minister Sir Andrew Buchanan and functioned as both the offices and residence of the legation. The mission was elevated to embassy status in 1919.

In 1979, the British ambassador Sir Richard Sykes and a Dutch embassy employee, Karel Straub, were assassinated in an Irish Republican Army attack outside the residence.

Due to structural issues and maintenance costs, the embassy vacated Hooge Westeinde in 1984. A new ambassadorial residence was acquired at 1 Plein 1813, originally built in 1863 for Dutch finance minister Agnites Vrolik, and it became the official residence later that year.

== Gallery ==
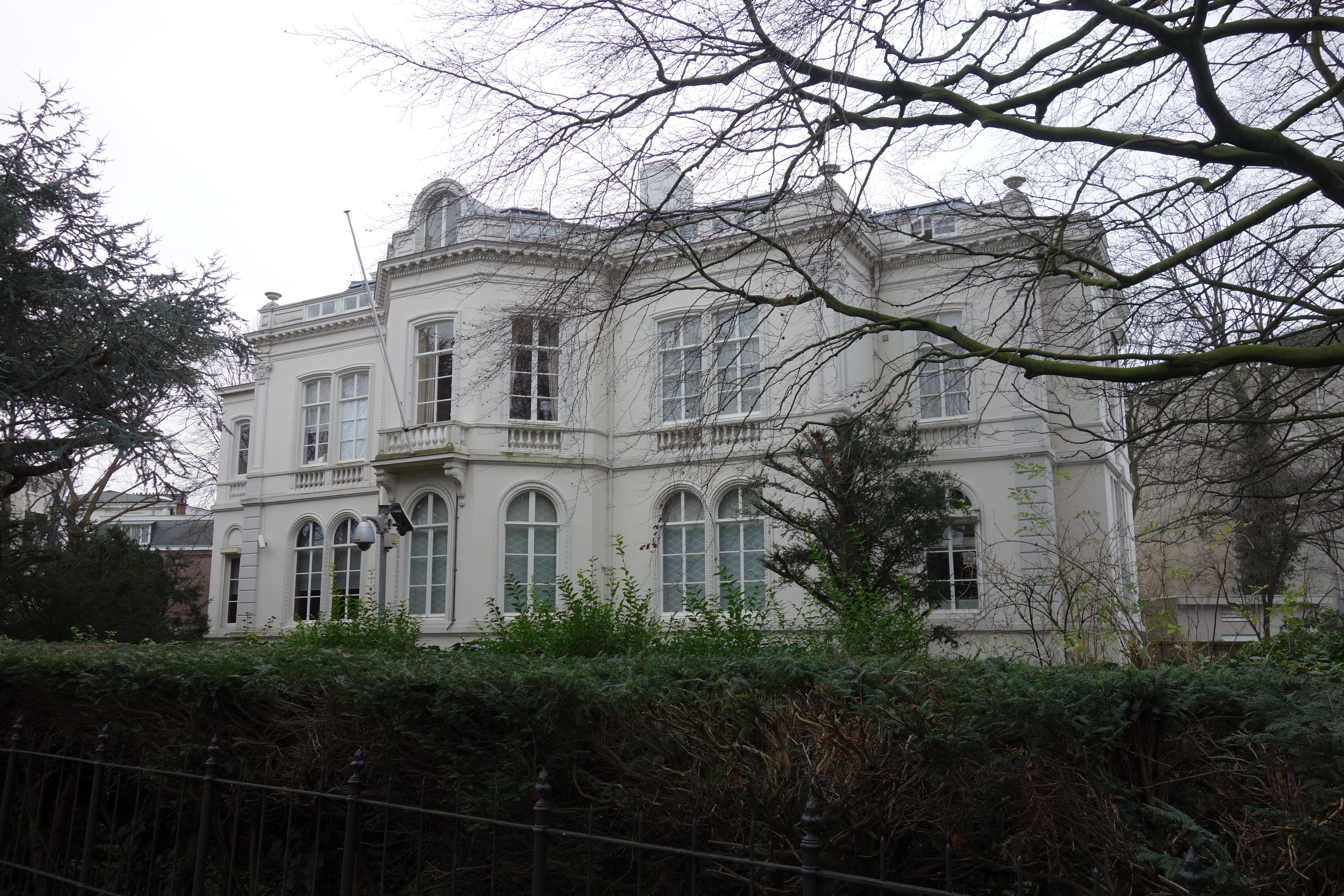
Ambassador's residence

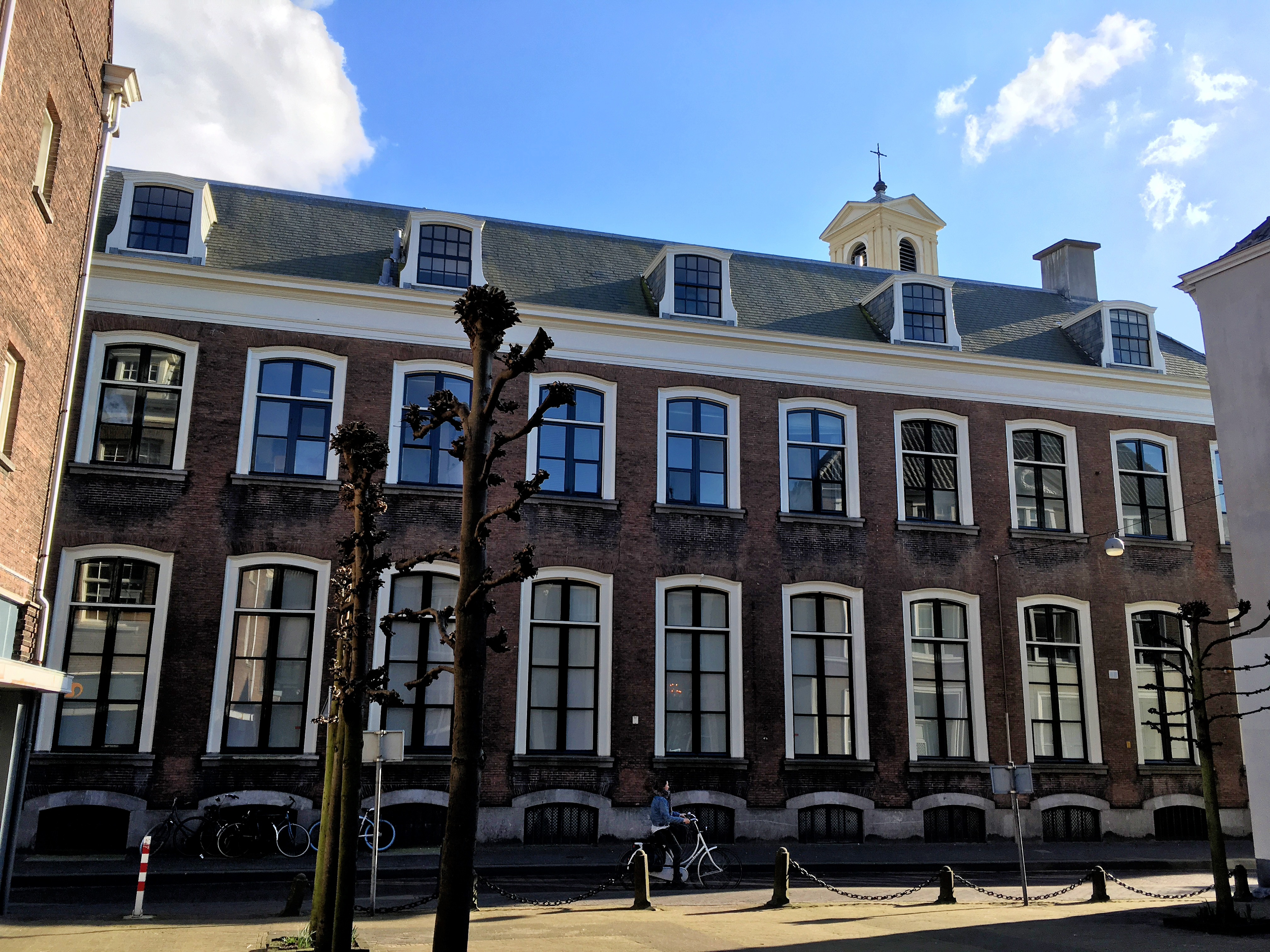
Former British embassy, 12 Westeinde

== See also ==
- Netherlands–United Kingdom relations
- List of diplomatic missions in the Netherlands
- List of diplomats of the United Kingdom to the Netherlands
- Embassy of the Netherlands, London
