= Netherlands–United Kingdom relations =

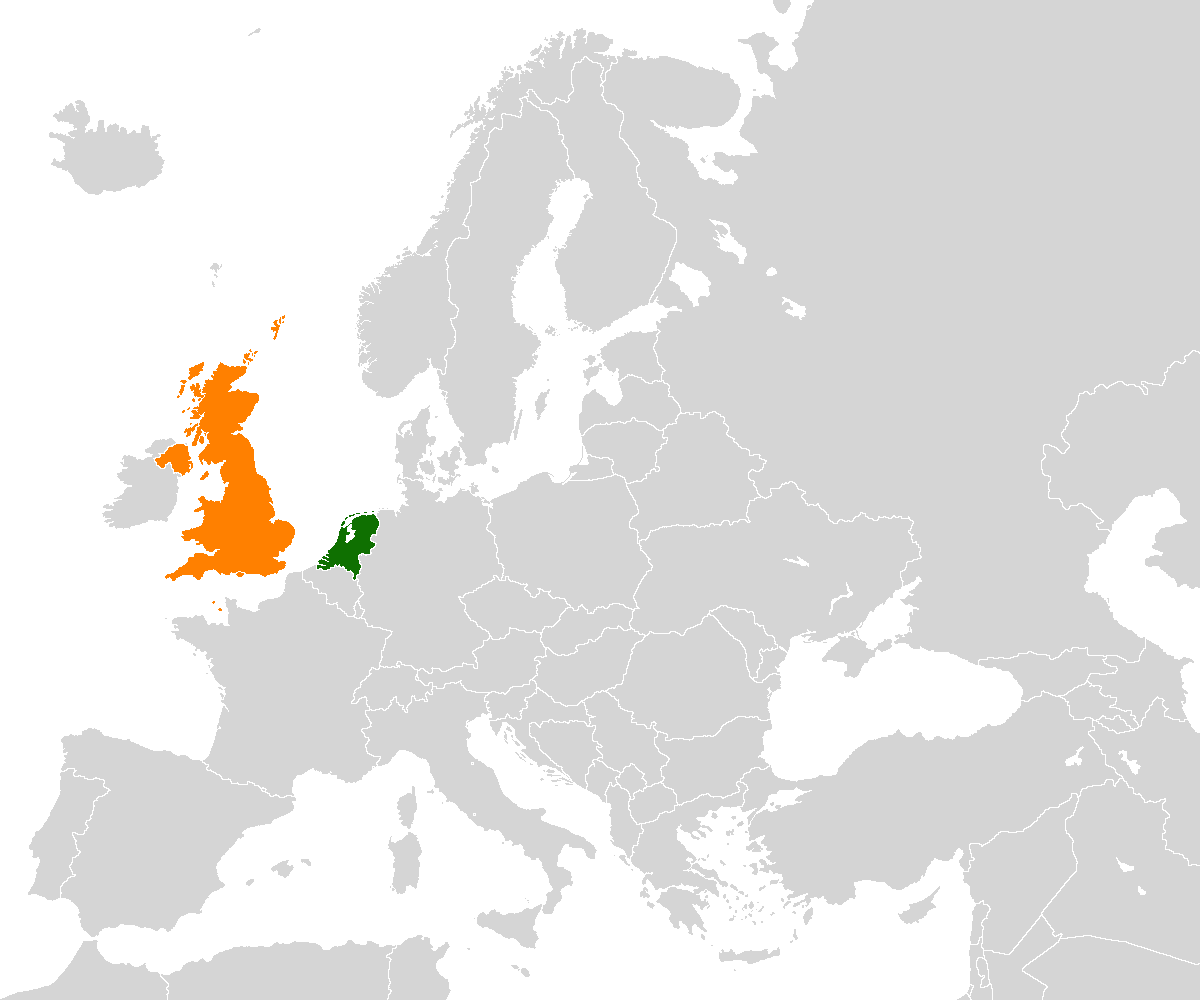

- Netherlands: United Kingdom

Diplomatic mission
- Embassy of the Netherlands, London: Embassy of the United Kingdom, The Hague

Envoy
- Ambassador Laetitia van den Assum: Ambassador Joanna Roper

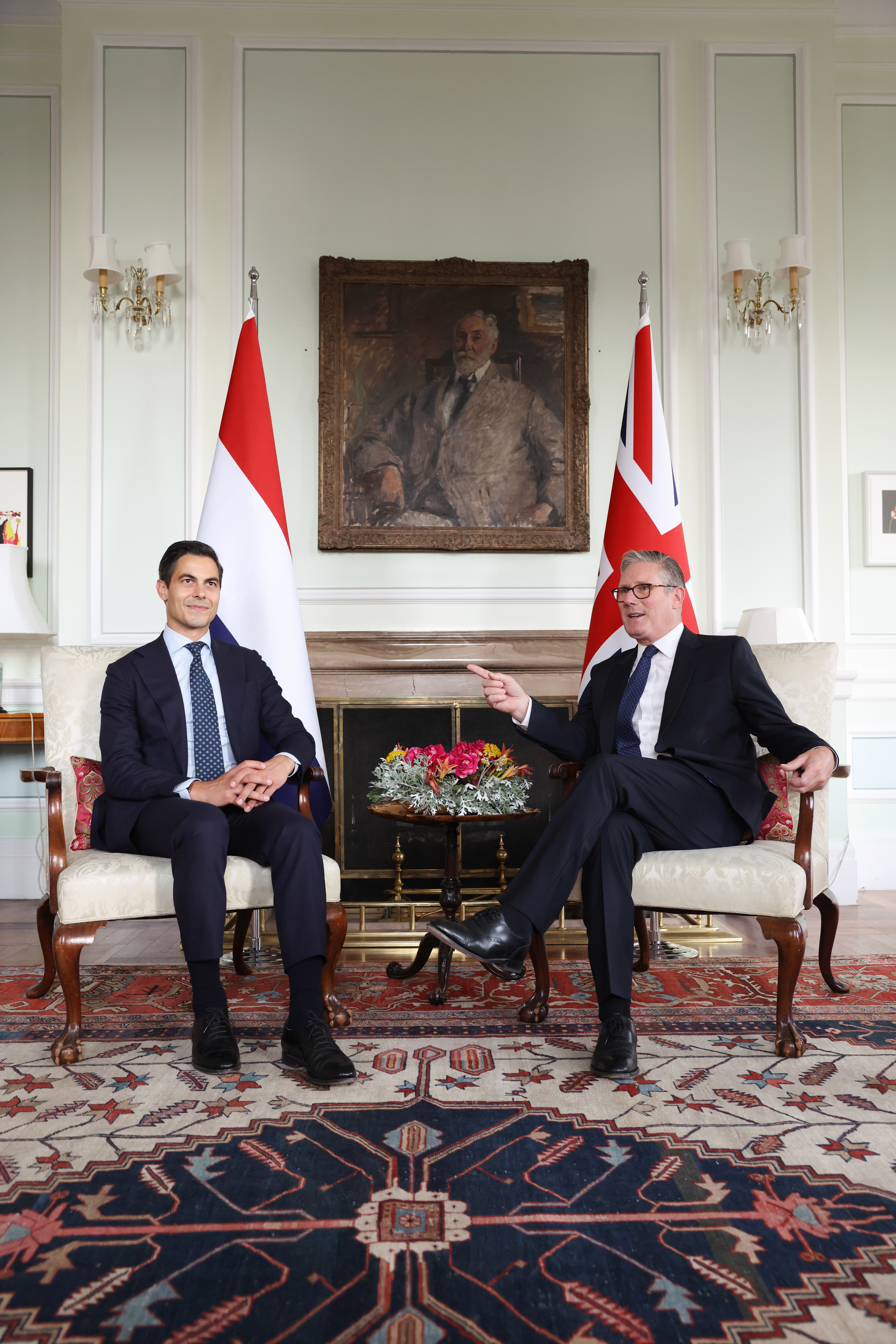
Dutch Prime Minister Rob Jetten with British Prime Minister Keir Starmer in Türkiye, July 2026.

Netherlands–United Kingdom relations encompass the diplomatic, economic, and historical interactions between the Kingdom of the Netherlands and the United Kingdom of Great Britain and Northern Ireland.

Over forty Dutch towns and cities are twinned with British towns and cities. Both English and Dutch are West Germanic languages, with West Frisian, a minority language in the Netherlands, being the closest relative of the English language if one excludes Scots. In addition, between 90% and 93% of people in the Netherlands claim to speak English, although a negligible percentage of British people can speak Dutch. The division of Southeast Asia (between Singapore as its colonial power and Indonesia as the Dutch East Indies) and South Africa as the Cape of Good Hope between the British and the Dutch colonial empires were largely solidified by the Anglo-Dutch Treaty of 1814 and the 1824, which permanently mapped out their global spheres of influence.

The Netherlands has an embassy in London, and the United Kingdom has an embassy in The Hague. The UK also has a consulate in Willemstad, Curaçao.

Both countries share common membership of the Atlantic Co-operation Pact, the Council of Europe, NATO, the OECD, the OSCE, the United Nations, and the World Trade Organization. Bilaterally the two countries have a Double Taxation Convention. the Netherlands is a European Union member and the United Kingdom is a former European Union member.

== History ==
=== Early modern relations ===
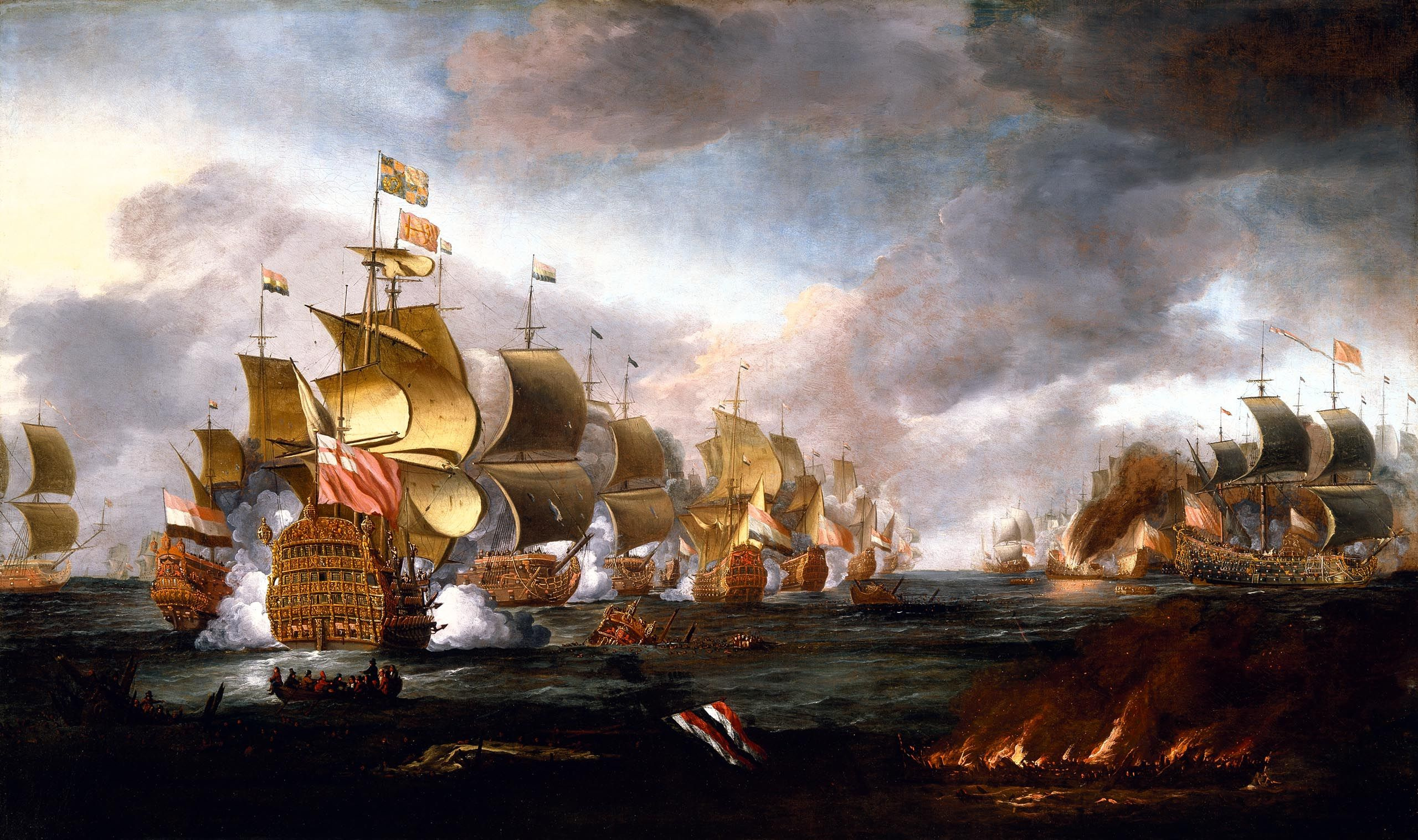
A painting of the battle of Lowestoft between the English and Dutch navies during the Second Anglo-Dutch War by Adriaen van Diest.

In the mid-seventeenth century, after the Dutch had made peace in their war of independence from Spain and the former Kingdoms of England, Scotland and Ireland were being united under Cromwell's Commonwealth, Oliver St John was sent to Holland to moot the possibility of unifying the Dutch Republic with the Commonwealth, as fellow Protestant, seafaring republics, though the plan did not come to pass.

The Anglo-Dutch wars were battles between England (and the Kingdom of Great Britain during the fourth war) and the Dutch Republic during the 17th and 18th centuries. There were four wars in total, two were won by each side, and ended with the Fourth Anglo-Dutch War. The wars were largely fought to secure trade routes and to enable colonial expansion.

=== Glorious Revolution ===
The Glorious Revolution, also called the Revolution of 1688, was the overthrow of King James II of England (VII of Scotland and II of Ireland) in 1688 by a union of English MPs with an invading army led by the Dutch Republic stadtholder William III of Orange-Nassau (William of Orange) who, as a result, ascended the English throne as William III of England.

The crisis besetting King James II came to a head in 1688, when the King fathered a son, James Francis Edward Stuart on 10 June (Julian calendar), until then the throne would have passed to his daughter, Mary, a Protestant and the wife of William of Orange. The prospect of a Catholic dynasty in the kingdoms was now likely. Already troubled by the King's Catholicism and his close ties with France, key leaders of the Tories united with members of the opposition Whigs and set out to resolve the crisis by inviting William of Orange to England.

As a result of the Glorious Revolution, Anglo-Dutch relations entered a new era as the two nations were bound together by a shared sovereign. Despite the fact that anti-Dutch sentiment continued to be widespread among the English public, England and the Dutch Republic fought together in the Nine Years' War (1688-97) and the War of the Spanish Succession (1701-14).

=== Fourth Anglo-Dutch War ===
As the 18th century went on, however, the Dutch gradually became the junior partner in the relationship, setting the stage for a deterioration in Anglo-Dutch relations. With the deterioration of Britain's relations with its Thirteen Colonies in North America and the outbreak of the American Revolutionary War in 1775, the Dutch provided indirect aid to the Americans, selling them arms. The British attempted to stop Dutch trade with them, leading to the Britain declared war in the conflict known as the Fourth Anglo-Dutch War (1780-83).

=== Eight Articles of London ===
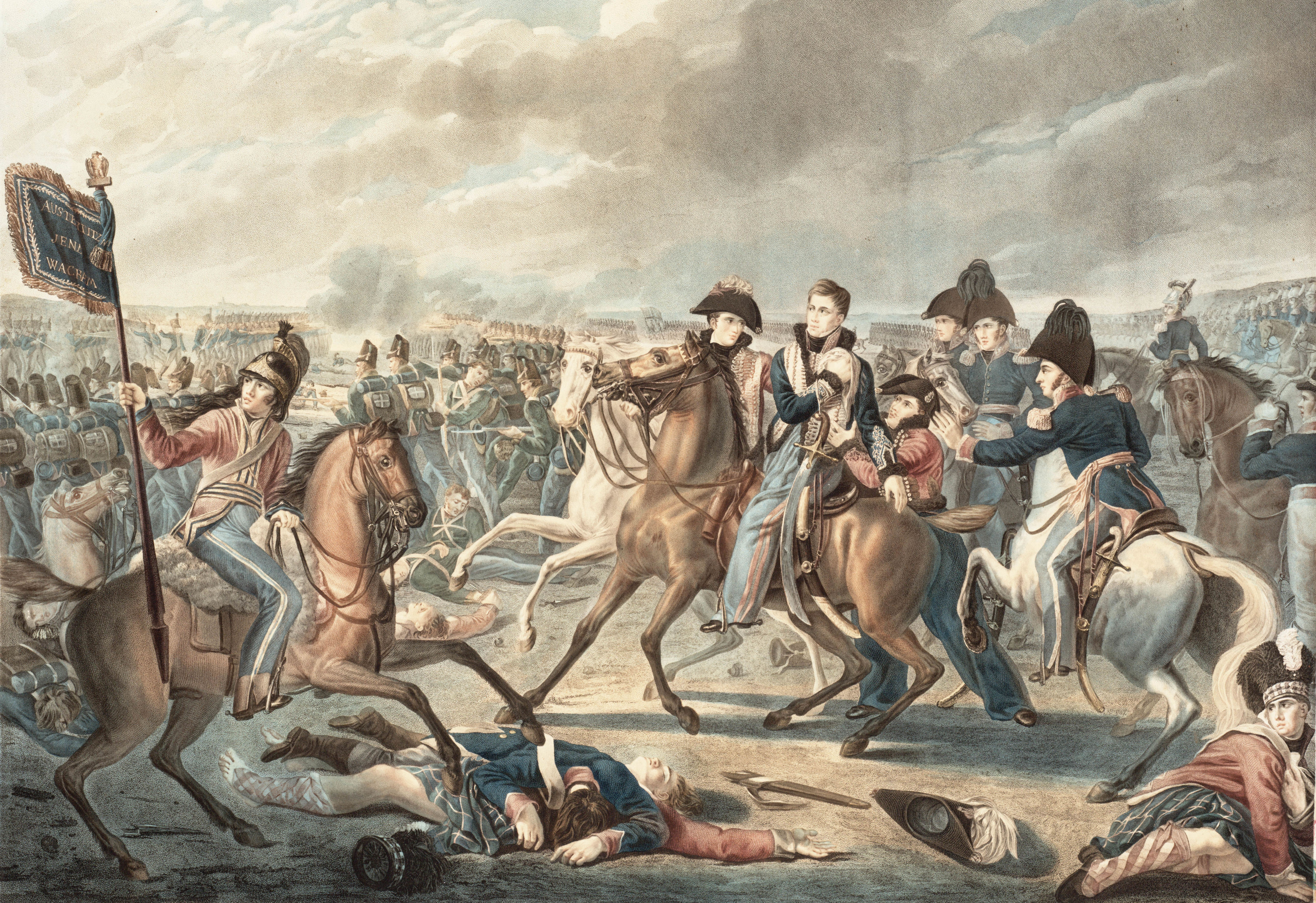
Prince William of Orange wounded at Waterloo, 1815

The Eight Articles of London, also known as the London Protocol of 21 June 1814, were a secret convention between the Great Powers: United Kingdom of Great Britain and Ireland, Prussia, Austria, and Russia to award the territory of current Belgium and the Netherlands to William I of the Netherlands, then "Sovereign Prince" of the United Netherlands. He accepted this award on 21 July 1814.

=== Anglo-Dutch Treaty of 1814 ===
The Anglo-Dutch Treaty of 1814 (also known as the Convention of London) was signed between the United Kingdom and the Netherlands in London on 13 August 1814. It was signed by Robert Stewart, Viscount Castlereagh, for the British and Hendrik Fagel for the Dutch.

The treaty returned the colonial possessions of the Dutch as they were at 1 January 1803 before the outbreak of the Napoleonic Wars, in the Americas, Africa, and Asia with the exceptions of the Cape of Good Hope and the South American settlements of Demerara, Essequibo, and Berbice, where the Dutch retained trading rights. In addition, the British ceded to the Dutch Bangka Island in the Indonesian Archipelago in exchange for the settlement of Kochi and its dependencies on the coast of Malabar, in India. The Dutch also ceded the district of Barnagore, situated close to Calcutta, in exchange for an annual fee. The treaty noted a declaration of 15 June 1814, by the Dutch that ships for the slave trade were no longer permitted in British ports and it agreed that this restriction would be extended to a ban on involvement in the slave trade by Dutch citizens. Britain also agreed to pay £1,000,000 to Sweden to resolve a claim to the Caribbean island of Guadeloupe (see Guadeloupe Fund). The British and the Dutch agreed to spend £2,000,000 each on improving the defences of the Low Countries. More funds, of up to £3,000,000, are mentioned for the "final and satisfactory settlement of the Low Countries in union with Holland." Disputes arising from this treaty were the subject of the Anglo-Dutch Treaty of 1824.

=== Anglo-Dutch Treaty of 1824 ===
The Anglo-Dutch Treaty of 1824, also known as the Treaty of London (one of several), was signed between the United Kingdom and the United Kingdom of the Netherlands in London in March 1824. The treaty sought to resolve disputes arising from the execution of the Anglo-Dutch Treaty of 1814. For the Dutch, it was signed by Hendrik Fagel and Anton Reinhard Falck, and for the UK, George Canning and Charles Williams-Wynn.

=== British and Dutch Colonizations ===
The Dutch East India Company (VOC) dominated the region from its founding in 1602 until its dissolution in 1799. The Dutch government then nationalized its possessions, forming the Dutch East Indies in 1800. Britain seized the Cape Colony from the Dutch during the Napoleonic Wars to secure sea routes to India, making the occupation permanent in 1806, as the British had already significantly expanded their influence around Bombay, solidifying their presence following the Second Anglo-Maratha War. Britain first occupied the Cape Colony in 1795 and formally acquired it in 1814. Batavia (now Jakarta) served as the VOC's administrative capital and the center of its Asian trading network. It remained under Dutch control for roughly 330 years until 1949. Sir Stamford Raffles established a British trading post on the island on 6 February 1819, after signing a treaty with Sultan Hussein Shah of Johor. It was chosen for its strategic location at the mouth of the Malacca Strait. By 1824, it was officially ceded to the British East India Company (EIC). During the First Opium War, the British won the Second Battle of Chuenpi on 7 January 1841, which has led to the Convention of Chuenpi, where the British took formal possession of Hong Kong Island on 26 January that same year. The cession was later formalized in the 1842 Treaty of Nanjing. The territory of Hong Kong remained a British colony until it was handed back to China in 1997. The British imported large numbers of Chinese, Indian, Javanese and Malay workers to Singapore and the wider British Malaya for its booming plantation. Once the British secure the eastern frontier against the Xhosa tribes, the British government sponsored thousands of immigrants, most notably the 1820 Settlers, who were placed in the Albany district near the Great Fish River alongside the existing populations of Boers (Afrikaners) and indigenous groups (Bantu). Following the 1843 annexation of Natal as a British colony, the British established a sugar cane industry but faced a labor shortage. The local Zulu population largely resisted working on colonial plantations. Between 1860 and 1911, the British brought over 150,000 indentured laborers from India to work on sugar plantations, coal mines, and railways. In 1882, British forces occupied Egypt following the Anglo-Egyptian War to secure the Suez Canal and protect financial interests. Although technically part of the Ottoman Empire, Egypt became a "veiled protectorate" under effective British control. In 1884, during the Scramble for Africa by Chancellor Otto von Bismarck, Germany officially declared present-day Namibia a German protectorate, known as German South West Africa. It was Germany’s only colony considered suitable for large-scale white settlement, leading thousands of German settlers to move there for farming and mining. After the Second Boer War had ended with a decisive victory for the British Empire, the four British colonies of Cape Colony, Natal Colony, Transvaal Colony, and Orange River Colony unified to form the Union of South Africa on 31 May 1910 as a self-governing dominion like Canada and Australia. The devastating Herero and Namaqua genocide by German forces along with their African troops known as the Schutztruppe had already occurred, establishing a brutal colonial precedent by the Germans, the South African forces invaded German South West Africa in 1914 to seize strategic assets like radio stations and harbors during World War I until the German forces had surrendered to South Africans on 9 July 1915 after the Battle of Otavi, when the former German territory became a mandate of South African rule until 21 March 1990 during the Namibian War of Independence. The British and Indian forces fought the Ottoman Empire in the Mesopotamian campaign which occupied the territory that became modern Iraq, including the capture of Baghdad in March 1917. While South Africa itself became the system of Apartheid era that was completely enforced which became institutionalized racial segregation and white minority rule in South Africa that lasted from 26 May 1948 until 27 April 1994 when Nelson Mandela declared South Africa as the first multi-racial democratic election known as Freedom Day for a public holiday.

=== World War II ===
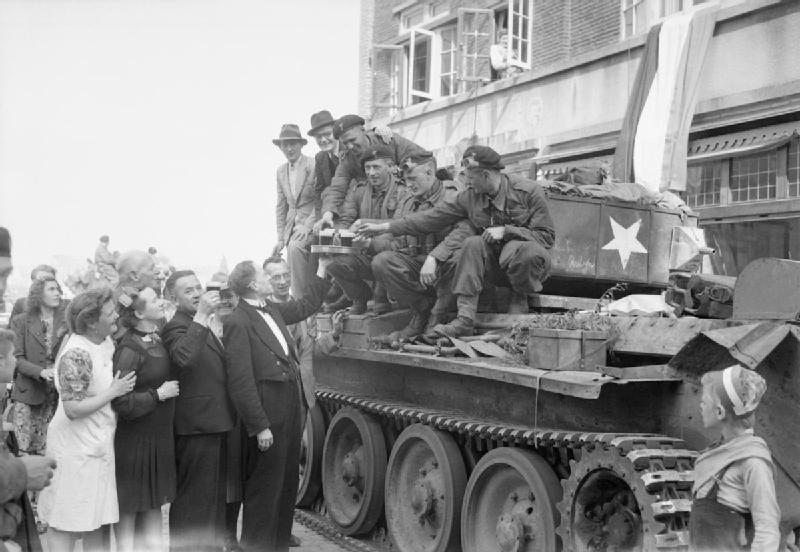
The crew of a Cromwell tank is welcomed by Dutch civilians in Eindhoven, 19 September 1944

During World War II, the United Kingdom and the Netherlands were close allies. After the German occupation of the Netherlands, Queen Wilhelmina and the Dutch government found refuge in Britain. The Royal Netherlands Navy brought most of its ships to England.

A few Dutch pilots escaped and joined the Royal Air Force to fight in the Battle of Britain. In July 1940, two all-Dutch squadrons were formed with Royal Netherlands Navy personnel and Fokker seaplanes from the Dutch naval air service: 320 Squadron and 321 Squadron (which afterwards moved to Sri Lanka). In 1942, the Allied position in Southeast Asia collapsed as Singapore fell to the Japanese on 15 February, resulting in the largest surrender of British-led personnel in history. That same year, the Dutch East Indies also fell, following the surrender of Dutch colonial forces on 8 March that same year. In 1943, an all-Dutch fighter squadron was formed in the UK, 322 Squadron. Throughout the Second World War, the South African forces, once part of the British Empire as well as the British Dominion were heavily engaged against Fascist Italy in North Africa during the campaign, serving alongside the British and Commonwealth troops. In North Africa, Nazi Germany intervened with the Afrika Korps to bolster the faltering Italian effort, leading to a protracted desert war that only concluded with an Allied victory in May 1943. With Nazi Germany surrendered unconditionally in May 1945, which declared V-E Day as a celebration on 8 May and has marked the end of World War II in Europe. In the Pacific, the United States dropped two atomic bombs between 6 and 9 August 1945, which has led the announcement of the Japanese surrender that marked the end of the Second World War. Singapore was officially returned to British rule on 12 September 1945, while the Dutch East Indies began a transition toward independence, with nationalists proclaiming the Republic of Indonesia on 17 August 1945 from Dutch rule. The Malayan Communist Party (MCP) led a violent insurgency from 1948 to 1960, which significantly influenced the British decision to grant independence to the region to counter communist appeals. The Federation of Malaya declared independence from Britain on 31 August 1957, Singapore gained internal self-governance from Britain in 1959, with Lee Kuan Yew becoming its first Prime Minister. On 16 September 1963, Singapore merged with the Federation of Malaya, Sarawak and North Borneo (Sabah) to form the new nation of Malaysia which declared as Malaysia Day. The Malaysian Parliament voted to separate Singapore from the Federation. Singapore officially became an independent and sovereign republic on 9 August 1965.

== Political relationship ==
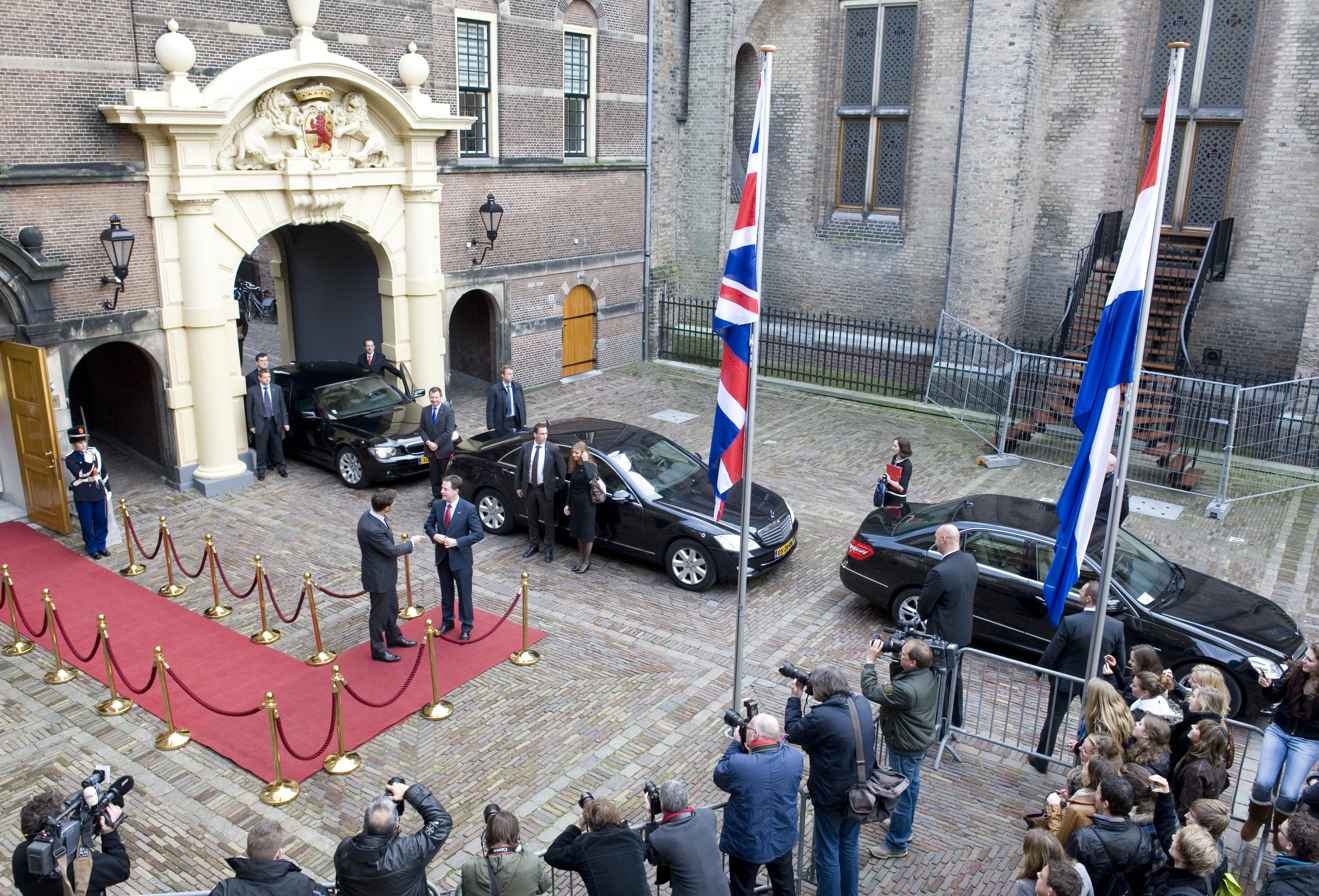
Dutch Prime Minister Mark Rutte meets Britain's then-Deputy Prime Minister Nick Clegg at the Binnenhof in The Hague.

Maritime boundary between the United Kingdom (Anguilla) and the Netherlands (Saba, Sint Maarten) in the Lesser Antilles

The United Kingdom and the Netherlands are both countries that are run under a constitutional monarchy. King Willem-Alexander of the Netherlands is around 890th in line to the British throne.

The United Kingdom and the Netherlands co-operate on a project to help people living in the developing world adapt to climate change.

The Infrared Astronomical Satellite was the first-ever space-based observatory to perform a survey of the entire sky at infrared wavelengths. Launched in 1983, its mission lasted ten months. The telescope was a joint project of the Netherlands (NIVR), and the United Kingdom (SERC) as well as the USA.

While commenting on British-Dutch relations Doug Henderson stated in 1997 that:

We like fair play and straightforwardness (direct honesty). We have a deep interest and a sense of responsibility for what goes on in the wider world. We both share a commitment to global trade and have both traditionally promoted strong trans-Atlantic links. Furthermore, as former colonial powers, we both have important international interests.

His Dutch counterpart Frits Bolkestein responded by saying:

In the past the Netherlands was a staunch supporter of British entry into the European community. Apart from feeling sympathy for the British people, this was motivated by our common value and interests, such as long-standing and deeply-rooted democratic tradition, the Atlantic outlook, the free market orientation and three large multinational companies, such as Royal Dutch Shell, Unilever and Reckitt Benckiser, with a common Anglo-Dutch origin.

== Economic partnership ==
Royal Dutch Shell, Unilever and Reckitt Benckiser are three multinational companies of the joint Anglo-Dutch businesses. The Netherlands-British Chamber of Commerce was established to further economic co-operation between the two countries. In 2006 the Netherlands imported £16.6bn worth of goods from the United Kingdom, making it the UK's fifth biggest export market. Dutch-British trade is made simpler by good relations, transparent legal framework, sophisticated financial services system, good transport links and close geographical proximity. It is possible to reach either country by train, Eurostar, ferry or aeroplane.

On the local level, since 2022 there has been developed a special focus on mobility from the Dutch point of view towards the UK. In 2022 the embassy organised a Trade Mission and as a follow-up, the Trade Agencies of Amsterdam & Utrecht organised an inspiration mission to Manchester, Birmingham and London, together with the embassy. In 2024 Rotterdam and Flevoland joined them and they visited Bristol and London.

== Twinnings ==
- (Netherlands) Alkmaar, North Holland and (England) Bath, Somerset
- (Netherlands) Almelo, Overijssel and (England) Preston, Lancashire
- (Netherlands) Almere, Flevoland and (England) Milton Keynes (and associated town with the City of Lancaster)
- (Netherlands) Amstelveen, North Holland and (England) Woking, Surrey
- (Netherlands) Amsterdam, North Holland and (England) Manchester, Greater Manchester
- (Netherlands) Arnhem, Gelderland and (Scotland) Airdrie, North Lanarkshire
- (Netherlands) Arnhem, Gelderland and (England) Croydon, Greater London
- (Netherlands) Cuijk, North Brabant and (England) Maldon, Essex
- (Netherlands) Delft, South Holland and (England) Kingston upon Thames, Greater London
- (Netherlands) Dordrecht, South Holland and (England) Hastings, East Sussex
- (Netherlands) Gouda, South Holland and (England) Gloucester, Gloucestershire
- (Netherlands) Graft-De Rijp, North Holland and (England) Chalfont St. Giles, Buckinghamshire
- (Netherlands) Groningen, Groningen Province and (England) Newcastle-upon-Tyne, Tyne and Wear
- (Netherlands) Heemstede, North Holland and (England) Royal Leamington Spa, Warwickshire
- (Netherlands) Haaren, North Brabant and (England) Desborough, Northamptonshire
- (Netherlands) Hellevoetsluis, South Holland and (England) Torbay, Devon
- (Netherlands) Leiden, South Holland and (England) Oxford, Oxfordshire
- (Netherlands) Meerssen, Limburg and (England) Sherborne, Dorset
- (Netherlands) Rotterdam, South Holland and (England) Hull, East Riding of Yorkshire
- (Netherlands) Stampersgat, North Brabant and (England) Cheltenham, Gloucestershire
- (Netherlands) Zutphen, Gelderland and (England) Shrewsbury, Shropshire

== Armed forces ==
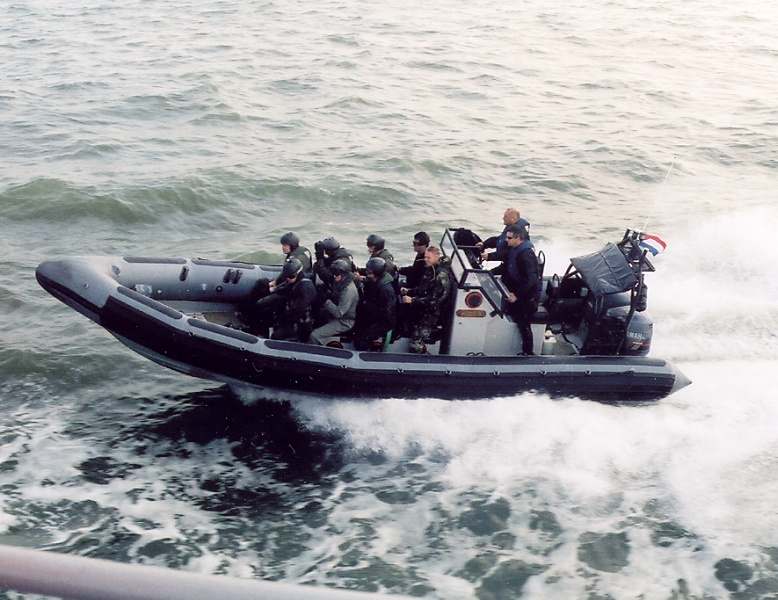
Dutch Marines in a British made Rigid-hulled inflatable boat

The Royal Marines and Netherlands Marine Corps are allied through a 'Bond of friendship'.

Since 1973, units of the Netherlands Marine Corps have formed part of the British 3 Commando Brigade during exercises and real conflict situations. Together, these form the UK/NL Landing Force. Either the First or the Second Marine Combat Group can be assigned as the Dutch contribution to this force.

The co-operation between the Korps Mariniers and the Royal Marines has led to extensive integration in the areas of operations, logistics and materials. Within NATO this is seen as a prime example of what can be achieved in military integration.

In combined NLMC and Royal Marines actions by the British and Dutch navies during the War of the Spanish Succession (1702–1713), amphibious operations were carried out, the most notable being the capture of Gibraltar in 1704. During this action, a successful attack was carried out against the fortress of Gibraltar by an 1800-strong brigade of Dutch and British Marines under the command of Prince George of Hesse-Darmstadt. Both corps share this battle honour.

The nickname of the Dutch Marines among their British Royal Marine counterparts is "Cloggies", a reference to the historic wearing of clogs by some Dutch people. Royal Navy Submarine Service officers taking the Submarine Command Course use a Dutch submarine simulator for part of the course.

On 7 July 2026, on the sidelines of the NATO summit in Ankara, UK Prime Minister Keir Starmer and Dutch Prime Minister Rob Jetten signed a £2.4 billion (US$3.2 billion) maritime partnership agreement to strengthen bilateral naval cooperation and support the joint procurement of new amphibious transport ships. The deal equips British and Dutch forces with eight advanced amphibious transport ships (four for each nation) to strengthen allied.

== Resident diplomatic missions ==
- The Netherlands maintains an embassy in London.
- The United Kingdom is accredited to the Netherlands through its embassy in The Hague.
- The Netherlands has an embassy in London as well as a network of honorary consulates throughout the UK, Guernsey, Gibraltar and Bermuda.
- United Kingdom has an embassy and a consulate-general in The Hague and honorary consulates in Willemstad and Philipsburg, Sint Maarten.
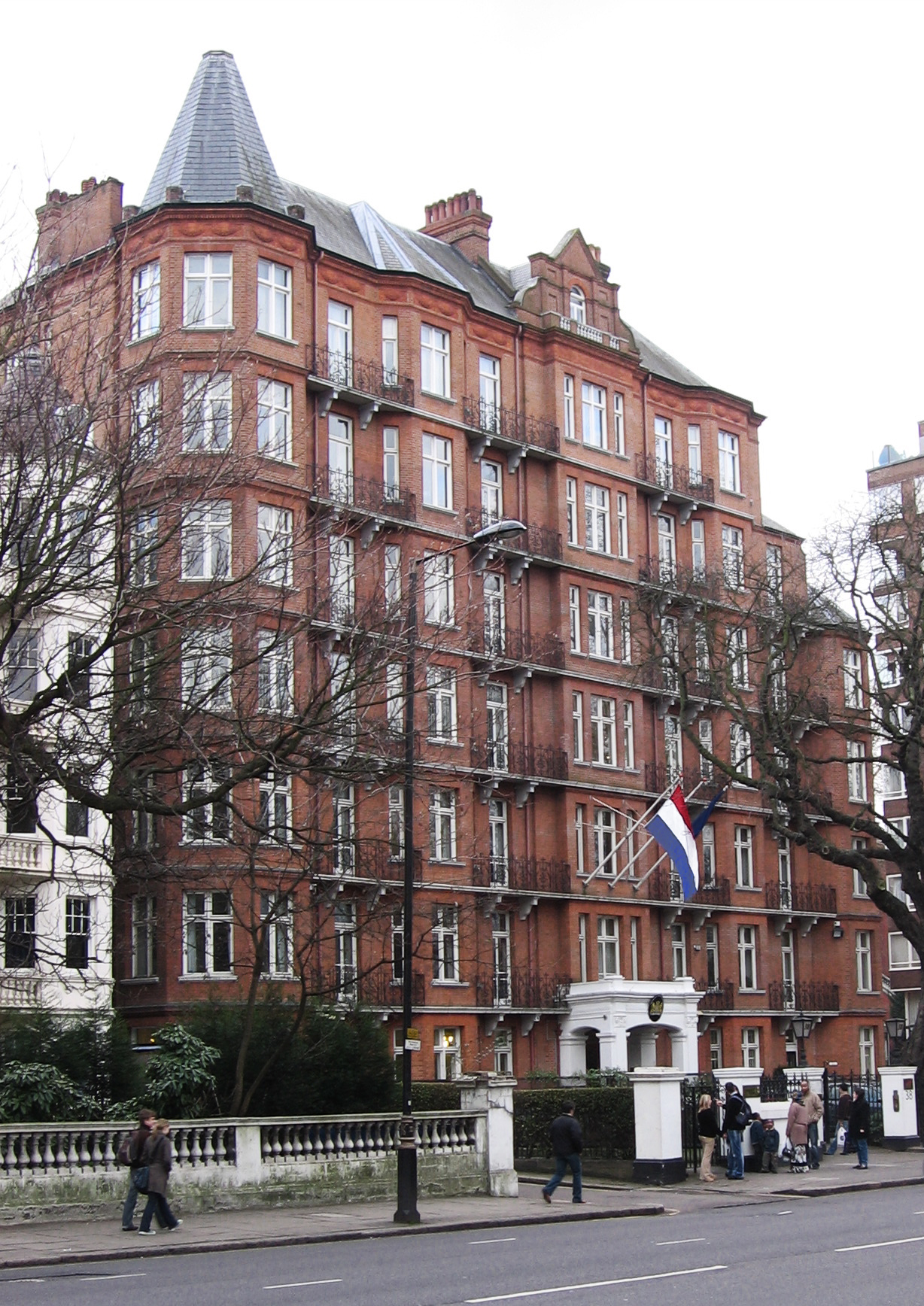
Embassy of the Netherlands in London

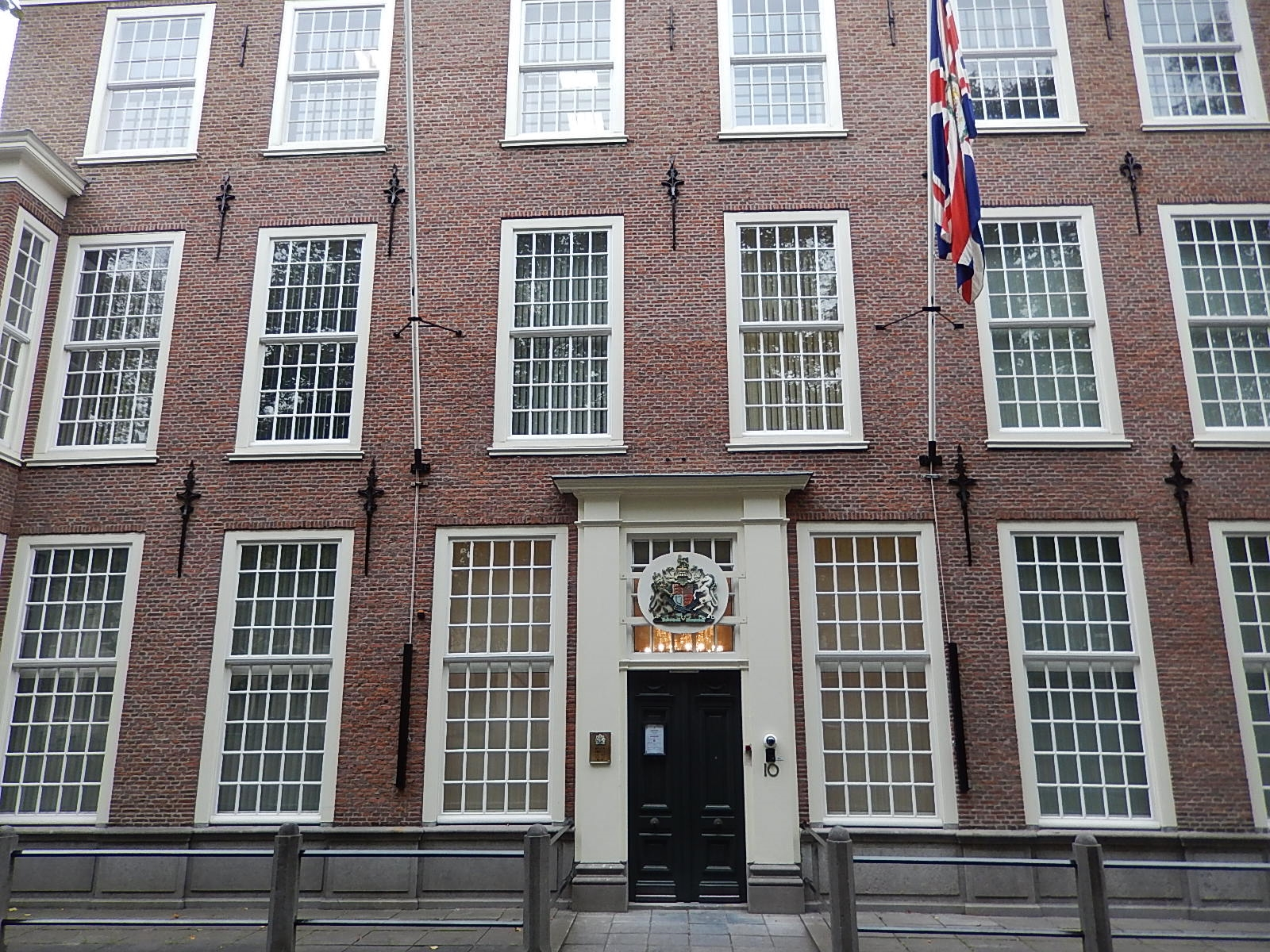
Embassy of the United Kingdom in The Hague

== See also ==
- Dutch people in the United Kingdom
- EU–UK Trade and Cooperation Agreement
- Foreign relations of the Netherlands
- Foreign relations of the United Kingdom
- List of diplomats from the United Kingdom to the Netherlands
- List of Dutch Britons
- United Kingdom–European Union relations
