= Netherlands–Turkey relations =

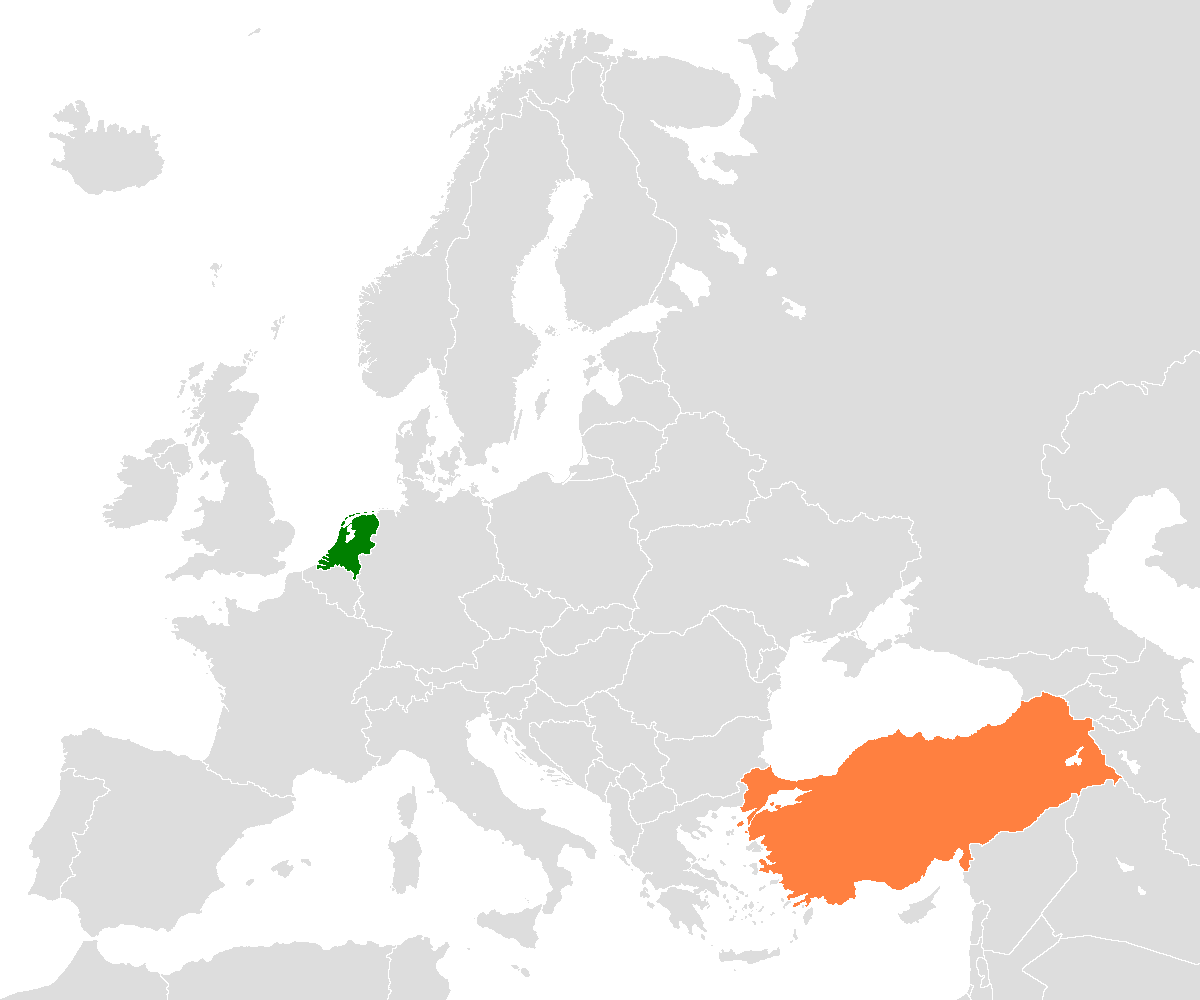
- Netherlands: Turkey

Diplomatic mission
- Embassy of the Netherlands, Ankara: Embassy of Turkey, The Hague

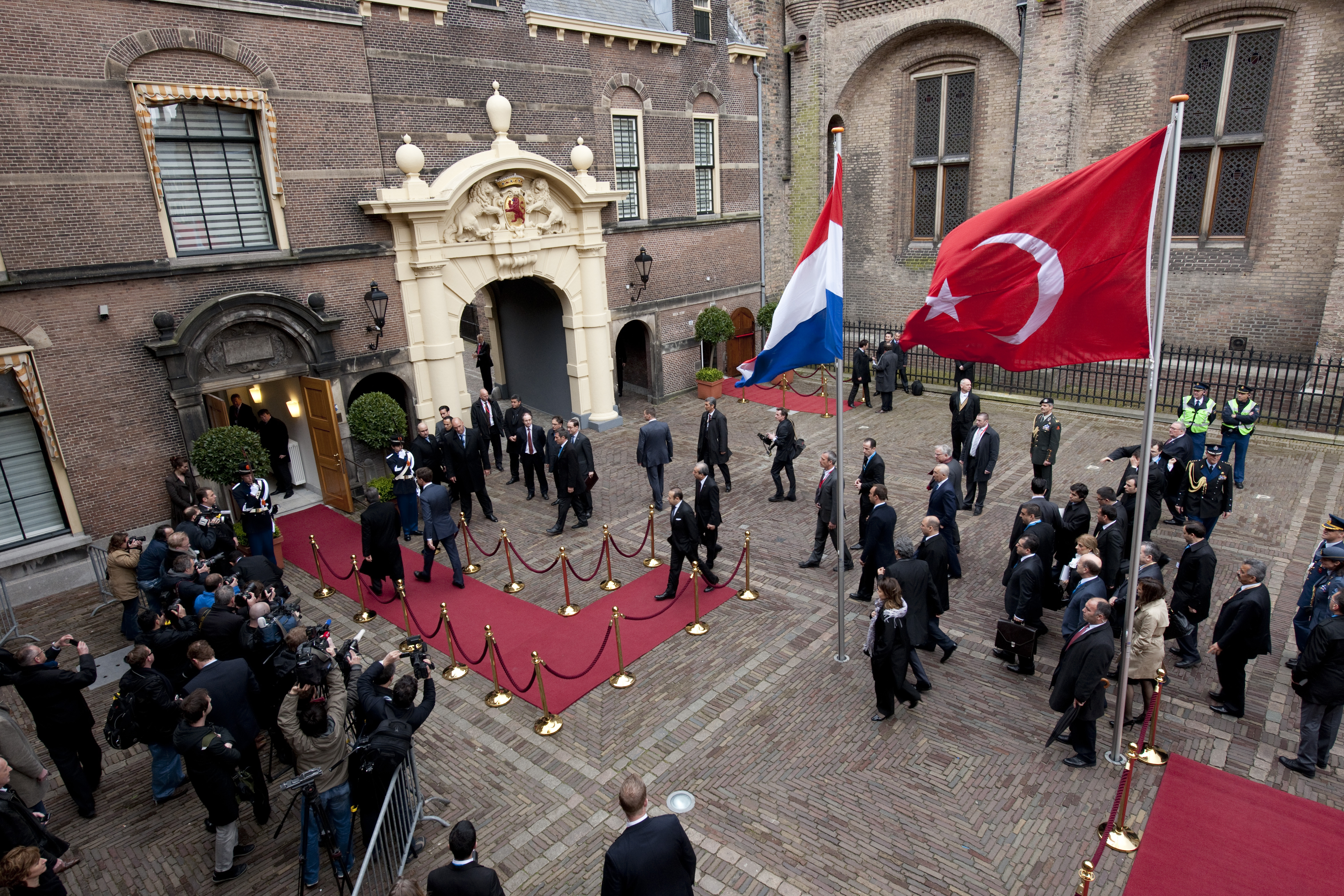
Dutch Prime Minister Mark Rutte receives Turkish President Abdullah Gül at the Binnenhof

Netherlands–Turkey relations are the bilateral relations between the Netherlands and Turkey. The diplomatic relations widely encompass and span four centuries, beginning in 1612. The first Turkish representative in the Netherlands started activities in 1859.

Before the Dutch had their own consuls in the Levant, they traded under the French Capitulations of 1569 until they sent Cornelius Haga as a consul to Istanbul in 1611. The States-General was responsible for appointing the consul, but the Levant merchants in these cases were closely consulted. The poor payment system for the consuls disrupted the potential successes of the relationship between consul and merchant community. The merchants requested changing to the Venetian fixed salary payment, but the States-General went against their wishes and tried to find other means of income. This posed problems for the Dutch consuls, and there are many reports of cases where consuls exerted their authority over the nations members who did not want to pay consulate and embassy dues. Despite internal struggle within the Dutch nation, it had a good relationship with the Ottomans and in 1804 Sultan Selim III (1789–1807) appointed the first resident representative to Amsterdam.

Turkeye is a village of Sluis, a municipality located in the west of Zeelandic Flanders, in the south-western part of the Netherlands. In 1604, Prince Maurits changed the name of the village in Turkeye to thank the Turkish sailors for their support to the Dutch during the battle with the Spaniards in the Dutch War of Independence.

The history of Turkey and the Netherlands stretches back to the 17th century, when the first representative of the States-General was sent to the Sublime Porte. Relations between the two have continued ever since, further cemented by Turkish guest workers in the '60s and '70s, and today by strong economic ties. There was a diplomatic crisis between the two countries in 2017. After a year of diplomatic crisis, in 2018, the two countries reached an agreement on all issues to normalize their diplomatic relations. Both countries are members of the Council of Europe and NATO.

== Political relations ==
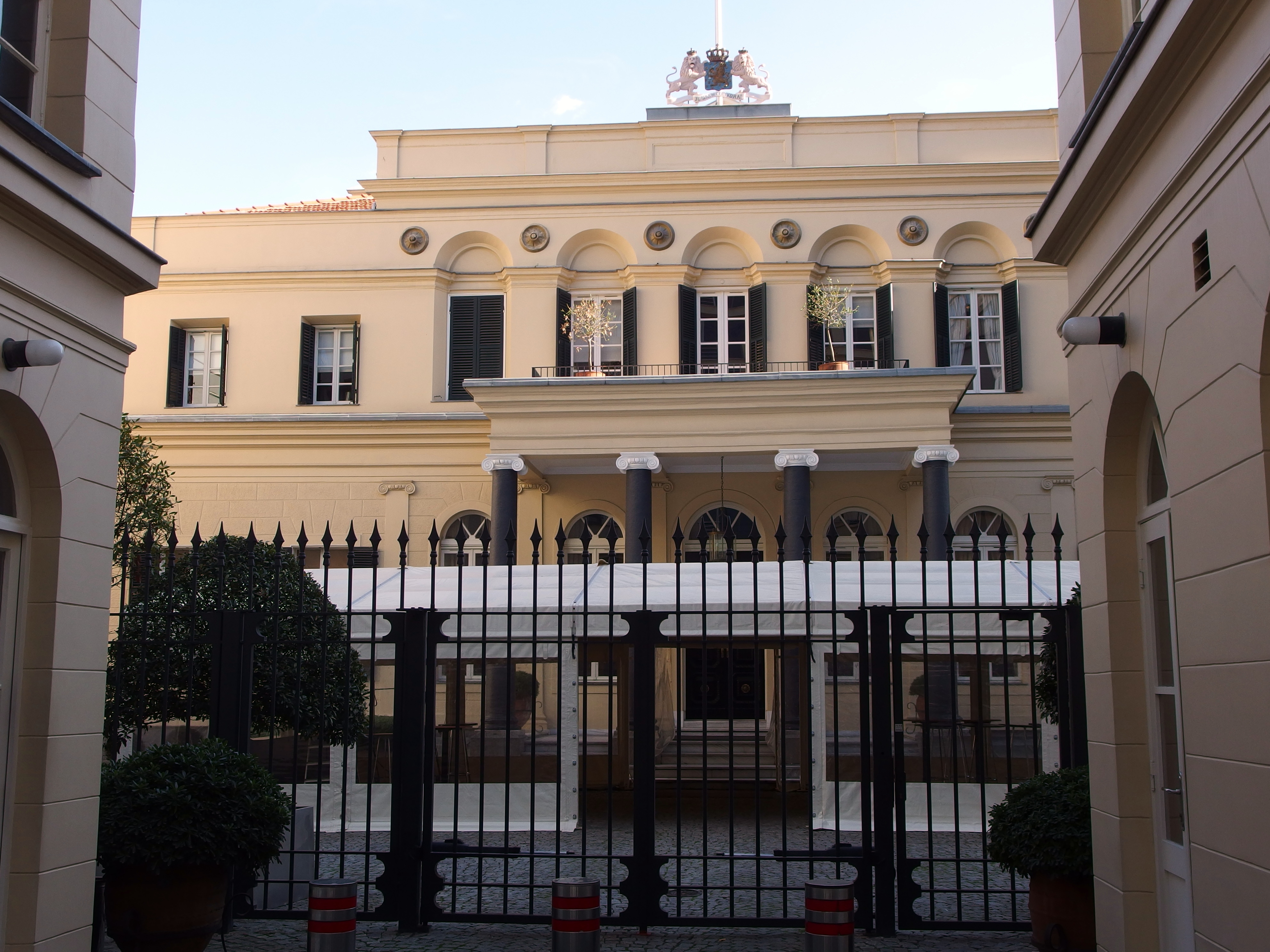
Consulate-General of Netherlands in Istanbul

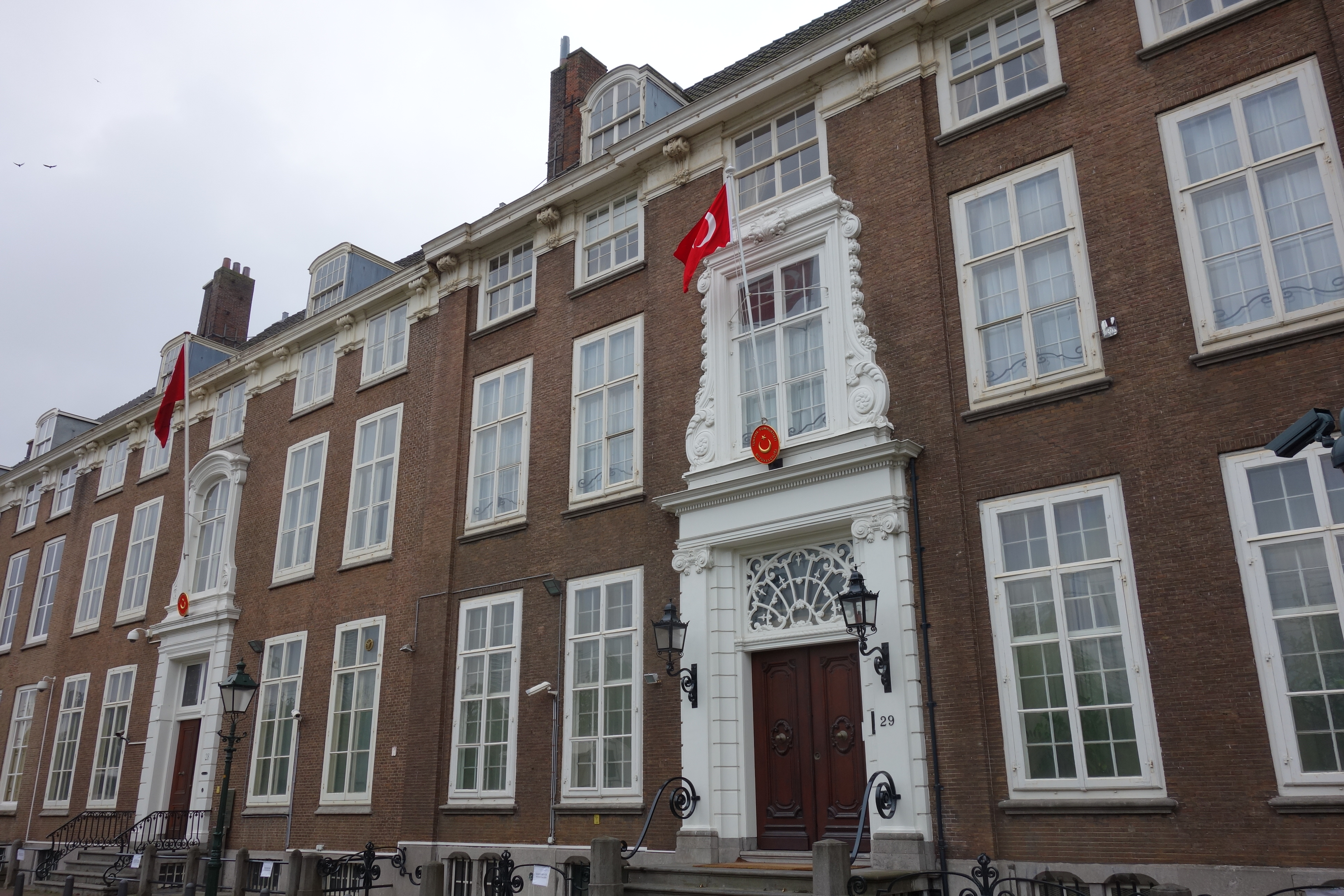
Embassy of Turkey in The Hague

The Netherlands and Turkey are both members of the Council of Europe, the North Atlantic Treaty Organization (NATO), the Organisation for Economic Co-operation and Development (OECD), the Organization for Security and Co-operation in Europe (OSCE), the World Trade Organization (WTO) and the Union for the Mediterranean.

=== Patriot missile support ===
In January 2013, The Netherlands sent two Patriot missile batteries along with troops to help Turkey defend against the missile threat from Syria. This was the third time Dutch Patriot missiles have been deployed in Turkey, after 1991 and 2003, in which they helped against possibile attacks from Iraq.

=== Yunus Affair ===
During a state visit to the Netherlands In March 2013, Prime Minister Erdoğan criticized the placement of the Turkish-Dutch foster child Yunus with lesbian foster parents. Deputy Prime Minister of the Netherlands Lodewijk Asscher considered the involvement of Turkey "totally inappropriate" and called it "presumptuous" when a foreign power expresses an opinion on the policy of Dutch foster care. Erdoğan proposed that the Turkish Ministry of Family Affairs and the Dutch Ministry of Security and Justice consult each other about the care of children of Turkish origin, but Prime Minister Mark Rutte rejected this proposal. Rutte said that placement of a child in a foster family always involves trying to match the child's background to that of the foster family. Failing that, the interest of the child comes first, and no distinction is made on the basis of religion or sexual orientation. Erdoğan intended to turn to the European Court of Human Rights to enforce Yunus to be reunited with his biological parents.

=== 2017 referendum campaign dispute ===
In the wake of the Turkish constitutional referendum, events featuring Turkish Ministers were scheduled to be held in the Netherlands in March 2017 in order to promote the proposed amendments to the Constitution of Turkey. The Dutch Government under Mark Rutte prohibited Turkish Ministers from entering the Netherlands for rallies, stating "We are of the opinion that Dutch public spaces are not the place for political campaigns of other countries". Turkish President Recep Tayyip Erdoğan sharply condemned the decision, calling the Netherlands a "Nazi remnant". Overseas election campaigning, even in diplomatic missions, is illegal under Turkish law; yet most political parties in Turkey including the ruling AKP have flouted the law. On 13 March 2017, Deputy Turkish Prime Minister Numan Kurtulmuş announced the suspension of high-level diplomatic relations between the Netherlands and Turkey and barred the Dutch ambassador from returning to Ankara.

The countries normalized the relations and appointed ambassadors in 2018.

=== Sanctions against Turkey ===
Netherlands criticized the 2019 Turkish offensive into north-eastern Syria. On 10 October 2019, a large majority of Dutch MPs backed the introduction of sanctions against Turkey. the Netherlands imposed an arms embargo on Turkey in 2019 due to Turkey's military operation in northeastern Syria. In July 2023, the Netherlands lifted its embargo on weapons exports to Turkey.

=== Osman Kavala dispute ===
In October 2021, in the wake of the appeal for the release of Turkish activist Osman Kavala signed by 10 western countries, Turkish president Recep Tayyip Erdoğan ordered his foreign minister to declare the Dutch ambassador persona non grata, alongside the other 9 ambassadors. Following a statement by the ambassadors, reiterating their compliance with Article 41 of the Vienna Convention on Diplomatic Relations regarding the diplomatic duty not to interfere in host states’ internal affairs, President Erdoğan decided to not expel the ambassadors.

=== Turkey's stance on enlargement of NATO ===
On 28 June 2022, the Netherlands welcomed Turkey's support for Finland and Sweden's NATO membership bids.

=== Turkey's stance on candidacy for NATO Secretary General ===
In April 2024, Turkey announced that they decided to support the candidacy of Dutch Prime Minister Mark Rutte, who announced that he would be a candidate for NATO Secretary General.

== Economic relations ==
Trade volume between Turkey and the Netherlands has increased remarkably over the years. In 2008, the Netherlands exported for almost 4 billion euros worth of goods to Turkey. This amount is doubled compared to 2000. Turkey exported in the same year 1.6 billion euros worth of goods to the Netherlands, with a share of 32 percent for garments.

Turkey is a very popular holiday destination for Dutch tourists. In 2009, more than 1.1 million Dutch tourists visited Turkey.

As of February 2011, 1894 Dutch companies have invested in Turkey, declared the Foreign Minister of Turkey Ahmet Davutoglu, making the Netherlands the country with the biggest investment in projects in Turkey.

== High level visits ==
Guest	Host	Place of visit	Date of visit	Reference
Prince Willem-Alexander of the Netherlands; Princess Máxima of the Netherlands	President Ahmet Necdet Sezer	Ankara, Cappadocia, Istanbul and Kayseri	25–28 May 2004	
Prime Minister Recep Tayyip Erdoğan	Prime Minister Jan Peter Balkenende	Huis ten Bosch, The Hague	16 June 2004	
Queen Beatrix of the Netherlands; Prince Willem-Alexander of the Netherlands; Princess Máxima of the Netherlands	President Ahmet Necdet Sezer	Ankara, Istanbul and Kayseri	27 February – 2 March 2007	
President Abdullah Gül	Queen Beatrix of the Netherlands; Prince Willem-Alexander of the Netherlands; Princess Máxima of the Netherlands	Amsterdam, The Hague	16–19 April 2012	
Prime Minister Recep Tayyip Erdoğan	Prime Minister Mark Rutte	Huis ten Bosch, The Hague	21 March 2013	
Foreign Minister Stef Blok	Foreign Minister Mevlüt Çavuşoğlu	Ankara and Istanbul	3–4 October 2018	
Foreign Minister Mevlüt Çavuşoğlu	Foreign Minister Stef Blok	The Hague and Amsterdam	10–11 April 2019	
Foreign Minister Sigrid Kaag	Foreign Minister Mevlüt Çavuşoğlu	Ankara	2 September 2021	
Prime Minister Mark Rutte	President Recep Tayyip Erdoğan	Ankara	22 March 2022	

== Resident diplomatic missions ==
- the Netherlands has an embassy in Ankara and a consulate-general in Istanbul.
- Turkey has an embassy in The Hague and consulates-general in Amsterdam, Deventer and Rotterdam.

== See also ==
- Wittenburg Conferences
- Foreign relations of the Netherlands
- Foreign relations of Turkey
- 2017 Dutch–Turkish diplomatic incident
- EU–Turkey relations
- Dutch people in Turkey
- Turks in the Netherlands
- Turks in Europe
- List of ambassadors of the Netherlands to Turkey
- List of ambassadors of Turkey to the Netherlands
- List of Dutch people of Turkish descent
- Cornelius Haga
- Liever Turks dan Paaps
- Palais de Hollande, Istanbul, former Dutch embassy
- The Union Church of Istanbul, located in the former embassy
