= Eight Articles of London =

1814 convention of the Great Powers

The Eight Articles of London, also known as the London Protocol of 21 June 1814, were a secret convention between the Great Powers: the United Kingdom, the Kingdom of Prussia, the Austrian Empire, and the Russian Empire (the four leading nations of the Sixth Coalition against France) to award the territory of current Belgium and The Netherlands to William I of the Netherlands, then "Sovereign Prince" of the United Netherlands. He accepted this award on 21 July 1814.

== Background ==
In early 1814 Napoleon I of France's empire was reeling under the onslaught of the Allies. The Netherlands, annexed to the Empire by the Rambouillet Decree of 9 July 1810, had already been evacuated by the French occupation troops. In that country power had been assumed by the eldest son of the late last Stadtholder of the former Dutch Republic on 6 December 1813, under the new title "Sovereign Prince." In the former Austrian Netherlands, conquered by France in 1794 and annexed in 1795, the Allies made quick progress also. This presented the problem of what to do with this country. The thirty most prominent families of Brussels expressed the wish to restore the old Governorate-general of the Austrians, and this was provisionally instituted by the Allies in February 1814 as their military government. However, Austria itself expressed little interest in resuming its rule. Therefore, the Allies in the secret annexes to the Treaty of Chaumont provisionally apportioned the country to the new Dutch state. This was further formalized in the Treaty of Paris of 30 May 1814, in which Belgium on the left bank of the river Meuse was apportioned to the (future) Netherlands (whereas the fate of the right bank area was to be determined later). How this was to be structured was, however, still to be decided, while certain expectations had been raised by the representatives of the Belgian people at Chaumont in February, that also needed to be honored in some way. These "loose ends" were taken care of in the protocol that came to be known as "The Eight Articles of London."

== The Protocol ==
The gist of the protocol was determined by the Sovereign Prince himself in a letter of 16 May 1814 to his minister of Foreign Affairs, baron Van Nagell. Van Nagell put this text in the form of a diplomatic note that the British ambassador in The Hague, Lord Clancarty, conveyed to the British Foreign Minister Robert Stewart, Viscount Castlereagh on 25 May. Castlereagh and William I were both in Paris for the signing of the treaty at the time. William sent a final draft of the Convention, as edited by Clancarty's Dutch colleague Anton Reinhard Falck, to the ministers of the other three Great Powers, Metternich, Nesselrode, and Hardenberg on 30 May. The treaty was signed by the representatives of the four Great Powers on 21 June 1814 in London with only a reversal in the order of the articles 7 and 8.

The text of the Articles follows:

Article 1 The union shall be intimate and complete, so that the two countries shall form only a single state to be governed by the Fundamental Law already established in Holland, which by mutual consent shall be modified according to the circumstances.

Article 2 There shall be no change in those articles of the Fundamental Law, which assure to all religious cults equal protection and privileges, and guarantee the admissibility of all citizens, whatever be their religious creed, to public offices and dignities.

Article 3 The Belgian provinces shall be in a fitting manner represented in the States General, whose sittings, in time of peace, shall be held by turns in a Dutch and a Belgian town.

Article 4 All the inhabitants of the Netherlands thus having equal constitutional rights, they shall have equal claim to all commercial and other rights of which their circumstances allow, without any hindrance or obstruction being imposed on any to the profit of others.

Article 5 Immediately after the union the provinces and towns of Belgium shall be admitted to the commerce and navigation of the Colonies of Holland upon the same footing as the Dutch provinces and towns.

Article 6 The debts contracted on the one side by the Dutch, and on the other side by the Belgian provinces shall be charged to the public chest of the Netherlands.

Article 7 The expenses requisite for the building and maintenance of the frontier fortresses of the new State shall be borne by the public chest as concerning the security and independence of all the provinces of the whole nation.

Article 8 The cost of the making and upkeep of the dykes shall be at the charges of the districts more directly interested, except in the case of an extraordinary disaster.

According to a protocol signed at the same time, the Powers based their decision to dispose of Belgium on the right of conquest. They expressed their desire to bring about the most perfect "amalgamation" of the two countries; they invited the Sovereign Prince to accept the Treaty, and an appointment as Governor-General for Belgium, and take steps in a liberal spirit to bring about the desired amalgamation. William accepted this charge on 21 July 1814

== Aftermath ==
William appointed a lieutenant-governor-general of the Belgian provinces on 1 August 1814. He subsequently tried to get the assent of the (carefully selected) representatives of the Belgian people to the Dutch constitution, but encountered opposition from those who were suspicious of designs to undermine the position of the Catholic Church in those provinces. While this process of negotiation dragged on, Napoleon escaped from his exile on the island of Elba, which started the Hundred Days. This period of turmoil prompted William to proclaim himself King of the Kingdom of the Netherlands on 16 March 1815. While the danger of a Napoleonic restoration still existed, days before the Battle of Waterloo, which took place on the territory of the new state, the formation of that state was homologated, that is, certified, by the Final Act of the Congress of Vienna on 9 June 1815. After Napoleon's defeat on 18 June the process of approving the constitution by the Belgians was finally forced by the expedient of counting abstentions, and the no-votes that were cast because of religious concerns, in a plebiscite on 18 August, as "tacit approval." This allowed William to be inaugurated formally as King of the new kingdom on 21 September 1815.

== See also ==
- Netherlands – United Kingdom relations

== Sources ==
- Blom, J. C. H. (2006). History of the Low Countries. Berghahn Books. p. 306ff. ISBN 9781845452728.
- (in Dutch)Colenbrander, H.T. (1909) Ontstaan der Grondwet, deel 2, 1815, Martinus Nijhoff
- Edward, J.E., Acton, D.A., Ward, A.W., Prothero, G.W., and Benians, E.A. (1907) The Cambridge Modern History. Vol. X The Restoration, New York, The MacMillan Company
