= Dutch people in the United Kingdom =

Total population
- Dutch-born residents in the United Kingdom: 73,283 (2021/22 Census) (Note: Does not include ethnic Dutch people born in the United Kingdom or those with Dutch ancestry); England: 65,481 (2021); Scotland: 5,193 (2022); Wales: 1,896 (2021); Northern Ireland: 713 (2021); Previous estimates: 40,438 (2001 census); 63,713 (2011 census)

Regions with significant populations
- London, South East England and Scotland

Languages
- English, Dutch, West Frisian

Religion
- Mostly Protestantism, Roman Catholicism

Dutch people in the United Kingdom, also known as Anglo-Dutch people, include British people of Dutch ancestry and people born in the Netherlands who live in the United Kingdom. The 2001 UK Census recorded 40,438 Dutch-born people living in the UK. More recent estimates by the Office for National Statistics put the figure at 56,000 in 2013. The 2011 Census recorded 57,439 Dutch-born residents in England, 1,642 in Wales, 4,117 in Scotland and 515 in Northern Ireland.

== See also ==
- Dutch diaspora
- List of British people of Dutch descent
- Netherlands–United Kingdom relations
