= Embassy of Turkey, The Hague =

Turkish embassy in the Netherlands

Coordinates: 52.0849°N 4.3158°E

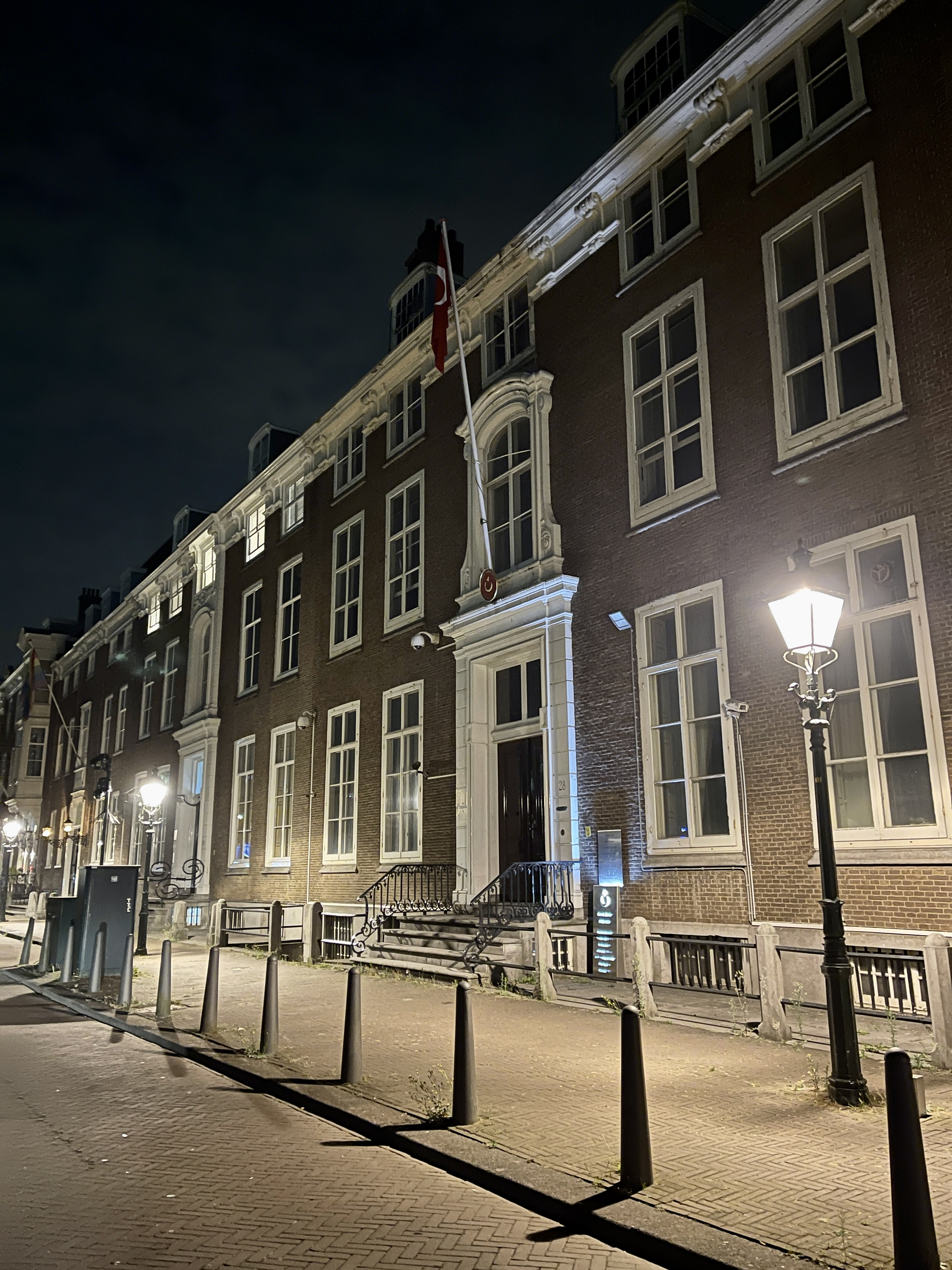
Embassy in The Hague

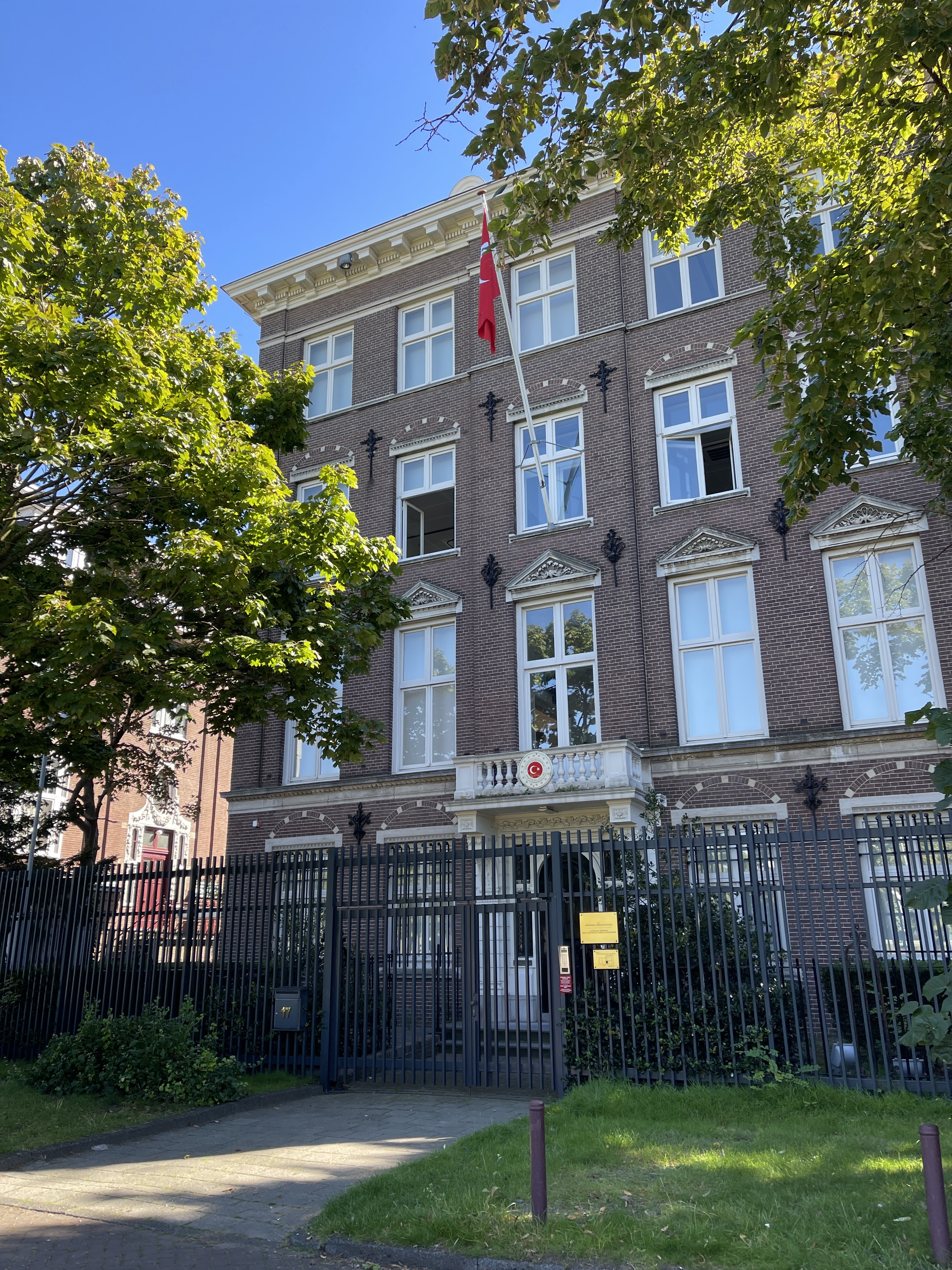
Consulate–General in Amsterdam; an extension of the embassy

The Embassy of Turkey in The Hague is the chief diplomatic mission of the Republic of Turkey in the Kingdom of the Netherlands.

== Background ==
The current Turkish Ambassador to the Netherlands is Selçuk Ünal.

Outside The Hague, there is also Turkish Consulate Generals in Amsterdam, Rotterdam, and Deventer where the senior officer is known as the Consul-General. As the Turks are the largest minority in the Netherlands, the four Turkish diplomatic missions in the country serve for various causes.

The seat of the ambassador was first held by Yahya Karaca Paşa on 28 December 1859. Since then, diplomatic relations between the Netherlands and the Ottoman Empire was held through the embassy until when the Ottoman Empire collapsed in 1922 and made its way to its successor state, the Republic of Turkey.

On 12 October 1979, the son of the then incumbent Turkish ambassador Ahmet Benler was assassinated by gunmen on his way to school in Delft University.

== See also ==
- Netherlands–Turkey relations
- List of diplomatic missions in the Netherlands
- List of ambassadors of Turkey to the Netherlands
