= Embassy of the Netherlands, London =

Diplomatic mission of the Netherlands in the United Kingdom

Embassy of the Kingdom of the Netherlands in London
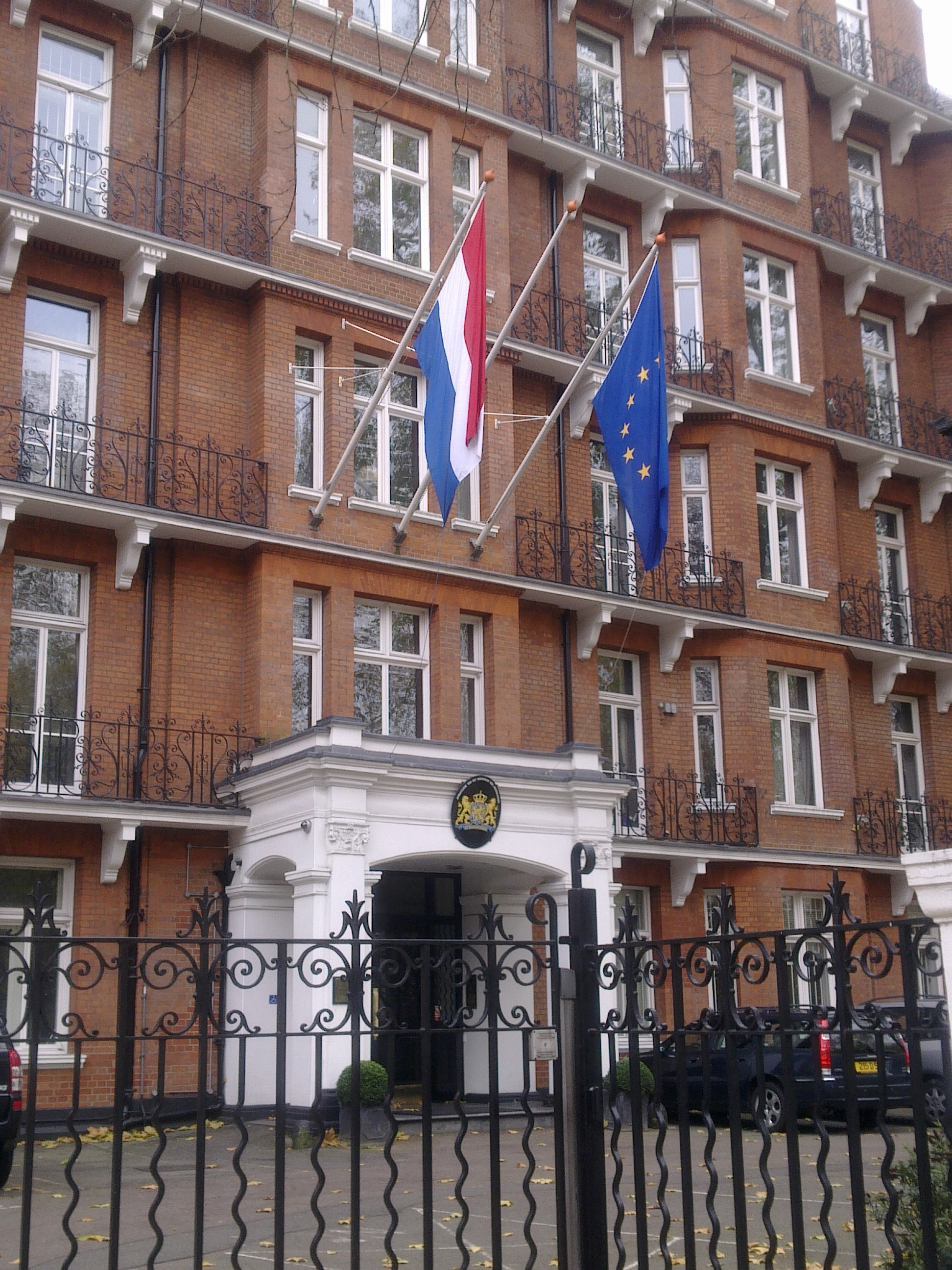
- Location: South Kensington, London
- Address: 38 Hyde Park Gate, London, SW7 5DP
- Coordinates: 51°30′3.2″N 0°10′56.2″W
- Ambassador: Paul Huijts

The Embassy of the Kingdom of the Netherlands in London is the diplomatic mission of the Netherlands in the United Kingdom.

The embassy is currently situated in a red brick mansion block at Hyde Park Gate, which it has occupied since 1953.

== Gallery ==
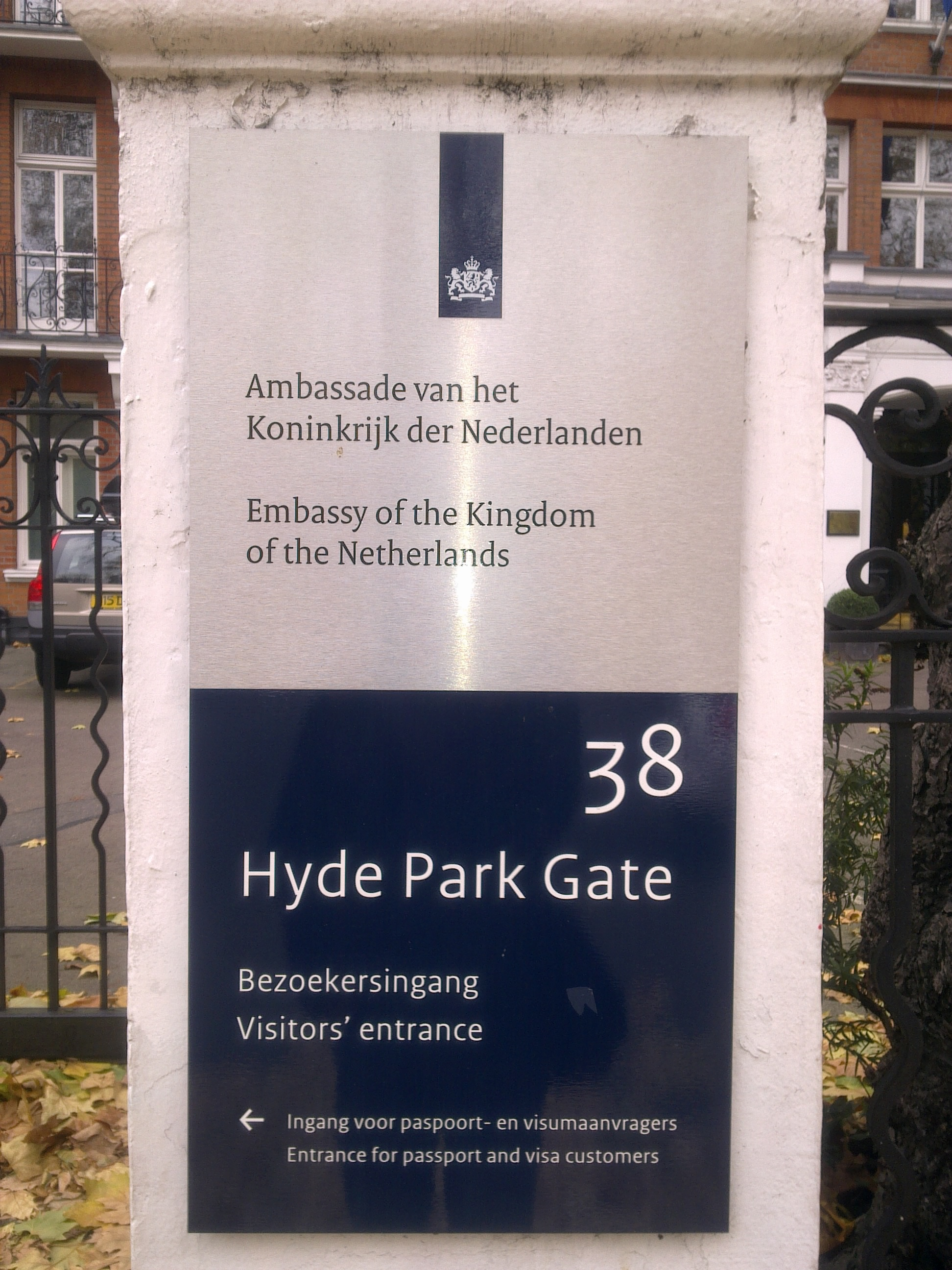
Plaque outside the embassy in Dutch and English depicting the coat of arms of the Netherlands

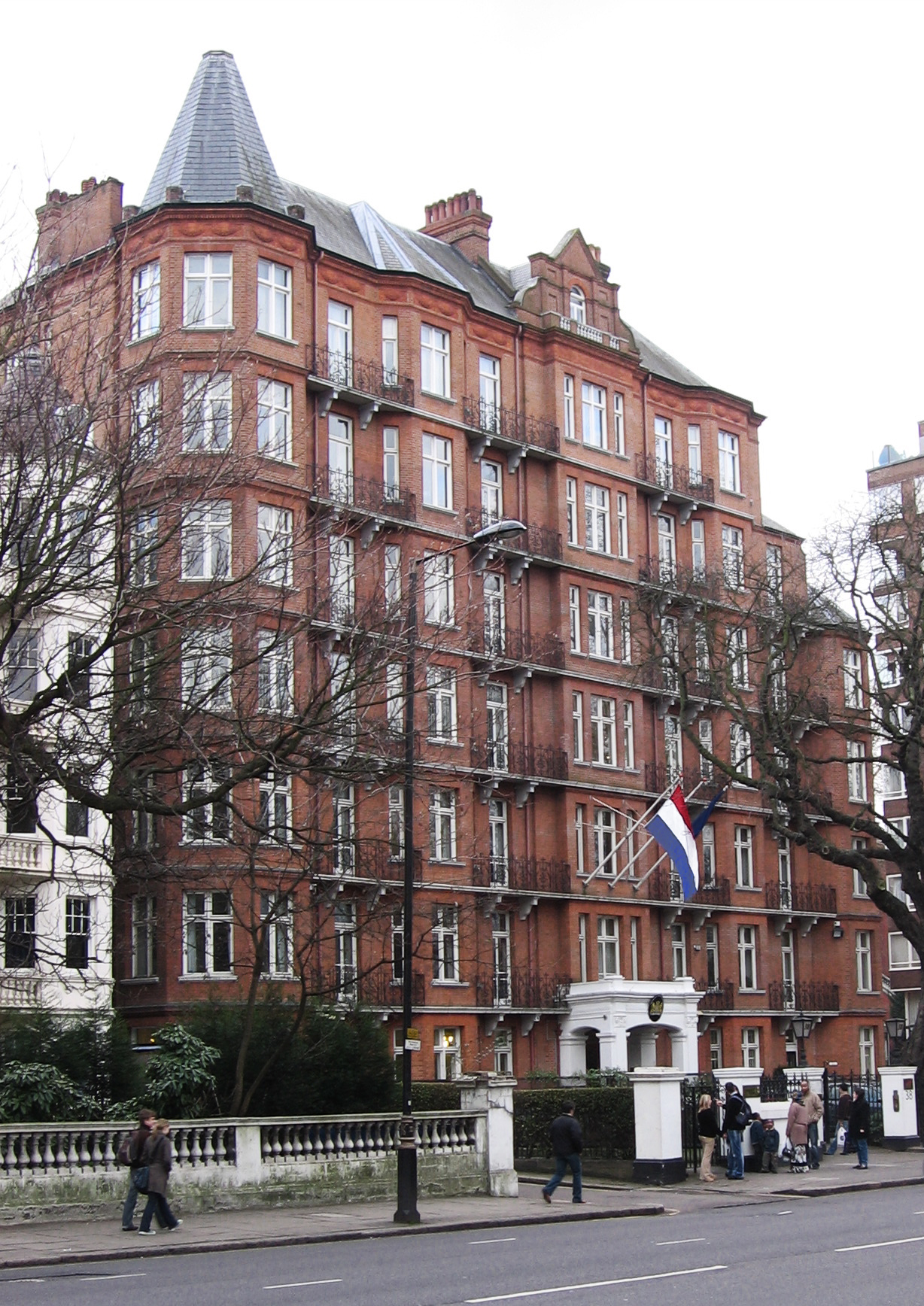
The embassy

== See also ==
- Netherlands–United Kingdom relations
- Embassy of the United Kingdom, The Hague
