= Wittenburg Conferences =

Dutch-Turkish meetings

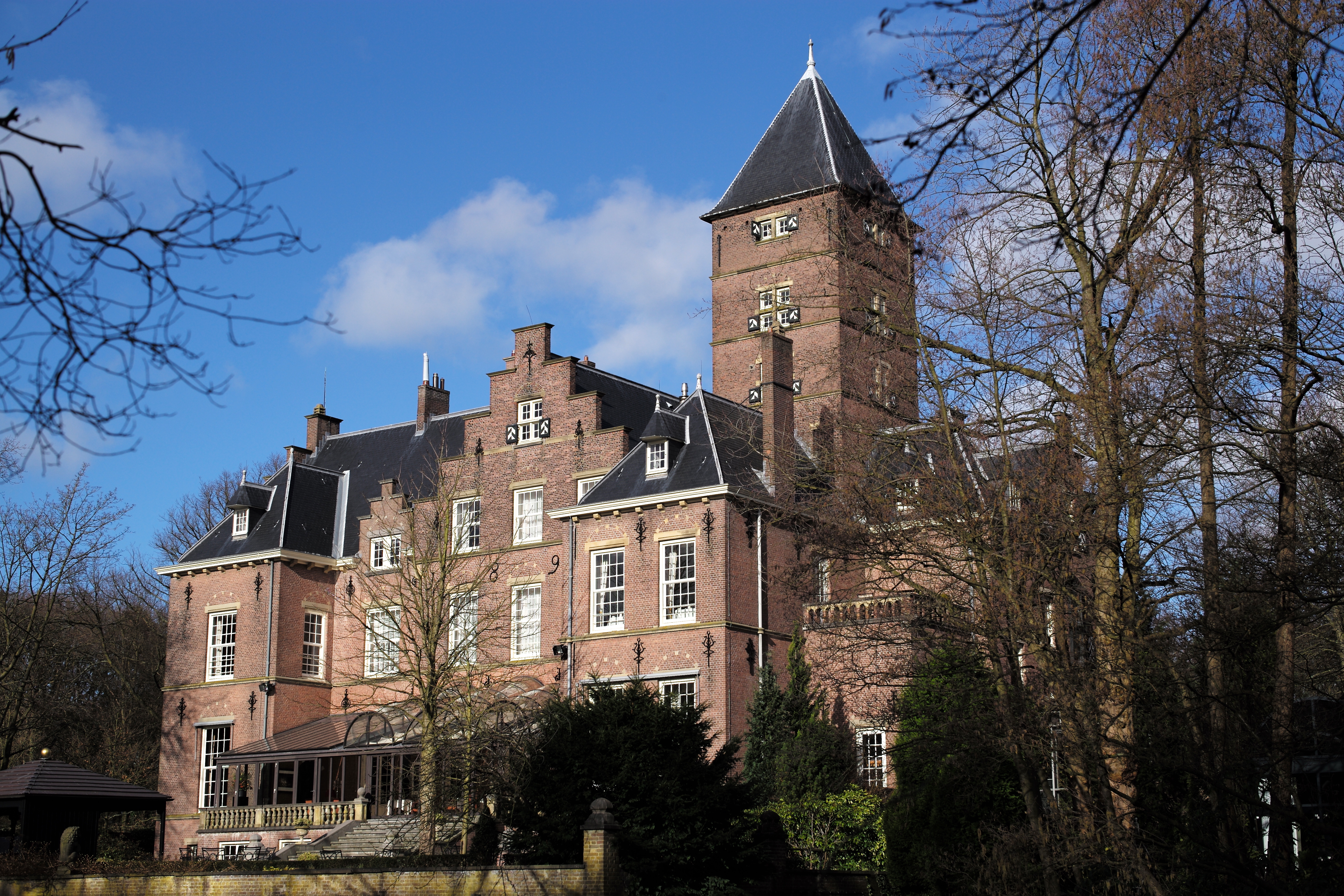
The Wittenburg Castle, the location of the first meeting

The Wittenburg Conferences are Dutch-Turkish meetings with the aim of strengthening bilateral relations and cooperation between Turkey and the Netherlands through meetings of specific working groups and the exchange of views on topics of common interest. The meetings are at ministerial and official level and are held alternately in the Netherlands and Turkey. Social, economic, cultural and security issues are discussed in these meetings.

== History ==
The first Wittenburg conference took place in 2008 in the Wittenburg Castle in Wassenaar. The meetings take place in accordance with the Memorandum of understanding (MoU), signed in March 2008, aimed at strengthening bilateral relations and cooperation between Turkey and the Netherlands. There was no meeting between 2014 and 2018. At the seventh edition in Amsterdam in 2019, when the ties had been restored again, the intention was to organize it annually. This was however not possible due to the COVID-19 pandemic. The June 2022 meeting in Ankara re-established ministerial and official ties. Topics such as the Turkish-Dutch community, counterterrorism, the EU-Turkey relationship, climate and energy were discussed.

== Possible expansion ==
The Adviesraad Internationale Vraagstukken (AIV), the advisory body for the Dutch government and parliament in the field of foreign policy, advises in its report to expand the Wittenburg conference to include Germany in the short term and, if progress is made, to convert this into a more permanent tripartite consultation structure.

== See also ==
- Netherlands–Turkey relations
