= Rambouillet Decree =

French decree

The Rambouillet Decree was a decree made by Napoleon Bonaparte in retaliation to the American Nonintercourse Act. It stated that any American ship that entered a French port was subject to confiscation.
