= Anton Reinhard Falck =

Dutch diplomat and statesman (1777–1843)

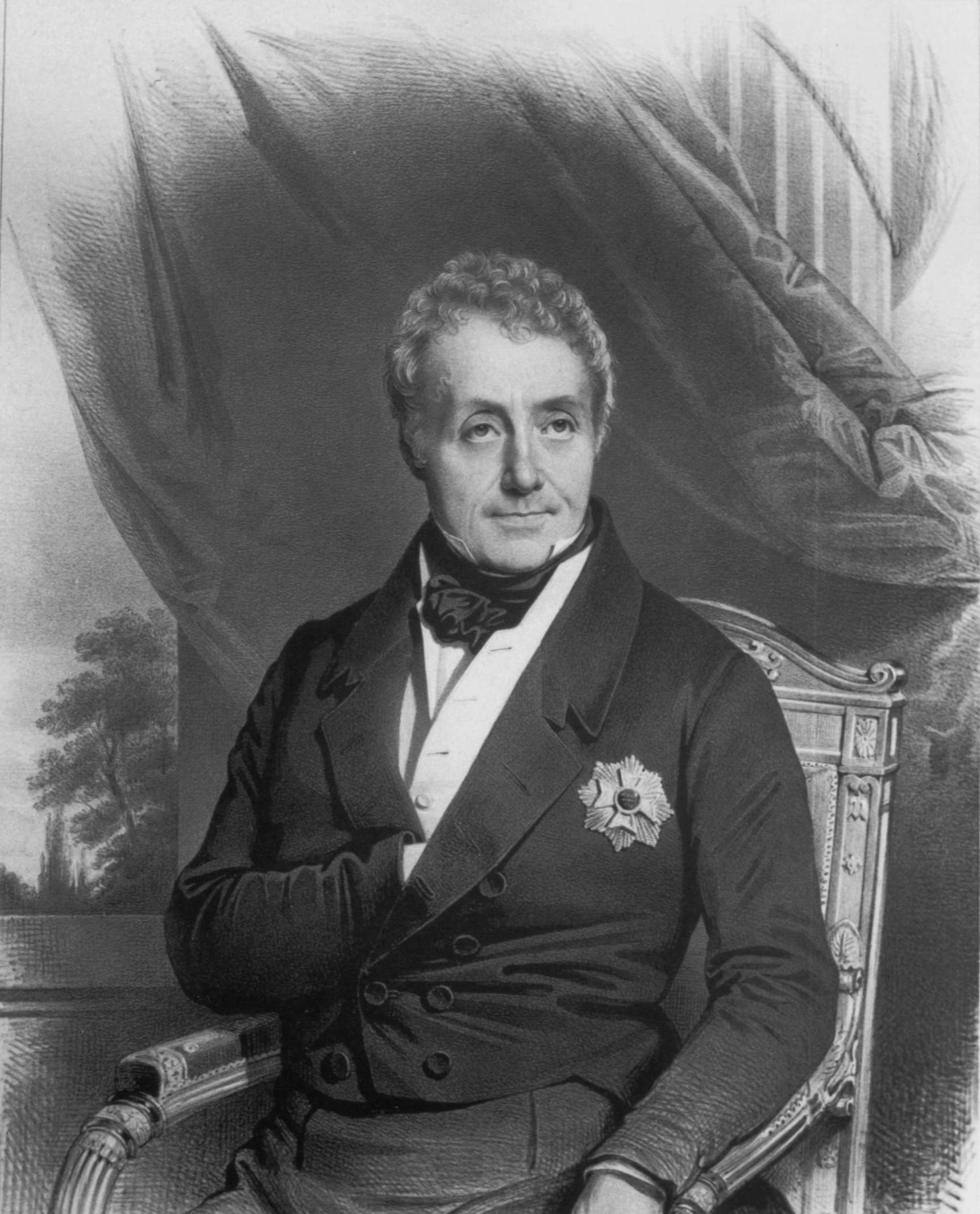
Anton Reinhard Falck

Anton Reinhard Falck (19 March 1777 in Utrecht – 16 March 1843 in Brussels) was a Dutch statesman.

He studied at the University of Leiden, and entered the Dutch diplomat service, being appointed to the legation at Madrid, Spain. Under King Louis Napoleon he was secretary-general for foreign affairs, but resigned from office due to the annexation of the Batavian Republic of France. He took a leading part in the revolt of 1813 against French domination, and was instrumental in the organization of the new kingdom of the Netherlands by drafting the Eight Articles of London which laid the foundation.

As minister of education under William I he reorganized the universities Ghent, Leuven and Liège, and the Royal Academy of Brussels. Side by side with his activities in education he directed the departments of trade and the colonies.

In the Netherlands Falck was called the king's 'good genius', but William I tired of his counsels and he was superseded by Van Maanen. He was an ambassador in London when the disturbances of 1830 convinced him of the necessity of the separation of Belgium from the Netherlands. He consequently resigned from his post and lived in close retirement until 1839, when he became the first Dutch minister (and ambassador) at the Belgian court. He died at Brussels on 16 March 1843.

Besides some historical works he left a correspondence of considerable political interest.
