= List of ambassadors of Turkey to the Netherlands =

The list of ambassadors of Turkey to the Netherlands provides a chronological record of individuals who have served as the diplomatic representatives of the Republic of Turkey to the Kingdom of the Netherlands. The diplomatic relations between Turkey and the Netherlands date back several decades and have evolved over time, reflecting the political, economic, and cultural ties between the two nations.

Turkey and the Netherlands established official diplomatic relations in 1612, marking the beginning of a longstanding partnership characterized by mutual respect and cooperation. The ambassadorial role plays a vital role in fostering strong bilateral relations, facilitating dialogue, and enhancing collaboration in various fields, including trade, investment, culture, and diplomacy.

== List of ambassadors ==
Ambassador	Term start	Term end	Ref.
Mehmet Esad Atuner	22 June 1924	19 July 1928	
Aali Türkeldi	20 July 1928	14 November 1929	
Esad Cemal Bey	14 December 1929	Unknown	
Nuri Batu	30 August 1931	5 August 1935	
Abdullahad Akşin	5 August 1935	3 May 1938	
Ahmet Cevad Üstün	12 May 1938	17 August 1939	
Yakup Kadri Karaosmanoğlu	1 October 1939	4 July 1940	
Aali Türkeldi	26 June 1946	4 April 1948	
Nedim Veysel İlkin	28 April 1948	17 September 1948	
Abdullah Zeki Polar	25 June 1949	16 April 1955	
Turgud Aytuğ	7 April 1955	14 March 1957	
Selahaddin Arbel	15 March 1957	29 April 1961	
Fuat Kepenek	27 June 1961	10 September 1964	
Reşad Erhan	24 October 1964	10 May 1966	
Vahit Halefoğlu	30 May 1966	28 November 1970	
Daniş Tunalıgil	30 November 1970	2 November 1973	
Oktay Cankardeş	22 November 1973	8 July 1978	
Özdemir Benler	16 July 1978	17 August 1982	
Filiz Dinçmen	24 September 1982	2 November 1984	
Ayhan Kamel	1 December 1984	18 December 1986	
İsmet Birsel	23 December 1986	15 June 1989	
Bilgin Unan	18 June 1989	1 August 1991	
Zeki Çelikkol	10 August 1991	29 February 1996	
Baki İlkin	1 March 1996	17 April 1998	
Bilgin Unan	29 April 1998	19 January 2000	
Aydan Karahan	26 January 2000	1 April 2003	
Tacan İldem	16 April 2003	29 December 2006	
Selahattin Alpar	1 January 2007	15 August 2009	
Uğur Doğan	24 August 2009	30 November 2013	
Sadık Arslan	14 December 2013	1 April 2017	
Şaban Dişli	31 October 2018	1 February 2023	
Selçuk Ünal	1 February 2023	2025	
Fatma Ceren Yazgan	2025	Present	

== List of Ottoman ambassadors ==
Ambassador	Term start	Term end	Ref.
Yahya Karaca Paşa	28 December 1859	Unknown	
Kostaki Muzurus Paşa	28 September 1861	Unknown	
Murat Efendi	26 June 1877	Unknown	
Yahya Karaca Paşa	26 September 1881	Unknown	
Yahya Karaca Paşa	1 January 1891	Unknown	
Alexandr Karatodori Efendi	4 August 1894	24 April 1895	
Abdülhak Hamit Bey (Tarhan)	24 April 1895	Unknown	
Misak Efendi	17 February 1898	Unknown	
Misak Efendi	3 June 1909	Unknown	
Nusret Sadullah Bey (Ayaşlı)	1 May 1915	1 November 1922	
Mehmet Esad Bey (Atuner)	1 November 1922	28 February 1923	

== See also ==
Embassy of Turkey in the Hague
