= List of diplomatic missions in the Netherlands =

This article contains a list of diplomatic missions in the Netherlands. There are currently 109 embassies in The Hague; many countries maintain consulates in other Dutch cities, notably Amsterdam and Rotterdam. Honorary consulates are not included in the list.

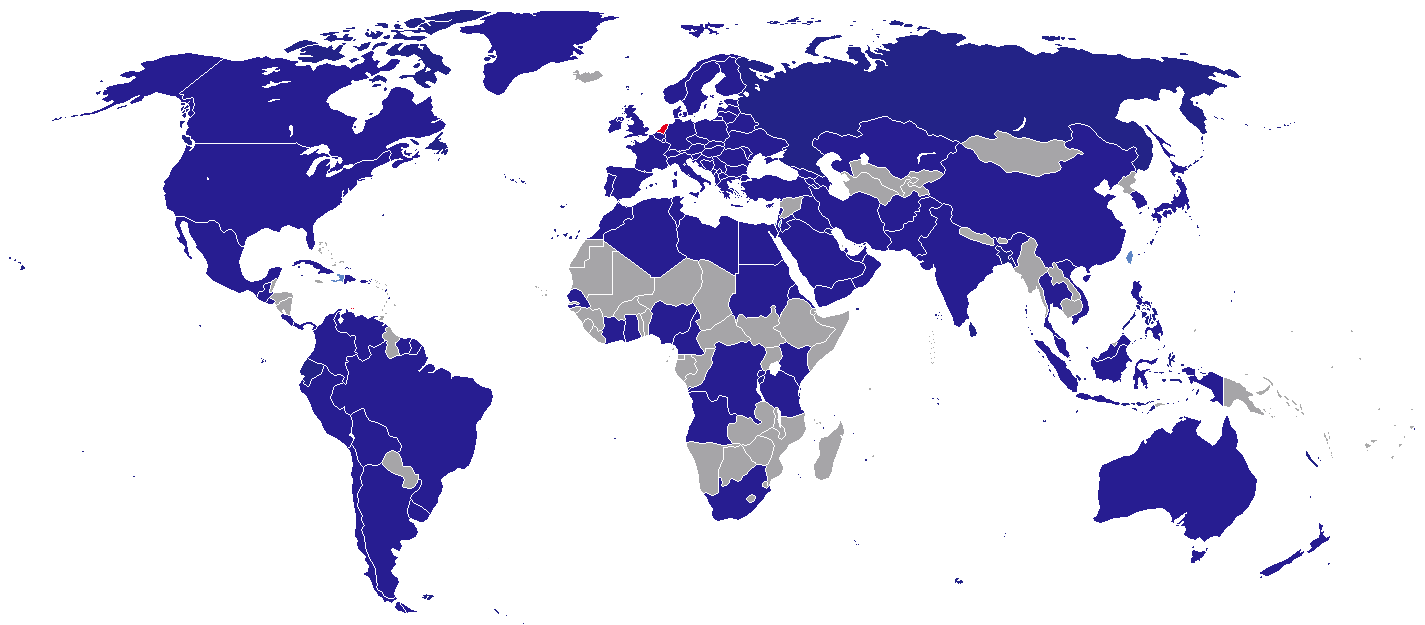
Map of diplomatic missions in the Netherlands

== Diplomatic missions in The Hague ==
Country	Mission type	Photo
Afghanistan	Embassy	
Albania	Embassy	
Algeria	Embassy	
Angola	Embassy	
Argentina	Embassy	
Armenia	Embassy	
Australia	Embassy	
Austria	Embassy	
Azerbaijan	Embassy	
Bangladesh	Embassy	
Belarus	Embassy	
Belgium	Embassy	
Bolivia	Embassy	
Bosnia and Herzegovina	Embassy	
Brazil	Embassy	
Bulgaria	Embassy	
Burundi	Embassy	
Cameroon	Embassy	
Canada	Embassy	
Chile	Embassy	
China	Embassy	
Colombia	Embassy	
Costa Rica	Embassy	
Croatia	Embassy	
Cuba	Embassy	
Cyprus	Embassy	
Czech Republic	Embassy	
Denmark	Embassy	
Democratic Republic of the Congo	Embassy	
Dominican Republic	Embassy	
Ecuador	Embassy	
Egypt	Embassy	
El Salvador	Embassy	
Eritrea	Embassy	
Estonia	Embassy	
Finland	Embassy	
France	Embassy	
Georgia	Embassy	
Germany	Embassy	
Ghana	Embassy	
Greece	Embassy	
Guatemala	Embassy	
Holy See	Apostolic Nunciature	
Hungary	Embassy	
India	Embassy	
Indonesia	Embassy	
Iran	Embassy	
Iraq	Embassy	
Ireland	Embassy	
Israel	Embassy	
Italy	Embassy	
Ivory Coast	Embassy	
Japan	Embassy	
Jordan	Embassy	
Kazakhstan	Embassy	
Kenya	Embassy	
Kosovo	Embassy	
Kuwait	Embassy	
Latvia	Embassy	
Lebanon	Embassy	
Libya	Embassy	
Lithuania	Embassy	
Luxembourg	Embassy	
Malaysia	Embassy	
Malta	Embassy	
Mexico	Embassy	
Moldova	Embassy	
Montenegro	Embassy	
Morocco	Embassy	
New Zealand	Embassy	
Nigeria	Embassy	
North Macedonia	Embassy	
Norway	Embassy	
Oman	Embassy	
Pakistan	Embassy	
Panama	Embassy	
Peru	Embassy	Embassy in The Hague
Philippines	Embassy	
Poland	Embassy	
Portugal	Embassy	
Qatar	Embassy	
Romania	Embassy	
Russia	Embassy	
Rwanda	Embassy	
Saudi Arabia	Embassy	
Senegal	Embassy	
Serbia	Embassy	
Slovakia	Embassy	
Slovenia	Embassy	
South Africa	Embassy	
Republic of Korea	Embassy	
Spain	Embassy	
Sri Lanka	Embassy	
Sudan	Embassy	
Suriname	Embassy	
Sweden	Embassy	
Switzerland	Embassy	
Tanzania	Embassy	
Thailand	Embassy	
Tunisia	Embassy	
Turkey	Embassy	
Ukraine	Embassy	
United Arab Emirates	Embassy	
United Kingdom	Embassy	
United States	Embassy	
Uruguay	Embassy	
Venezuela	Embassy	
Vietnam	Embassy	
Yemen	Embassy	

== Representatives Offices in The Hague ==
Country/territory	Mission type	Photo
Flanders (Belgium)	Representative Office	
Palestine	Mission	
Republic of China (Taiwan)	Representative Office	

== Consulates General / Consulates ==
=== Amsterdam ===
- Brazil
- Chile
- Colombia
- Dominican Republic
- France
- Germany
- Morocco
- Peru
- Spain
- Suriname
- Turkey
- United States

=== Deventer ===
- Turkey

=== Oranjestad, Aruba ===
- Colombia (Consulate)
- Haiti
- Venezuela

=== Philipsburg, Sint Maarten ===
- Dominican Republic

=== Rotterdam ===
- Angola
- Cape Verde
- Cuba
- Morocco
- Norway
- Panama
- Turkey

=== 's-Hertogenbosch ===
- Morocco

=== Utrecht ===
- Morocco

=== Willemstad, Curaçao ===
- China
- Colombia (Consulate)
- Dominican Republic
- Haiti
- Suriname
- United Kingdom (Consulate)
- United States
- Venezuela

== Accredited embassies ==
Resident in Brussels unless otherwise noted.

- Andorra
- Bahrain
- Barbados
- Belize
- Bhutan
- Botswana
- Brunei
- Burkina Faso
- Cambodia
- Chad
- Central African Republic
- Congo-Brazzaville
- Djibouti
- Dominica (London)
- Equatorial Guinea
- Eswatini
- Ethiopia
- Fiji
- Gabon
- Gambia
- Guinea
- Guinea-Bissau
- Guyana
- Haiti
- Honduras
- Iceland
- Jamaica
- Kyrgyzstan
- Laos
- Lesotho
- Liberia
- Madagascar
- Malawi
- Maldives
- Mali
- Mauritania
- Mauritius
- Mongolia
- Myanmar
- Namibia
- Nepal
- North Korea (Bern)
- Papua New Guinea
- Paraguay
- Samoa
- San Marino
- Seychelles
- Sierra Leone
- Singapore
- Solomon Islands
- South Sudan
- Togo
- Tonga (London)
- Trinidad and Tobago
- Uganda
- Zambia
- Zimbabwe

== Closed missions ==
Host city	Sending country	Mission level	Year closed	Ref.
The Hague	Ethiopia	Embassy (Note: Resident in Brussels, Belgium)	2021	
The Hague	Honduras	Embassy	2012	
Amsterdam	Denmark	Consulate-General	2017	
Amsterdam	Indonesia	Consulate-General	1976	
Amsterdam	Norway	Consulate-General	2010	
Amsterdam	Portugal	Consulate-General	2015	
Amsterdam	Sweden	Consulate-General	1985	
Utrecht	Suriname	Consulate-General	2010	
Rotterdam	Brazil	Consulate-General	2012	
Rotterdam	Sweden	Consulate (Note: Was a consulate-general until 1980, when it was downgraded to a consulate.)	1983	
Rotterdam	Switzerland	Consulate-General	1997	

== See also ==
- Foreign relations of the Netherlands
- Visa requirements for Dutch citizens
