= Agnites Vrolik =

Dutch politician

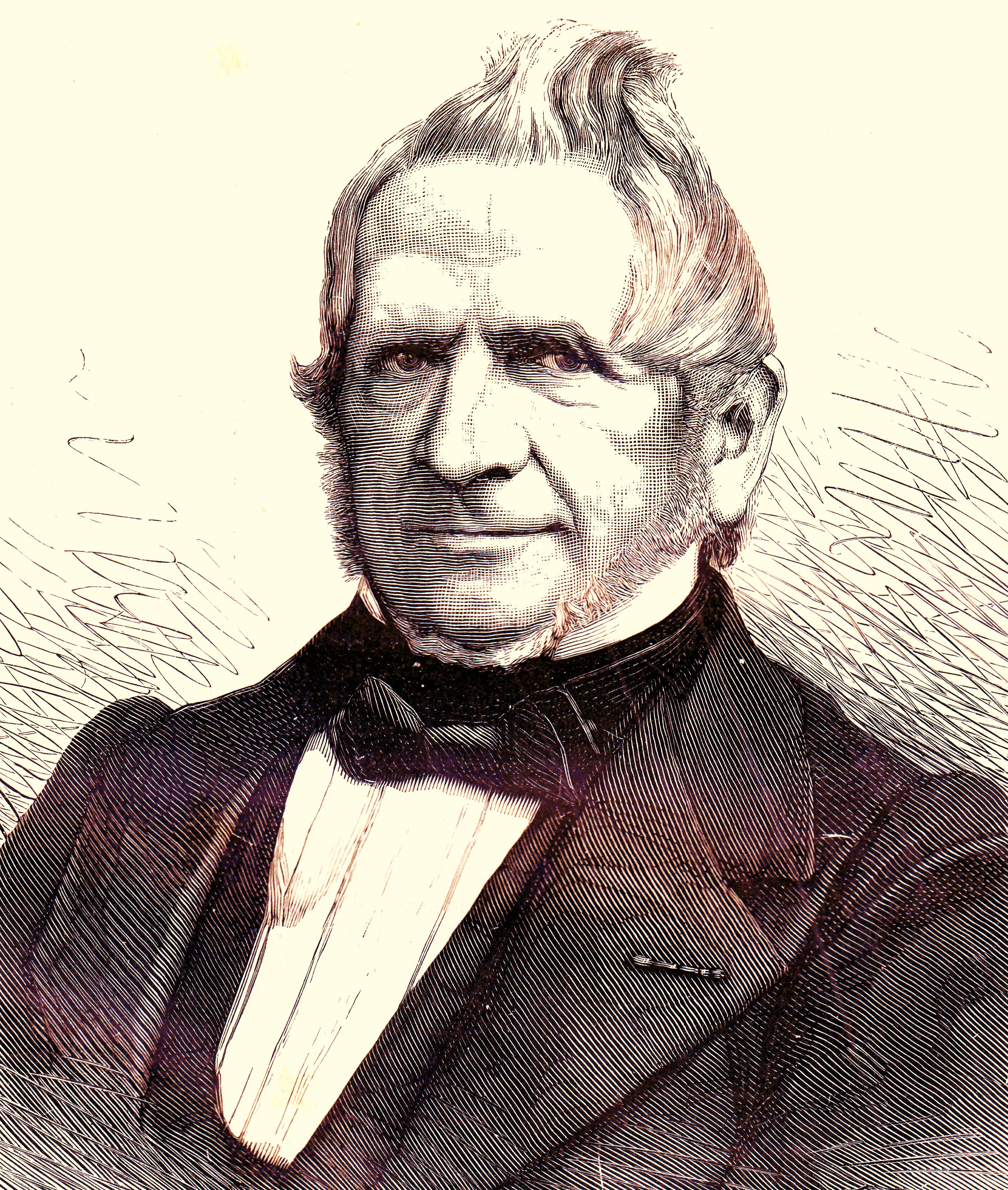
Dr. A Vrolik

Agnites Vrolik (28 February 1810 – 8 June 1894) was a Dutch politician. He was born in Amsterdam and died in Arnhem.
