= List of Dutch people in the United Kingdom =

This is a list of Dutch people in the United Kingdom, who are citizens or residents of the United Kingdom of Dutch origin.

- Audrey Hepburn, actress and humanitarian
- Jane Seymour, actress
- Nick Clegg, ex-leader of the Liberal Democrats (2007–2015) and Deputy Prime Minister of the United Kingdom during the Cameron–Clegg coalition
- Douglas Booth, actor
- Carol Vorderman, media personality
- Dick Taverne, politician

== See also ==
- Dutch people in the United Kingdom
- List of Dutch people
