= Amsterdam (disambiguation) =

Amsterdam is the capital and largest city of the Kingdom of the Netherlands.

Amsterdam may also refer to:

== Places ==
=== United States ===
- Amsterdam, California, a community
- Amsterdam, Georgia, an unincorporated community
- Amsterdam, Missouri, a city in Missouri
- Amsterdam, Montana, an unincorporated community
- Amsterdam, New Jersey, an unincorporated community
- Amsterdam (town), New York, a town
- Amsterdam (city), New York, a city within the town
- Amsterdam station (New York), a train station in Amsterdam (city), New York
- Amsterdam, Ohio, a village in Jefferson County, Ohio
- Amsterdam, Licking County, Ohio, an unincorporated community
- Amsterdam, Pennsylvania, an unincorporated community
- Amsterdam, Texas, an unincorporated community
- Amsterdam, Virginia, an unincorporated community
- Amsterdam Avenue (Manhattan), a street in New York City

=== Other places ===
- Amsterdam, Mpumalanga, a town in Mpumalanga, South Africa
- Amsterdam, Saskatchewan, a hamlet in Saskatchewan, Canada
- Bydgoszcz, Kuyavian–Pomeranian, Poland, nicknamed Polish Amsterdam
- Fort Amsterdam, Ghana, a sea-side fort and World Heritage Site in Kormantin, Ghana

== Ships ==
- Amsterdam (ship), ships named Amsterdam, owned by the Dutch East India Company and its pre-companies
- MS Amsterdam, a cruise ship owned and operated by Holland America Line
- Stad Amsterdam, a historical clipper reconstruction
- HNLMS Amsterdam, warships of the Royal Netherlands Navy
- USS Amsterdam (CL-101), a Cleveland-class light cruiser
- USS Amsterdam (CL-59), later redesignated to CL-59, an Independence-class aircraft carrier
- SS Amsterdam, a number of merchant ships
- HMHS Amsterdam, a WW2 hospital ship previously known as the SS Amsterdam, sunk by a mine while taking D-Day casualties back to England

== Literature and media ==
- Amsterdam (novel), a 1998 novel by Ian McEwan
- Amsterdam, a 1968 novel in the Nick Carter-Killmaster series
- "Hamsterdam", a 2004 episode of The Wire, was called "Amsterdam" on the first DVD release
- Amsterdam, the second part of the 2009 limited series Herogasm as part of The Boys comic book franchise
- Amsterdam, a 2009 Dutch film directed by Ivo van Hove
- Amsterdam (2013 film), a Canadian film directed by Stefan Miljevic
- Amsterdam (2022 film), an American film directed by David O. Russell
- Amsterdam Vallon, a character played by Leonardo DiCaprio in the movie Gangs of New York

== People ==
- Jane Amsterdam (b. 1951), American news and magazine editor
- Morey Amsterdam (1908–1996), an American comedian
- Robert Amsterdam (born 1956), a Canadian international lawyer
- Saul Amsterdam (1898–1937), a Polish communist
- Sibori Amsterdam (c. 1654–1690), 12th Sultan of Ternate
- Anthony G. Amsterdam, "Tony" Amsterdam, law professor

== Music ==
=== Performers ===
- Amsterdam (band), a pop band from the UK

=== Albums ===
- Amsterdam (The Lofty Pillars album)
- Amsterdam (Phish album)
- Amsterdam '08, a compilation album by Markus Schulz
- "Amsterdam", the scrapped name for the album The Marshall Mathers LP by Eminem

=== Songs ===
- "Amsterdam" (Jacques Brel song), a song by Jacques Brel
- "Amsterdam" (Imagine Dragons song), a song by Imagine Dragons
- "Amsterdam" (Van Halen song), a song by Van Halen
- "Amsterdam," a song from the album Orange by Al Stewart
- "Amsterdam," a song from the album God Forgives, I Don't by Rick Ross
- "Amsterdam," a song from the album Wedding Album by John Lennon and Yoko Ono
- "Amsterdam," a song from the album A Rush of Blood to the Head by Coldplay
- "Amsterdam," a song from the album Intriguer by Crowded House
- "Amsterdam," a song from the album Writer's Block by Peter Bjorn and John
- "Amsterdam," a song from the album Ode to Ochrasy by Mando Diao
- "Amsterdam," a song from the album Play Me Backwards by Joan Baez
- "Amsterdam," a song from the album Colours by Nadia Oh
- "Amsterdam," a song from the Broadway musical Passing Strange by Stew and Heidi Rodewald
- "Amsterdam," a song from the album Broken Machine by Nothing But Thieves
- "Amsterdam," a song from the album Qui by Michèle Torr
- "Amsterdam," a song from the album The Weatherman by Gregory Alan Isakov
- "Amsterdam," a song and single from the album Dynamite Daze by Kevin Coyne
- "Amsterdam," a song at the Eurovision Song Contest 1980 by Maggie MacNeal
- "Amsterdam," a song from the album Keep It Together by Guster

== Other ==
- Amsterdam station (disambiguation), stations of the name
- FC Amsterdam, a former Dutch association football club
- .amsterdam, a top-level domain for the city of Amsterdam
- New York Amsterdam News American weekly newspaper

== See also ==
- New Amsterdam (disambiguation)
- The Amsterdams, Romanian rock band
- Amsterdam Island (disambiguation)
