= Amsterdam Island (disambiguation) =

Amsterdam Island (French: Île Amsterdam) is a French island in the Indian Ocean

Amsterdam Island may also refer to:

- Amsterdam Island, Southwest Papua, an Indonesian island in Tambrauw Regency, Southwest Papua
- Amsterdam Island (Spitsbergen), a Norwegian island in the Arctic Ocean
- Tongatapu, an island of Tonga, once named Amsterdam
- Untung Jawa (Amsterdam Island), an Indonesian island off the coast of Java

== See also ==
- Amsterdam (disambiguation)
- New Amsterdam (disambiguation)
