= Embassy of the Netherlands, Jakarta =

Embassy of the Kingdom of the Netherlands, Jakarta
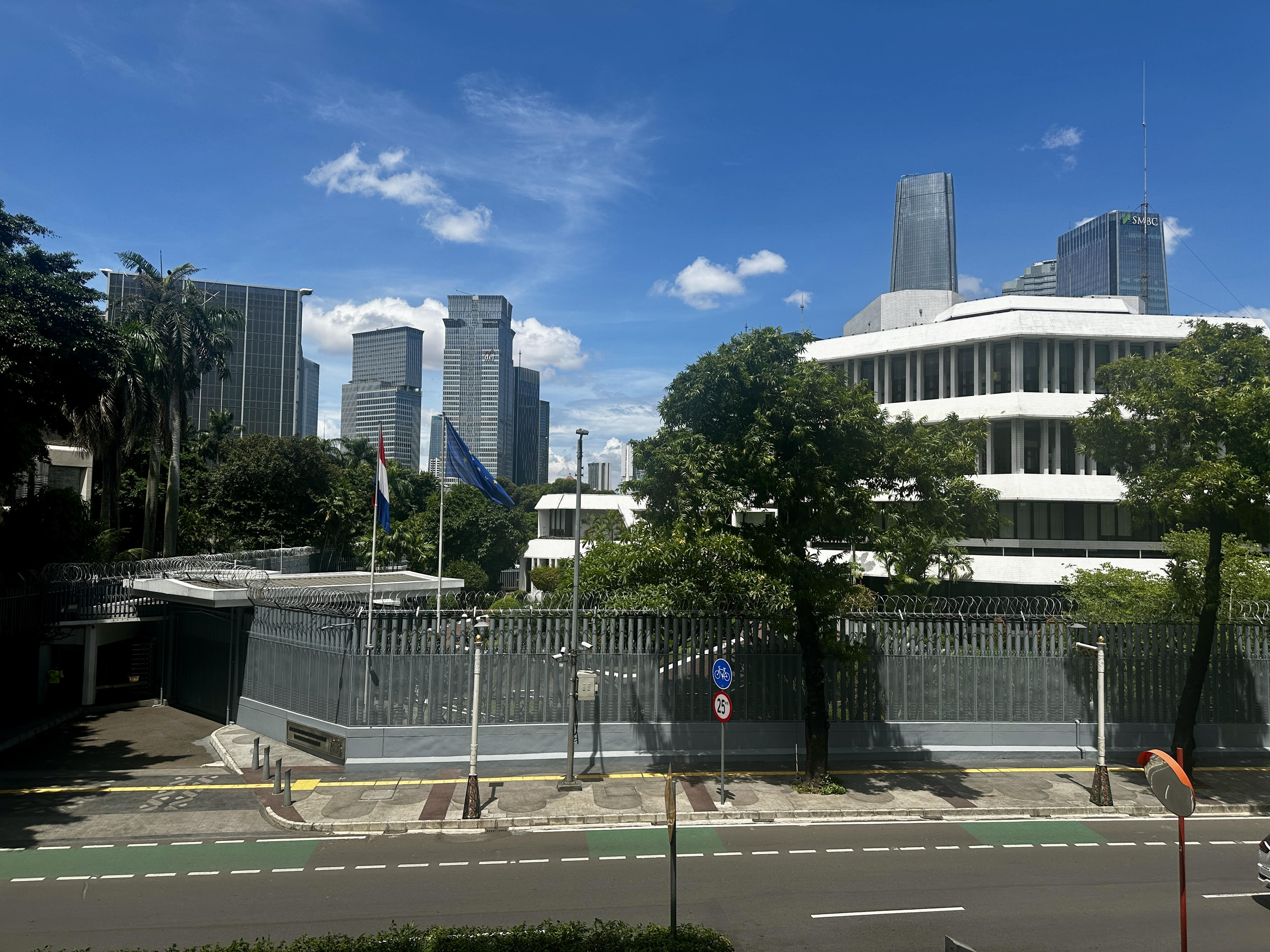
- Location: Jakarta, Indonesia
- Address: Jalan H. R. Rasuna Said No.Kav S-3, RT.8/RW.3, Kuningan, Setiabudi, South Jakarta
- Coordinates: 6.234439482715713°S 106.82848048650769°E
- Opened: 1950; 76 years ago
- Ambassador: Marc Gerritsen
- Website: Official website

The Embassy of the Netherlands in Jakarta (Dutch: Ambassade van Nederland in Jakarta; Indonesian: Kedutaan Besar Belanda di Jakarta) is the Netherlands' diplomatic mission in Jakarta, Indonesia. The Embassy of the Netherlands is located at Jalan H. R. Rasuna Said No.Kav S-3, RT.8/RW.3, Kuningan, East Kuningan, Setiabudi District, South Jakarta. The embassy is accredited to Timor-Leste and ASEAN. The current head of mission is Ambassador Marc Gerritsen.

The Embassy of the Netherlands in Jakarta is also the location of Erasmus Huis Jakarta.

== History ==
The history of the Dutch Embassy in Jakarta began in 1949, when Indonesia gained independence from Dutch colonial rule. Initially, relations between Indonesia and the Netherlands were quite tense and unfriendly. However, over time, the two countries began to build better diplomatic relations. Thus, in 1950, the Embassy in Jakarta was officially opened to strengthen diplomatic relations between Indonesia and the Netherlands. Since then, this embassy has become one of the most important embassies in Indonesia.

== Services ==
The Embassy of the Netherlands provides various services for Dutch citizens in Indonesia, as well as for Indonesian citizens who wish to travel or study in the Netherlands. Some of the main services provided are as follows:

1. Passport and visa issuance
2. Emergency services
3. Information and consultation

== Public transport access ==
- Transjakarta BRT: at Underpass Kuningan
- Jabodebek LRT: at Rasuna Said LRT station

== See also ==
- Indonesia–Netherlands relations
- List of diplomatic missions of the Netherlands
- List of diplomatic missions in Indonesia
- Embassy of Indonesia, The Hague
- Erasmus Huis Jakarta
