= Indonesia–Netherlands relations =

Diplomatic relations

- Indonesia: Netherlands

Diplomatic mission
- Embassy of Indonesia, The Hague: Embassy of the Netherlands, Jakarta

Envoy
- Ambassador Laurentius Amrih Jinangkung: Ambassador Marc Gerritsen

Indonesia and the Netherlands share a special relationship, rooted in their shared, multicentury history of colonial interactions. This began during the spice trade in the early 17th century with the establishment of trading posts by the Dutch East India Company in the Indonesian archipelago, and continued until the decolonisation of the Dutch East Indies in the mid-20th century. Indonesia was the largest former Dutch colony. Since the 2010s, the Dutch government has been committed to improving bilateral ties with Indonesia, with an emphasis on strengthening economic, political, and interpersonal contacts.

== History ==
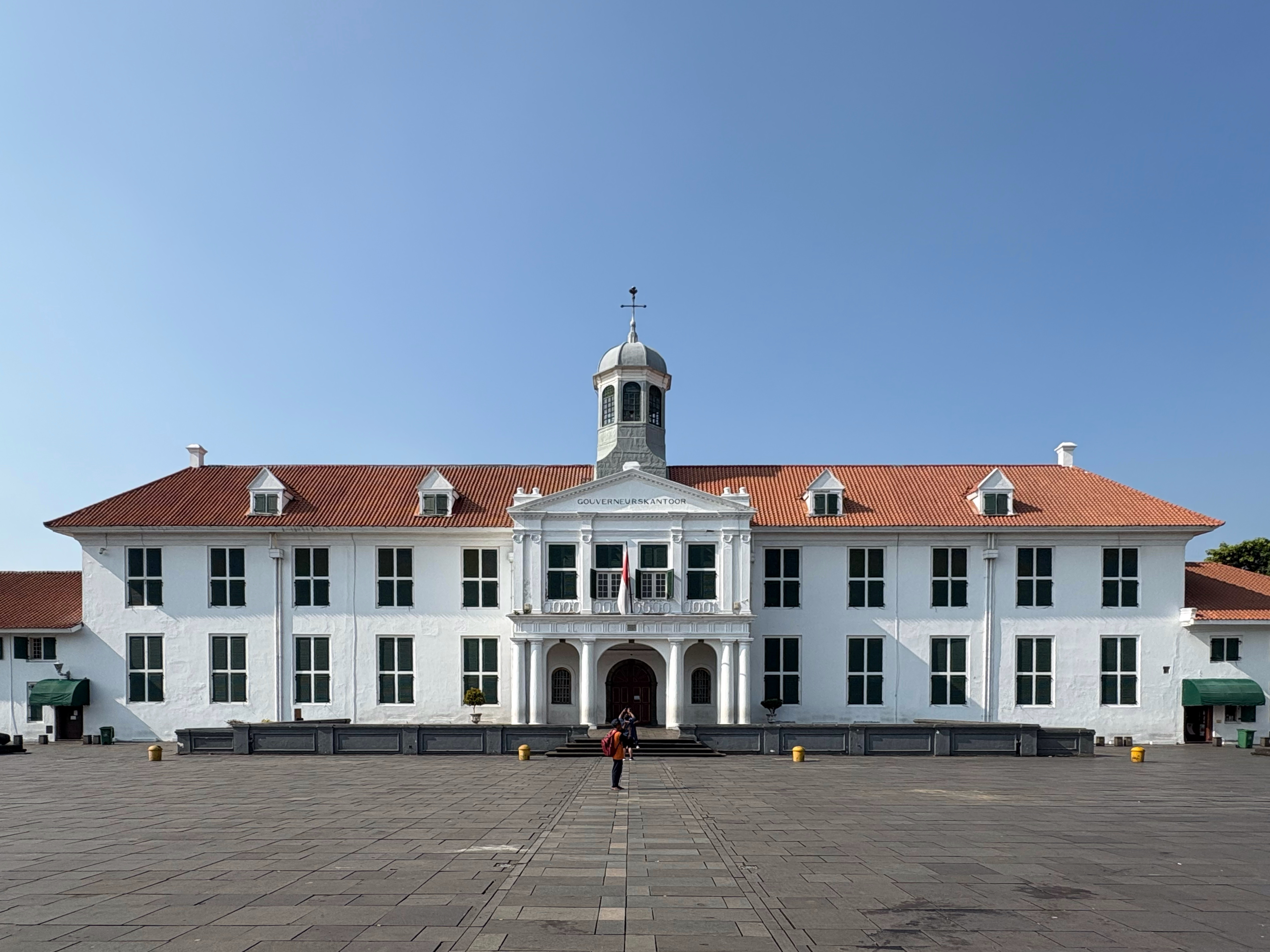
Stadhuis of Batavia, the former Asian headquarters of the VOC, now housing the Jakarta History Museum

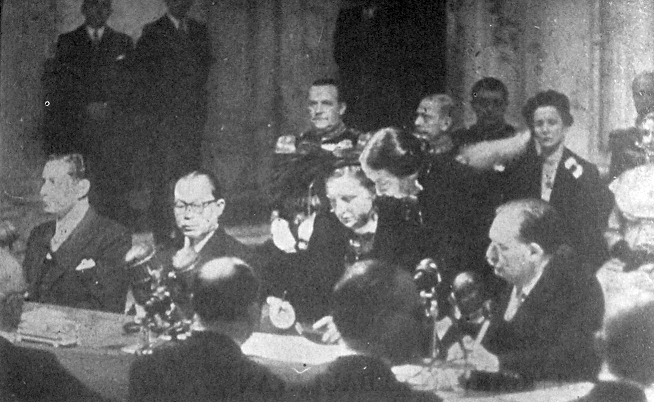
Mohammad Hatta and Queen Juliana sign the Hague Agreement in 1949

Brothers Cornelis and Frederick de Houtman were explorers who led the first Dutch expedition to the East Indies, which discovered shipping routes from the Dutch Republic to the Indonesian archipelago and successfully started the Dutch spice trade. In 1592, Cornelis de Houtman was sent by the merchants of Amsterdam to Lisbon to find as much information as possible about the Spice Islands (the present day Maluku Islands). By the time De Houtman returned to Amsterdam, the traders confirmed that Banten was the most appropriate place to buy spices. In 1594, they established the Compagnie van Verre (lit. 'long-distance company'), and on 2 April 1595, four ships left Amsterdam: Amsterdam, Hollandia, Mauritius and Duyfken. Cornelis de Houtman and his fleet arrived off the coast of the Banten Sultanate on 27 June 1596 and departed on 14 August 1597, bringing with them 240 bags of pepper, 45 tonnes of nutmeg, and 30 bales of mace.

In 1603, the Dutch East India Company (Dutch: Vereenigde Oostindische Compagnie, VOC) commenced operations in the Indonesian archipelago, where it waged wars to expand its trade monopoly. Though Indonesian history featured other European colonial powers, it was the Dutch who consolidated their hold on the archipelago. Following the bankruptcy of the VOC and the French and British interregnum, the Kingdom of the Netherlands assumed control of the colony in 1816. The Dutch government embarked on the conquest of the remaining independent indigenous polities in the region and enforced the exploitative Landrentestelsel (lit. 'land tax system') and Cultivation System until 1870. The Liberal Period that followed resulted in the adoption of the Ethical Policy in 1901, which included hesitant political reforms and provided modest improvements in economic and educational opportunities for the native population, but ended with the onset of the Great Depression. Even so, this short period of liberalisation inadvertently led to the Indonesian National Awakening and the development of Indonesian nationalism among the new, educated indigenous elite.

Following the end of World War II in Asia and the Indonesian declaration of independence in 1945, the Netherlands attempted to re-establish colonial rule, resulting in a bitter armed and diplomatic struggle. International pressure forced the Dutch to formally recognise Indonesian independence in December 1949. Headed by Queen Juliana, a loose union continued to exist between the Netherlands and Indonesia until 1956, when the growing West New Guinea dispute pitted the two countries against each other once more. In 1960, the Indonesian government under President Sukarno severed all diplomatic ties with the Netherlands and forcefully pursued their claim to Dutch New Guinea. Once again under international pressure, the Dutch yielded and agreed to a diplomatic compromise, whereby Indonesia gained control of the territory in May 1963. Diplomatic relations were restored in 1968 by the New Order government under second Indonesian President Suharto.

== Political relations ==
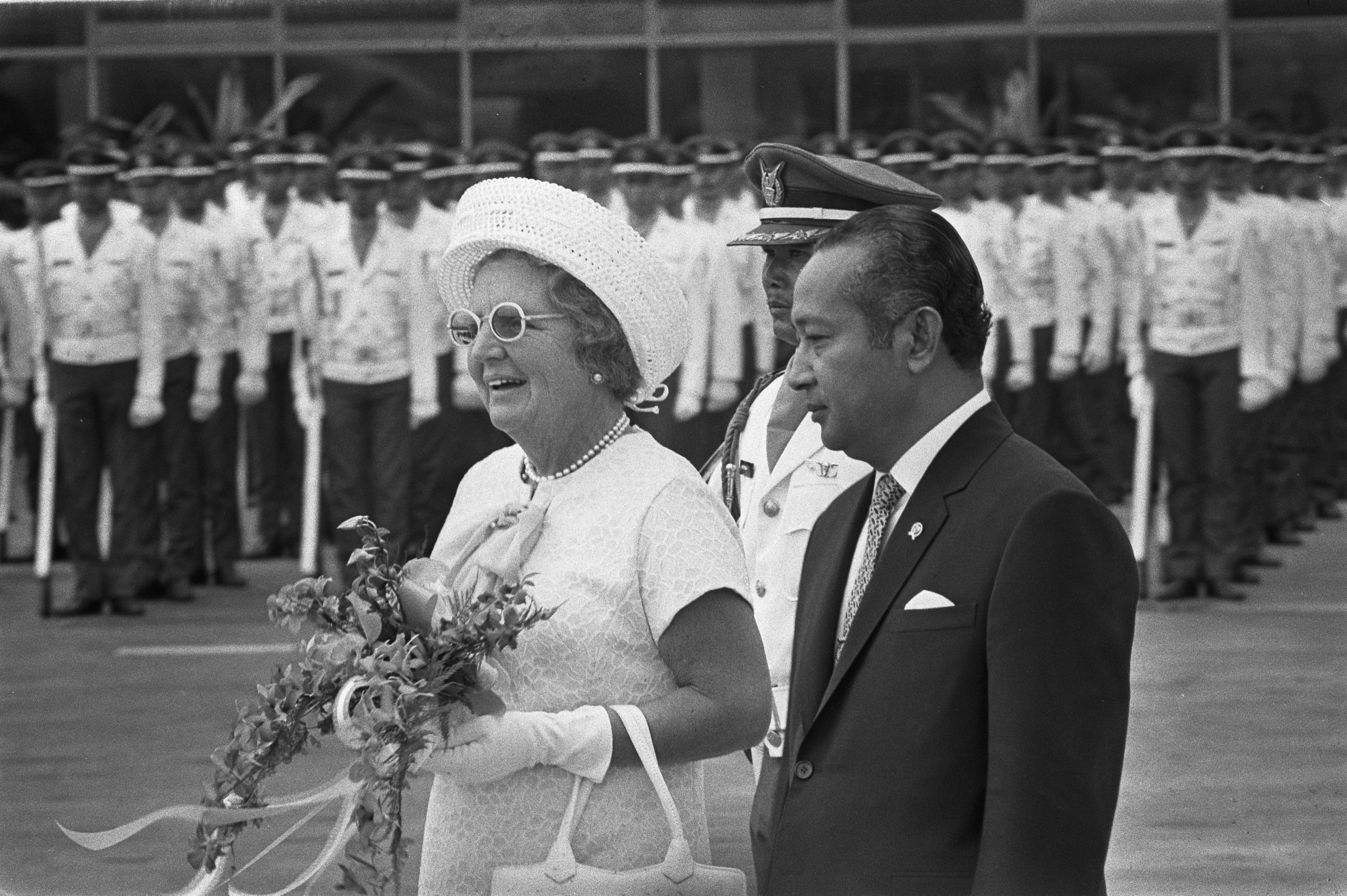
Queen Juliana and President Suharto in Jakarta, during her royal visit in 1971

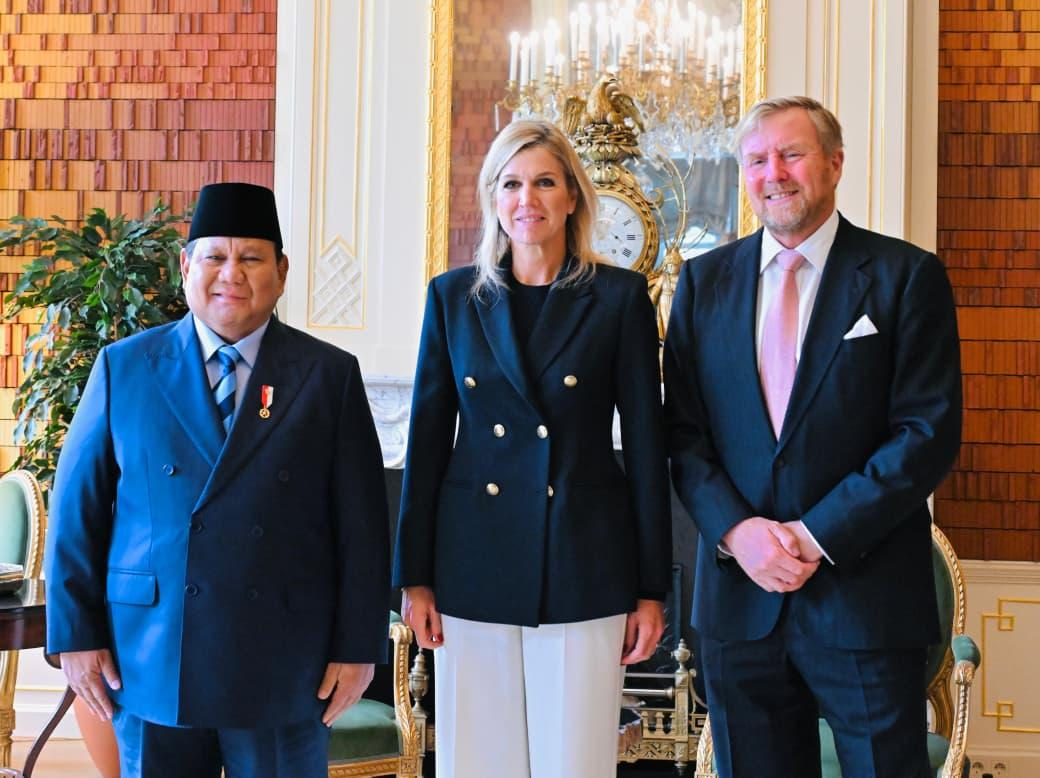
President Prabowo Subianto with Queen Máxima and King Willem-Alexander in 2025

In the past, relations between the two have been marred by the separatist intentions of the Free Papua Movement and the Republic of South Maluku. In this vein, they have attacked targets in the Netherlands in the 1970s and 1980s, seeking to force the country to pressure Indonesia into allowing for the secession of their nation. Political ties were then strained as Indonesian officials refused to visit the Netherlands while the group was allowed to bring cases to court against them. However, the visit of the Dutch Minister of Foreign Affairs Bernard Bot to Indonesia in 2005 to celebrate its 60th independence day anniversary was claimed by the Netherlands to have "marked a[n] historic moment in the relations between the two countries. After this visit, the relations between Indonesia and the Netherlands was further intensified and strengthened by the extension of the cooperation in a wide range of fields."

In 2010, Indonesian President Susilo Bambang Yudhoyono cancelled a visit to the Netherlands after the group's activists asked a Dutch court to issue an arrest warrant for him. The move was condemned by pro-Indonesia Moluccan activists in Jakarta.

=== High-level visits ===
In 1970, Indonesian President Suharto paid an official visit to the Netherlands, which was reciprocated by Dutch Queen Juliana and Prince Bernhard royal visit to Indonesia in 1971. Queen Beatrix and Prince Claus also paid a royal visit to Indonesia in 1995. On 22 April 2016, President Joko Widodo paid an official visit to the Netherlands. On 10 March 2020, King Willem-Alexander paid a royal visit to Indonesia and made surprise apologies for excessive violence used during the early years of Indonesian independence. On 25 September 2025, President Prabowo Subianto visited the Netherlands and held meetings with King Willem-Alexander and Queen Máxima Zorreguieta to maintain the positive relations between the two nations, especially their collaboration in science and culture.

== Economic relations ==
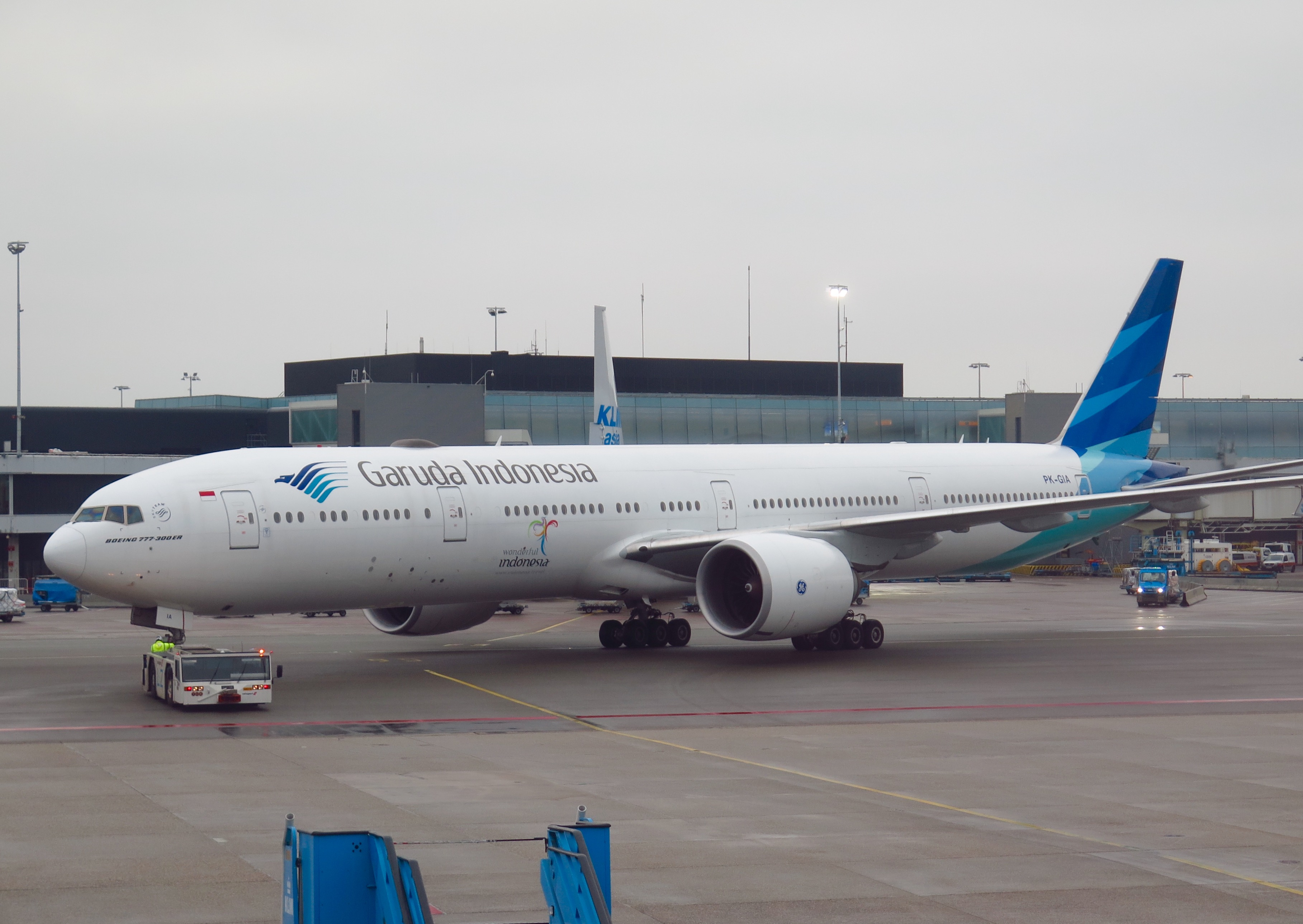
Garuda Indonesia Boeing 777-300ER in Schiphol Airport. The Netherlands has been a traditional gate for Indonesians to access Europe

The Netherlands is one of Indonesia's most important trade partners in Europe. Trade between the two countries in 2024 reached approximately US$ 5.7 billion. In terms of exports, Indonesia exports a variety of commodities such as palm oil, manufactured goods, footwear, textiles, and fishery products, while imports from the Netherlands are dominated by machinery, chemical products, pharmaceuticals, and high-tech goods. In addition to trade, economic ties between the two countries are also strengthened through investment, with the Netherlands consistently ranking among the top ten foreign investors in Indonesia, particularly in the manufacturing, logistics, and energy sectors.

The Port of Rotterdam and Schiphol Airport have been the main entry points for Indonesian products into the European Union. Similarly, Dutch companies have seen Indonesia as their gateway to the larger ASEAN market, which is home to more than 500 million people.

=== Development assistance ===
For over 25 years, from 1966 to 1992, development assistance was provided by the Netherlands to Indonesia within the arrangements of the Inter-Governmental Group on Indonesia (IGGI). IGGI had been established in the late 1960s to help coordinate the flow of foreign aid to Indonesia, and was convened and chaired by the Dutch government for over two decades throughout the 1970s and 1980s. However, in the early 1990s, the then-Minister for Development Cooperation in the Netherlands, Jan Pronk, became increasingly critical of domestic policy in Indonesia. In response, in early 1992, the Indonesian government indicated that it no longer wished to participate in the annual IGGI meetings in The Hague and preferred that a new donor consultative group, the Consultative Group on Indonesia (CGI), be established and be chaired by the World Bank.

== Military relations ==
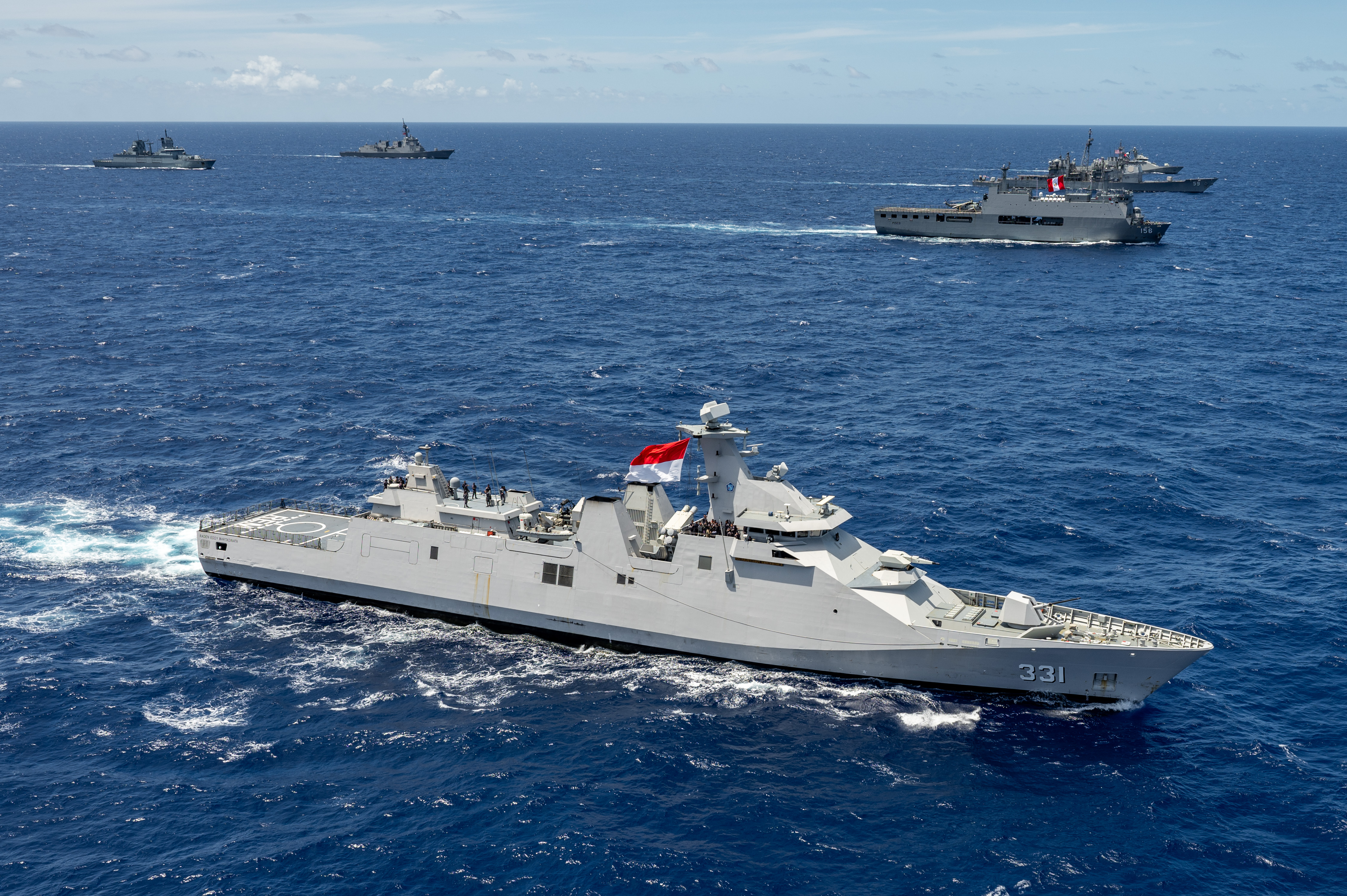
Martadinata-class frigate made by Damen Schelde and PT PAL

Following a period of conflict during the Indonesian National Revolution and the West Irian dispute, defense cooperation was suspended until the normalization of diplomatic relations in the 1970s. This cooperation has developed through various formal mechanisms, such as the 2014 MoU, as well as industrial projects and multinational exercises. Today, the Indonesian military procures naval vessels from the Dutch, such as Van Speijk-class frigates and Sigma-class corvettes. The two countries also exchanged experiences in peacekeeping operations under the mandate of the United Nations.

== Cultural ties ==
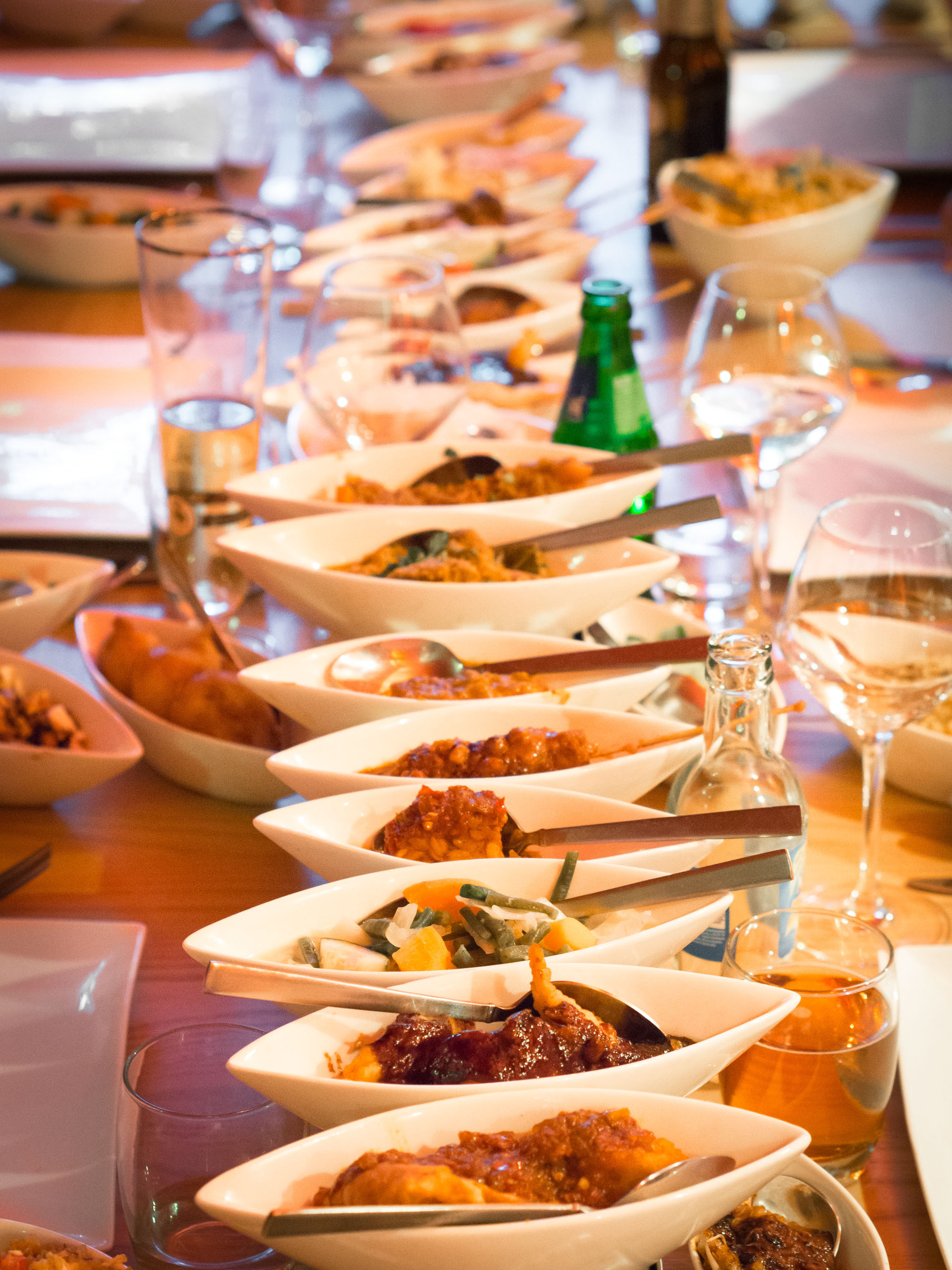
Rijsttafel, the culinary link between the Netherlands and Indonesia

Traces of Dutch influences in Indonesia include Dutch origin loanwords in Indonesian and cuisine. Some Indonesian dishes have been adopted and, in turn, influenced Dutch cuisine. The Dutch influence on Indonesian cuisine is evident in various dishes such as lapis legit (spekkoek), meses, nastar, kastengel and klappertaart. Conversely, in the Netherlands, the influence of Indonesian cuisine is very strong and has become part of the national culinary culture, particularly through dishes such as rijsttafel—which evolved from the tradition of serving Indonesian colonial dishes—as well as the popularity of satay and nasi goreng. Indonesian restaurants are also easy to find in various cities across the Netherlands.

Christianity in Indonesia was a result of proselytisation by mainly Dutch missionaries. There is also a sizable Indonesian population in the Netherlands. Many have set up their own churches in what has been termed as a "reverse mission," referring to the Dutch missionaries in the colonies.

Another legacy of colonial rule in Indonesia is the legal system that was inherited from the Dutch. In 2009, the Dutch Minister of Justice Ernst Hirsch Ballin visited Indonesia in what some considered a stepping stone to reforming its legal system.

Through centuries of colonial relations, numbers of cultural institutions in the Netherlands—such as Tropenmuseum and Rijksmuseum voor Volkenkunde in Leiden—have extensive collections of Indonesian archaeology and ethnology artefacts. Both are the leading centres of Indonesian studies in Europe, specialised in its culture, history, archaeology and ethnography. The Erasmus Huis—the Netherlands' cultural centre—was established in 1970 in Jakarta. It was meant as cultural cooperation to promote art and cultural exchanges between Indonesia and the Netherlands. Besides many exhibitions, music performances and films screenings, some lectures on Dutch and Indonesian culture are being held on a regular basis in their auditorium and gallery. Several universities in the Netherlands, such as Leiden University, have Indonesian studies centers that actively conduct research on Indonesian history, language, and culture. In 2024, the Indonesian government officially opened Indonesia House Amsterdam in Amsterdam as a hub for promoting Indonesia's economy, trade, and culture in the Netherlands and Europe.

== Multilateral organizations ==
Both countries are members of the United Nations, World Trade Organization, International Monetary Fund, G20 major economies, World Bank, and among others.

== Resident diplomatic missions ==
- Indonesia has an embassy in The Hague.
- The Netherlands has an embassy in Jakarta.
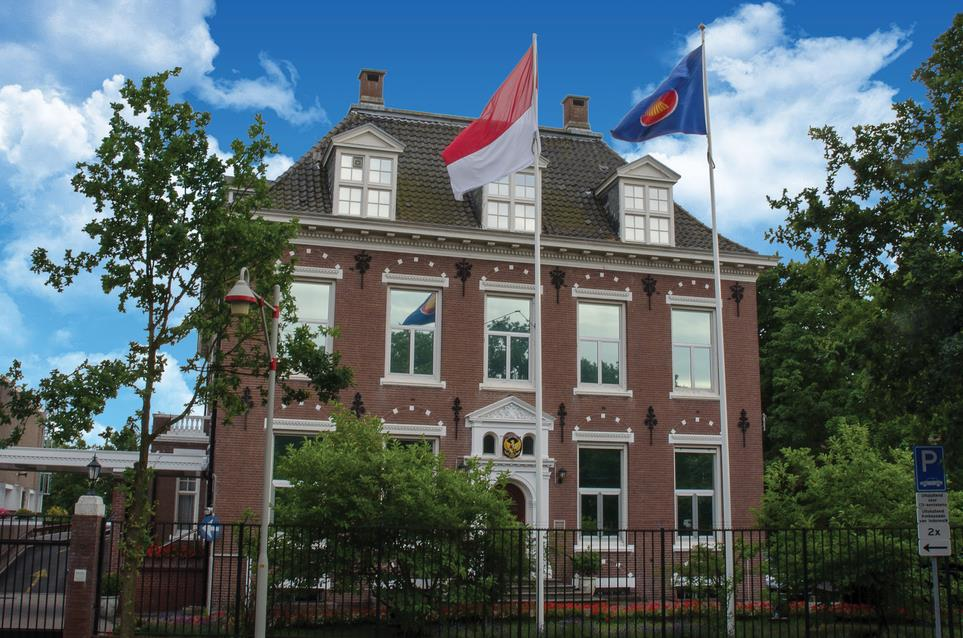
Embassy of Indonesia in The Hague

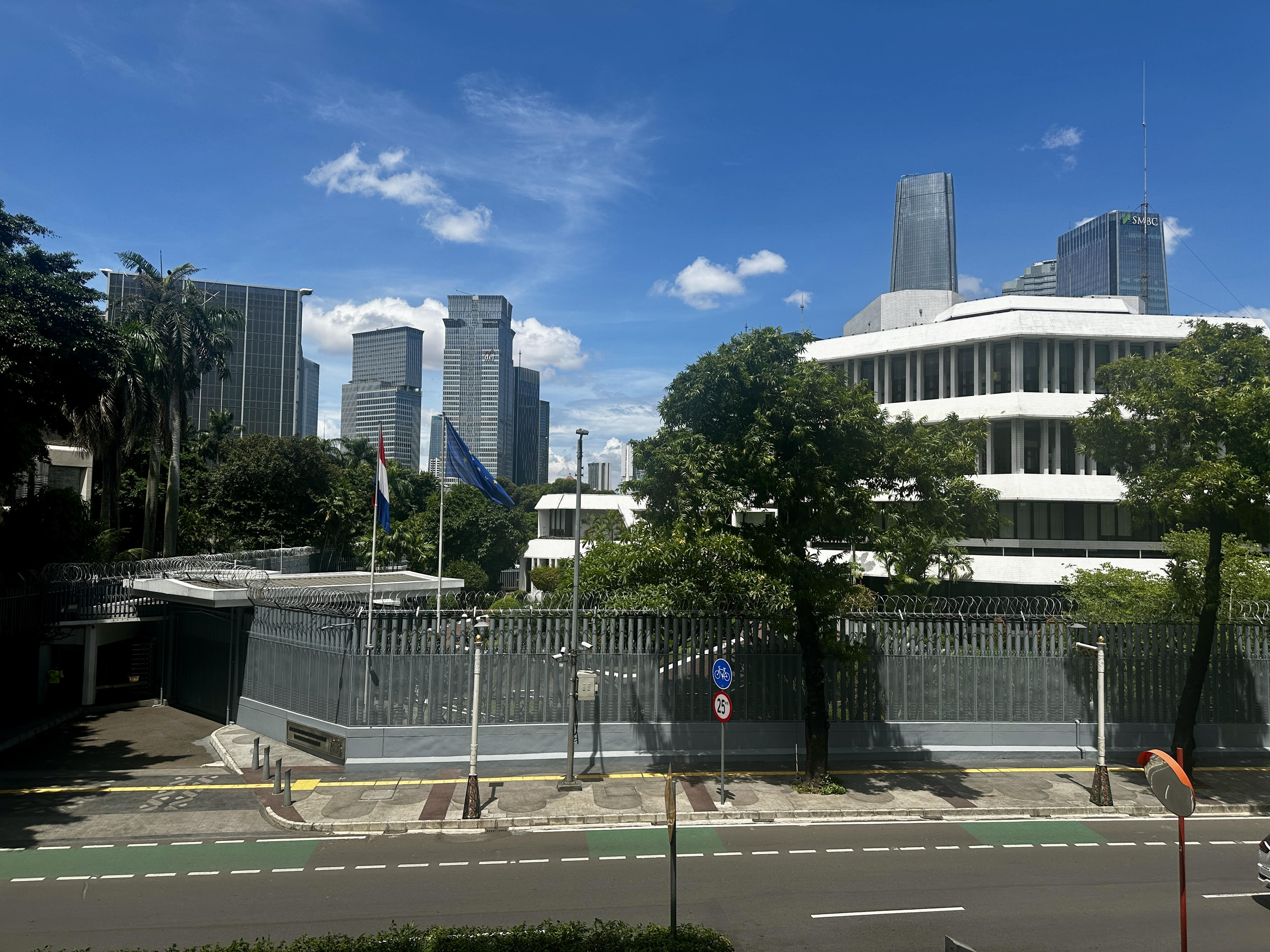
Embassy of the Netherlands in Jakarta

== Notable Indo-Dutch people ==
- Giovanni van Bronckhorst
- Boudewijn de Groot
- Irfan Bachdim
- Alex Van Halen
- Eddie Van Halen
- Daniel Sahuleka
- Nyck de Vries
- Geert Wilders
- Simon Tahamata

== See also ==
- Foreign relations of Indonesia
- Foreign relations of the Netherlands
- Indo people
