= Middleburg Island =

Island in Southwest Papua Province

Native name: Mnukasun, Pulau Kecil
- Location within Indonesia

Geography
- Location: Tambrauw Regency, Southwest Papua
- Coordinates: 0°22′08″S 132°11′44″E
- Area: 1.33 km^{2} (0.51 sq mi)
- Highest elevation: 22 m (72 ft)

Administration
- Indonesia

Additional information
- Time zone: Indonesia Eastern Time (UTC+9)

Middleburg Island is an island in the Tambrauw in Southwest Papua province of eastern Indonesia. It is part of the Su Islands (Mios Su) or the Soe Island Group.

== See also ==
- Amsterdam Island
- Middleburg Airfield
