= Amsterdam station =

Amsterdam station may refer to:

- Amsterdam Street station, a QLine stop in Detroit, Michigan
- Amsterdam station (New York), a train station in Amsterdam, New York
- List of railway stations in Amsterdam

== See also ==
- Amsterdam (disambiguation)
