= Amsterdam Island, Southwest Papua =

Island in Indonesia

Amsterdam Island
Native name: Mnueba, Pulau Besar
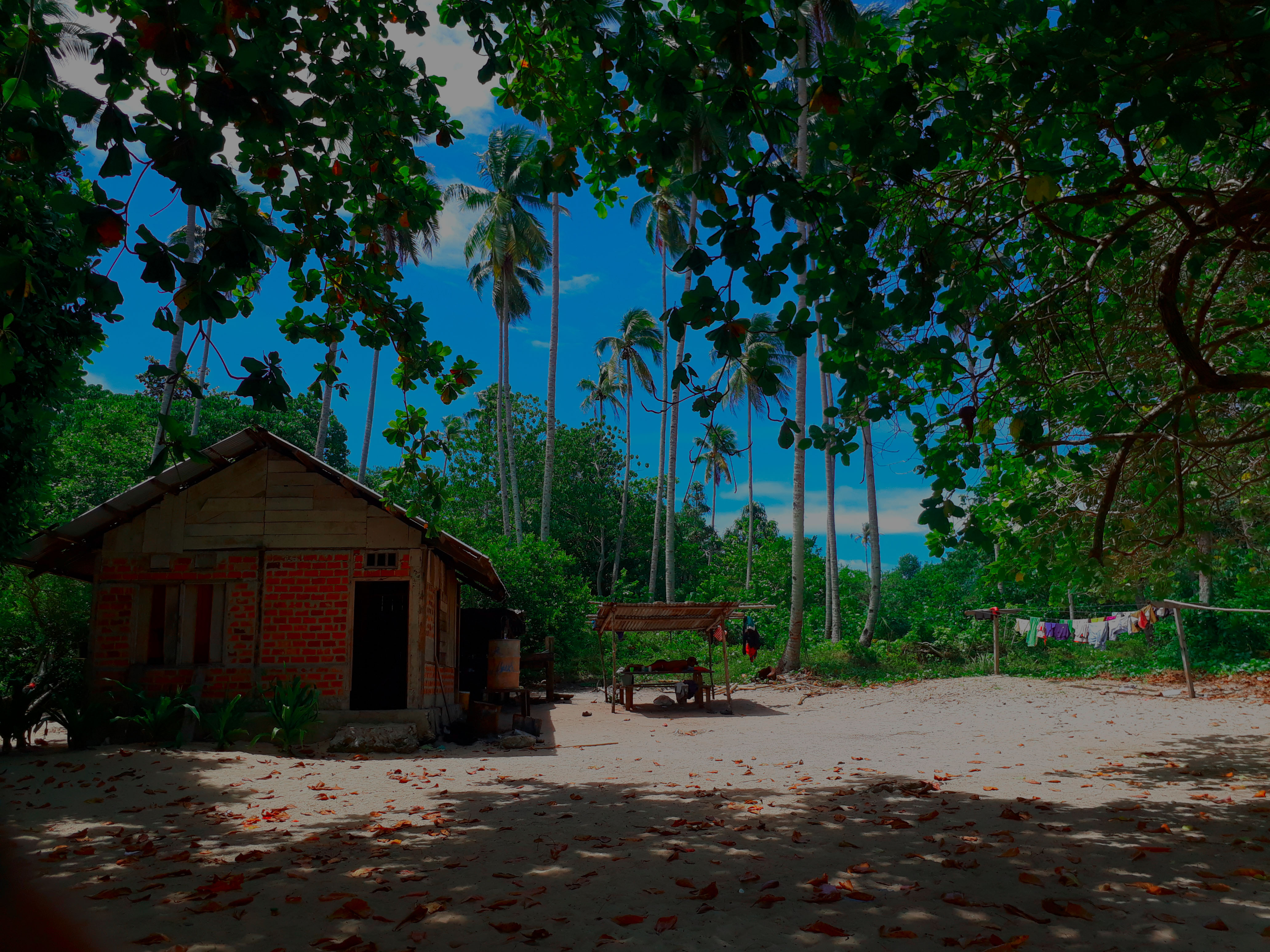
- Amsterdam Island Beach

- Location within Indonesia

Geography
- Location: Tambrauw Regency, Southwest Papua
- Coordinates: 0°20′48″S 132°10′11″E
- Area: 1.03 km^{2} (0.40 sq mi)
- Highest elevation: 22 m (72 ft)

Administration
- Indonesia

Additional information
- Time zone: Indonesia Eastern Time (UTC+9)

Amsterdam Island is an island in the Tambrauw in Southwest Papua province of eastern Indonesia. Part of the Su Islands (Mios Su) or the Soe Island Group.

== See also ==
Middleburg Island

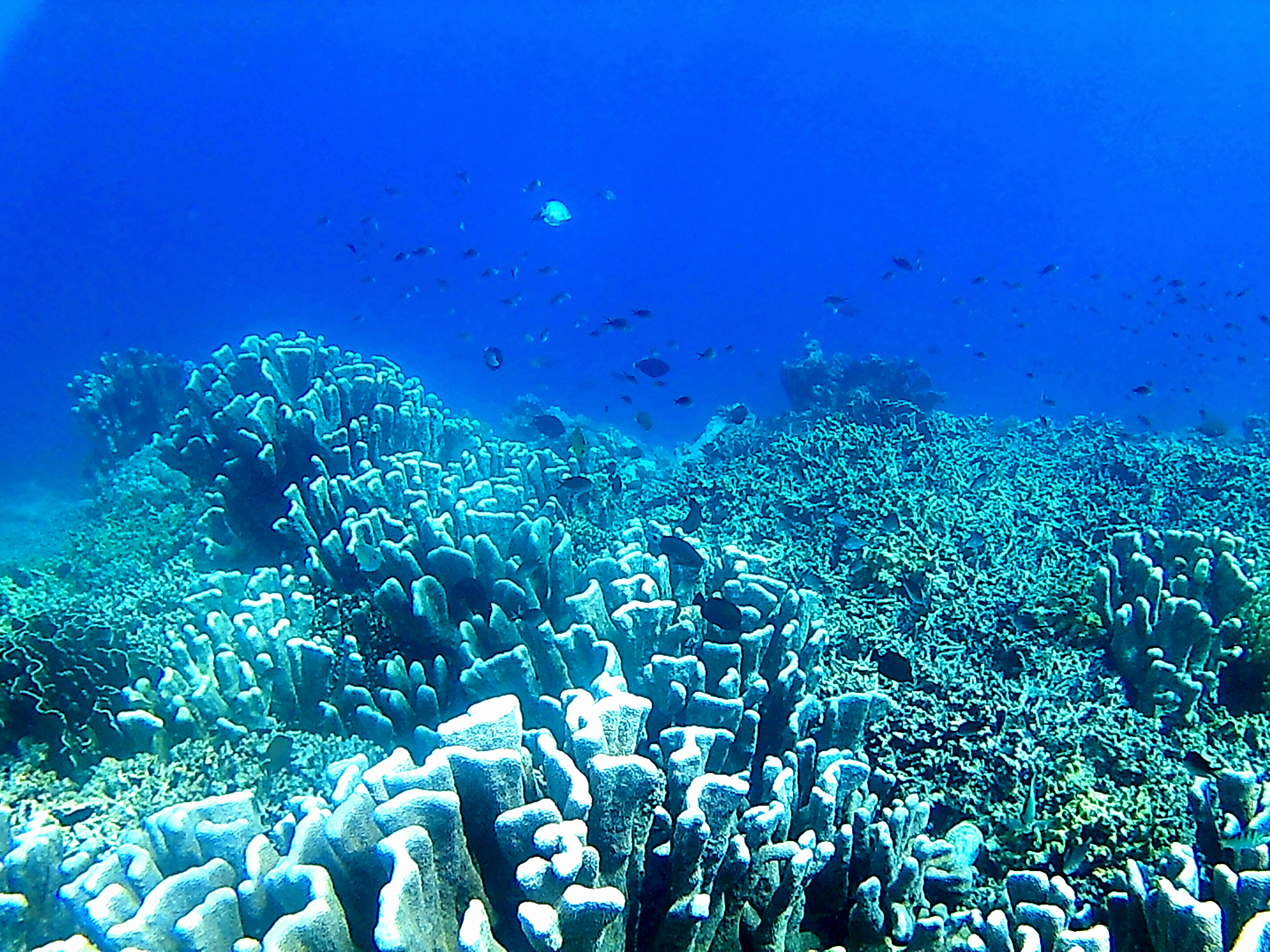
Corals near Pulau Amasterdam Island
