= HNLMS Amsterdam =

HNLMS Amsterdam (Dutch: Hr.Ms. or Zr.Ms. Amsterdam) may refer to following ships of the Royal Netherlands Navy:

- HNLMS Amsterdam (D819), a Friesland-class destroyer
- HNLMS Amsterdam (A836), a replenishment ship
