= SS Amsterdam =

A number of steamships have been called SS Amsterdam, including:

- SS Amsterdam (1879)
- SS Amsterdam (1894), a passenger ship built for the Great Eastern Railway, later operated by the London and North Eastern Railway and scrapped in 1928
- SS Amsterdam (1918), a trawler launched in 1918 as SS Amsterdam, later renamed Empire Zest
- SS Amsterdam (1922), a tanker built in 1922 by Sir W G Armstrong & Co Ltd for Petroleum Industrie Maatschappij NV, Den Haag. Torpedoed and sunk in 1942.
- SS Amsterdam (1930), a passenger ship built in 1930 by John Brown & Company in Clydebank for the London and North Eastern Railway, later a hospital ship in WW2
- SS Amsterdam (1950), a passenger ship built in 1950 by John Brown & Company for British Railways, sold to Chandris Line in 1970 and renamed Fiorita. Capsized and sank at Fethaye, Turkey in 1987.
