= Saul Amsterdam =

Polish communist politician (1898–1937)

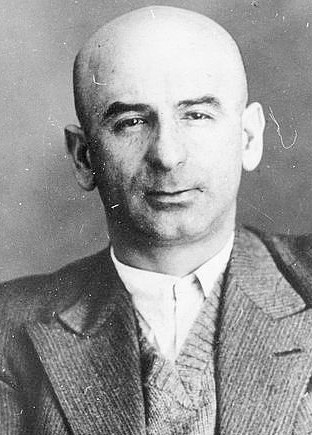
Saul Amsterdam after being arrested by the NKVD in 1937.

Saul Amsterdam (Russian: Генрих Самойлович Генриховский-Амстердам, romanized: Genrikh Samoylovich Genrikhovskiy-Amsterdam, 17 March 1898, Nowy Sącz – 1 November 1937), also known as Gustaw Henrykowski, was a Polish communist activist, a lawyer by profession. Initially, a member of the Poale Zion 1918–1921, and from 1923, a member of the Central Committee of the Communist Party of Poland (KPP). Between 1933 and 1934 Amsterdam was a member of the Politburo of the Central Committee of the KPP. He also was a journalist and involved in the activities of the Communist International.

Amsterdam was executed in the Great Purge in Moscow in 1937.
