= The Amsterdams =

Romanian indie rock band

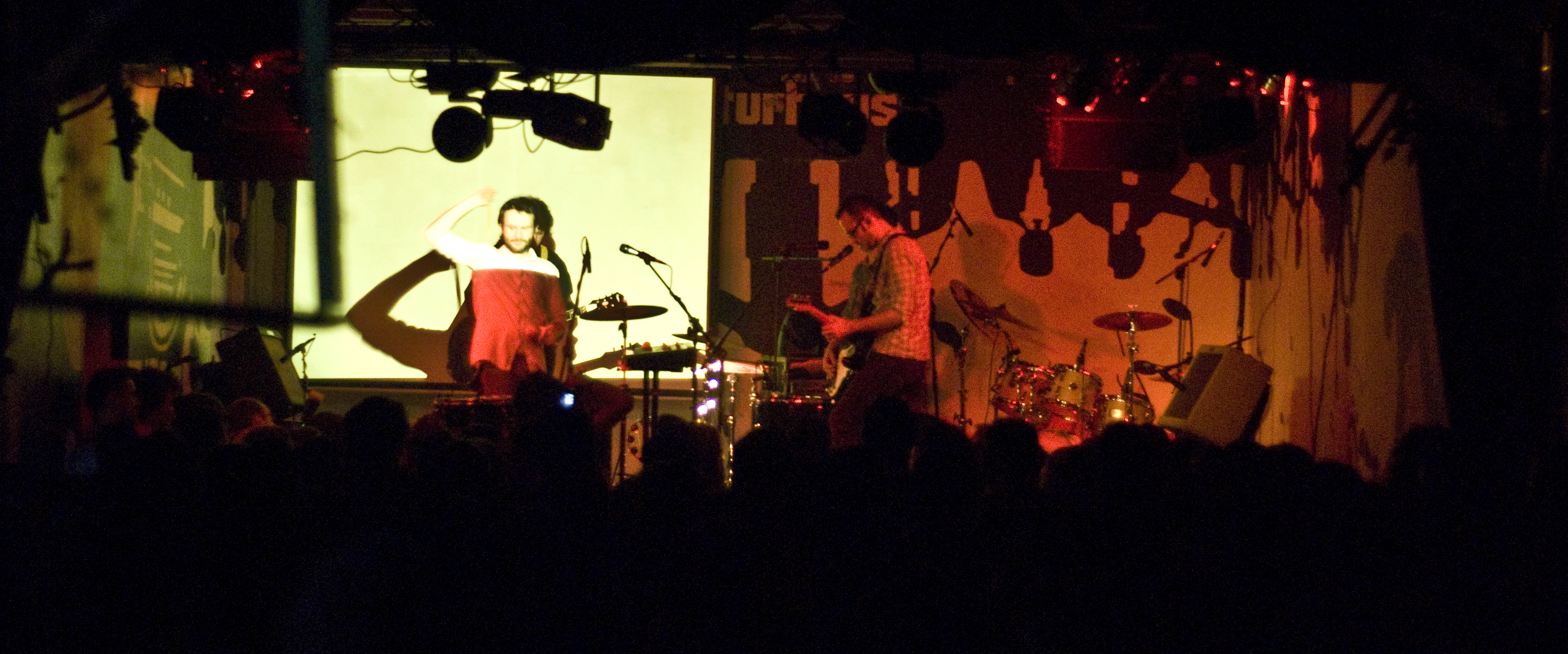
- The Amsterdams at the official release of their second album, Electromagnetica, in Kulturhaus Club, Bucharest. Left: Ovidiu Bejan. Right: Andrei Haţegan

Background information
- Origin: Bucharest, Romania
- Genres: Alternative rock Indie rock Electronica
- Years active: 2005–present
- Label: Post POP Records
- Members: Andrei Hațegan; Victor Ghioca; Raul Bularca; Sorin Erhan
- Past members: Dan Olaru; Alex Ghiță; Paul Ballo; Vlad Stoica; Chris Olsman; Augustin Nicolae; Dragoș Crifca; Andrei Ungureanu; Ovidiu Bejan; Gabriel Ciocan

The Amsterdams are a Romanian alternative rock / indie rock band formed in Bucharest in 2005. Their current line-up consists of Andrei Hațegan (lead vocals, guitar), Victor Ghioca (drums, percussion), Raul Bularca (lead guitar, backing vocals), Sorin Erhan (bass guitar).

As of 2026, The Amsterdams have released four studio albums, an EP and thirteen videos. The band has toured in the United Kingdom, France, Spain, the Netherlands, Italy, Hungary, the Czech Republic and India and has opened for bands like The Cranberries, Wolf Parade, Nazareth, Roxette and Handsome Furs.

== History ==
=== Formation and early years (2005–2007) ===
The Amsterdams were formed at the beginning of 2005 by Andrei Hațegan and Andrei Ungureanu, following an advertisement posted by Hațegan. Both musicians were big fans of the British alternative scene, listening to bands like Radiohead, The Smashing Pumpkins, Travis, Oasis and The Stone Roses. Shortly after, they were joined by the bass guitarist Dan Olaru and the drummer Vlad Stoica. The name of the band was especially chosen to express the idea of artistic freedom, or, as Andrei Hațegan puts it:

We weren't actually fond of the hard, garage, underground, chemical elements or funeral-like names, so we thought that the best we could do was to choose a name that would've express the idea of free spirit, in all of its aspects, which is why Amsterdams came up really naturally. The is because people had to know that we were those Amsterdams... The only ones!

The band played its first gig in 2006, in Big Mamou Club, Bucharest. That summer, Stoica and Olaru left The Amsterdams due to musical divergences, and formed a new band, called The Guillotines. Olaru was replaced by Augustin Nicolae, and shortly after the band was joined by the guitarist Ovidiu Bejan. During the following months, The Amsterdams struggled hard to find a new drummer, working with no less than thirteen people; eventually, they chose Alex Ghiță.

In 2007, the band recorded two songs, "Taking Care Of Anna" and "Fireworks". "Taking Care Of Anna" was played on a local radio station, 89FM, while "Fireworks" was included on a compilation called The Next Dog Desert Island Selection, produced by Roadrunner Music. Later that year, The Amsterdams were invited to play at the third edition of UnderLondon2 Festival, in Bucharest. They were also part of the line-up for Stufstock 5 Festival, which had The Dandy Warhols as headliners. Their performance impressed the American band and led Courtney Taylor-Taylor to dedicate to them the song "Country Leaver", calling them "the best Romanian band".

In autumn the line-up changed. Ghiță left the band, and was later replaced by Paul Ballo (Go to Berlin).

=== Automatic (2008–2009) ===
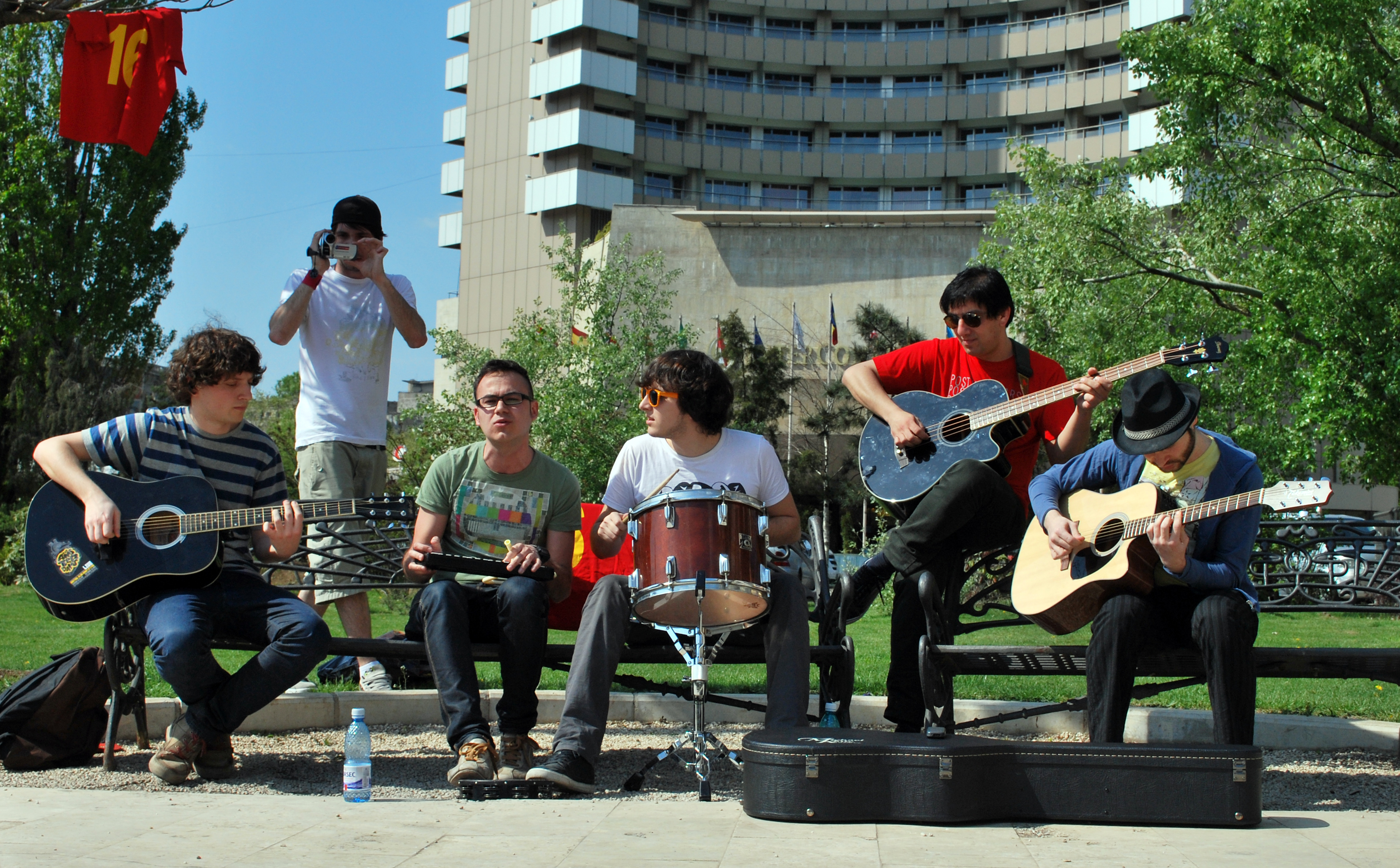
The Amsterdams playing in the National Theatre Park in Bucharest, April 2009. Left to right: Andrei Ungureanu, Andrei Haţegan, Vlad Stoica, Augustin Nicolae, Ovidiu Bejan.

On May 28, in Fire Club, the band released their first studio material, an EP called Automatic with four songs. They also released their first video, for the song "Petrolize All Mice".

Following this release, The Amsterdams played at the Europa Vox Festival, in France and then went to London for a gig in the Dublin Castle Club. The EP was promoted in the United Kingdom, gaining some favorable reviews. "Suffering And Surfing" and "Petrolize All Mice" were played on several minor radio stations, like Cambridge University Radio and at BBC6 Music.

In summer 2008, the band was invited to several festivals, such as Peninsula, B'Estfest and Stufstock, this time on the main stage, with Apocalyptica and Air Traffic. Meanwhile, Stoica rejoined the band, replacing Ballo.

At the end of February 2009, the band opened the series of live concerts broadcast on MTV Romania's official website, a project destined to promote local alternative music. In April, The Amsterdams performed an unplugged gig at the local radio station ProFM, including some songs from their first album. The radio station subsequently invited them to play during its sixteenth anniversary.

=== Adolessons (2009–2010) ===
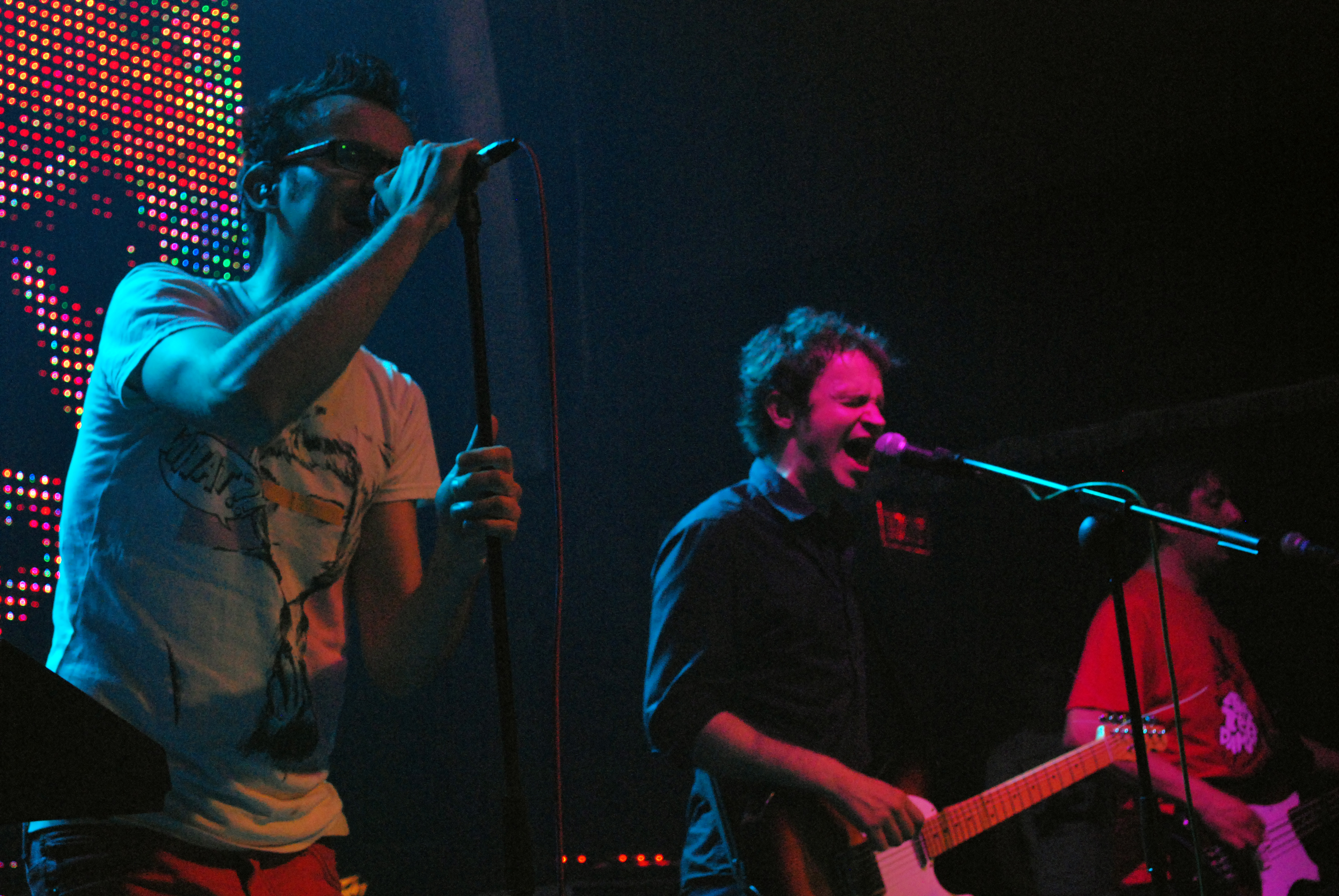
The Amsterdams at the official release of their first album, Adolessons, in Silver Church Club, Bucharest

On May 22, 2009, The Amsterdams released their first studio album, called Adolessons. The release gig took place at The Silver Church Club in Bucharest, with Doru Trăscău (AB4, The Mono Jacks), Dan Olaru and Alex Ghiță (Rain District) as guests. The band performed the new songs from the album and some old songs.

The album was produced, distributed and edited by the band, under their own label, Post Pop Records. It was recorded at the Studio ISV, mixed by Alex Dragomir at Raza Studio and mastered by Christian Mike Sugar at CSM-Lab Bucharest. Andrei Hațegan explained the title in an interview:

We're still living in a musical adolescence, as we're not playing together for a long time, and the album tells the story of all these years. It's like a lesson we have to learn while we're adolescents, for having a happy life afterwards...

The band also filmed and released a video for the first single, "Chased by the Housewives". It was directed by Anamaria Lazarovici and first shown on MTV Romania's official website. The singer, Hațegan, explained this choice by stating "We chose to make a video for this song because we like it a lot, it has less than four minutes, so it can be aired on TV without any problems, and, least but not last, because we were forced to do so." while bassist Augustin Nicolae specified "We thought that it's the kind of infectious song - it's like when you get a flu and it sticks with you from April until August. Even after you get well, you'll remember perfectly why you got sick in the first place."

In September 2009, following an invitation from The Blog Parties, the band performed two gigs in two cities in the Netherlands, Utrecht (Ekko Club) and Amsterdam (Winston Club).

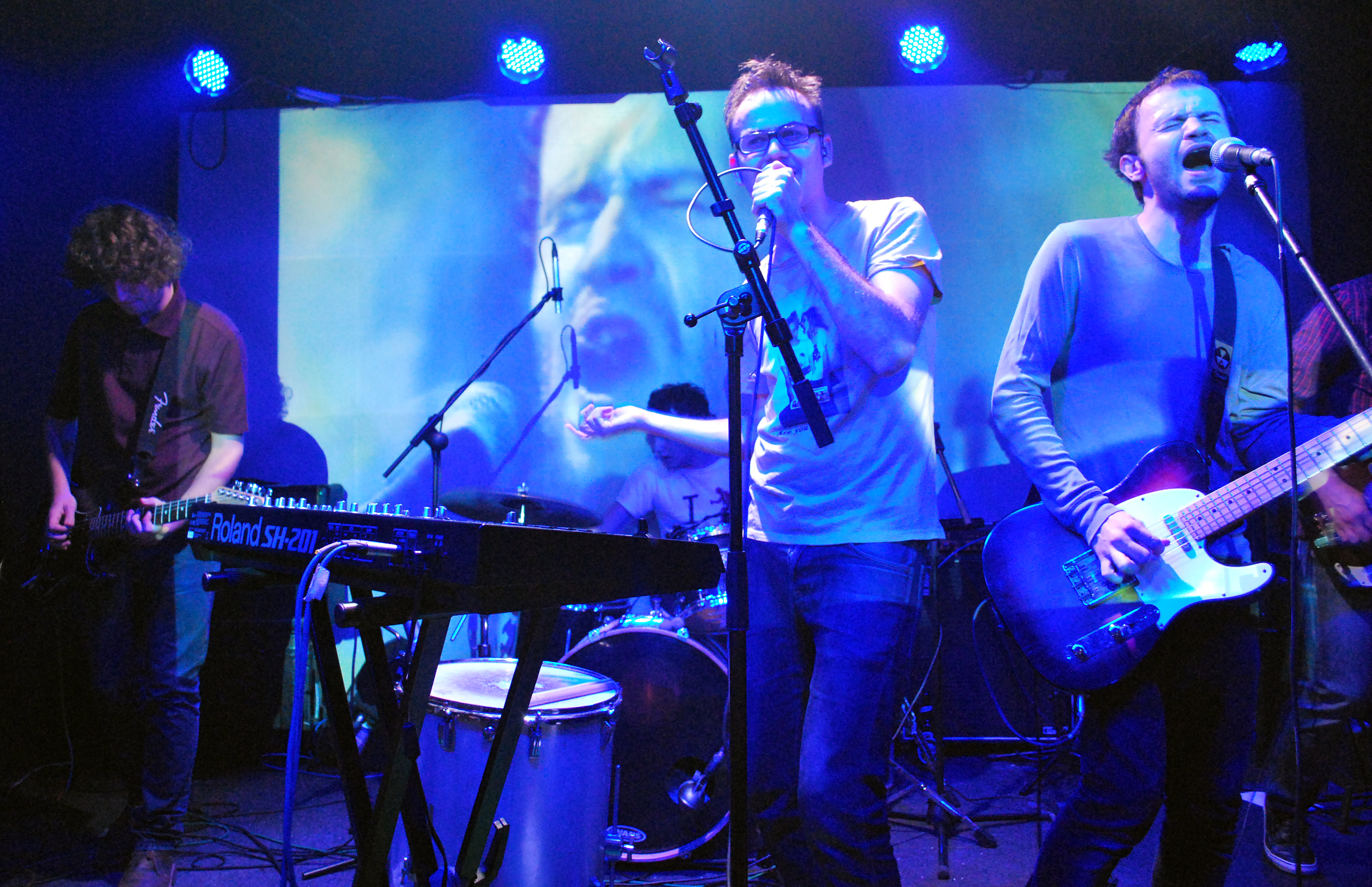
The Amsterdams opening for Handsome Furs in Control Club, Bucharest

In October, The Amsterdams and The Mono Jacks played as opening acts for the Canadian band Handsome Furs in Control Club, Bucharest. Impressed by The Amsterdams, the lead singer of Handsome Furs, Dan Boeckner, agreed to collaborate with them on a song. Initially called "Burial Ground For Two", the song later appeared on their second studio album under the name "This Burial Ground's For Two".

At the beginning of 2010, The Amsterdams had their first national tour, Home And Dry Tour 2010; they performed in several cities from the north-east of Romania and also in Chişinău, Moldova.

On April 17, 2010, the band released a video for the song "Apple". The video, directed by Irina Stănciulescu (also known as Color Nurse), was projected during the concert held by the band on a roof above a record store in Bucharest, called Off the Record.

In May, The Amsterdams were invited to tour with Wolf Parade as the opening act. The Canadian band was promoting its newest studio album. The Romanian band performed in Budapest, Prague, Salzburg, Bologna and Turin. In July, The Amsterdams opened for The Cranberries at a concert in Bucharest.

During the winter, drummer Stoica left the band. The remaining members eventually decided to give up the search for a new drummer and to continue as a four piece band instead.

=== Electromagnetica (2011–2013) ===
At the beginning of 2011, The Amsterdams finished recording their second studio album, Electromagnetica. In February, a month before the official release, the band went to the UK to promote the new material. A song from it, "Coalmine", had previously been played on BBC6 Music.

The official release of Electromagnetica took place on March 3, at Kulturhaus Club, Bucharest. The release concert had Hot Casandra and Sophisticated Lemons performing as opening acts with Electric Brother (the producer of Electromagnetica) and Vlad Stoica as guests. The name of the album comes from Electromagnetica, a factory in Bucharest, inside which the band has a rehearsal room.

The album was released as a digital download on April 1 and received several positive reviews. The band described their new material as being more elaborate than Adolessons.

At the end of May, The Amsterdams performed in Zaragoza, Spain. The gig was part of a multidisciplinary project called Zaragoza Latina, which was supposed to encourage the development of interest in Latin culture.

On August 31, the band released a fourth video, "Summertime", directed by Alina Manolache. The song has Roxana Niculae (We Singing Colors) on vocals and was recorded at The Great Below Studio, mixed by Paul Ballo and mastered by Cristian Varga. Hațegan said in an interview that the band would release a video for the song "Coalmine" as well.

On October 8, The Amsterdams performed at Sala Polivalentă in Bucharest, with Electric Brother, Morcheeba and Parov Stelar Band.

On June 13, 2012, twenty-two years after the June 1990 Mineriad, the band released a video for "Coalmine". It was produced by piq.ro and it is a compilation of various events filmed in Bucharest during the Mineriad.

In July, The Amsterdams started a campaign on their official website to promote their new single, "Sunology". The site showed the cartoon versions of the band members underwater, with no oxygen supplies. Website visitors had to type O2 multiple times, until the band members emerged from the sea; at that point, the song could be heard clearly and the visitors were invited to download the song for free, to watch the video on YouTube and to share it on Facebook. The video includes parts of Eu, tu și Ovidiu (Me, you and Ovidiu), a Romanian film directed by Geo Saizescu.

In September, the band was invited to play at MTV Romania, during the first local edition of "MTV Unplugged". This was followed by several other concerts in various cities across the country, including a concert in Panic! Club in November, when the band opened for Ken Stringfellow.

The Amsterdams continued their touring in 2013 as well, and were invited to play at several Romanian festivals such as Peninsula Félsziget and Focus Festival.

=== Winds Apart and the preparations for the new album (2013–present) ===
On December 19, 2013, The Amsterdams released their first unplugged album, Winds Apart, followed by a video for the song "Where To Go", directed by Alina Manolache.

Winds Apart consisted mainly of re-recorded songs from Adolessons and Electromagnetica, with the notable exception of "Crackers" and "Where To Go". The band stated that the work to the album took a year, and although more than twenty songs were recorded, only fifteen made it on the final release. They also confirmed that a new album was in the making.

After touring for several months as a four piece to promote Winds Apart, The Amsterdams started working with Dutch drummer Koen Christiaan Olsman (former Gram, ETTG) who joined them as a full member during their tour through Romania. Shortly after, they released their new single, "Twin Song", which became available as free download on the Internet.

That summer, the band played on various festivals such as La Dâmburi (Satu Mare), Hesh Fest (Baia Mare), cLoverFest (Mușcel, Moroeni) and Bucovina Rock Castle, sharing the stage with bands like Nazareth and Alternosfera.

On August 27, The Amsterdams performed an acoustic concert during Urban Resort #2, at Fabrica Club in Bucharest.

In September, the band played at Bucharest Days, in University Square, and at Funk Rock Hotel, during a special edition which allowed the public to choose the line-up for the event.

In October, the band headlined day one of the Romanian fEAST Festival in the Borderline in London. In December, they played in Control and received a nomination for the Best Romanian Rock Band at Maximum Rock Awards.

On December 27, 2014, The Amsterdams played their first show in Phoenix, Mumbai, at the start of their first tour in India. Afterwards, they headlined the Mood Indigo Festival 2014, Mumbai as part of the International Music Festival, sold out the Blue Frog, Mumbai and the B-Flar in Bangalore and finished with a headlining show on the second day of the Saarang Festival (Chennai).

In May, The Amsterdams opened for Roxette along with Swedish band Eskobar; the concert took place at Arenele Romane, in Bucharest.

During the summer of 2015, The Amsterdams performed at various festivals and cultural events, such as Music Travel Folk Festival in Timișoara, Indirekt Festival (Croatia), Natura Fest, Copacul cu Cărți and Grădina cu Filme.

On October 30 2015, The Amsterdams released a new song, called "The Great Fire", during a concert which took place at Bounce Club, in Bucharest. Following the Colectiv nightclub fire, which took place the same evening, The Amsterdams posted a message on Facebook, announcing their intention to donate money to the victims of the fire and their families, as well as their participation to the protests that started as a reaction to the tragedy.

=== Eternity for Dummies (2016–present) ===
On 12 April 2016 the band released their 4th full-length studio record, called "Eternity for Dummies" during a sold out concert in Control Club in Bucharest. The record was released on Universal Music Romania with the 2nd single release called "Arrows" after which the band went on a club tour throughout Romania.

In May 2025 Victor Ghioca joined the band as the new drummer.

Starting with January 2026 the band coopted Raul Bularca as the new guitarist and Sorin Erhan as the new bass player.

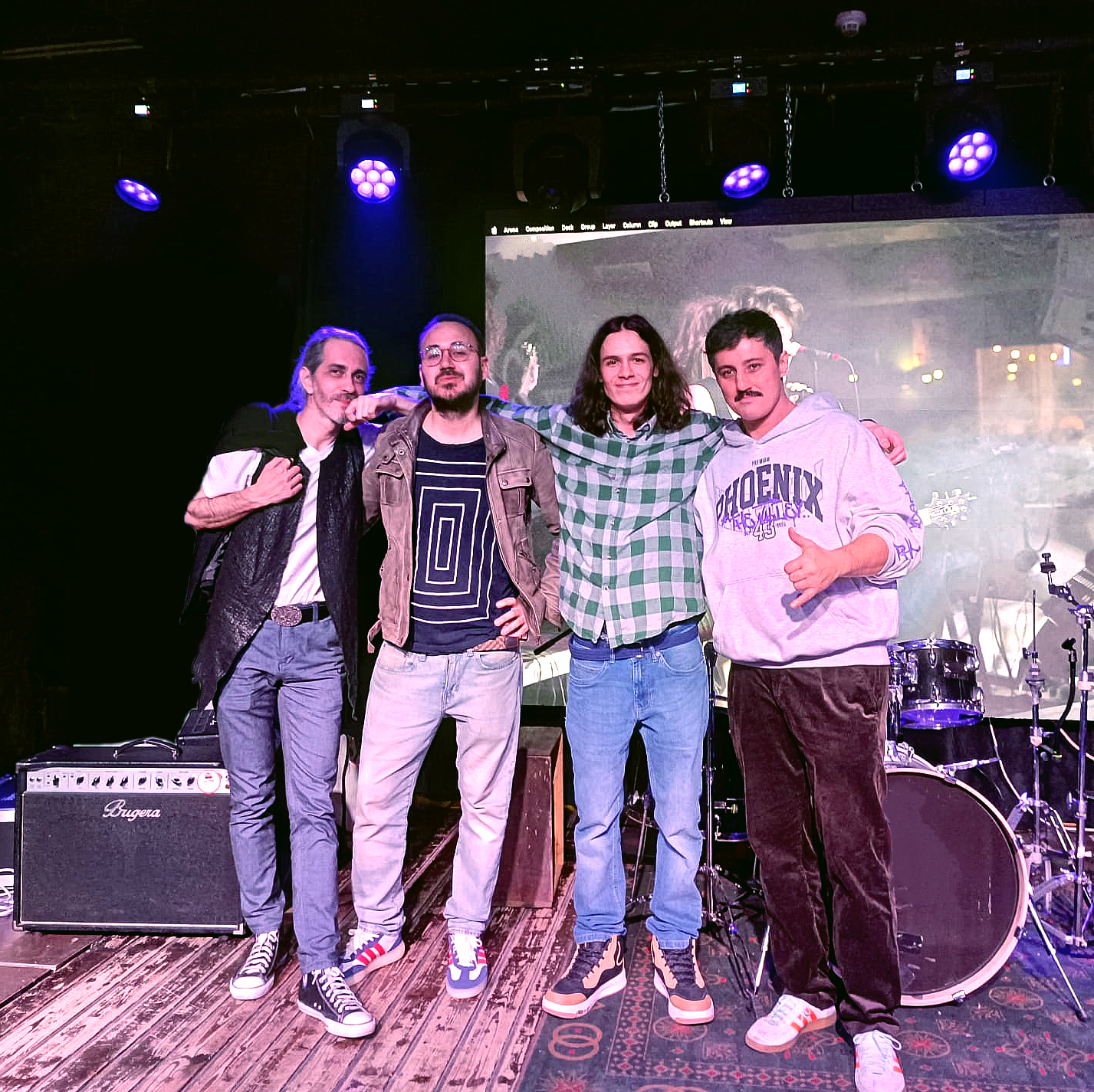
The Amsterdams in 2026

== Discography ==
Studio albums

- Adolessons (2009)
- Electromagnetica (2011)
- Winds Apart (2013)
- Eternity for Dummies (2016)

EPs

- Automatic (2008)

== Members ==
Current members

- Andrei Hațegan – lead vocals, keyboards, guitar, percussion (2005–present)
- Victor Ghioca - drums, percussion (2025-present)
- Raul Bularca - lead guitar, backing vocals (2026-present)
- Sorin Erhan - bass guitar (2026-present)

Former members

- Dan Olaru – bass guitar (2005–2006)
- Alex Ghiță – drums (2006–2007)
- Paul Ballo – drums (2007–2008)
- Vlad Stoica – drums (2005–2006; 2008–2010)
- Chris Olsman – drums, percussion (2014–2016)
- Augustin Nicolae – bass guitar, percussion (2006–2017)
- Andrei Ungureanu – guitar (2005–2025)
- Dragoș Crifca – bass guitar (2017–2025)
- Ovidiu Bejan – guitar, keyboards, backing vocals, percussion (2006–2025)
- Gabriel Ciocan – drums, percussion (2017–2025)
