= Embassy of Indonesia, The Hague =

Diplomatic mission of the Republic of Indonesia to the Netherlands

Embassy of the Republic of Indonesia in The Hague Kedutaan Besar Republik Indonesia di Den Haag Ambassade van de Republiek Indonesië in Den Haag

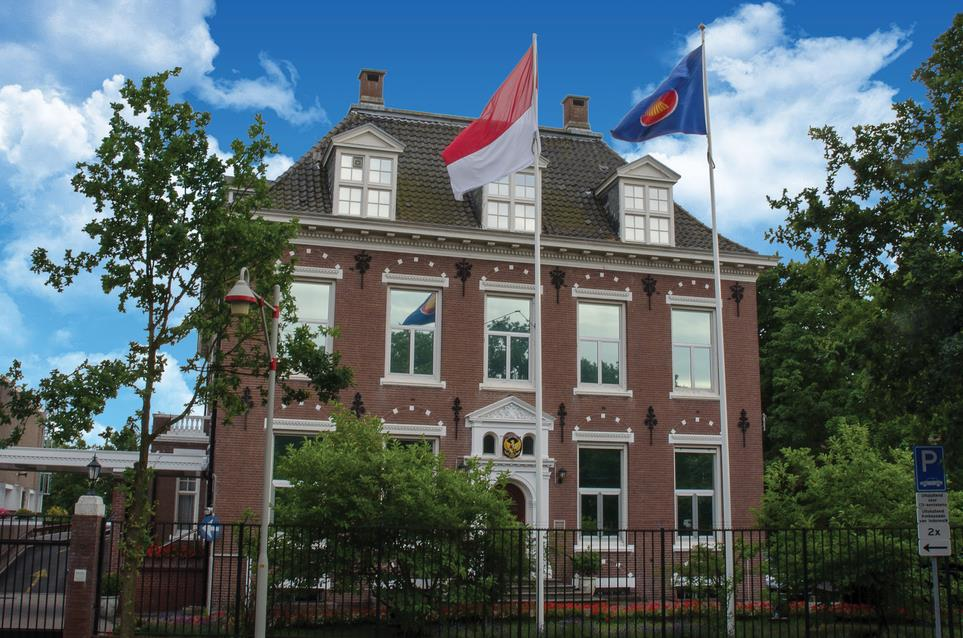
- Location: The Hague, Netherlands
- Address: Tobias Asserlaan 8, 2517 KC; The Hague, Netherlands
- Coordinates: 52.08605°N 4.28867°E
- Ambassador: Mayerfas
- Jurisdiction: Netherlands; Organisation for the Prohibition of Chemical Weapons

Rijksmonument
- Designated: 18 October 1994
- Reference no.: 477397
- Website: kemlu.go.id/denhaag

The Embassy of the Republic of Indonesia in The Hague (Indonesian: Kedutaan Besar Republik Indonesia di Den Haag) is the diplomatic mission of the Republic of Indonesia to the Netherlands. The embassy is located in Scheveningen district of The Hague and is currently headed by Ambassador Mayerfas which was appointed by President Joko Widodo on 14 September 2020.

== History ==
Indonesia established diplomatic relations with the Netherlands as a republic in 1949 after Dutch–Indonesian Round Table Conference where the Dutch formally recognized Indonesia's sovereignty. Its first ambassador was Mohammad Roem which took office in 1950.

== See also ==
- Indonesia–Netherlands relations
- List of diplomatic missions of Indonesia
- List of diplomatic missions of Netherlands
