= New Amsterdam (disambiguation) =

New Amsterdam was the Dutch colonial settlement that later became New York City.

New Amsterdam or Nieuw Amsterdam may also refer to:

== Places ==
- New Amsterdam, Indiana, a town in Indiana, U.S.
- New Amsterdam, Guyana, a town in East Berbice-Corentyne Region, Guyana
- New Amsterdam Public Hospital, the hospital in New Amsterdam, Guyana
- New Amsterdam, Wisconsin, an unincorporated community in Wisconsin, U.S.
- New Amsterdam, New Holland, a former Dutch colonial settlement, nowadays the city of Natal, Brazil.
- New Amsterdam Historic District, a section of Detroit, Michigan, U.S.
- Nieuw Amsterdam, Suriname, the capital of the Commewijne District, Suriname
- Nieuw-Amsterdam, Netherlands, a village in Emmen, Drenthe, Netherlands
- Buffalo, New York or New Amsterdam, New York, U.S.
- New York City, New York (state), formerly known as New Amsterdam
- Île Amsterdam or Nieuw Amsterdam, an island in the Indian Ocean

== Entertainment ==
- New Amsterdam (2008 TV series), a 2008 fantasy police procedural television series
- New Amsterdam (2018 TV series), a 2018 medical drama television series
- "New Amsterdam" (Mad Men), a first season episode of Mad Men
- New Amsterdam: Live at Heineken Music Hall February 4–6, 2003, an album by Counting Crows
- "New Amsterdam", a song by Elvis Costello from Get Happy!!
- "New Amsterdam", a song by Travis from The Boy With No Name
- "New Amsterdam", a song by Ilse DeLange from Gravel & Dust
- New Amsterdam, a 2007 novel by Elizabeth Bear
- New Amsterdam Records, a label for New York composers and performers
- New Amsterdam Theatre, a theater in New York City
- The New Amsterdams, an American rock band

== Ships ==
- Nieuw Amsterdam (sailing ship), a 17th century Dutch warship commanded by Anthony van Diemen
- SS Nieuw Amsterdam (1905), an ocean liner in service 1905–1932
- SS Nieuw Amsterdam (1937), an ocean liner in service 1938–1974
- MS Nieuw Amsterdam (1982), a cruise ship in service 1984–2000
- MS Nieuw Amsterdam (2009), a cruise ship that entered service in 2010

== Other uses ==
- New Amsterdam FC, a soccer team from Bronx, New York City
- New Amsterdam Spirits, an American brand of gin and vodka owned by E & J Gallo Winery

== See also ==
- Nieuw Amsterdam railway station
- Amsterdam Nieuw-West
