= Amsterdam (ship) =

Thirteen ships of the Dutch East India Company (Dutch: Vereenigde Oostindische Compagnie, commonly abbreviated to VOC) and its pre-companies have been named Amsterdam.

- Amsterdam (1594) was a 130-last (257 tonnes or 567 thousand pounds) galleon that was one of the four ships in the First Dutch Expedition to Nusantara (Dutch: Eerste Schipvaart, and with which both Cornelis and his brother Frederik de Houtman sailed). Amsterdam (1594) was set adrift and burnt on 11 January 1597. One of the other ships was the Duifje that (or a newer ship with the same name) in 1606 during a voyage of discovery would become the first European ship to encounter the Australian mainland.
- Amsterdam (1598) was a 250-last (494 tonnes or 1.1 million pounds) ship that was one of the eight ships in the Second Dutch Expedition to Nusantara (Dutch: Tweede Schipvaart), the first expedition led by Jacob Corneliszoon van Neck. Sailing on Hollandia (1594), one of the other ships in this expedition, was Willem Janszoon who would later captain the Duifje.
- Amsterdam (1600) was a 450-last (889 tonnes or 2.0 million pounds) ship that was one of the six ships in the second expedition led by Jacob Corneliszoon van Neck.
- Amsterdam (1603) was a 350-last (692 tonnes or 1.5 million pounds) ship that was one of the twelve ships in the VOC's first fleet that departed for the East Indies on 18 December 1603 under the command of Steven van der Hagen. One of the others was Duifje with Willem Janszoon as captain on their second journey to the East Indies. Between 28 June 1608 and 23 August 1608, Amsterdam was part of a fleet that fought the Portuguese at the Island of Mozambique in the Dutch–Portuguese War. Amsterdam was in service with the VOC until after 1606, possibly until after 1616.
- Amsterdam (1605) was a 350-last (692 tonnes or 1.5 million pounds) ship that was captured at Manila on 25 April 1610 by the Spanish.
- Amsterdam (1618) sighted Western Australia together with Dordrecht (1618) near today's Perth on 19 July 1619 under the command of Frederik de Houtman and Jacob Dedel at a latitude reported as 32°20’S—Coventry Reef is situated at 32°20′S 115°38′E near Warnbro Sound. On their northward journey to Bantam, Rottnest Island and Houtman Abrolhos were observed.
- Amsterdam (1623) was a 400-last (791 tonnes or 1.7 million pounds) ship also known as Wapen van Amsterdam (1623) that sailed in a fleet of ten ships to Batavia on 29 April 1623, returning in a fleet of four ships on 21 September 1626.
- Amsterdam (1632), from which the Western Australian coast around the latitude of Shark Bay was charted in 1635.
- Amsterdam (1691) was a sloop that perished near Bombay on 22 November 1702 en route to Basra.
- Amsterdam (1716) was a 400-last (791 tonnes or 1.7 million pounds) ship that sailed to the East Indies five times, returning the last time on 13 July 1731.
- Amsterdam (1740) was a 425-last (840 tonnes or 1.9 million pounds) ship that perished with all hands lost at the Shetland Islands in 1742 returning from Batavia.
- Amsterdam (1748) was a Dutch East Indiaman (Dutch: Spiegelretourschip, lit. 'Mirror Return Ship') that was wrecked in a storm on the English Channel on 26 January 1749 on its third attempt of its maiden voyage from Texel to Batavia. Its wreckage can be seen off Bulverhythe beach, Hastings, at very low tides.
- Amsterdam (1772) was a 575-last (1,136 tonnes or 2.5 million pounds) ship that sailed to the East Indies three times. On 17 May 1781 while at the Cape returning the third time, Amsterdam was sent to Mauritius to aid the French allied in the Fourth Anglo-Dutch War. The ship was laid up at the Cape early in 1784.
