= Erasmus House (Jakarta) =

Museum

Erasmus Huis (Jakarta)
- Established: 1970
- Location: Jalan HR Rasuna Said Kav. S-3, 12950 Jakarta
- Type: Arts centre
- Accreditation: Dutch Ministry of Foreign Affairs
- Director: Yolande Melsert
- Website: www.netherlandsandyou.nl/erasmushuis

The Erasmus Huis is the cultural center of the Netherlands in Jakarta.

== Building ==
The Erasmus Huis is a building neighboring the Dutch embassy with a library, exhibition hall and auditorium.

The current center was opened in 1981 and in 2018, the building was extensively renovated. The original Erasmus Huis was established in 1970.

== History ==
The Erasmus Huis was established in 1970. At first the center was located on the Jalan Menteng Raya 25, but soon a larger building became needed to accommodate all the activities. In 1981, the current center was opened, neighboring the Dutch embassy.

== Library ==
They have a collection of around 15,000 titles, newspapers and magazines. They offer a wide range of titles, including Dutch literature, Indonesian history, both Dutch and Indonesian art and culture, children’s books and some English and Indonesian books.
