= List of diplomatic missions of the Netherlands =

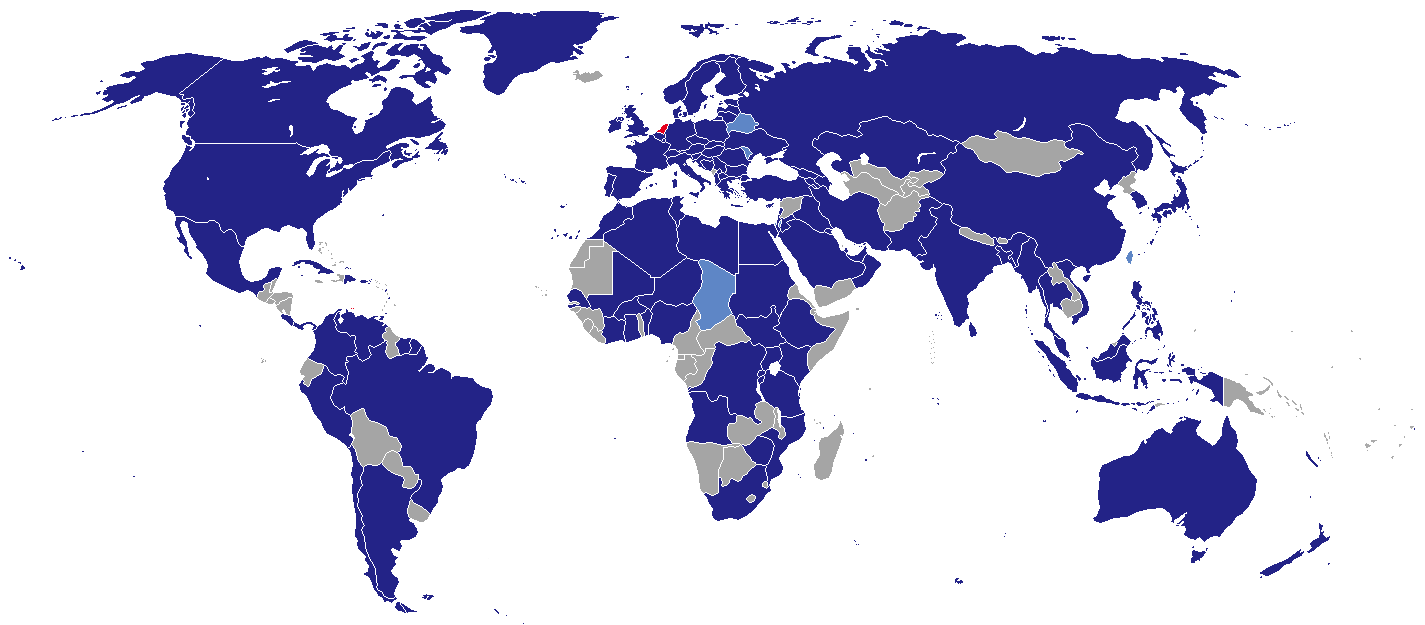
Countries with Dutch diplomatic missions.

This is a list of diplomatic missions of the Kingdom of the Netherlands, excluding honorary consulates. Ambassador of the Netherlands are officially known as His Majesty's Ambassador Extraordinary and Plenipotentiary, with their Diplomatic Mission called His Majesty's Embassy accordingly. Neither consuls nor consulates receive an official title.

== Current missions ==
=== Africa ===
Host country	Host city	Mission	Concurrent accreditation	Ref.
Algeria	Algiers	Embassy (Note: Also represents Luxembourg.)		
Angola	Luanda	Embassy	Countries: São Tomé and Príncipe	
Benin	Cotonou	Embassy	Countries: Cameroon; Gabon	
Burkina Faso	Ouagadougou	Embassy		
Burundi	Bujumbura	Embassy (Note: Slated for closure.)		
Chad	N'Djamena	Embassy office (Note: Subordinate to the Dutch embassy in Khartoum, Sudan.)		
Congo-Kinshasa	Kinshasa	Embassy	Countries: Congo-Brazzaville	
Congo-Kinshasa	Goma	Liaison office	Countries: Congo-Brazzaville	
Egypt	Cairo	Embassy		
Ethiopia	Addis Ababa	Embassy	Countries: Djibouti; International Organizations: African Union (Note: Accredited as an observer mission.); Intergovernmental Authority on Development; UNECA	
Ghana	Accra	Embassy	Countries: Liberia; Sierra Leone; Togo	
Ivory Coast	Abidjan	Embassy		
Kenya	Nairobi	Embassy	Countries: Eritrea; Seychelles; Somalia; International Organizations: United Nations; United Nations Environment Programme; United Nations Human Settlements Programme	
Libya	Tripoli	Embassy		
Mali	Bamako	Embassy		
Morocco	Rabat	Embassy		
Mozambique	Maputo	Embassy		
Niger	Niamey	Embassy		
Nigeria	Abuja	Embassy		
Nigeria	Lagos	Consulate-General		
Rwanda	Kigali	Embassy		
Senegal	Dakar	Embassy	Countries: Cape Verde; Gambia; Guinea; Guinea-Bissau; Mauritania	
South Africa	Pretoria	Embassy	Countries: Botswana; Eswatini; Lesotho; Namibia	
South Africa	Cape Town	Consulate-General	Countries: Botswana; Eswatini; Lesotho; Namibia	
South Sudan	Juba	Embassy		
Tanzania	Dar Es Salaam	Embassy	Countries: Comoros; Madagascar; Seychelles	
Tunisia	Tunis	Embassy		
Uganda	Kampala	Embassy		
Zimbabwe	Harare	Embassy	Countries: Malawi; Zambia	

=== Americas ===
Host country	Host city	Mission	Concurrent accreditation	Ref.
Argentina	Buenos Aires	Embassy	Countries: Paraguay; Uruguay	
Brazil	Brasília	Embassy		
Brazil	Rio de Janeiro	Consulate-General		
Brazil	São Paulo	Consulate-General		
Canada	Ottawa	Embassy		
Canada	Toronto	Consulate-General		
Canada	Vancouver	Consulate-General		
Chile	Santiago de Chile	Embassy		
Colombia	Bogotá	Embassy		
Costa Rica	San José	Embassy	Countries: El Salvador; Guatemala; Honduras	
Cuba	Havana	Embassy	Countries: Jamaica	
Dominican Republic	Santo Domingo	Embassy	Countries: Haiti	
Mexico	Mexico City	Embassy	Countries: Belize	
Panama	Panama City	Embassy		
Peru	Lima	Embassy	Countries: Bolivia; Ecuador	
Suriname	Paramaribo	Embassy	Countries: Guyana	
Trinidad and Tobago	Port of Spain	Embassy	Countries: Antigua and Barbuda; Barbados; Dominica; Saint Kitts and Nevis; Saint Lucia; Saint Vincent and the Grenadines	
United States	Washington, D.C.	Embassy	International Organizations: Organization of American States	
United States	Atlanta	Consulate-General	International Organizations: Organization of American States	
United States	Chicago	Consulate-General	International Organizations: Organization of American States	
United States	Miami	Consulate-General	International Organizations: Organization of American States	
United States	New York City	Consulate-General	International Organizations: Organization of American States	
United States	San Francisco	Consulate-General	International Organizations: Organization of American States	
Venezuela	Caracas	Embassy		

=== Asia ===
Host country	Host city	Mission	Concurrent accreditation	Ref.
Armenia	Yerevan	Embassy		
Azerbaijan	Baku	Embassy		
Bangladesh	Dhaka	Embassy		
China	Beijing	Embassy	Countries: Mongolia	
China	Guangzhou	Consulate-General	Countries: Mongolia	
China	Hong Kong	Consulate-General	Countries: Mongolia	
China	Shanghai	Consulate-General	Countries: Mongolia	
Georgia	Tbilisi	Embassy		
India	New Delhi	Embassy	Countries: Bhutan; Nepal	
India	Bengaluru	Consulate-General	Countries: Bhutan; Nepal	
India	Mumbai	Consulate-General	Countries: Bhutan; Nepal	
Indonesia	Jakarta	Embassy	Countries: Timor-Leste; International Organizations: Association of Southeast Asian Nations	
Iran	Tehran	Embassy		
Iraq	Baghdad	Embassy		
Iraq	Erbil	Consulate-General		
Israel	Tel Aviv	Embassy		
Japan	Tokyo	Embassy		
Japan	Osaka	Consulate-General		
Jordan	Amman	Embassy		
Kazakhstan	Astana	Embassy	Countries: Kyrgyzstan; Tajikistan; Turkmenistan; Uzbekistan	
Kuwait	Kuwait City	Embassy	Countries: Bahrain	
Lebanon	Beirut	Embassy		
Malaysia	Kuala Lumpur	Embassy		
Myanmar	Yangon	Embassy		
Oman	Muscat	Embassy		
Pakistan	Islamabad	Embassy		
Palestine	Ramallah	Representative office		
Philippines	Manila	Embassy	Countries: Marshall Islands; Micronesia; Palau	
Qatar	Doha	Embassy		
Republic of China (Taiwan)	Taipei	Office		
Saudi Arabia	Riyadh	Embassy		
Singapore	Singapore	Embassy	Countries: Brunei	
South Korea	Seoul	Embassy	Countries: North Korea	
Sri Lanka	Colombo	Embassy	Countries: Maldives	
Thailand	Bangkok	Embassy	Countries: Cambodia; Laos	
Turkey	Ankara	Embassy		
Turkey	Istanbul	Consulate-General		
United Arab Emirates	Abu Dhabi	Embassy		
United Arab Emirates	Dubai	Consulate-General		
Vietnam	Hanoi	Embassy		
Vietnam	Ho Chi Minh City	Consulate-General		

=== Europe ===
Host country	Host city	Mission	Concurrent accreditation	Ref.
Albania	Tirana	Embassy		
Austria	Vienna	Embassy		
Belarus	Minsk	Embassy office (Note: Subordinate to the Dutch embassy in Warsaw, Poland.)		
Belgium	Brussels	Embassy		
Belgium	Antwerp	Consulate-General		
Bosnia and Herzegovina	Sarajevo	Embassy		
Bulgaria	Sofia	Embassy		
Croatia	Zagreb	Embassy		
Cyprus	Nicosia	Embassy		
Czechia	Prague	Embassy		
Denmark	Copenhagen	Embassy		
Estonia	Tallinn	Embassy		
Finland	Helsinki	Embassy		
France	Paris	Embassy	Countries: Andorra; Monaco	
Germany	Berlin	Embassy		
Germany	Düsseldorf	Consulate-General		
Germany	Munich	Consulate-General		
Greece	Athens	Embassy		
Holy See (Note: The Dutch Embassy to the Holy See is located outside Vatican territory in Rome.)	Rome	Embassy		
Hungary	Budapest	Embassy		
Ireland	Dublin	Embassy		
Italy	Rome	Embassy	Countries: San Marino	
Italy	Milan	Consulate-General	Countries: San Marino	
Kosovo	Pristina	Embassy		
Latvia	Riga	Embassy		
Lithuania	Vilnius	Embassy		
Luxembourg	Luxembourg City	Embassy		
Malta	Valletta	Embassy		
Moldova	Chișinău	Embassy		
North Macedonia	Skopje	Embassy		
Norway	Oslo	Embassy	Countries: Iceland	
Poland	Warsaw	Embassy	Countries: Belarus	
Portugal	Lisbon	Embassy		
Romania	Bucharest	Embassy		
Russia	Moscow	Embassy		
Russia	Saint Petersburg	Consulate-General		
Serbia	Belgrade	Embassy	Countries: Montenegro	
Slovakia	Bratislava	Embassy		
Slovenia	Ljubljana	Embassy		
Spain	Madrid	Embassy		
Sweden	Stockholm	Embassy		
Switzerland	Bern	Embassy	Countries: Liechtenstein	
Ukraine	Kyiv	Embassy		
United Kingdom	London	Embassy		

=== Oceania ===
Host country	Host city	Mission	Concurrent accreditation	Ref.
Australia	Canberra	Embassy	Countries: Nauru; Papua New Guinea; Solomon Islands; Vanuatu	
Australia	Sydney	Consulate-General	Countries: Nauru; Papua New Guinea; Solomon Islands; Vanuatu	
New Zealand	Wellington	Embassy	Countries: Fiji; Samoa; Tonga	

=== Multilateral organizations ===
Organization	Host city	Host country	Mission	Concurrent accreditation	Ref.
Council of Europe	Strasbourg	France	Permanent Representation		
European Union	Brussels	Belgium	Permanent Representation		
FAO	Rome	Italy	Permanent Mission	International Organizations: International Fund for Agricultural Development; World Food Programme	
NATO	Brussels	Belgium	Permanent Representation		
OECD	Paris	France	Permanent Representation		
OPCW	The Hague	Netherlands	Permanent Representation		
OSCE	Vienna	Austria	Delegation		
United Nations	New York City	United States	Permanent Mission		
United Nations	Geneva	Switzerland	Permanent Mission	International Organizations: Conference on Disarmament; International Labour Organization; UNCTAD; UNECE; World Economic Forum; World Health Organization; World Intellectual Property Organization; World Trade Organization	
United Nations	Vienna	Austria	Permanent Mission	International Organizations: International Atomic Energy Agency; UNIDO; UNODC	
UNESCO	Paris	France	Permanent Representation		

== Gallery ==
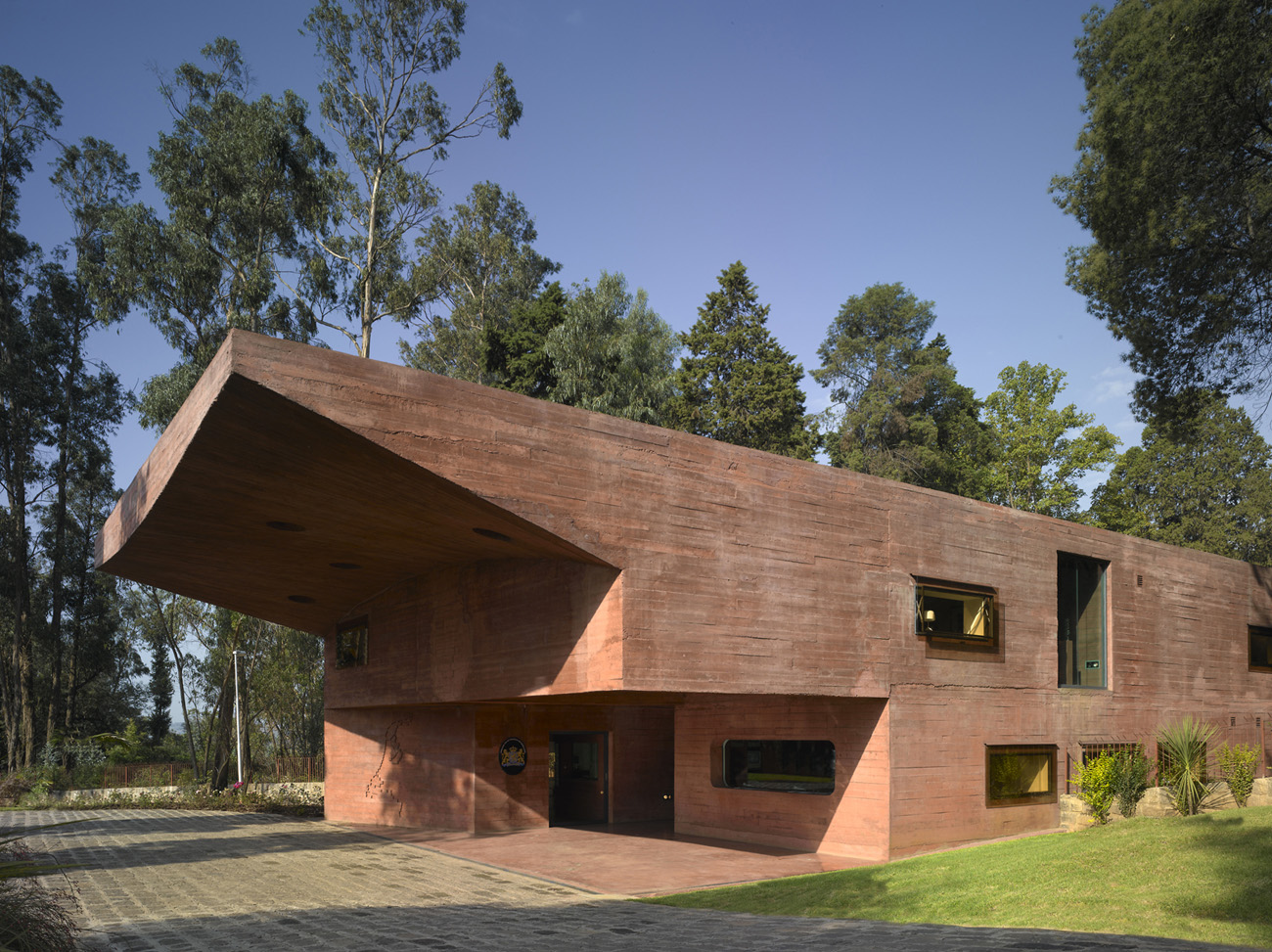
Embassy in Addis Ababa

Building hosting the Embassy in Athens

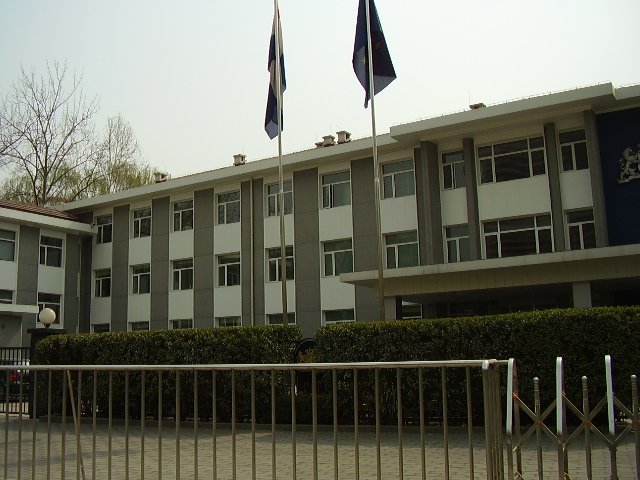
Embassy in Beijing

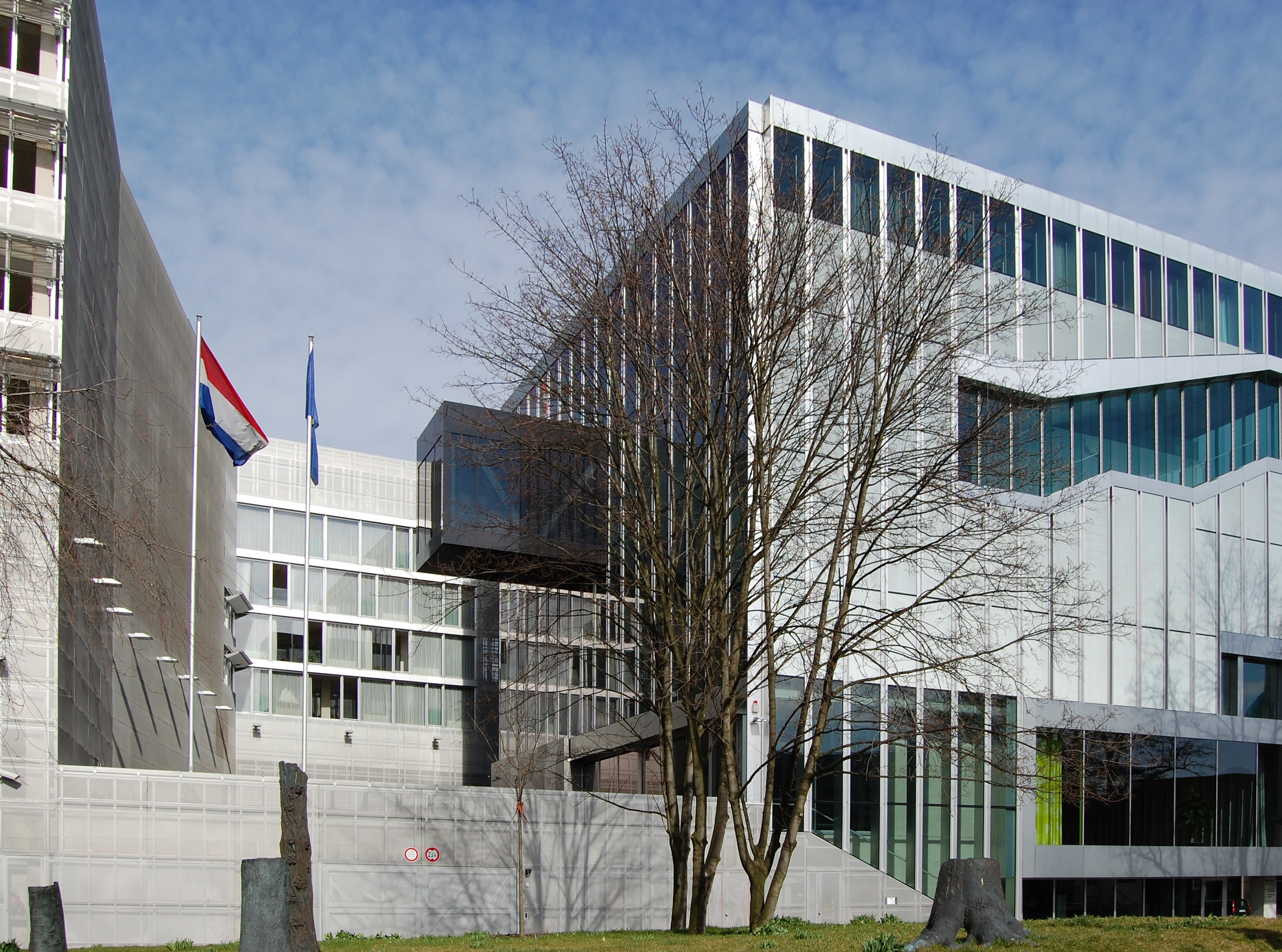
Embassy in Berlin

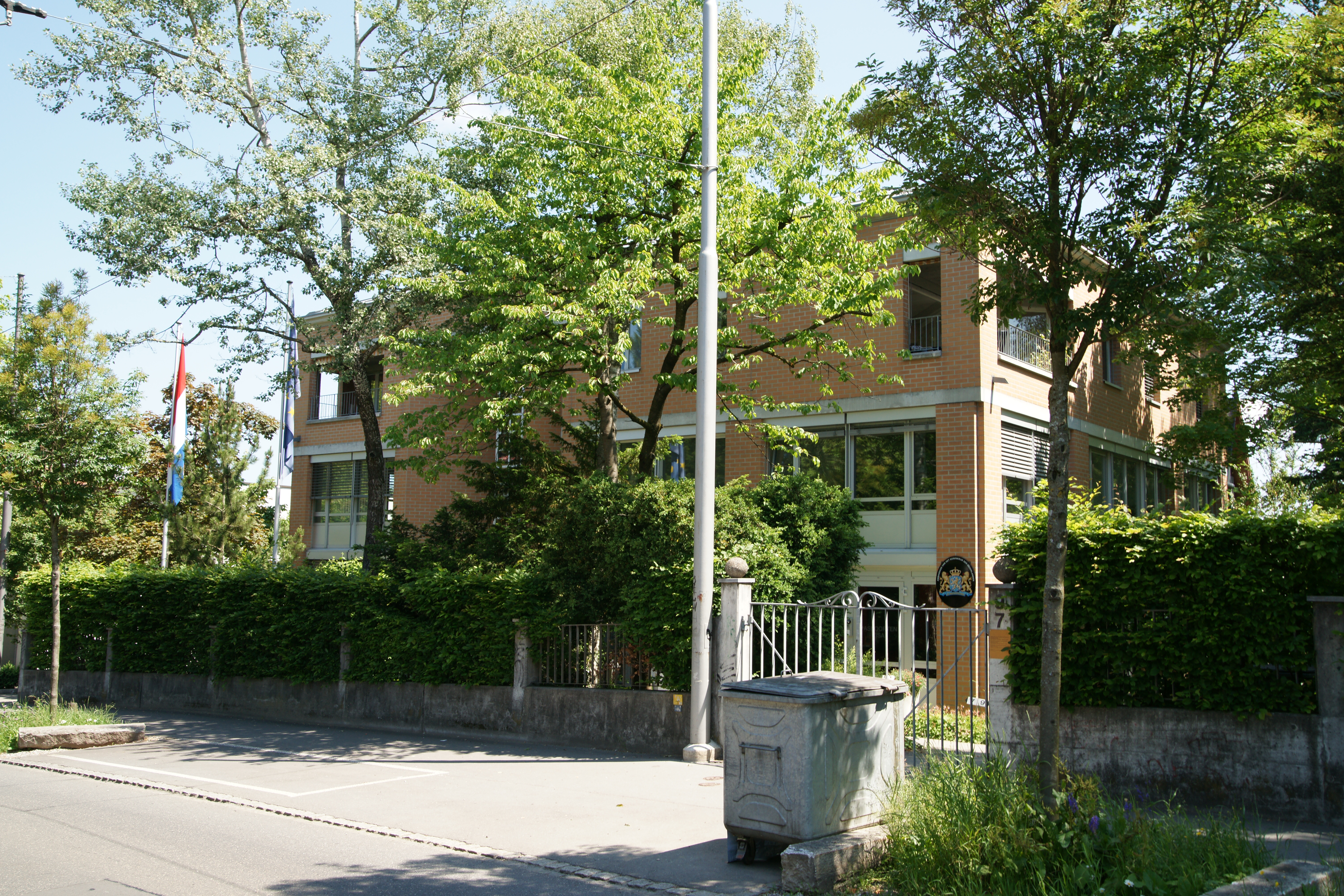
Embassy in Bern

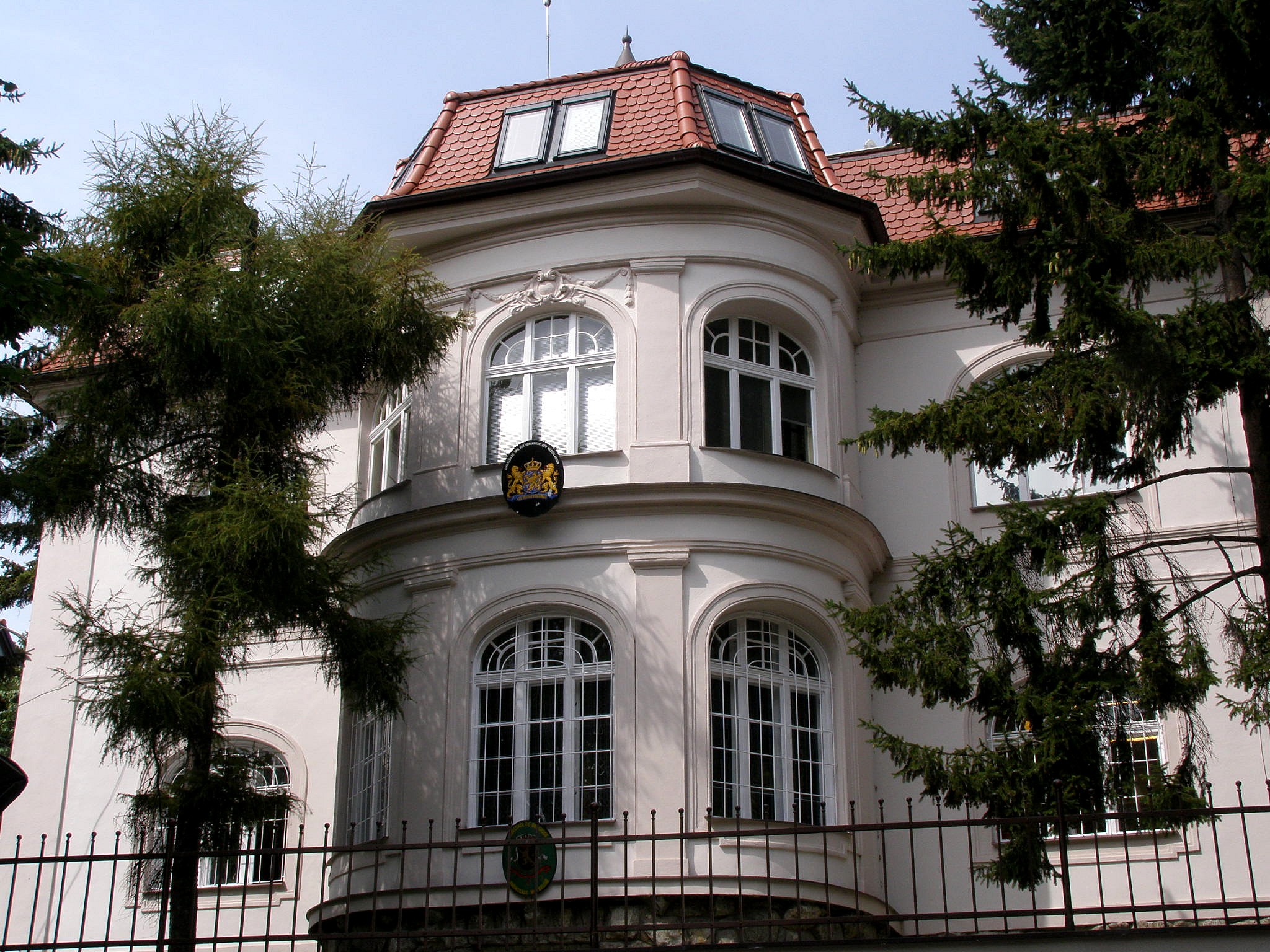
Embassy in Bratislava

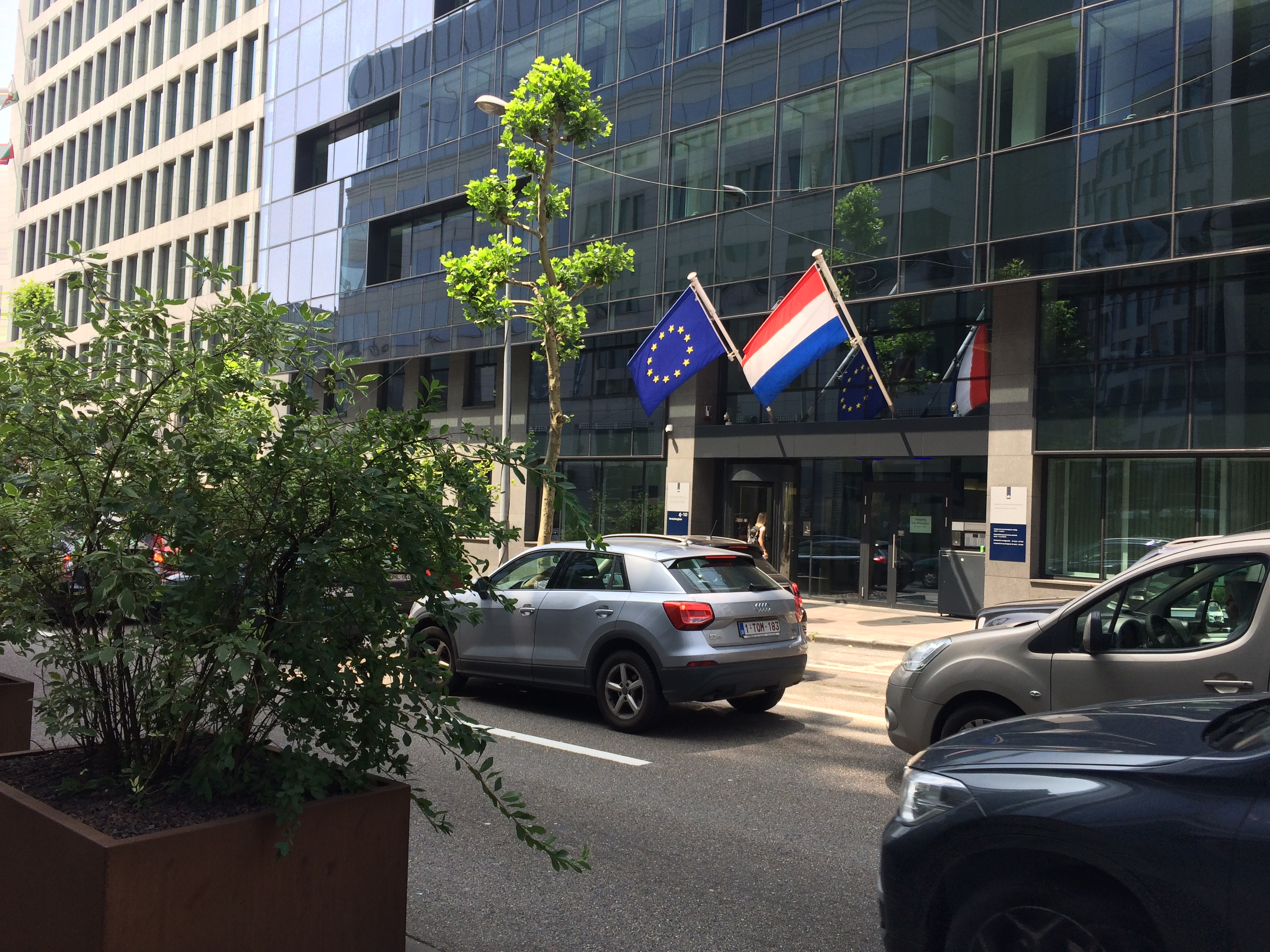
Embassy in Brussels

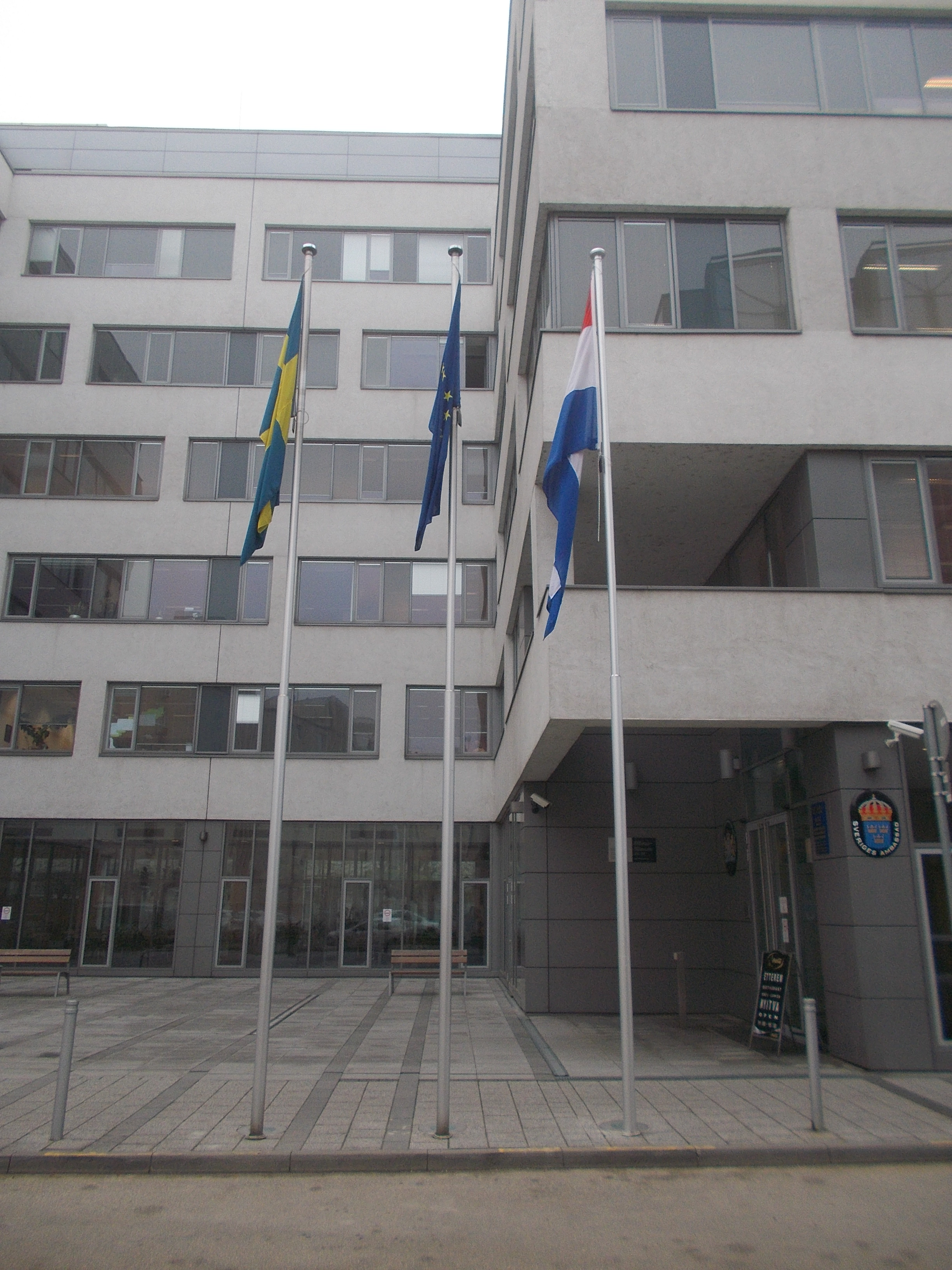
Embassy in Budapest

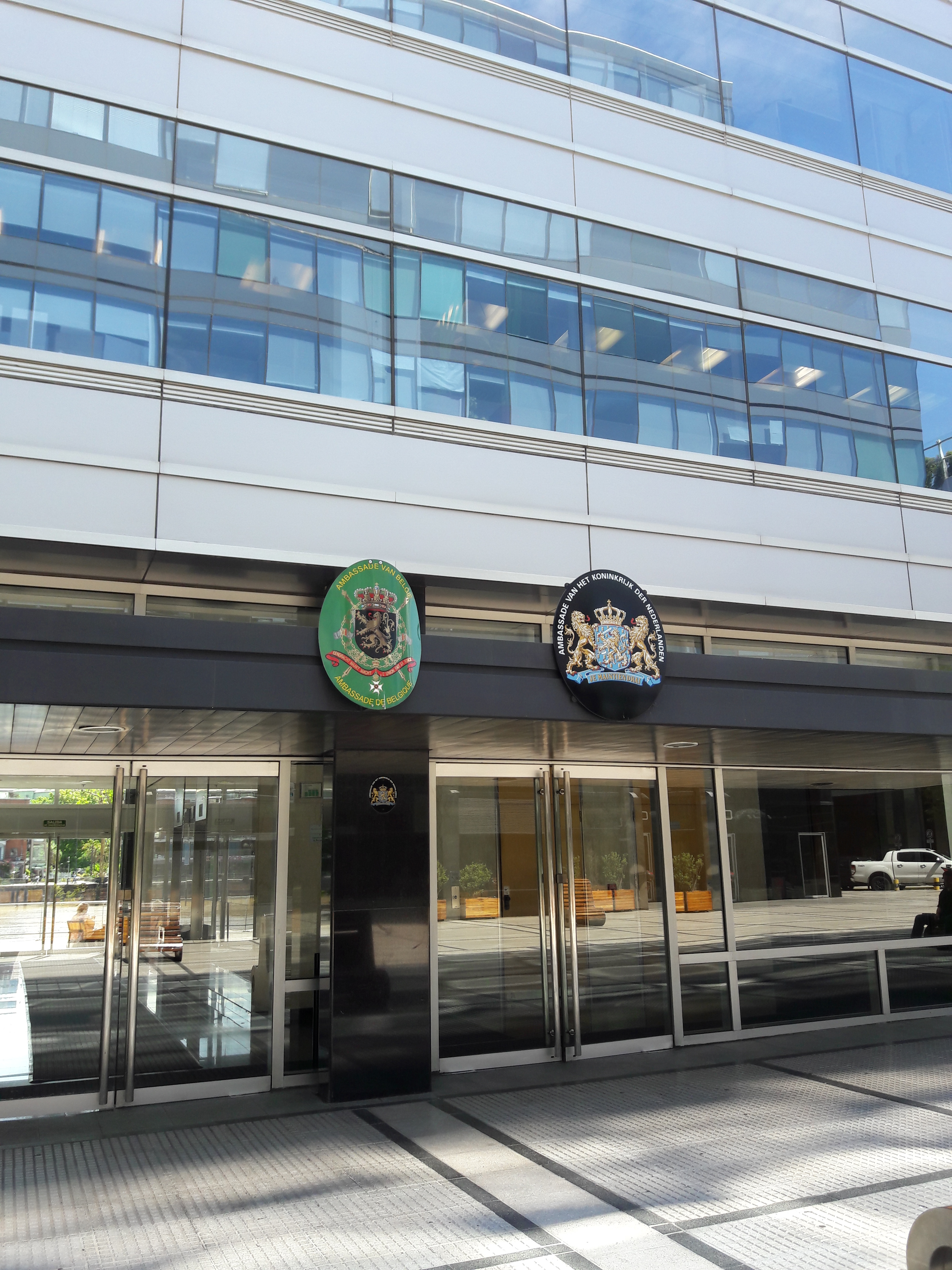
Embassy in Buenos Aires

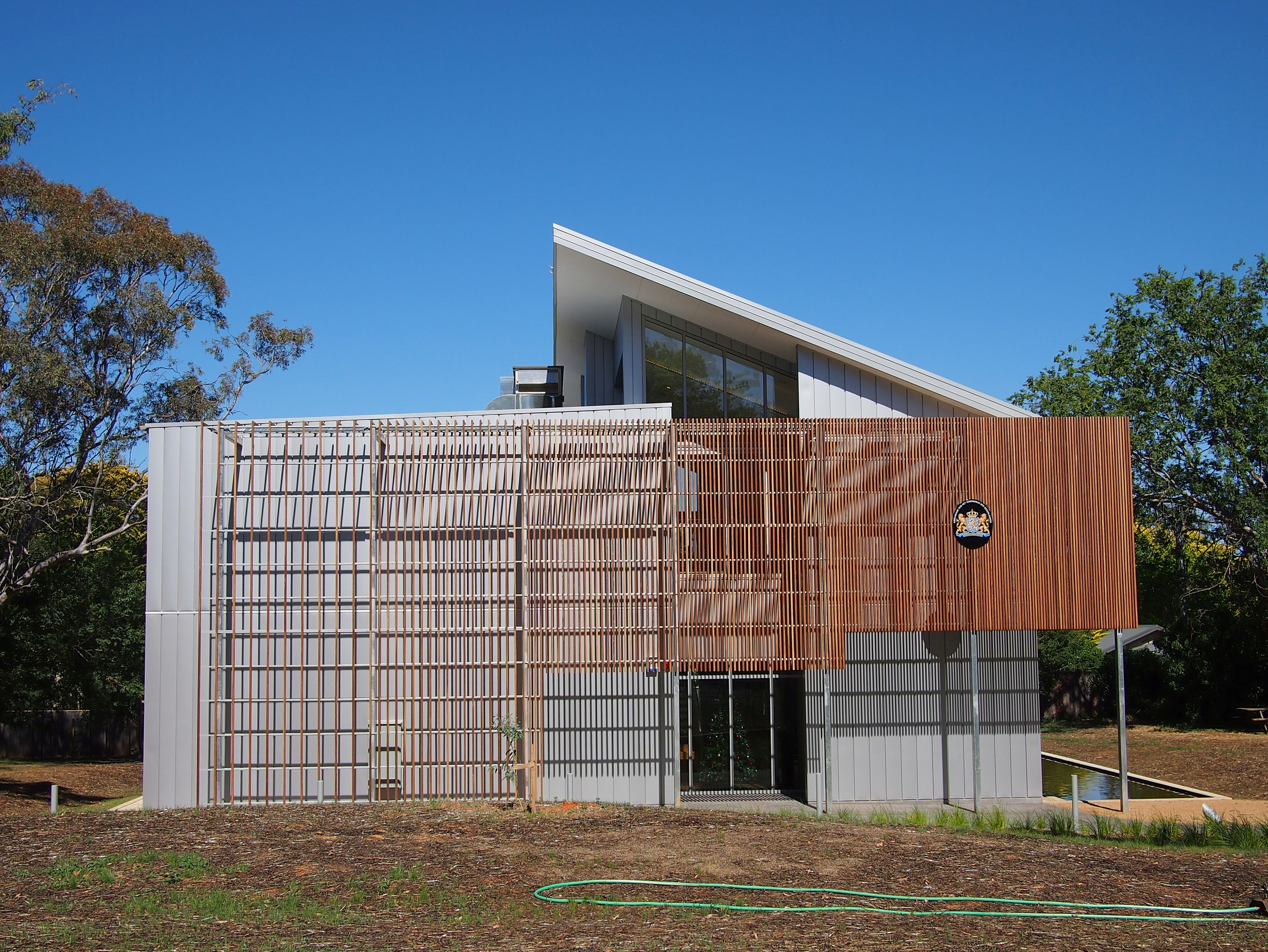
Embassy in Canberra

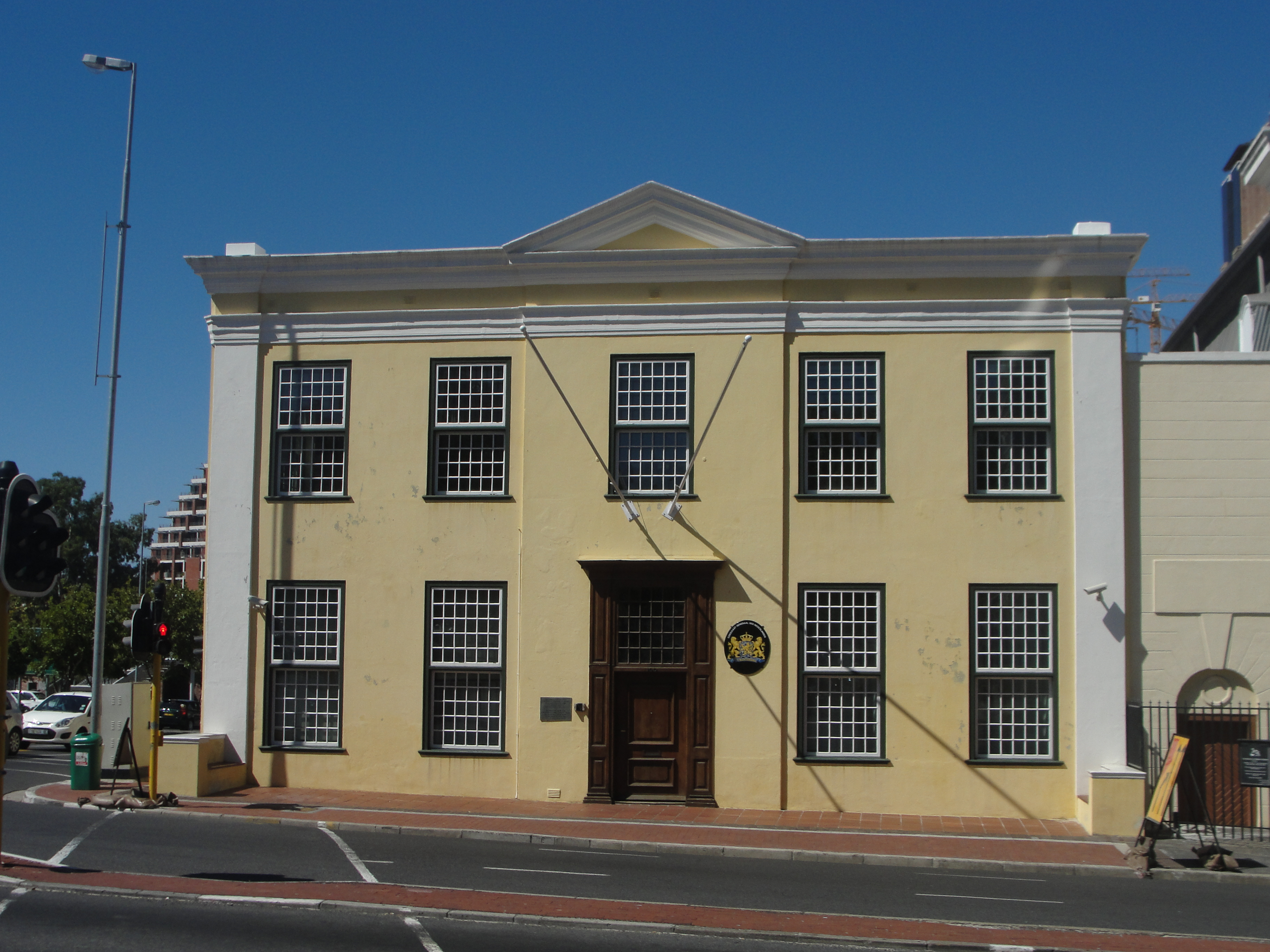
Consulate-General in Cape Town

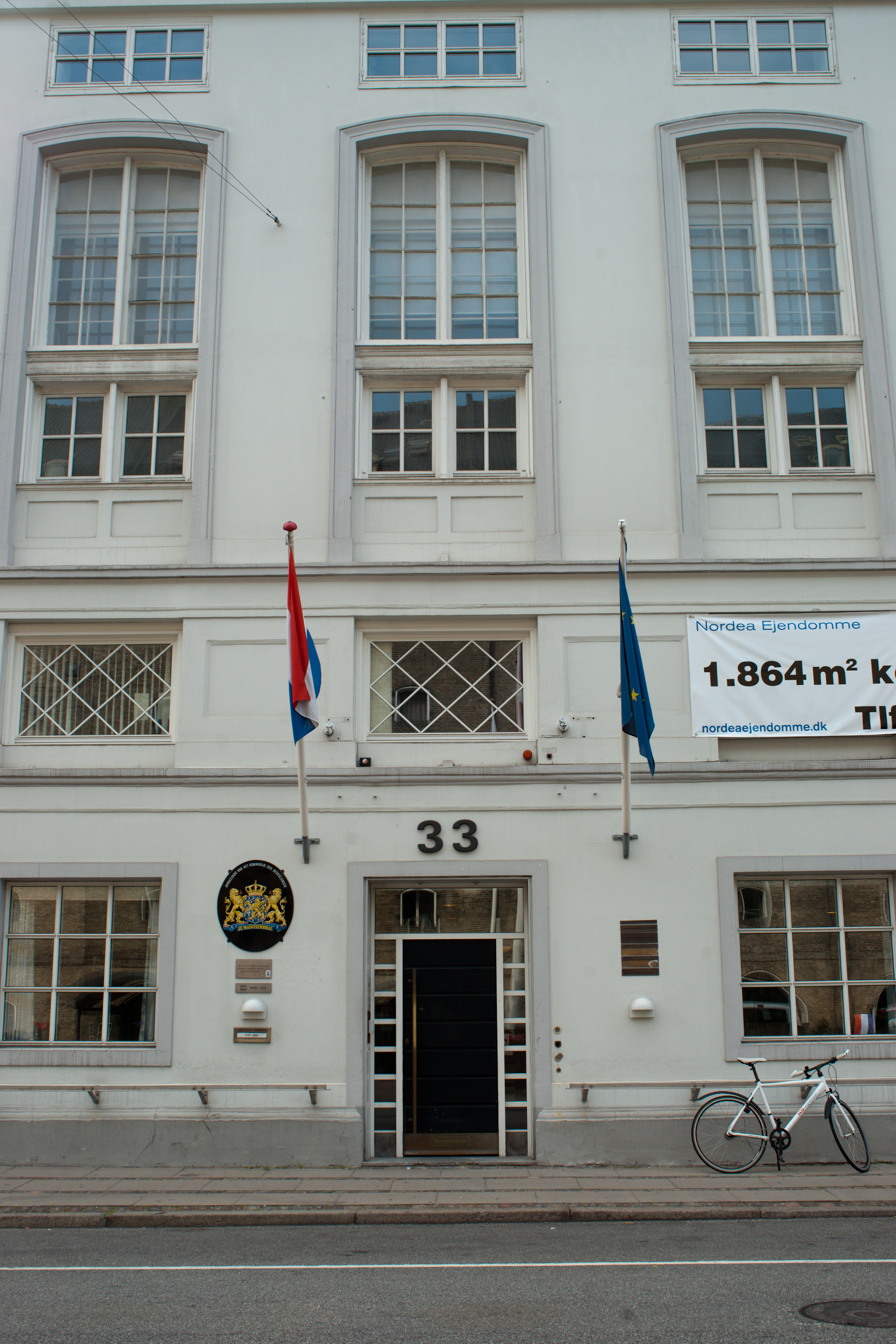
Embassy in Copenhagen

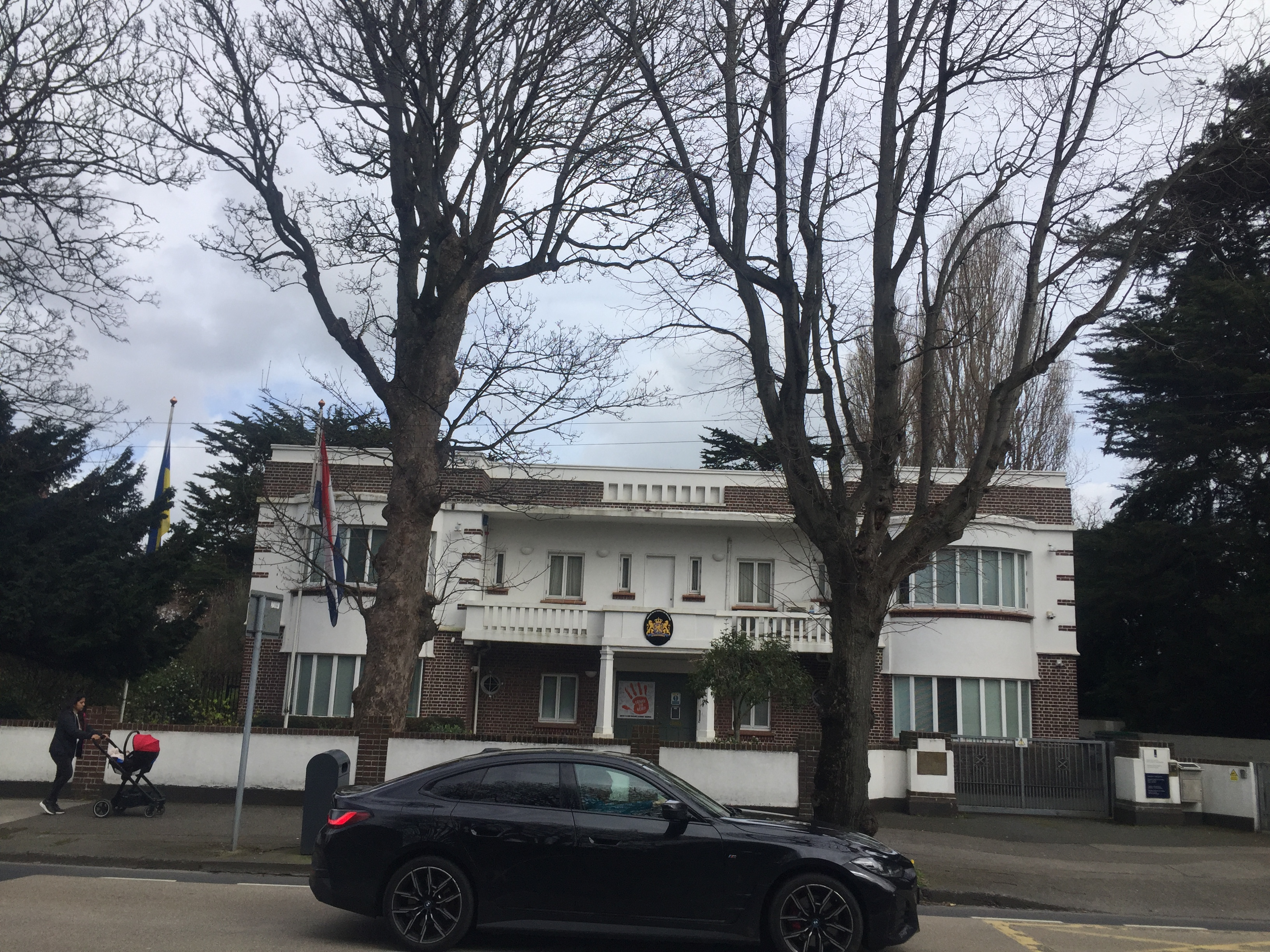
Embassy in Dublin

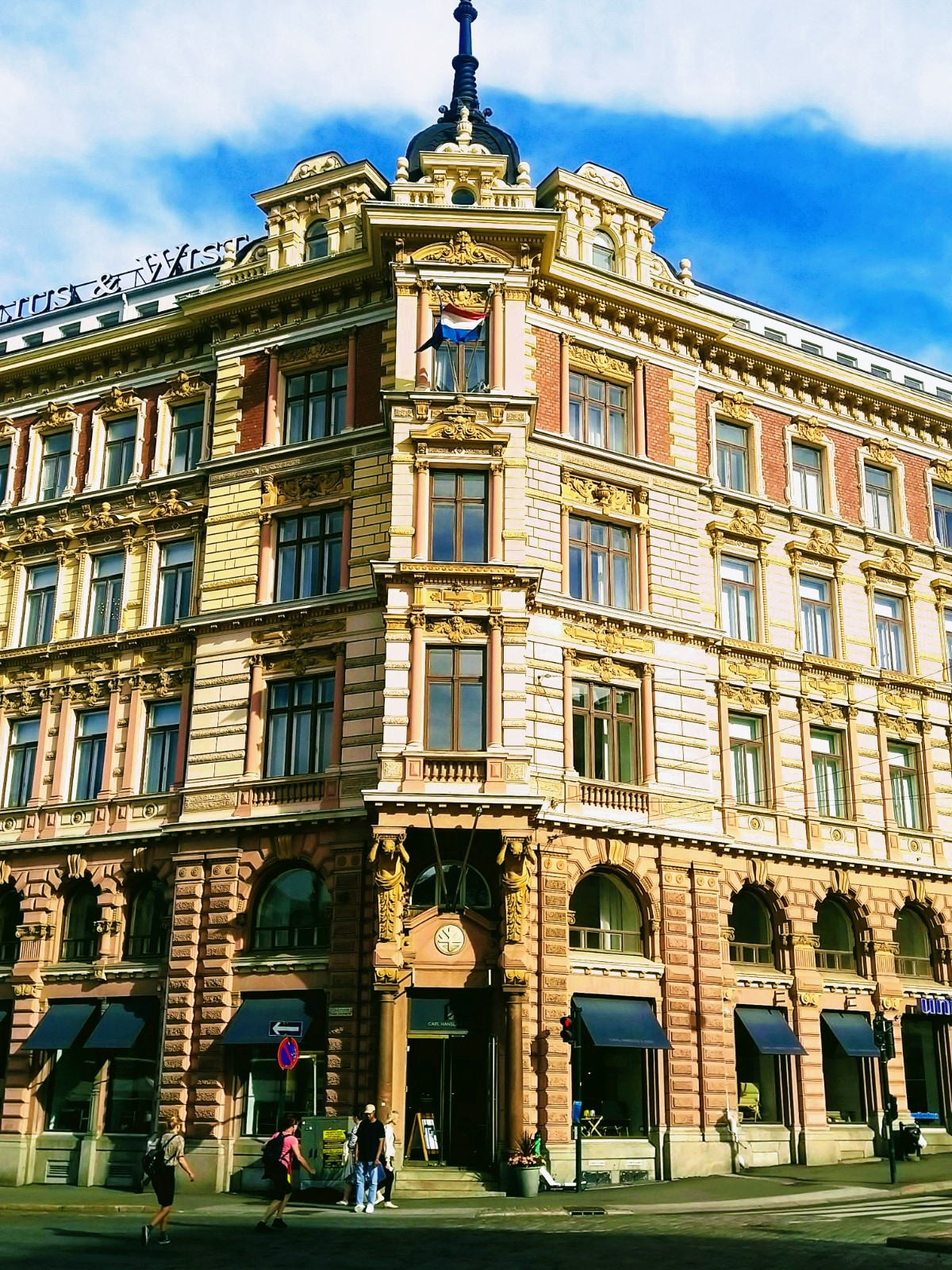
Building hosting the Embassy in Helsinki

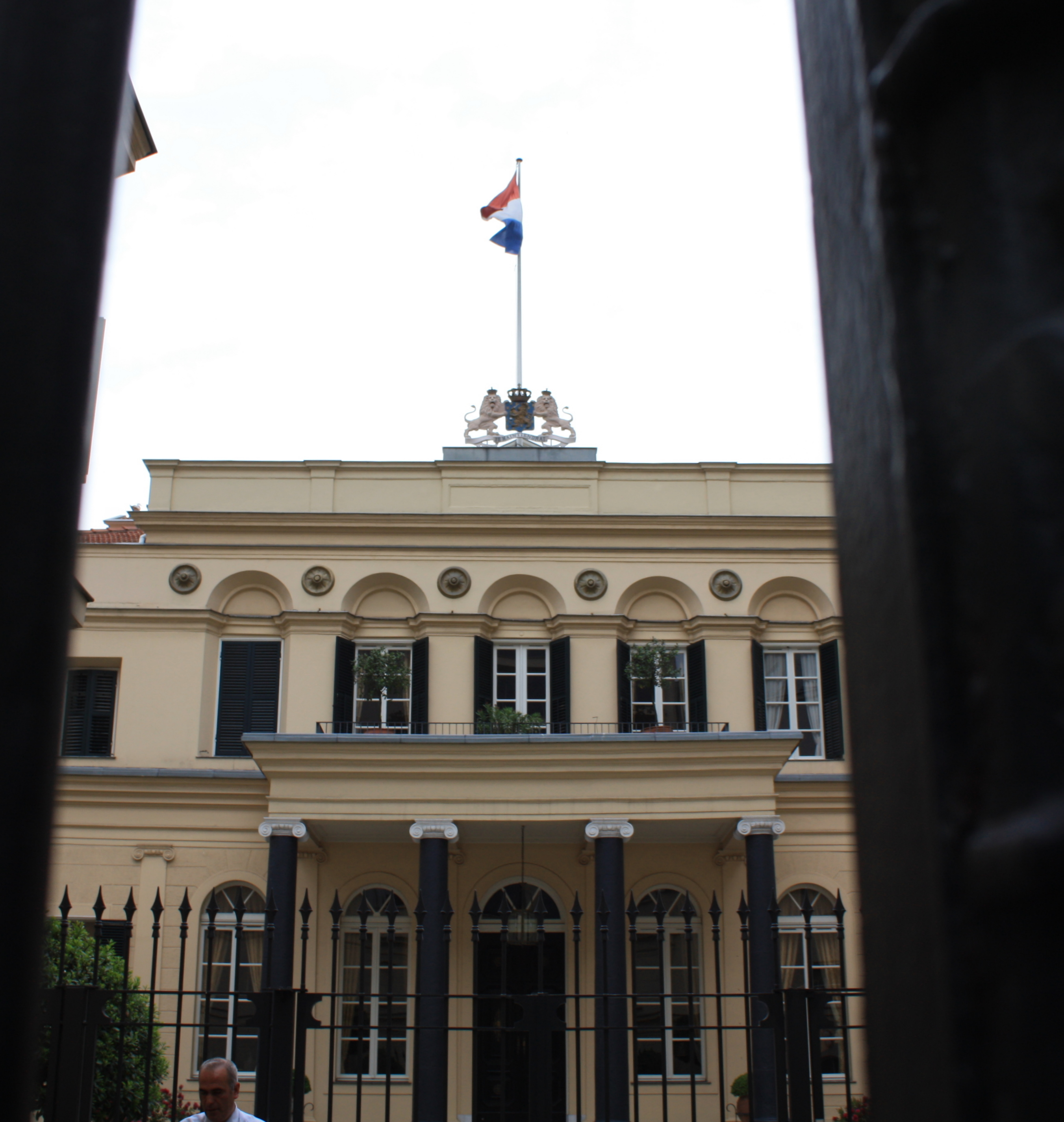
Consulate-General in Istanbul

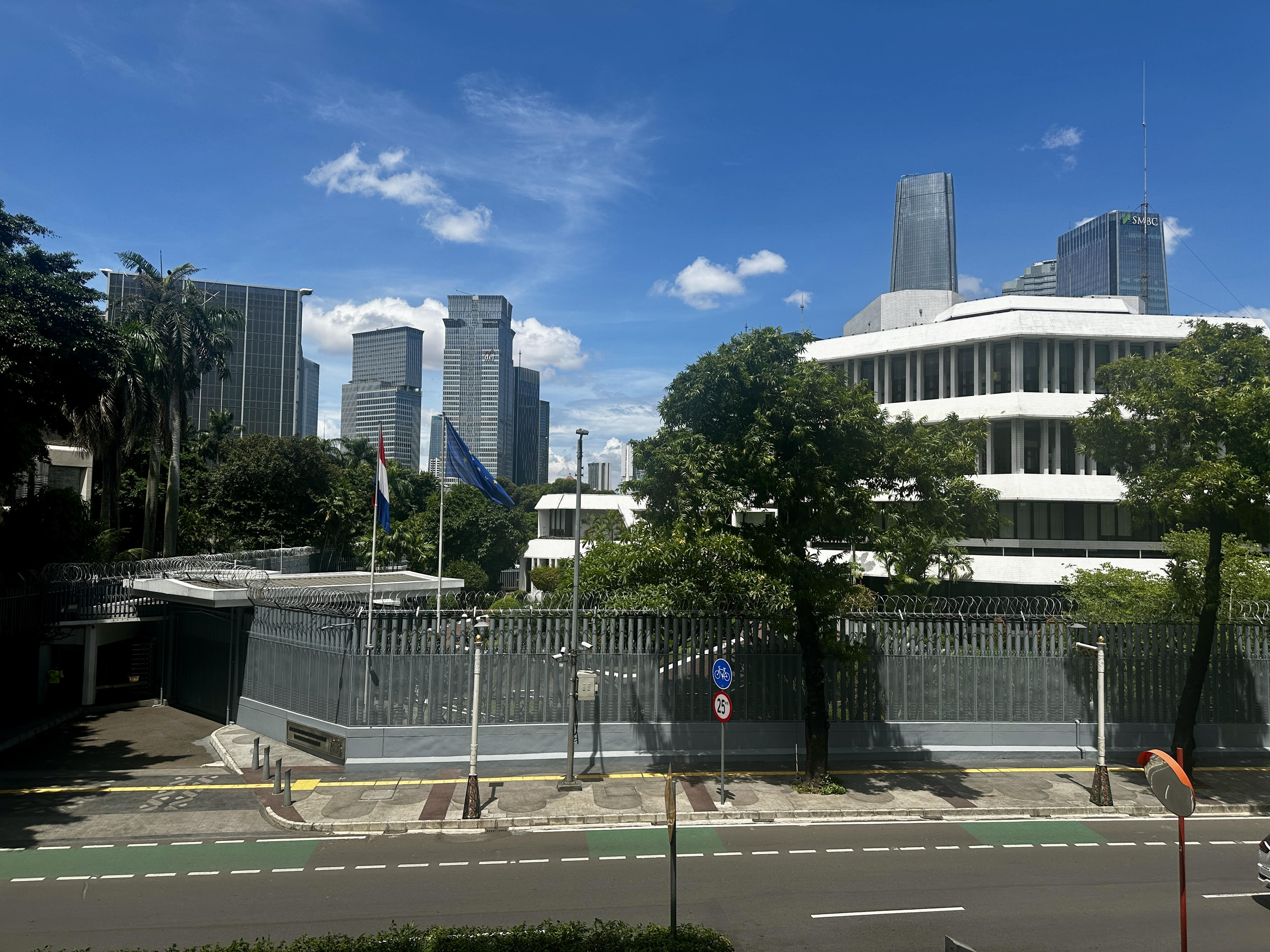
Embassy in Jakarta

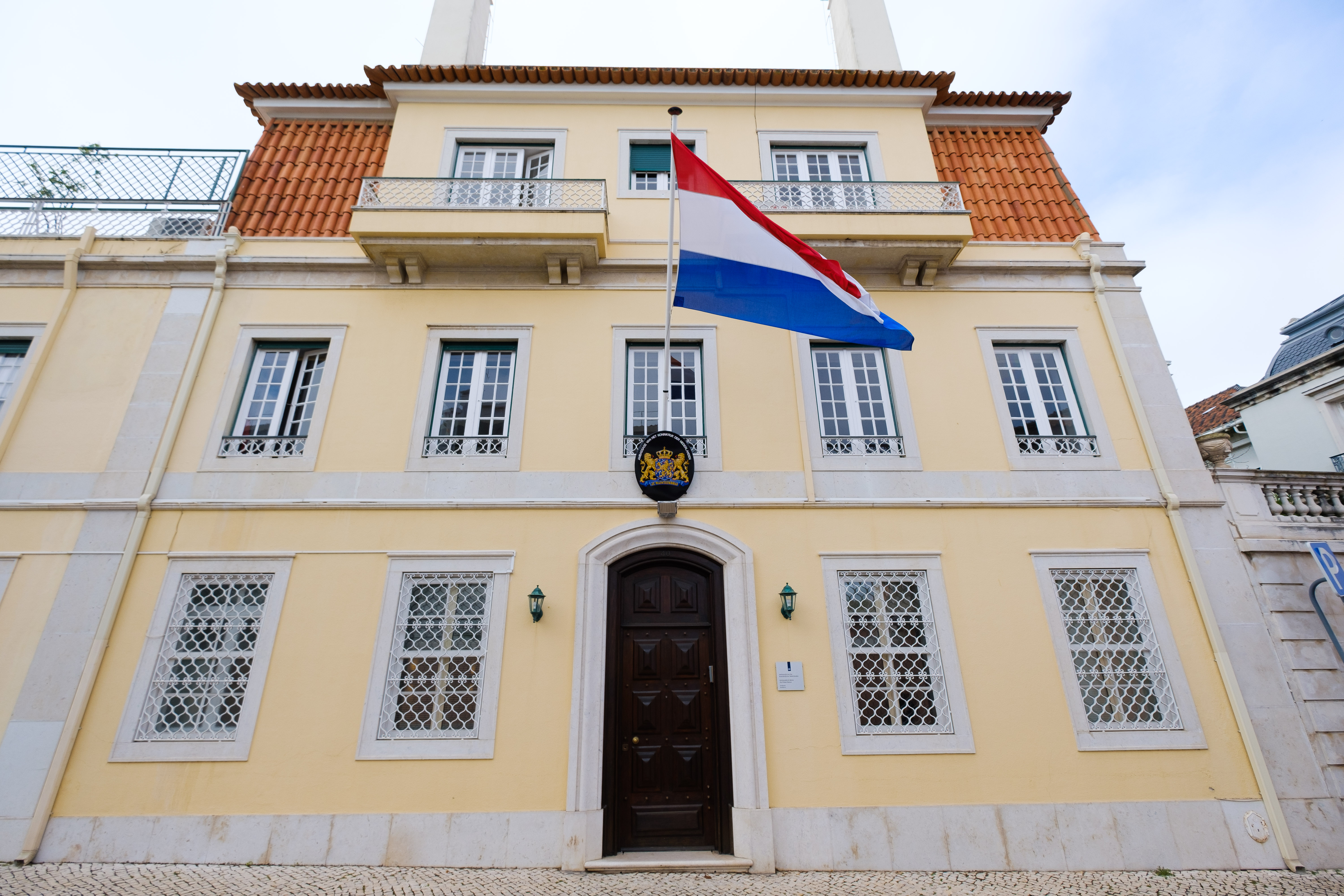
Embassy in Lisbon

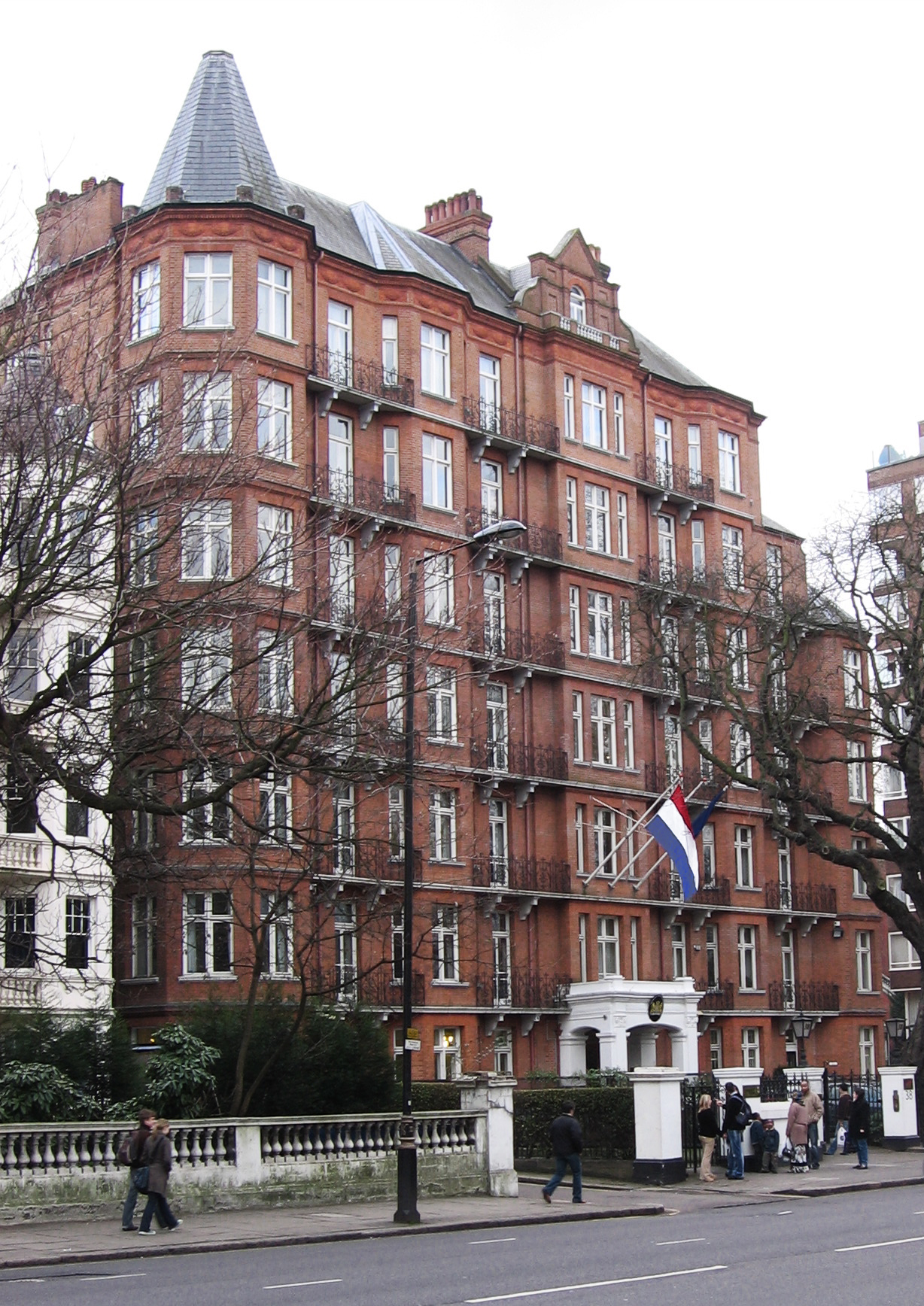
Embassy in London

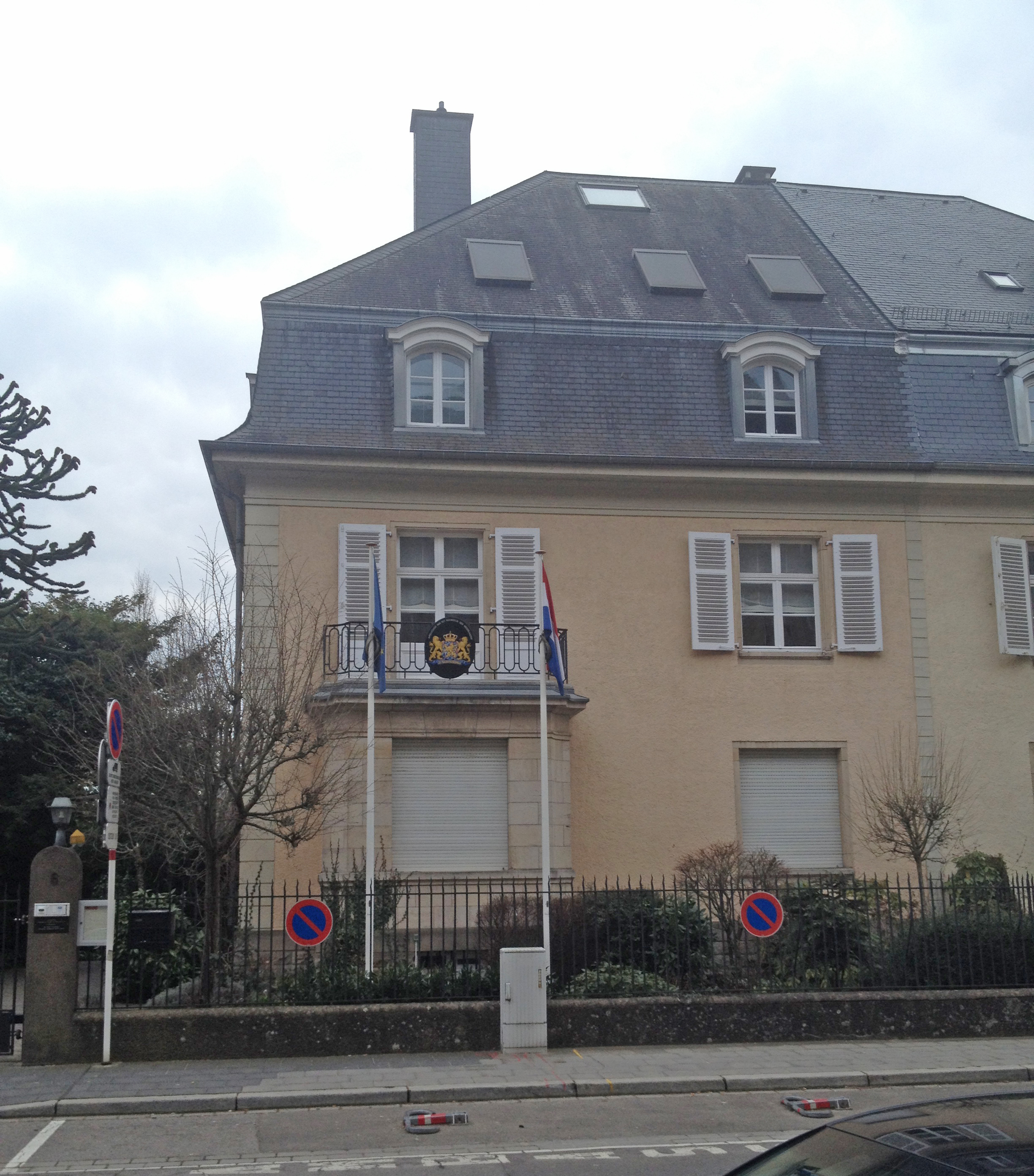
Embassy in Luxembourg

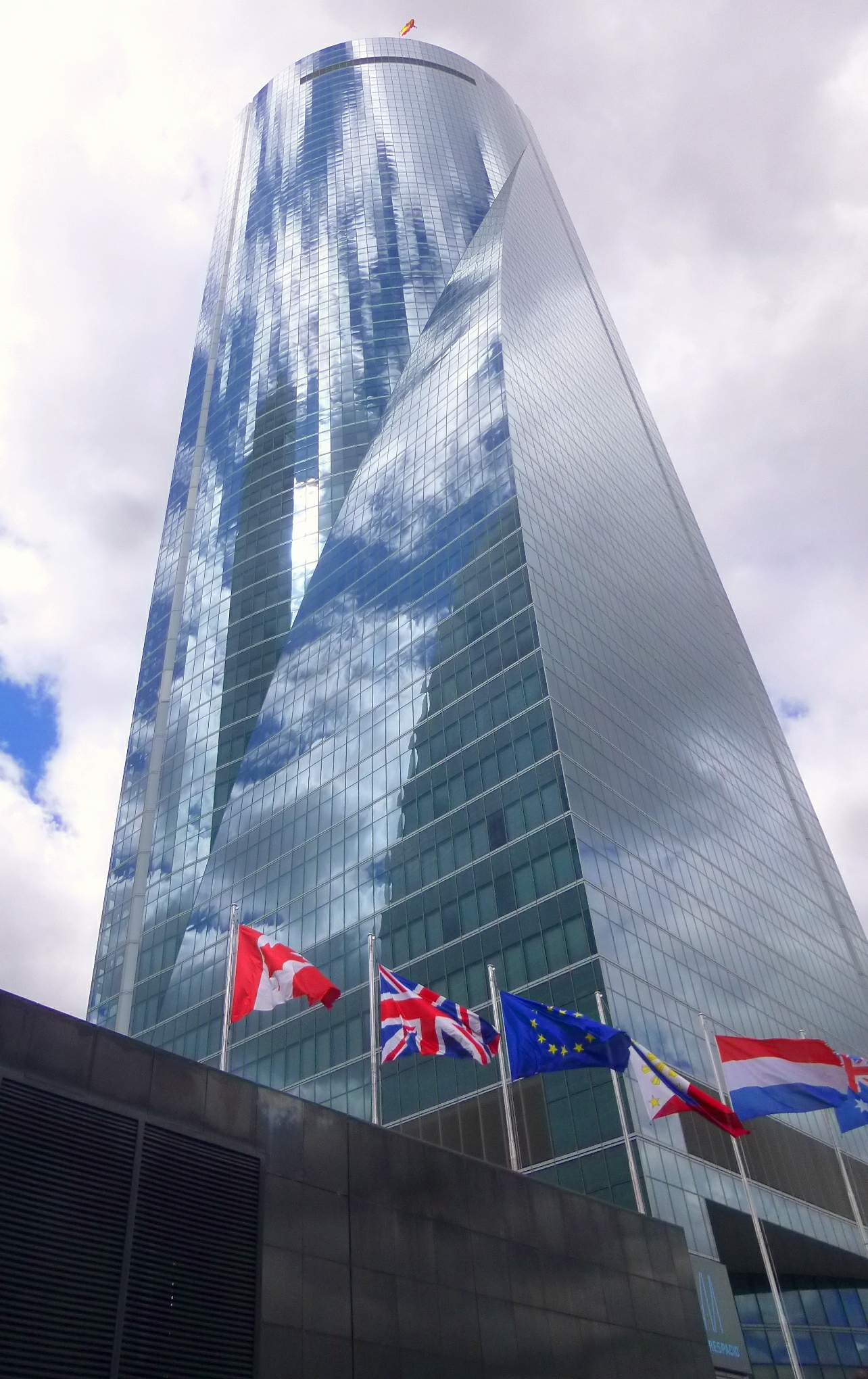
Building hosting the Embassy in Madrid

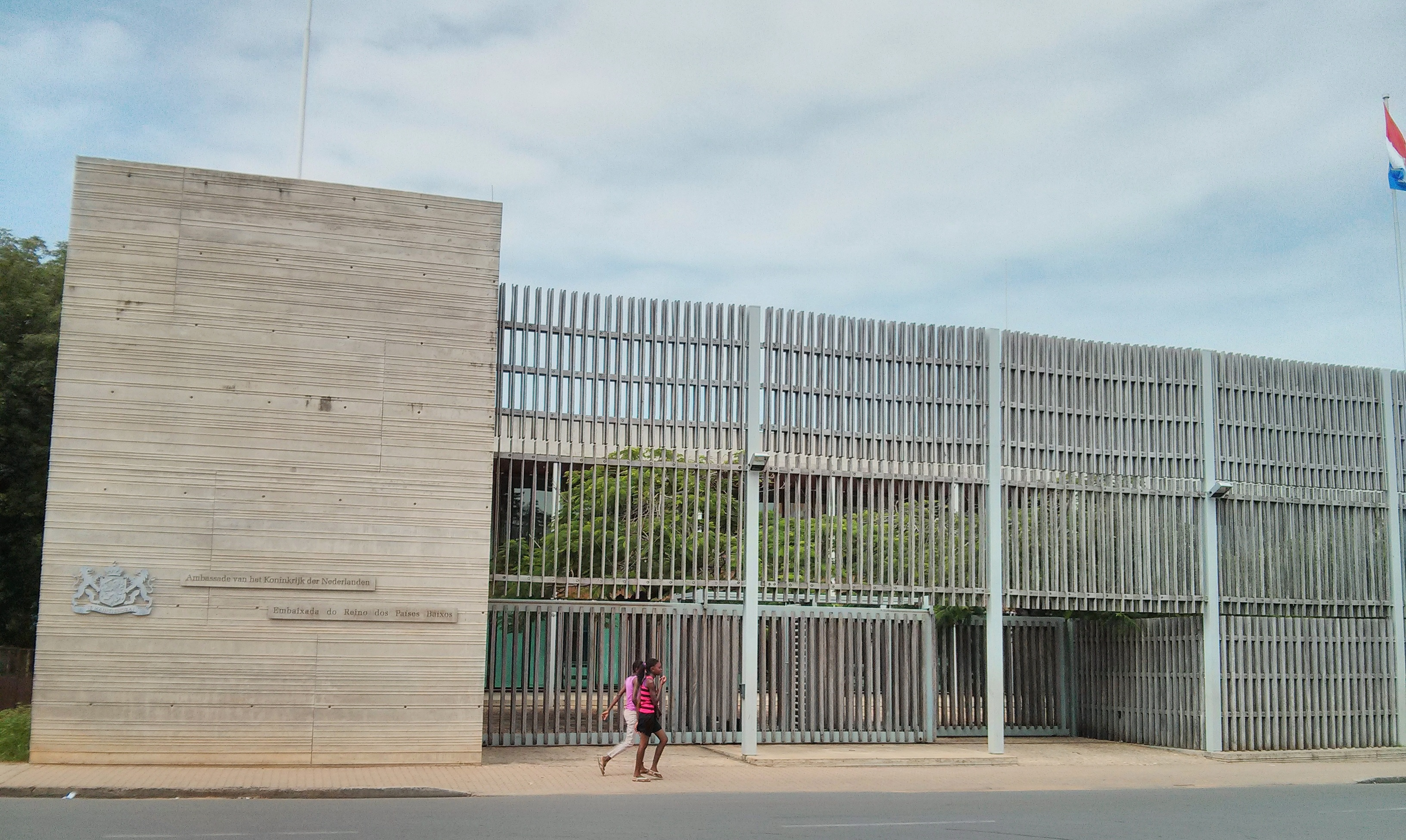
Embassy in Maputo

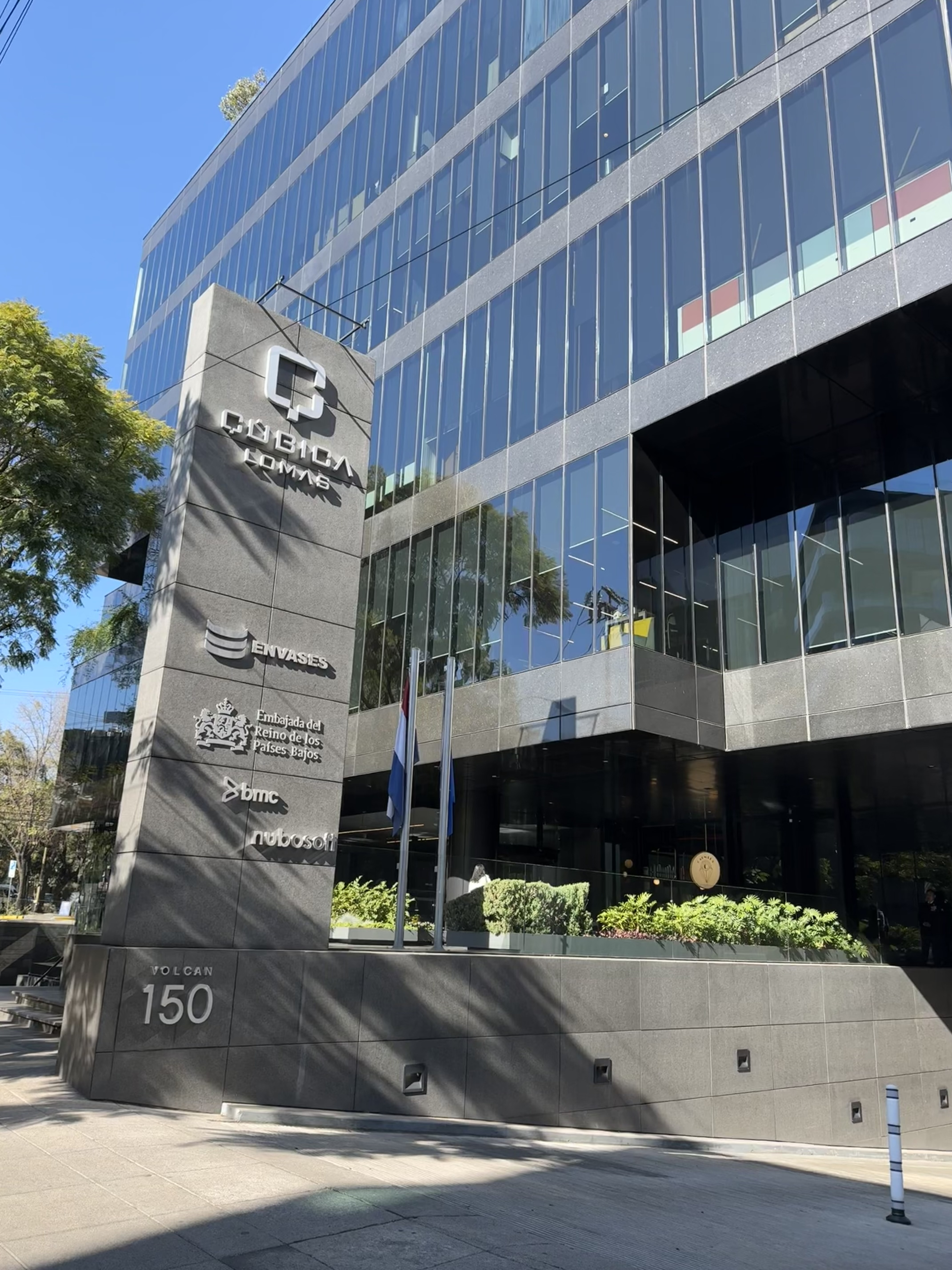
Embassy in Mexico City

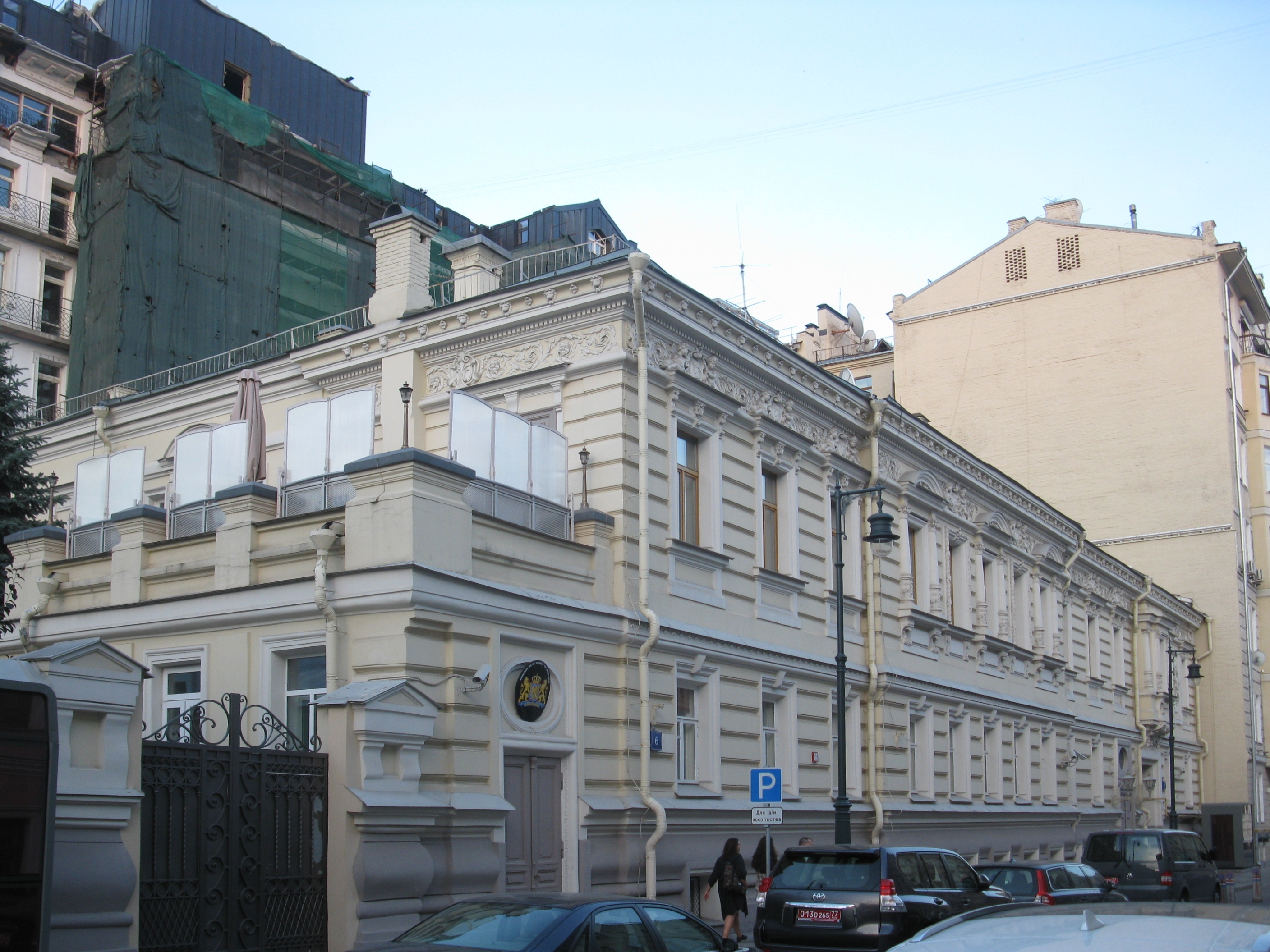
Embassy in Moscow

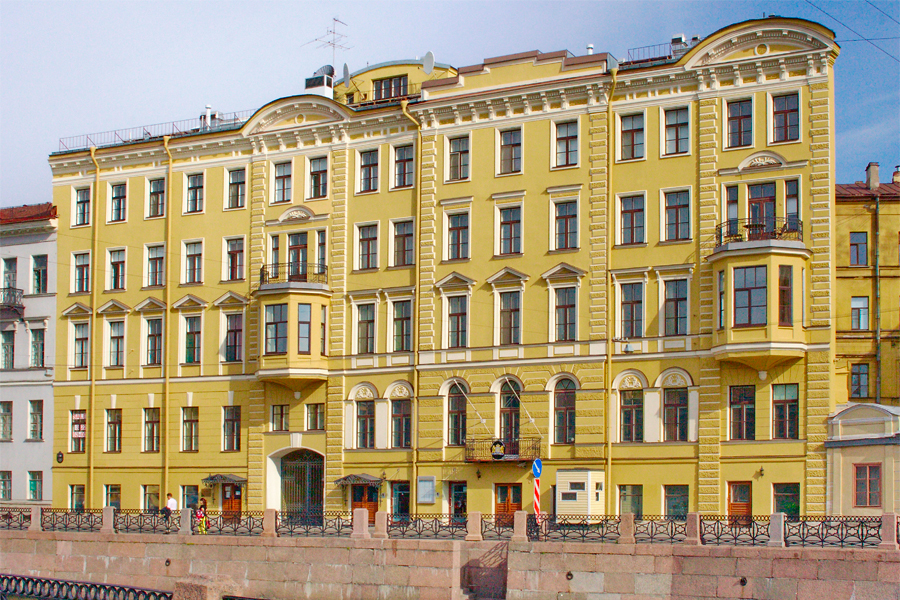
Consulate-General in St. Petersburg

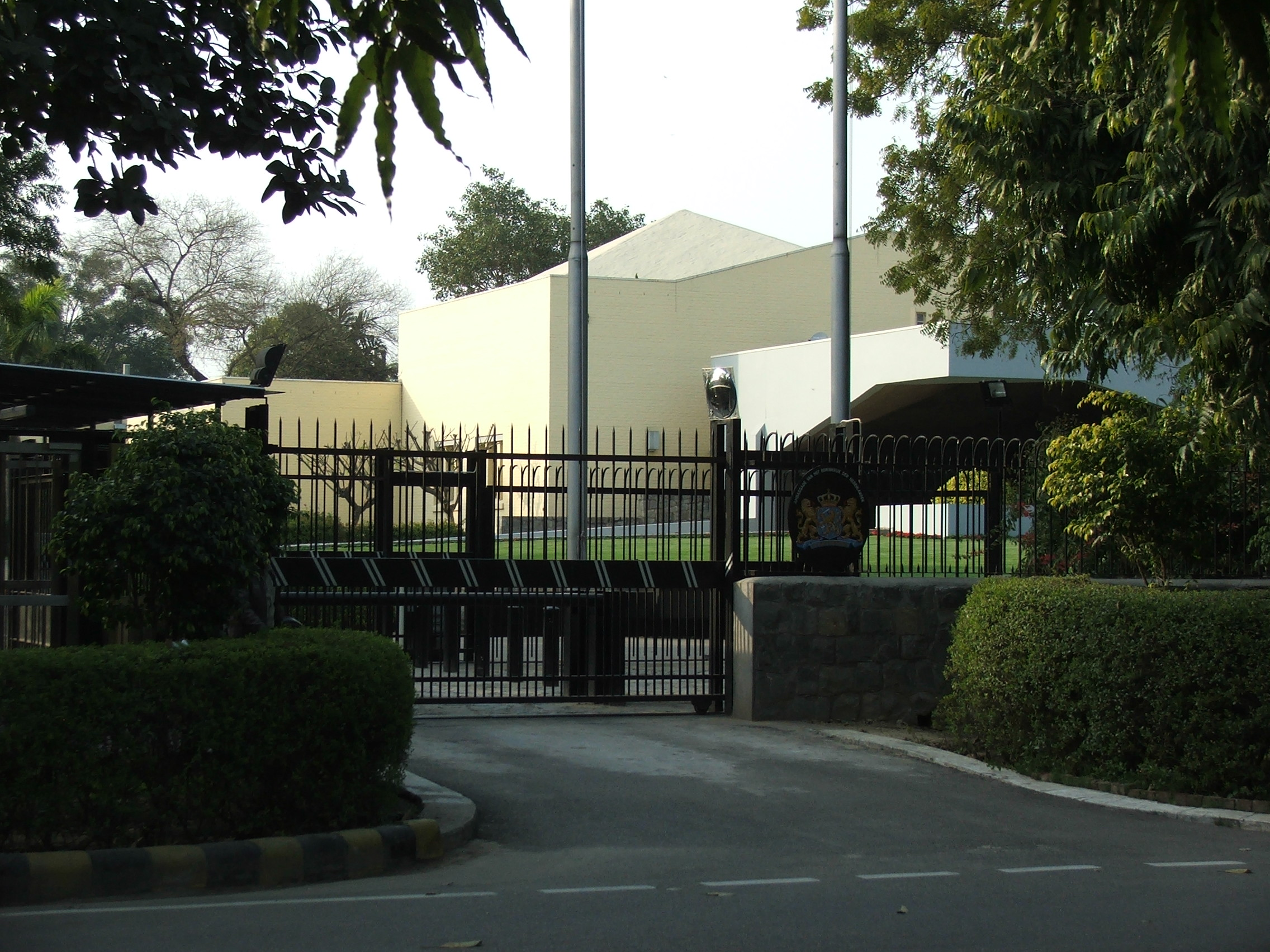
Embassy in New Delhi

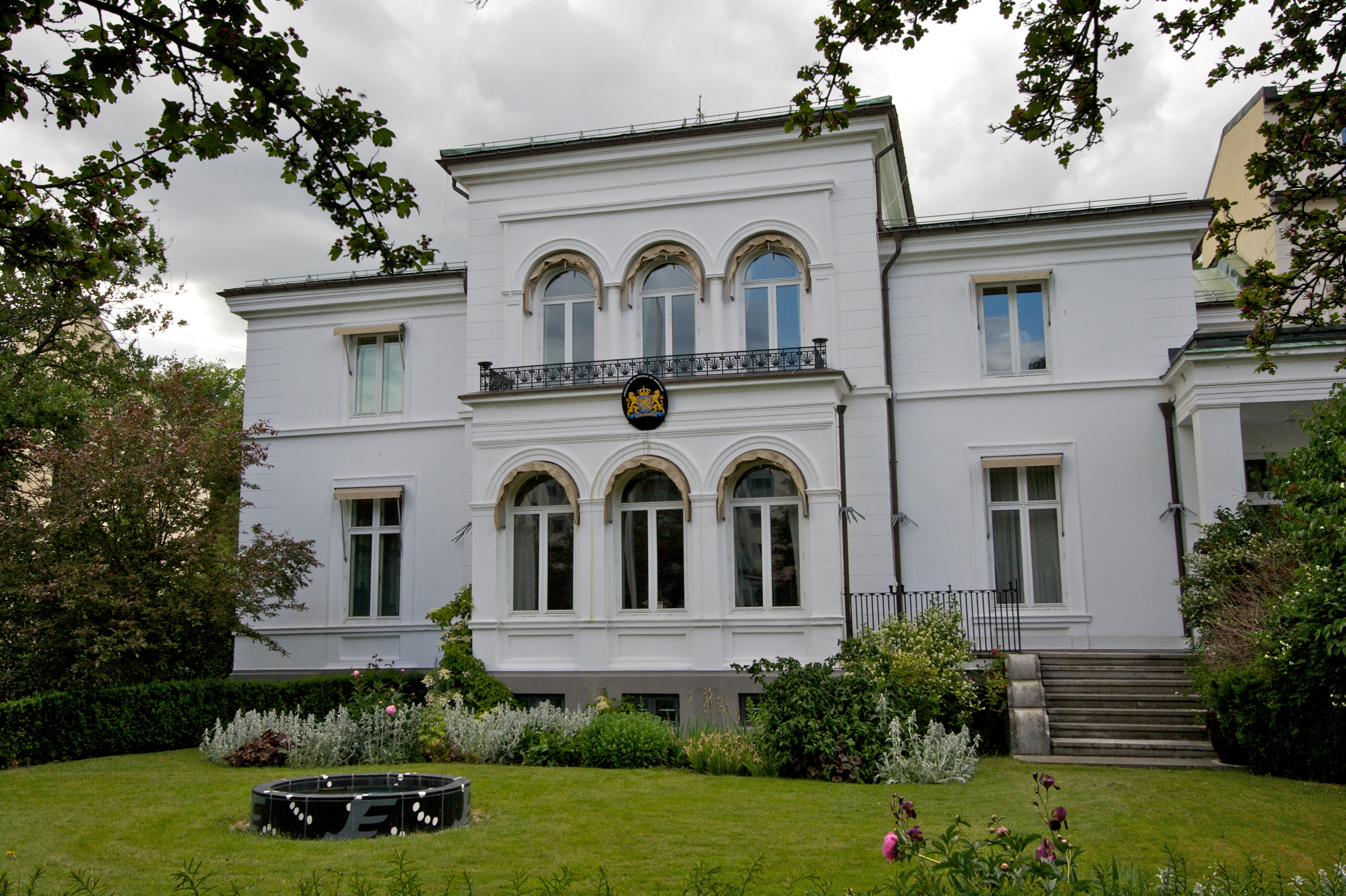
Embassy in Oslo

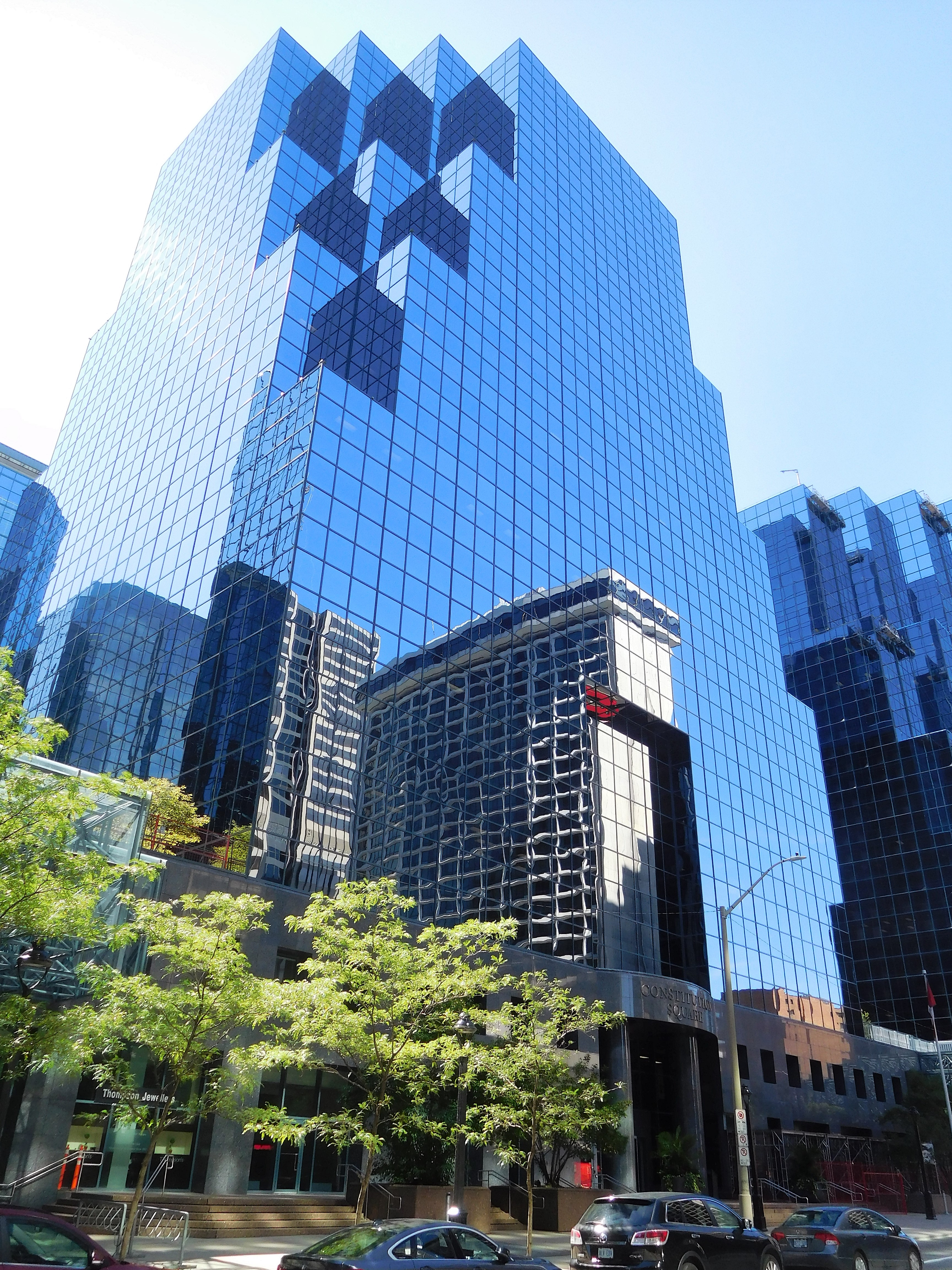
Building hosting the Embassy in Ottawa

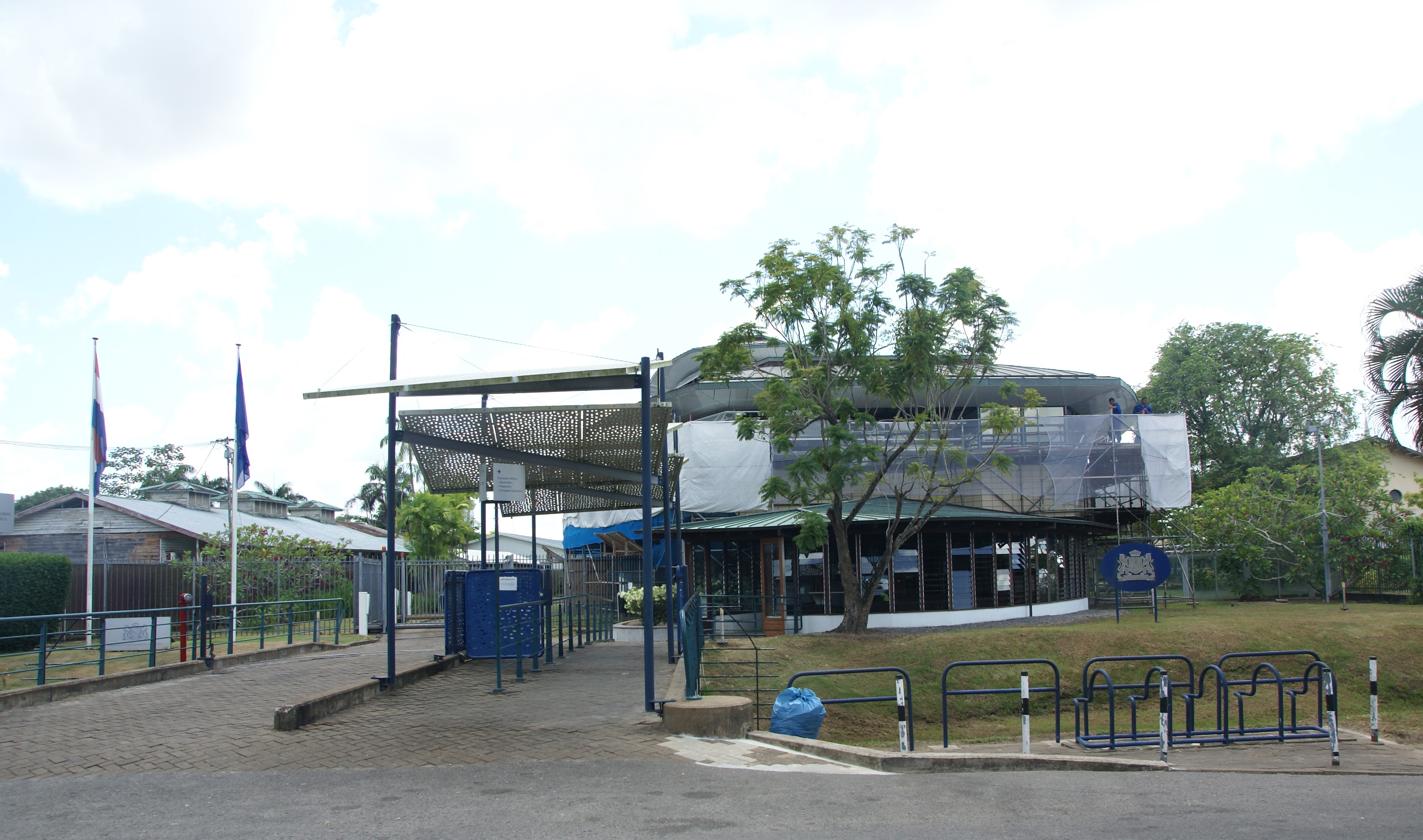
Embassy in Paramaribo

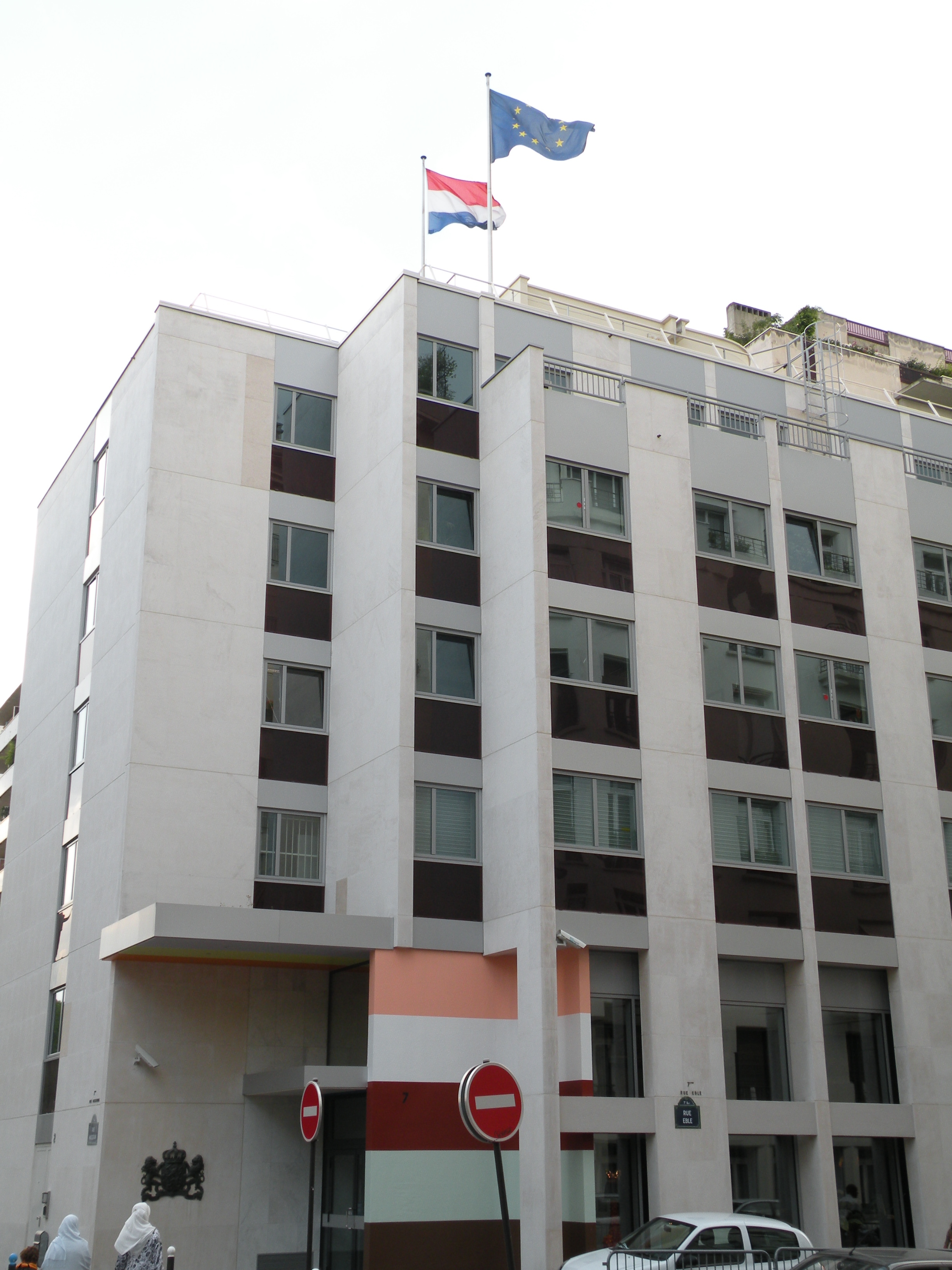
Embassy in Paris

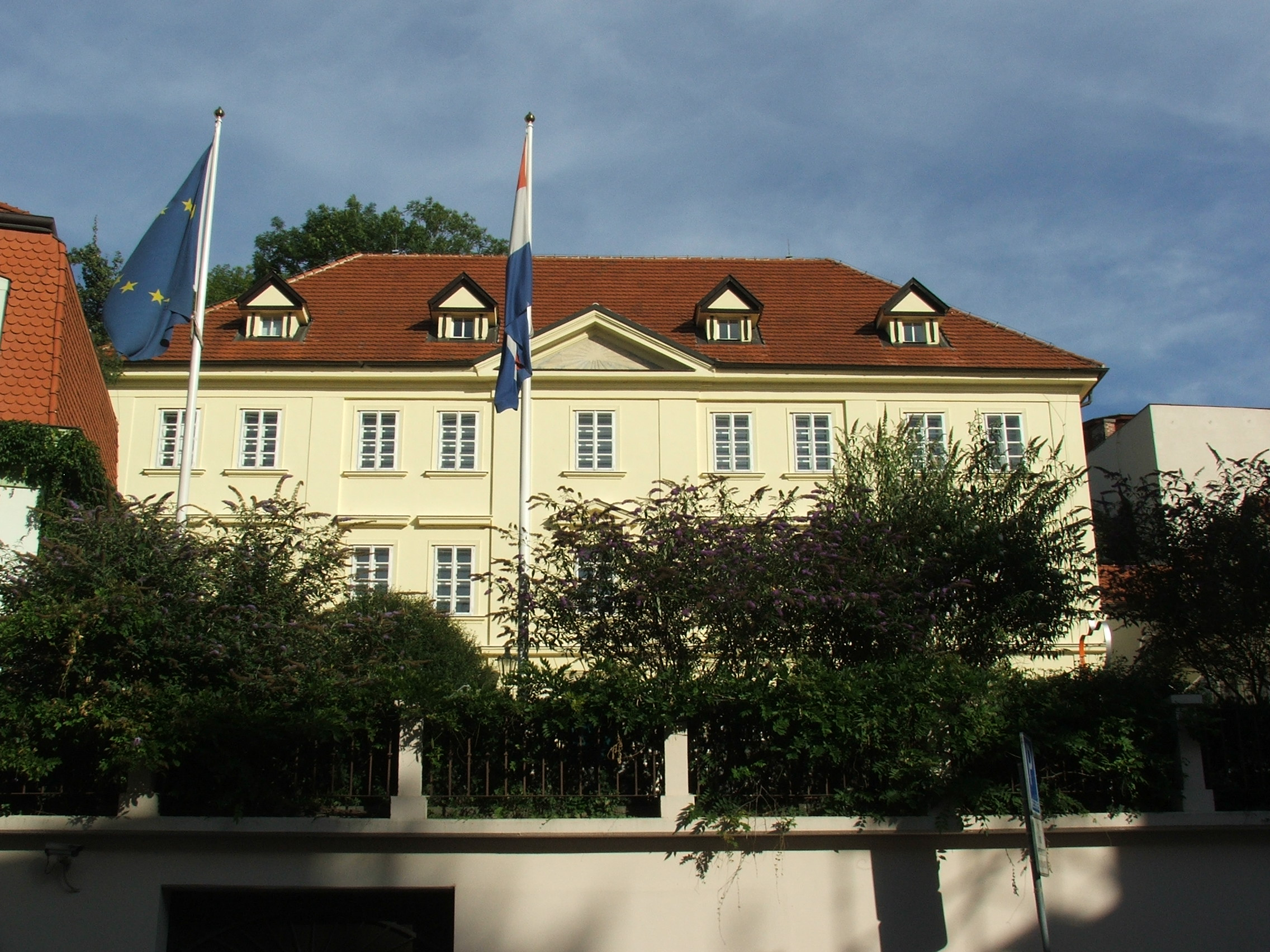
Embassy in Prague

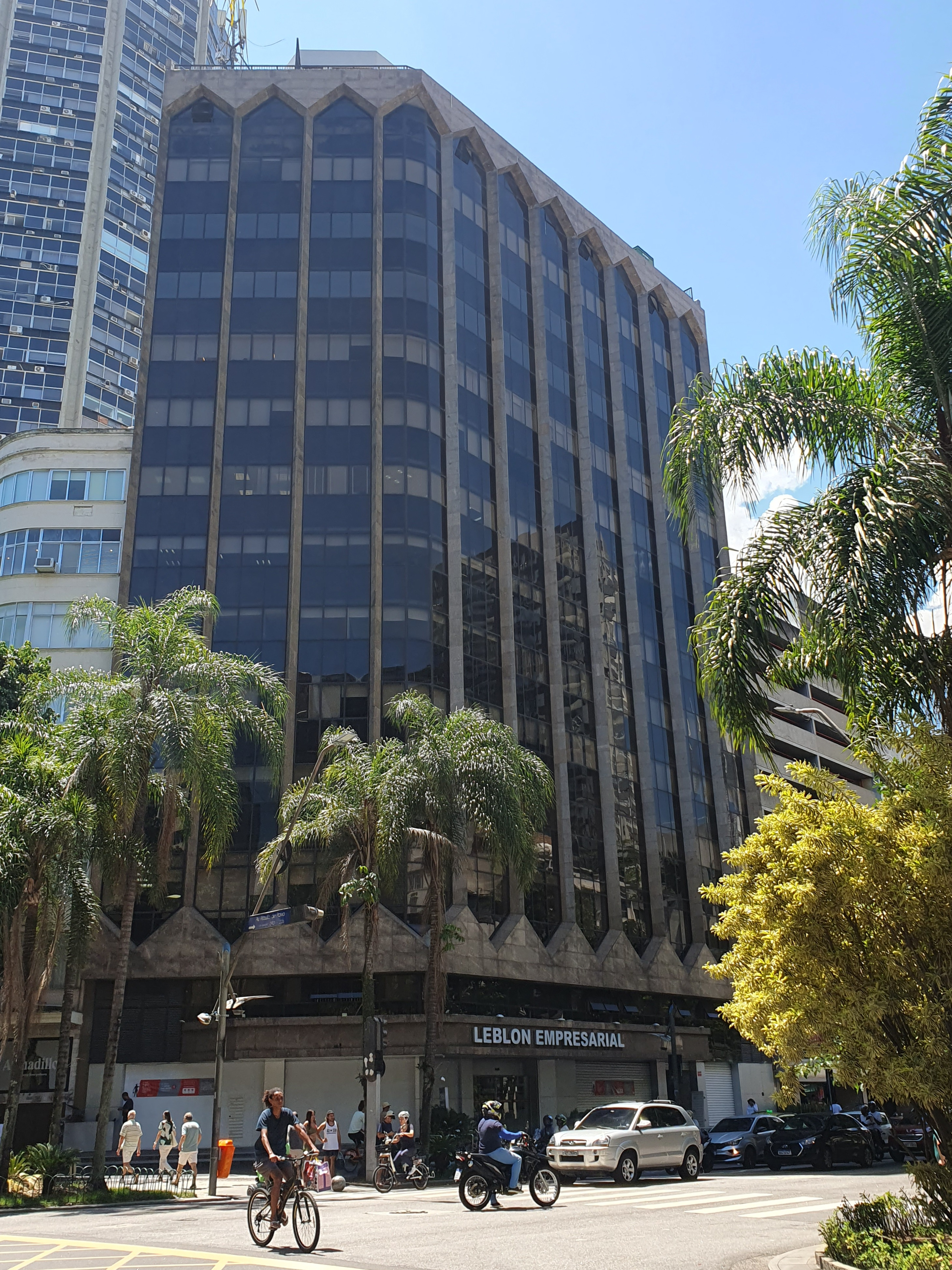
Building hosting the Consulate-General in Rio de Janeiro

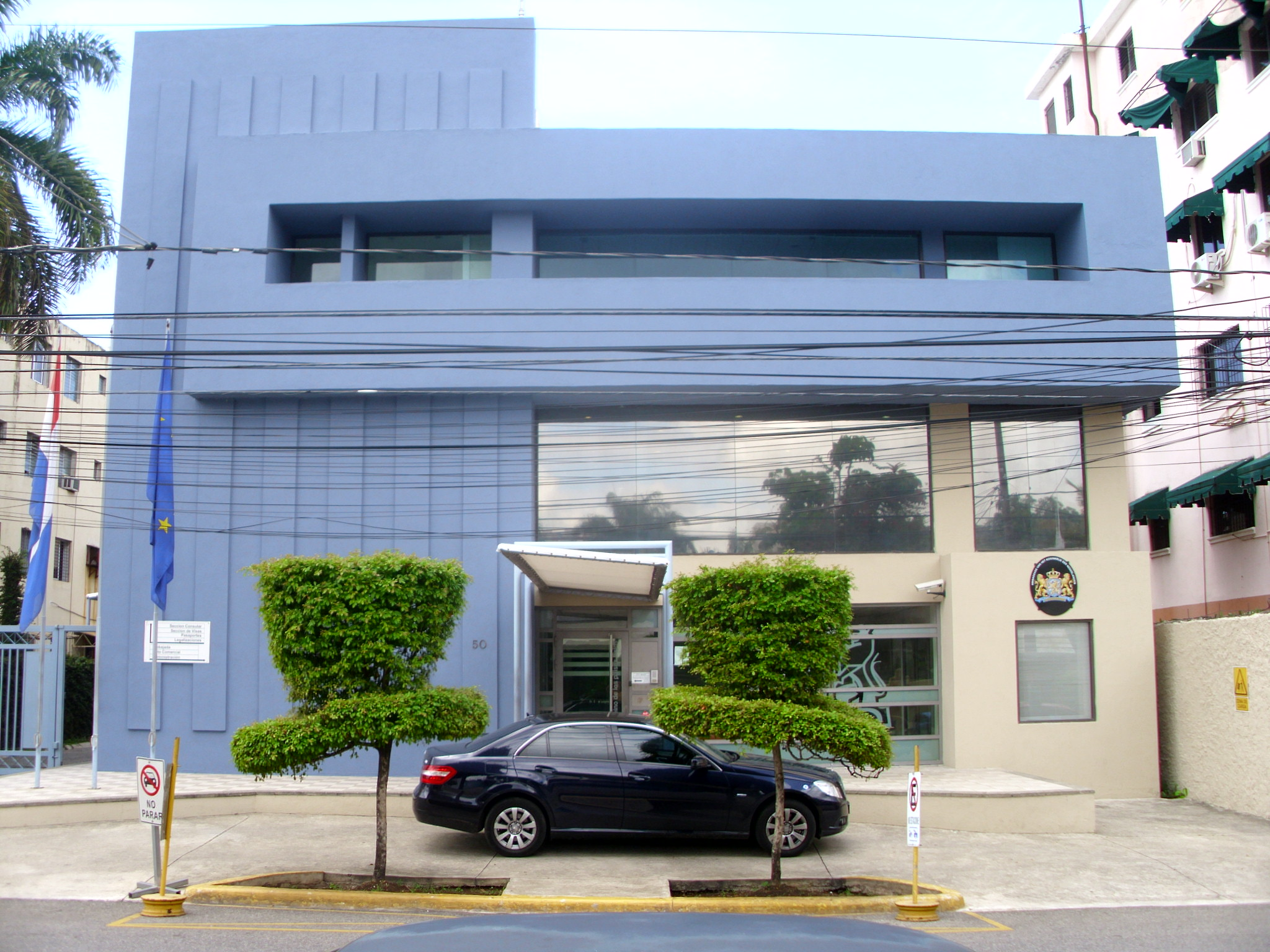
Embassy in Santo Domingo

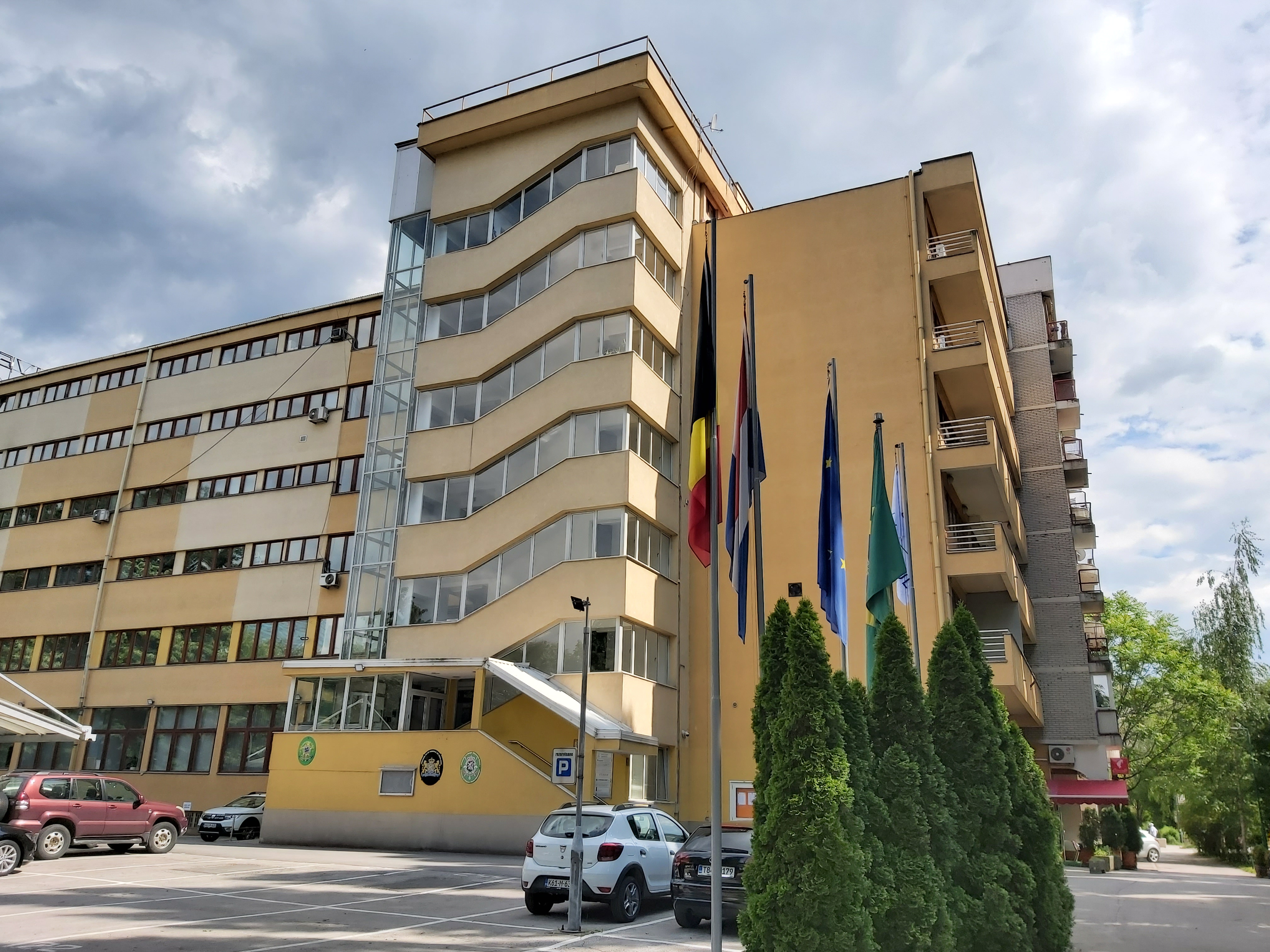
Building hosting the Embassy in Sarajevo

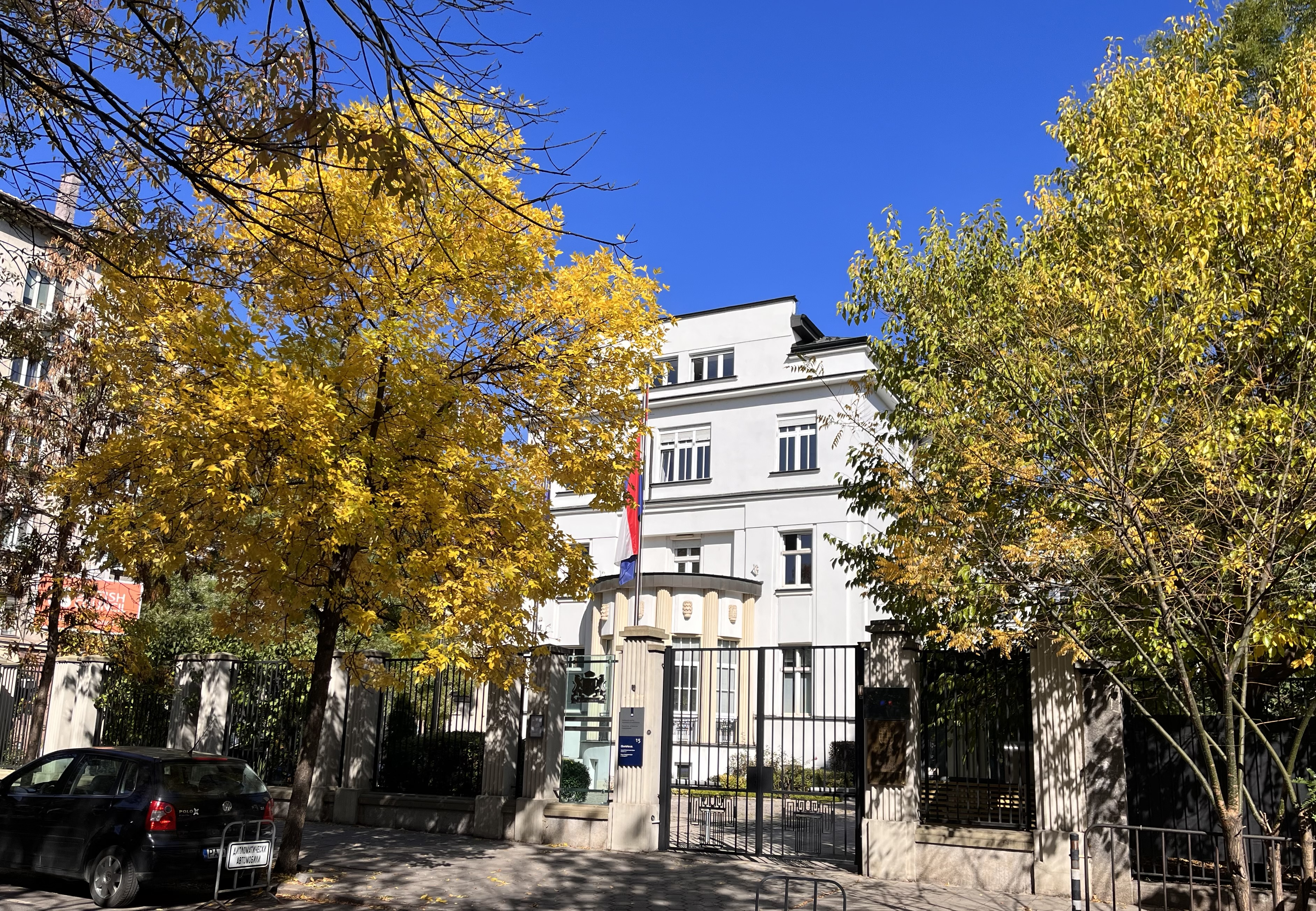
Embassy in Sofia

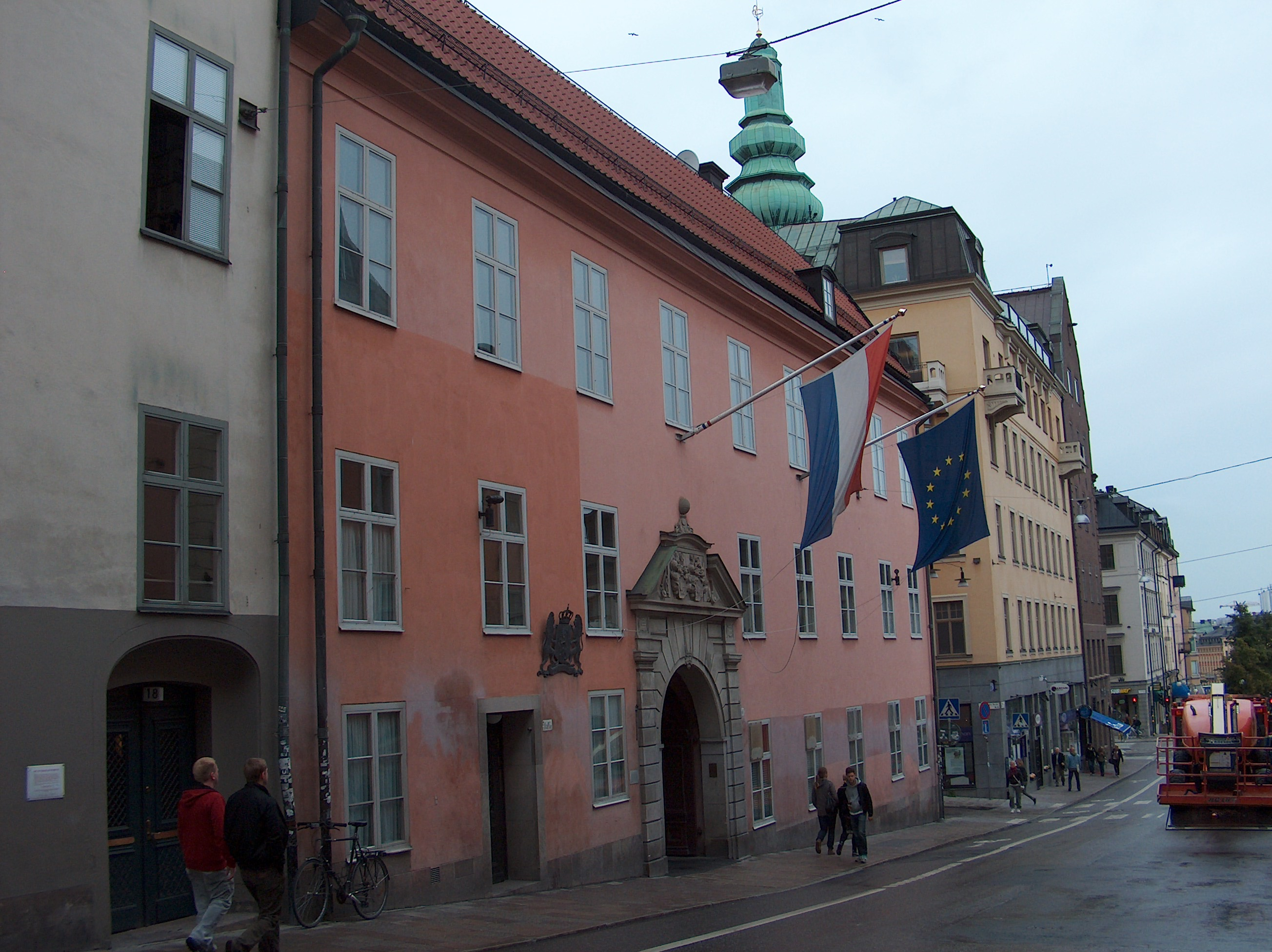
Embassy in Stockholm

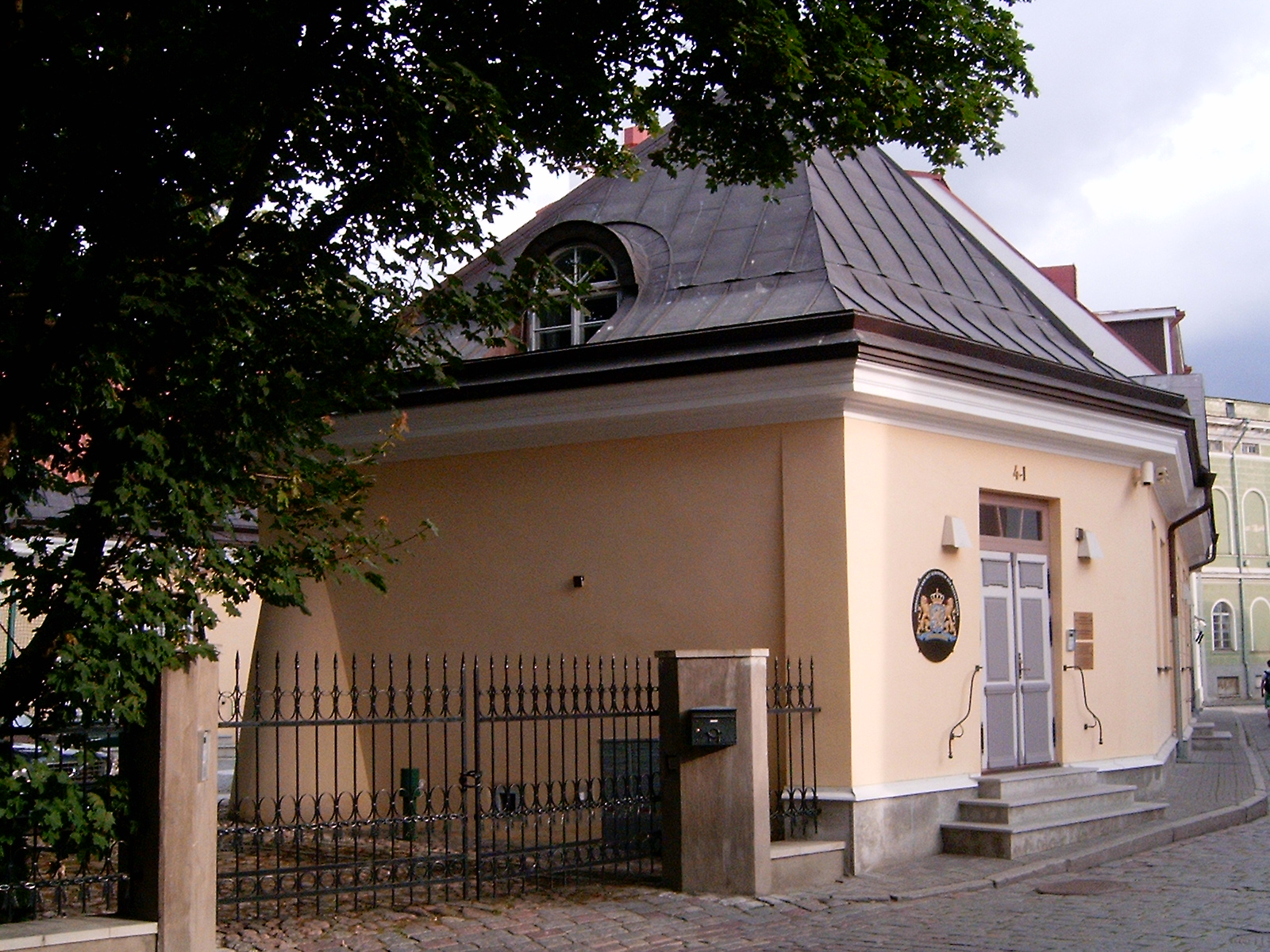
Embassy in Tallinn

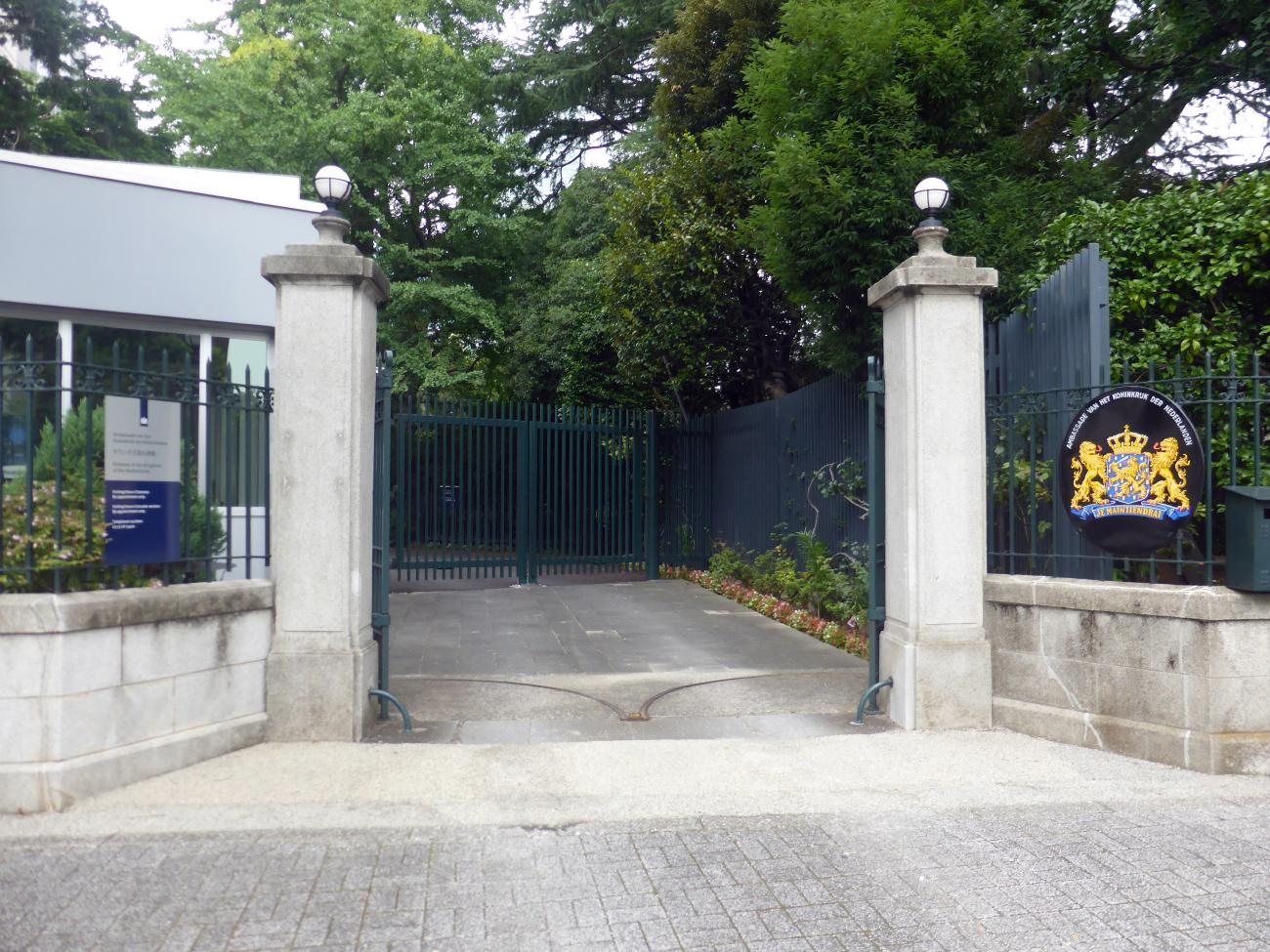
Embassy in Tokyo

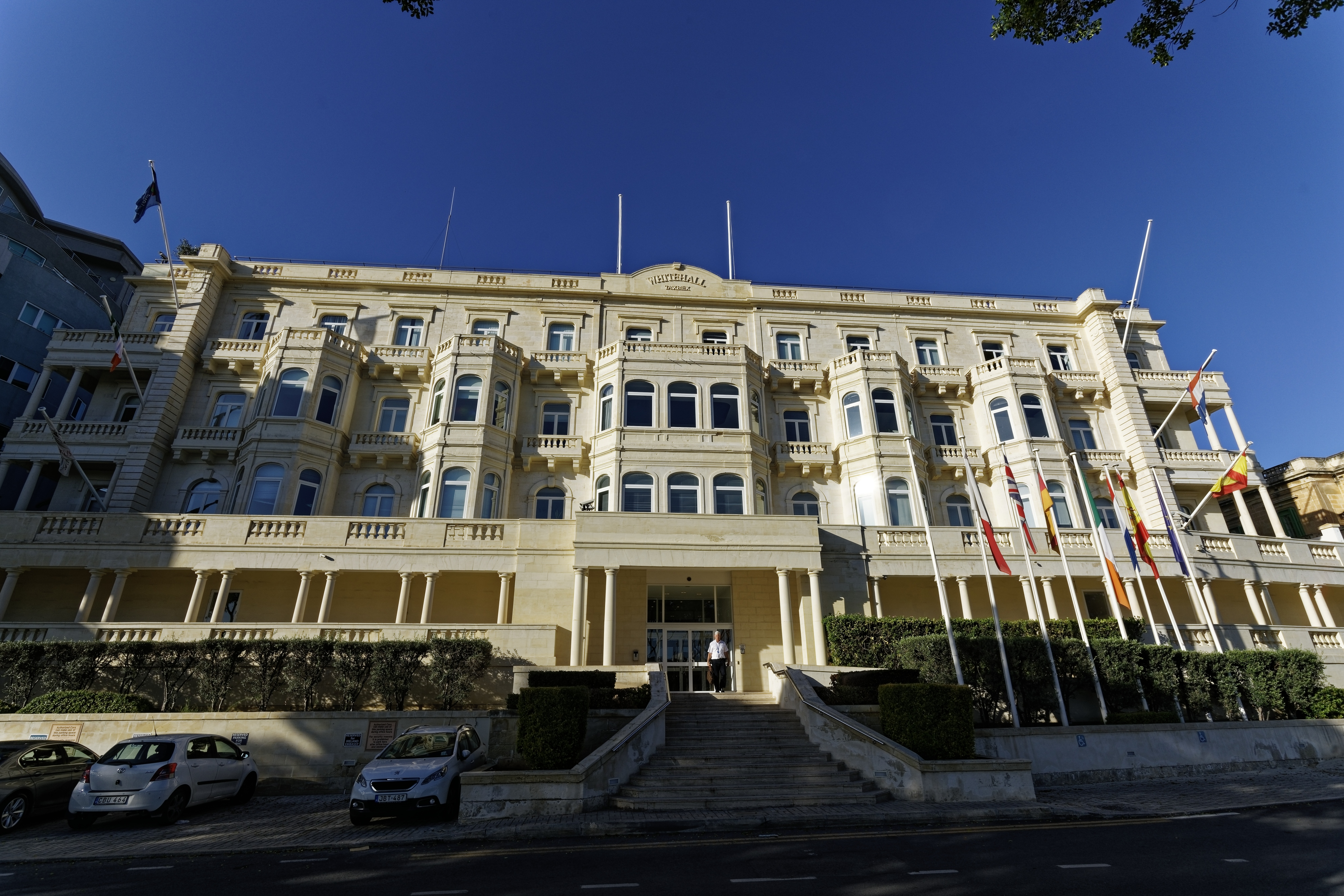
Building hosting the Embassy in Valletta

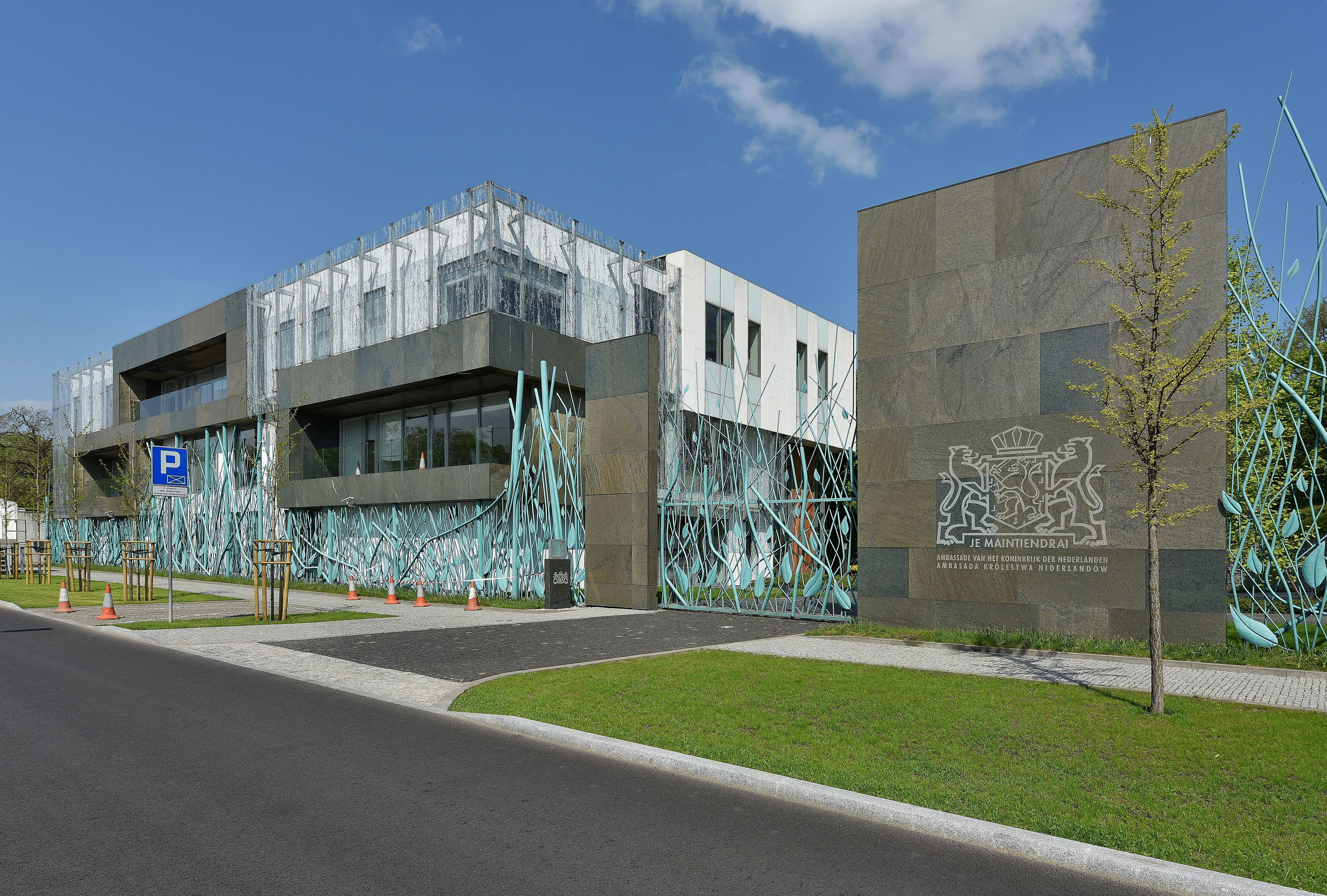
Embassy in Warsaw

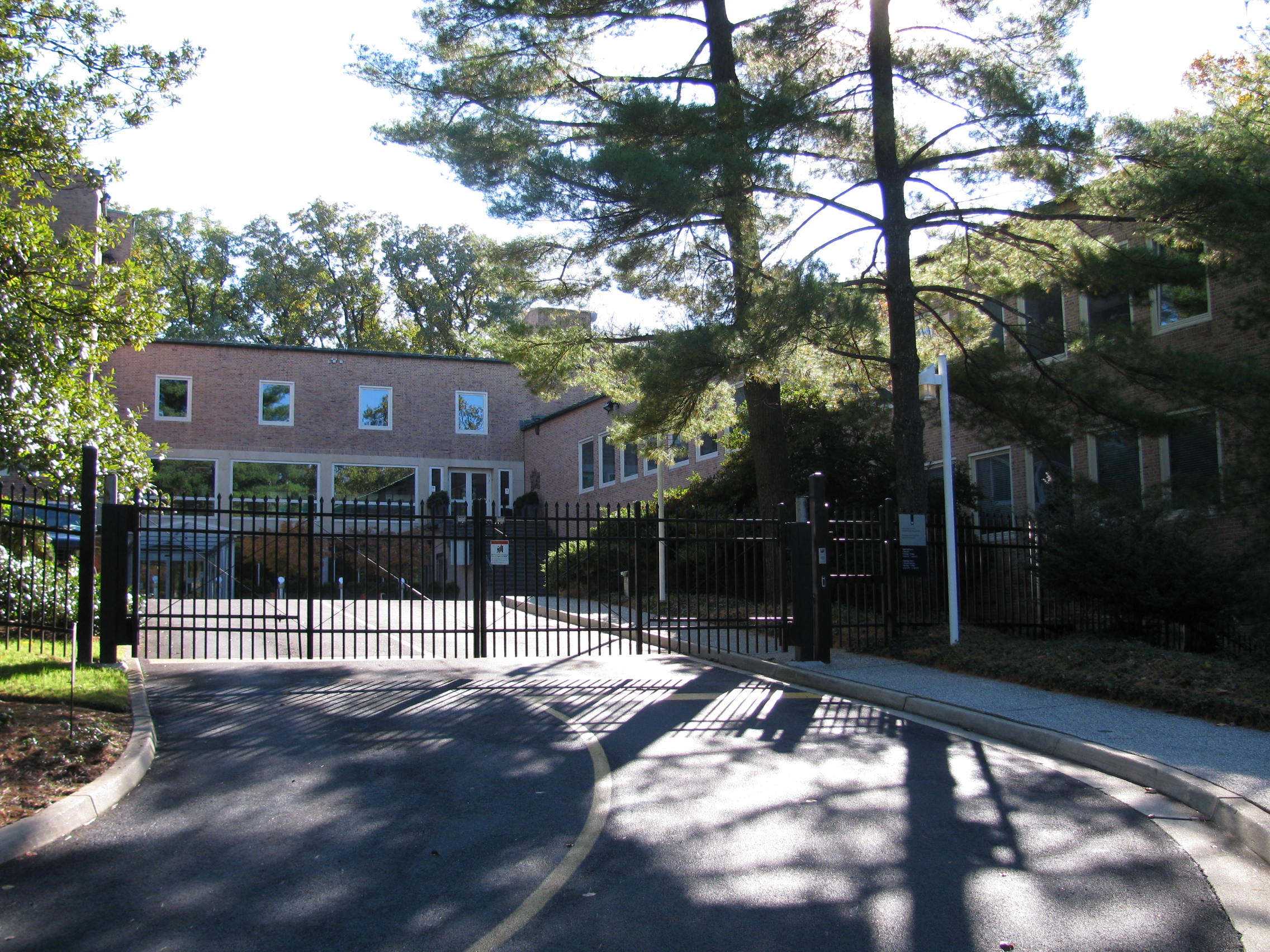
Embassy in Washington, D.C.

== Missions to open ==
Host country	Host city	Mission	Ref.
Namibia	Windhoek	Embassy	
Montenegro	Podgorica	Embassy	

== Closed missions ==
=== Africa ===
Host country	Host city	Mission	Year closed	Ref.
Cameroon	Yaoundé	Embassy	2011	
Eritrea	Asmara	Embassy	2011	
Namibia	Windhoek	Embassy (Note: To be reopened.)	2006	
Sudan	Khartoum	Embassy	2023	
Zambia	Lusaka	Embassy	2013	

=== Americas ===
Host country	Host city	Mission	Year closed	Ref.
Bolivia	La Paz	Embassy	2013	
Ecuador	Quito	Embassy	2012	
Nicaragua	Managua	Embassy	2013	
Uruguay	Montevideo	Embassy	2012	
United States	Houston	Consulate-General (Note: Originally a Consulate-General, was downgraded into a Consulate in 2004.)	2004	

=== Asia ===
Host country	Host city	Mission	Year closed	Ref.
Afghanistan	Kabul	Embassy	2021	
China	Chongqing	Consulate-General	2024	
South Vietnam (Note: The embassy closed down on 24 April 1975, in the midst of the Fall of Saigon, which marked the end of the Vietnam War and the start of a transition period to the formal reunification of Vietnam.)	Saigon	Embassy	1975	
Syria	Damascus	Embassy	2012	
Yemen	Sana'a	Embassy	2012	

=== Europe ===
Host country	Host city	Mission	Year closed	Ref.
Germany	Hamburg	Consulate-General	2009	
Spain	Barcelona	Consulate-General	2012	

== See also ==
- Foreign relations of the Netherlands
- List of diplomatic missions in the Netherlands
