= Embassy chapel =

Designated for prayer, congregation, or meditation in an embassy

An embassy chapel is a place of worship within a foreign diplomatic mission. Because embassies occupy premises considered under the principle of extraterritoriality to be exempt from the host country's laws, embassy chapels have historically been able to provide religious services to groups whose faith was prohibited or persecuted in the host country.

During the early modern period, embassy chapels served as clandestine churches, drawing worshippers from the local population who shared the faith of the embassy's home nation. Catholic embassy chapels in Great Britain, for example, continued to hold services while Catholicism was banned under the Penal Laws, and a Prussian embassy chapel in Rome served Protestant worshippers while Protestantism remained unlawful there until 1871.

As laws granting freedom of religion were adopted across Europe, many embassy chapels lost their function as protected places of worship. Some were converted into regular churches and parishes, such as the Dutch embassy chapel in Istanbul, which became The Union Church of Istanbul, while others were closed.

== History ==
Early modern embassy staff, who commonly lived in the ambassadorial residence, were permitted to have in-house chapels and chaplains, especially where, in the wake of the Reformation, they lived in a country that banned their religious faith. These soon drew members of the same faith to join the worship services in the embassy. The Dutch Republic sponsored chapels in twelve of its embassies, which acted as churches for local Reformed Protestants. Leopold I, Holy Roman Emperor sponsored chapels wherever he could, "that Catholic services might be held to comfort the Catholics of the area, and to promote the further growth of this religion." By the late eighteenth century, a new legal principle had come into being, extraterritoriality, according to which "the ambassador and the precincts of the embassy stood as if on the soil of his homeland, subject only to its laws." As religious freedom advanced with time, many of the embassy chapels lost their function as safe havens and were converted into churches proper or dismissed.

=== Catholic embassies in London ===
During the reign of Elizabeth I, Catholicism was gradually outlawed in England, and Catholic masses and worship were prohibited, particularly after the Oath of Supremacy of 1559. With the "Act to retain the Queen's Majesty's subjects in their obedience", passed in 1581, the celebration of Mass was prohibited under penalty of a fine of two hundred marks and imprisonment for one year for the celebrant, and a fine of one hundred marks and the same imprisonment for those who heard the Mass. The reign of Charles I (1625–49) saw a small revival of Catholicism in England, especially among the upper classes. As part of their royal marriage settlement, Charles's Catholic wife, Henrietta Maria, was permitted her own royal chapel (the Queen's Chapel in London, as well as a chapel at Somerset House) and chaplain.

Ambassadors of Catholic nations sought to provide relief for persecuted English Catholics by protecting worship at their chapels with diplomatic immunity. The English government attempted unsuccessfully several times to dissuade such use of the Spanish and Portuguese embassies between 1563 and 1611. In 1610, James I asked foreign ambassadors not to allow English priests to celebrate at, or English Catholics to attend, their chapels, but only the Venetian ambassador complied. Starting in 1624, several arrests of English Catholics leaving these embassy chapels were made, which irritated the French ambassador, the Marquis of Blainville. On March 10, 1630, an order in council forbade Catholics to hear Mass at the embassies. The next Sunday, as reported by the Venetian ambassador, guards were placed in front of the French, Venetian and Spanish embassies, and Catholics were arrested as they left the premises; afterwards the Spanish ambassador, Don Carlos Coloma, unsuccessfully tried to obtain their release. Coloma defused the issue by taking residence in the countryside, and demanding that the English government punish those who had violated his diplomatic immunity. Five years later, on April 12, 1635, the council directed Sir John Coke to inform the ambassadors that their diplomatic rights would not be infringed upon, but that penal laws against Catholics would be pursued. When a priest who had said Mass was captured and escaped to the house of the French ambassador Henri de Saint-Nectaire, where he was then recaptured, he was set free because of the right of extraterritoriality, and his pursuers were punished. Over time, enforcement of the law became lenient; Venetian ambassador Anzolo Corer wrote in 1636 that Mass at the chapel of the Queen and at the embassies was "frequented with freedom." In 1637, large crowds attended Mass daily at the Spanish embassy.

In eighteenth-century London, there were chapels in the French, Spanish, Florentine, Venetian (in the Haymarket), Portuguese (originally in Golden Square, then in South Street, Grosvenor Square), Austrian (on Hanover Street), Neapolitan (in Soho Square), Bavarian (on Warwick Street) and Sardinian embassies. In London, the streets outside the houses and house chapels of the Spanish, French and Venetian embassies were the scenes of public protests, sometimes violent. The police sometimes attempted to detain British people who attended Catholic services in the embassy chapels. Embassy chapels led to diplomatic tension between the English government and the Catholic governments who operated the embassies between 1625 and 1660. In the eighteenth century, English subjects ceased to be harassed for attending services at the Sardinian embassy. On Easter Sunday 1772 James Boswell and Pasquale Paoli "worshipped together at the Sardinian Chapel." When Catholic worship became allowed in London in 1791 with the Roman Catholic Relief Act, the Bavarian, Sardinian and Spanish embassy churches were converted into churches, while the others (Venetian, Neapolitan, Imperial, French and Florentine) were dismissed.

== List ==
=== In London ===
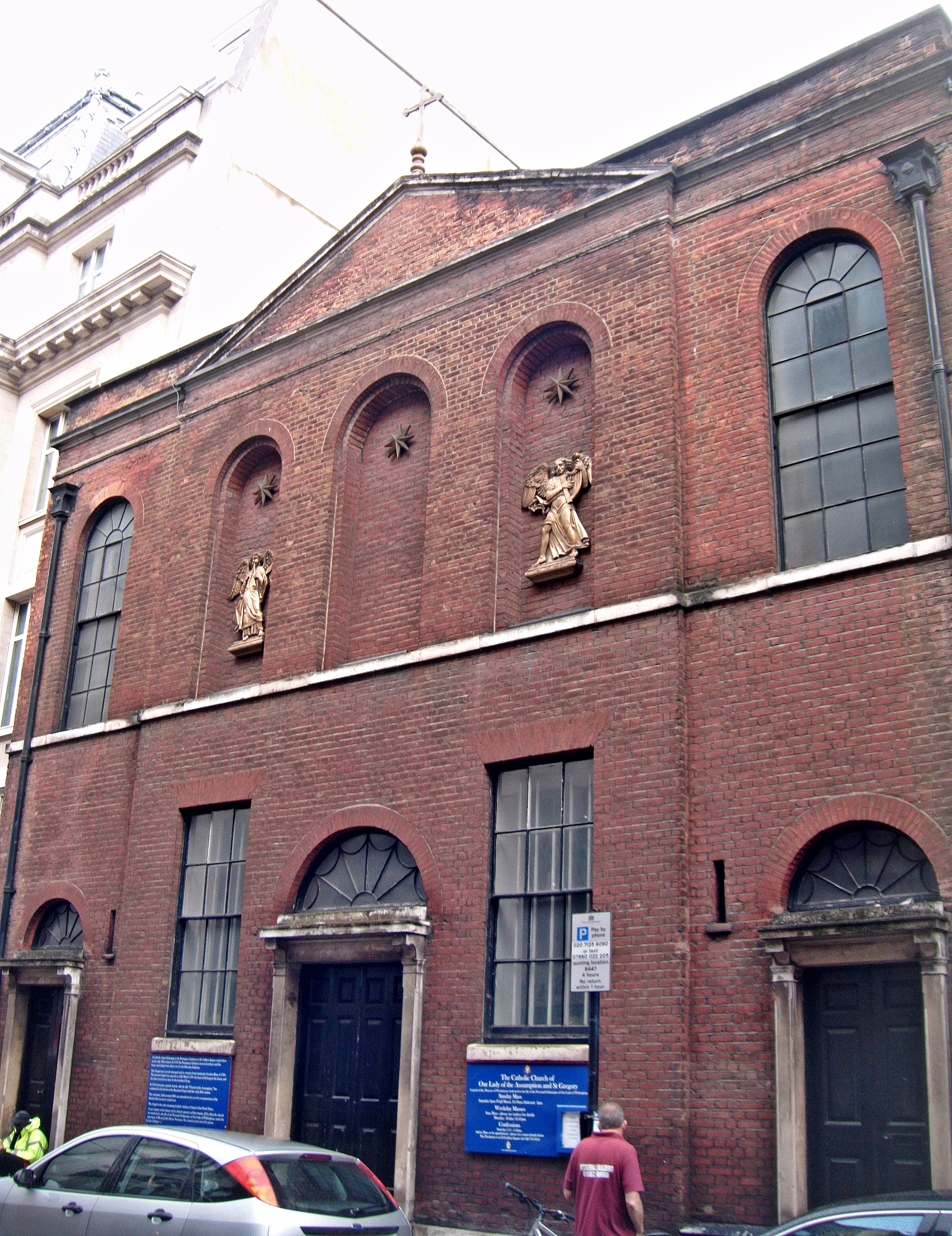
The Church of Our Lady of the Assumption and St Gregory, which was the chapel of the Portuguese Embassy between 1730 and 1747, and the chapel of the Bavarian embassy afterwards.

- Sardinian Embassy Chapel
- Spanish Embassy Chapel, now St James's, Spanish Place
- Royal Bavarian Chapel (Portuguese and then Bavarian embassy)
- French, Florentine, Neapolitan, Venetian, and Austrian embassies (non extant today)
- Russian Orthodox Chapel, former Russian Embassy in Welbeck Street
- St Etheldreda's Church

=== British chapels abroad ===
- St George's chapel in the British Embassy in Madrid, today St George's Anglican Church
- Chapel and English Cemetery in the British Consulate in Málaga
- British Embassy Chapel in Paris
- Christ Church, Jerusalem, the seat of the Anglican Diocese of Jerusalem, located on the site of the British Consulate until World War 1

=== Other ===
- Prussian Embassy chapel in the Cottarelli Palace in Rome
- Prussian embassy chapel in Turin, which hosted the Waldensian community before it was legalized in 1848
- The Union Church of Istanbul, which started as the Dutch embassy chapel in Istanbul
- Our Lady of Divine Providence Chapel, Kabul, the chapel of the Italian Embassy
- Chapel of the Transfiguration, Ashgabat (Apostolic nunciature in Turkmenistan)
- Dormition of the Most Holy Theotokos Church in Beijing (Russian Embassy)
- Orthodox church of Saint Catherine in Rome (Russian Embassy)
- Church of the Metamorphosis (Kottakis) (Russian embassy in Athens)
- Church of Saint Benoit, Istanbul and St Louis of the French chapels in Istanbul (French embassy)
- Spanish embassy chapel in Istanbul
- Orthodox chapel in the Russian embassy in Turin
- Ar-Rahman Mosque located inside the Iranian embassy in Pyongyang, North Korea

== See also ==
- House church
- Clandestine church
