= Protestantism in Turkey =

Protestants are a very small religious minority in Turkey, comprising less than one tenth of one percent of the population. In 2022, there were an estimated 7,000-10,000 Protestants and evangelical Christians.

Though, there are several significant and major Protestant churches and worship sites in Turkey protected legally, most of them are located in the 4 large cities of Istanbul, Izmir, Ankara and Bursa.

Considerable ones and significant communities include the Union Church of Istanbul meeting at the Dutch Chapel, German Protestant Church (Istanbul), Armenian Protestant Church (Istanbul) and the All Saints Church in Istanbul.

== Discrimination and persecution ==
The constitution of Turkey recognizes the freedom of religion for individuals. The Armenian Protestants own three Istanbul Churches from the 19th century.

On November 4, 2006, a Protestant place of worship was attacked with six Molotov cocktails. In 2007, three Protestants were killed at a Bible publishing house in Malatya, allegedly by the illegal and split-away gendarmerie unit JİTEM. Turkish pro-AKP (government) and conservative media have criticized Christian missionary activity intensely.

There is an Alliance of Protestant Churches in Turkey, supporting protection of Protestant rights legally.

By 2022, many Protestant churches reported difficulties in registering places of worship, while some reported that local authorities did not allow the display of crosses on the exterior of their buildings; it is also reported that Protestants wishing to become clergy must leave the country for training, while non-Turkish clergy have difficulty in obtaining visas.

== Turkish converts ==
There is an ethnic Turkish Protestant Christian community in Turkey numbering around ~10,000, mostly adherents, and most of them coming from a Muslim Turkish background. In 2003, the Milliyet newspaper claimed that 35,000 Turkish Muslims had converted to Christianity.

A 2015 study estimates about 4,500 Christians are from a previous Muslim background in the country. While other sources estimated the number of the Turkish who converted to Christianity (most of them secret worshippers) between 4,000–6,000, or more than those numbers.

== Protestant denominations ==
- Baptist church
- Bulgarian Congregational Church
- Church of England (Anglican)
- Evangelical Alliance Church
- German Protestant Church (Lutheran & Reformed)
- Greek Evangelical Church
- Religious Society of Friends (Quaker)
- Turkish Protestant Church
- Union Church of Istanbul
- Union of the Armenian Evangelical Churches in the Near East

== See also ==
- Christianity in Turkey
- Religious minorities in Turkey
- Religion in Turkey
