= John Hobart, 2nd Earl of Buckinghamshire =

British politician, courtier and diplomat (1723–1793)

The Right Honourable The Earl of Buckinghamshire PC
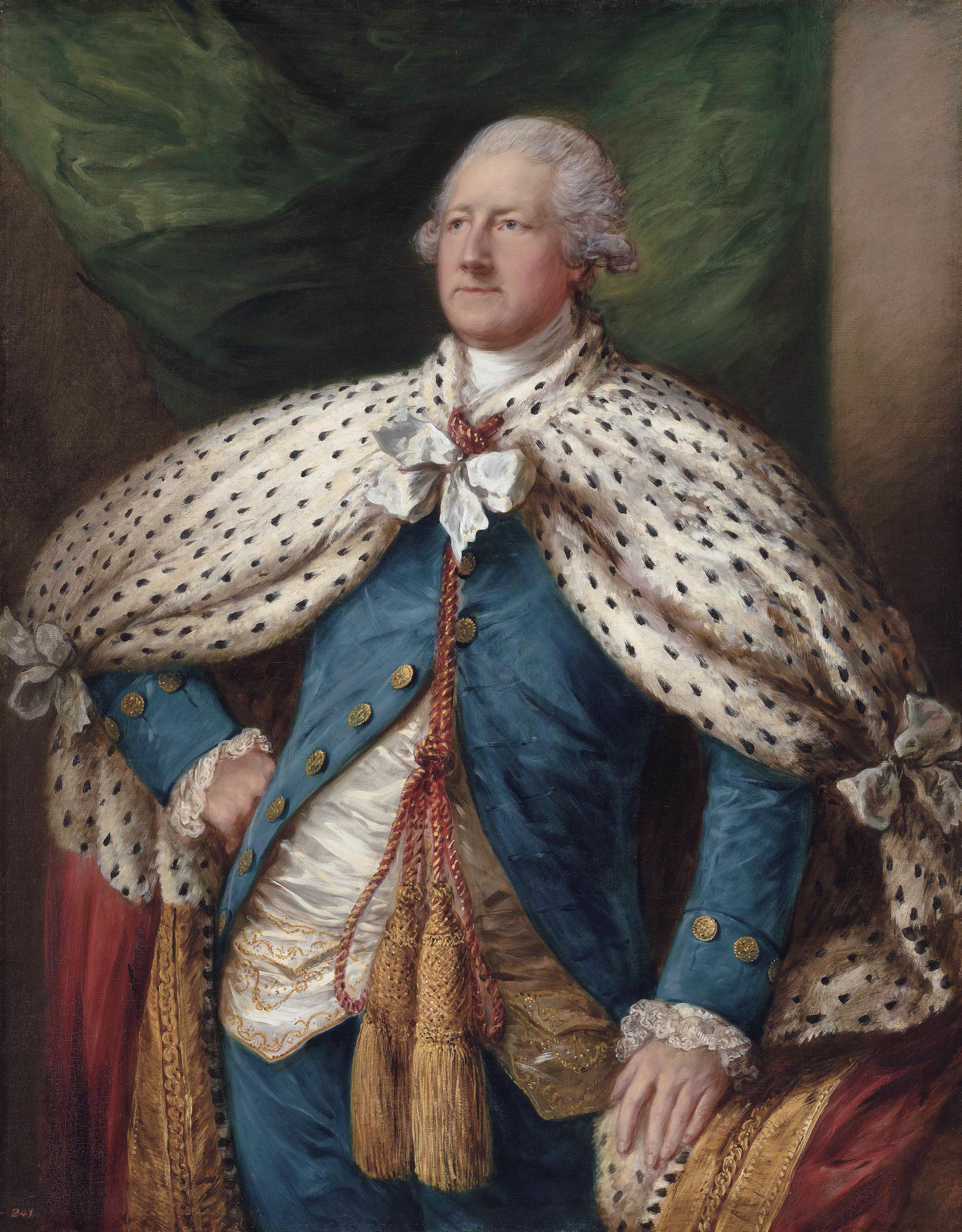
- Portrait of the Earl of Buckinghamshire by Thomas Gainsborough, 1784

Lord Lieutenant of Ireland
- In office 7 December 1776 – 19 November 1780
- Preceded by: The Earl Harcourt
- Succeeded by: The Earl of Carlisle

Personal details
- Born: 17 August 1723
- Died: 3 August 1793 (aged 69)
- Spouse(s): Mary Anne Drury; Caroline Conolly
- Children: 7, including Amelia
- Parent(s): John Hobart, 1st Earl of Buckinghamshire; Judith Britiffe

John Hobart, 2nd Earl of Buckinghamshire (17 August 1723 – 3 August 1793) was a British politician, courtier and diplomat who served as the Lord Lieutenant of Ireland from 1776 to 1780.

== Biography ==
The son of John Hobart, 1st Earl of Buckinghamshire by his first wife Judith Britiffe, he was educated at Westminster School and Christ's College, Cambridge. He was Member of Parliament for Norwich from 1747 to 1756, having also been elected for St Ives in 1747 but opting to sit for Norwich. He held office as Comptroller of the Household in 1755-56 and as a Lord of the Bedchamber from 1756 to 1767, having succeeded his father as Earl in 1756. He was Ambassador from the United Kingdom to Russia from 1762 to 1765 and Lord Lieutenant of Ireland from 1776 to 1780, when his Chief Secretary was Sir Richard Heron, Bt. In the latter role, he had to concede free trade and, more importantly, the enactment of the Papists Act 1778 which partially repealed the Penal laws and provided measures for the relief of Roman Catholics and Dissenters.

== Family ==
He married firstly Mary Anne Drury, daughter of Sir Thomas Drury, 1st Baronet, and secondly, Caroline, daughter of William James Conolly, but died without surviving male issue and was succeeded by his half-brother George Hobart, 3rd Earl of Buckinghamshire.

He had three daughters by his first wife:

- Lady Harriet, Marchioness of Lothian (1762–1805), who married William Kerr, 6th Marquess of Lothian, and was the mother of John Kerr, 7th Marquess of Lothian
- Lady Caroline (died 1850), who married William Assheton Harbord, 2nd Baron Suffield
- Lady Sophia (1768–1806), who married Richard Edgcumbe, 2nd Earl of Mount Edgcumbe

and three sons, who died young, and one daughter by his second wife:

- Amelia Stewart, Viscountess Castlereagh (1772–1829), wife of the Foreign Secretary Robert Stewart, Viscount Castlereagh.

He was laid to rest in the family mausoleum at Blickling Hall, the family seat in Norfolk. The bodies of his two wives are also in the mausoleum, which is an unusual Grade II* listed pyramidal structure designed by architect Joseph Bonomi the Elder, based on Pyramid of Cestius in Rome.

== Gallery ==
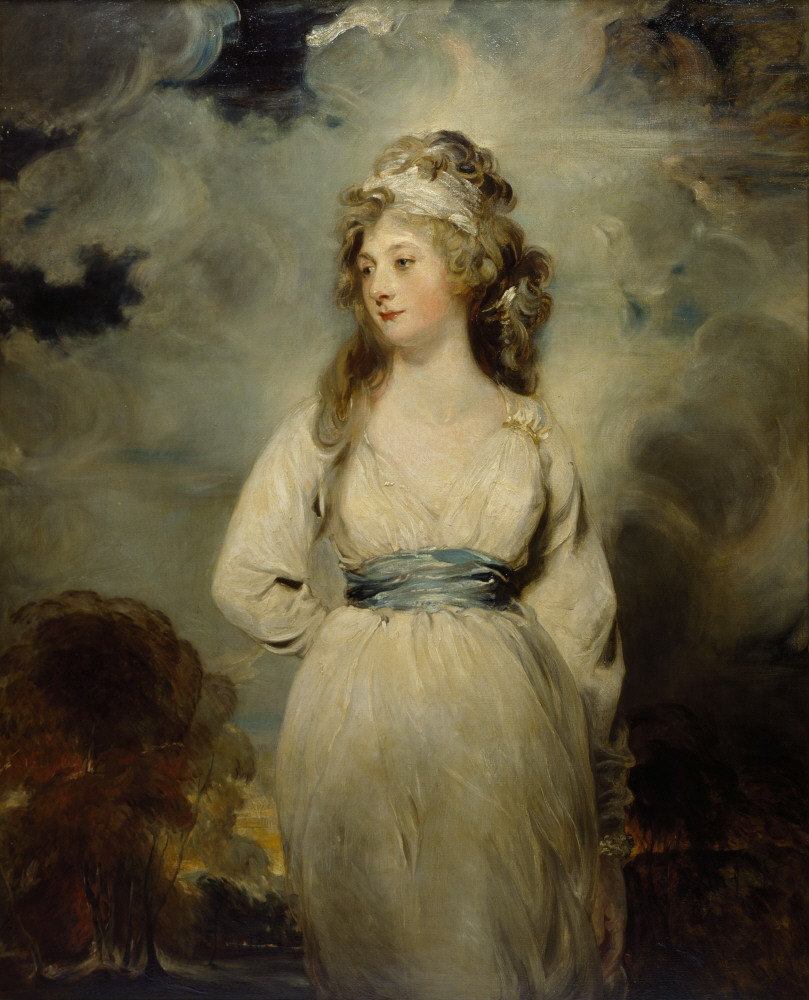
His daughter, Amelia Stewart, Viscountess Castlereagh

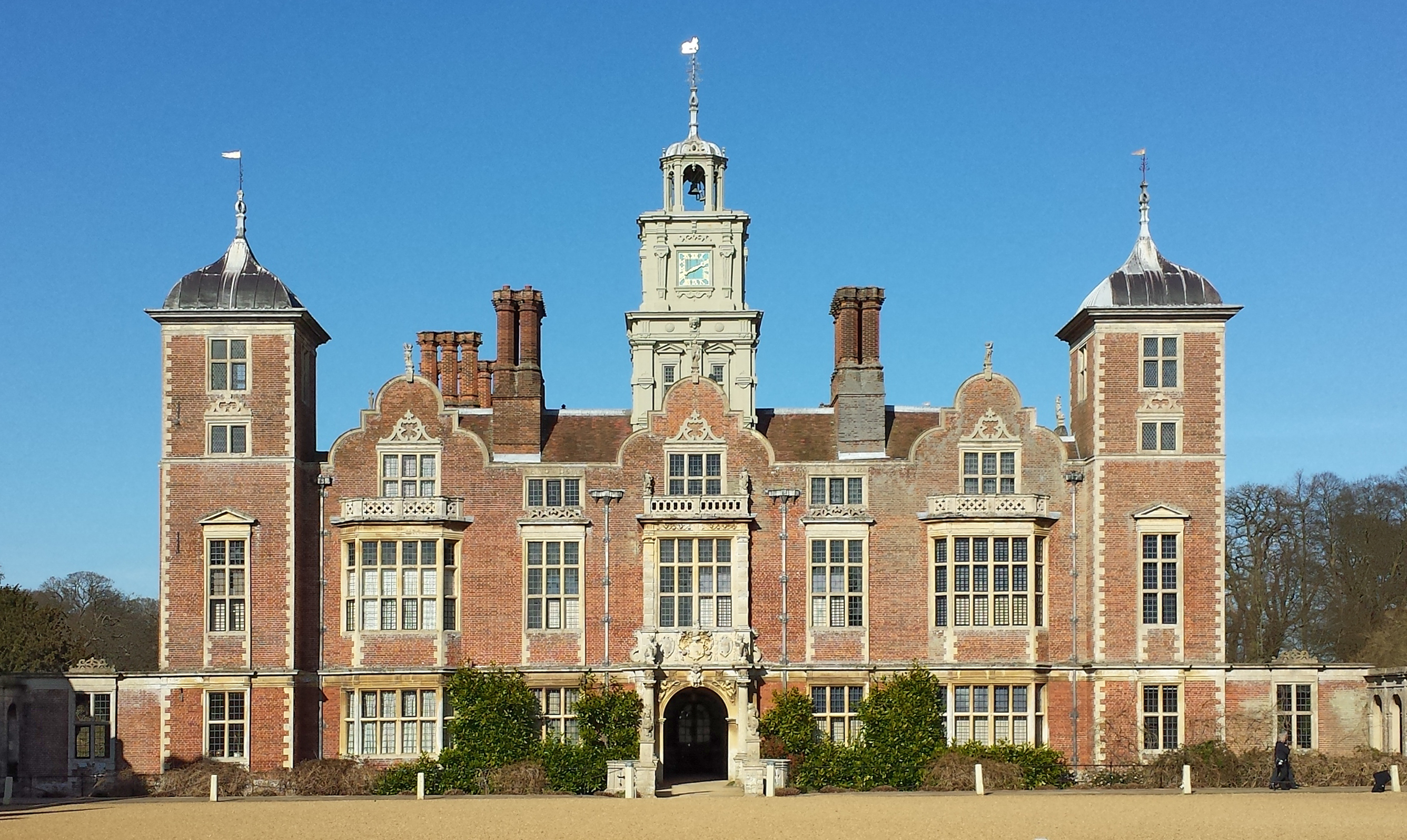
Blickling Hall

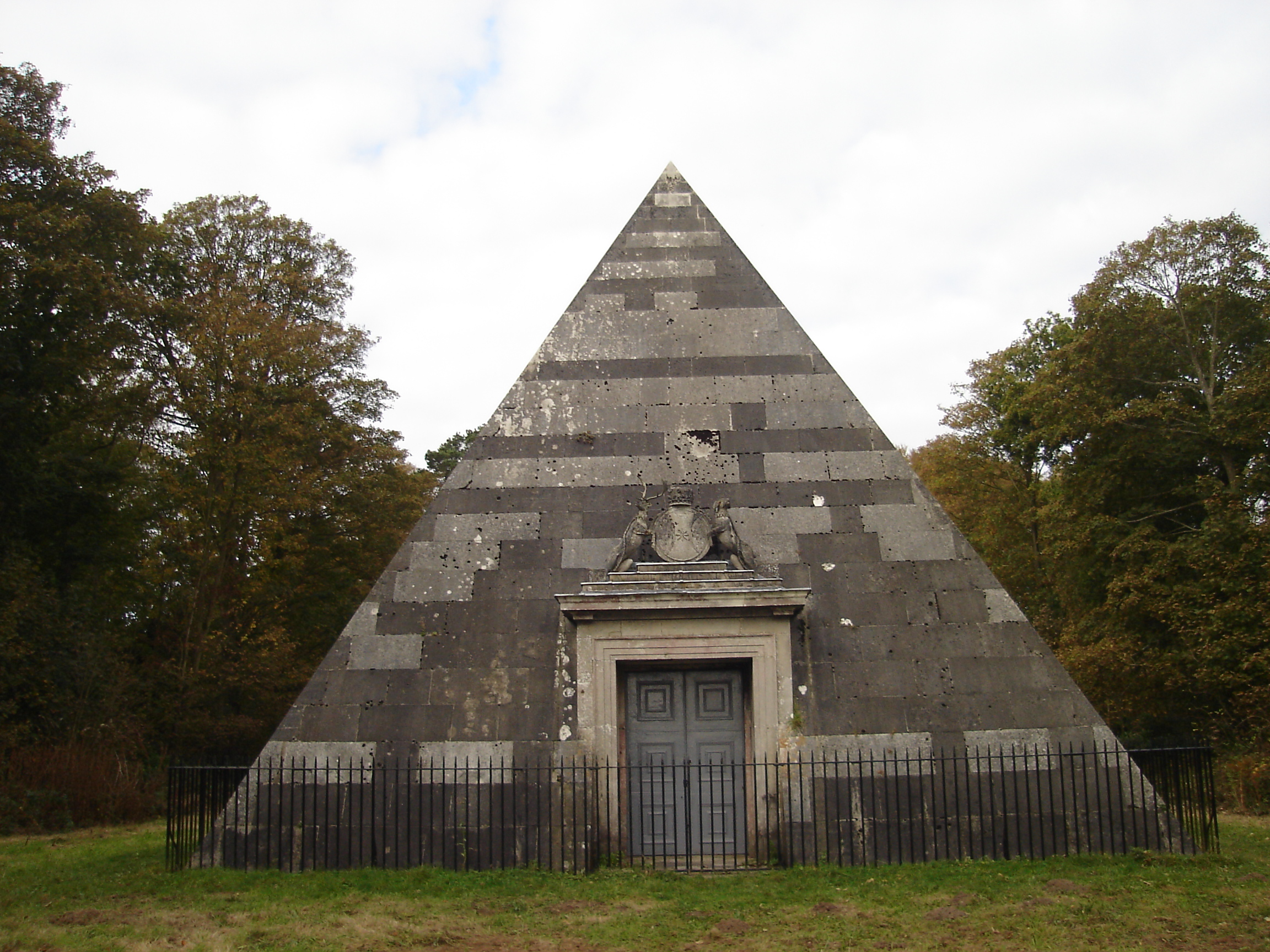
Blickling Park mausoleum in Norfolk

== Sources ==
- Concise Dictionary of National Biography

Parliament of the United Kingdom
Preceded by Thomas Vere; Horatio Walpole	Member of Parliament for Norwich; 1747–1756; With: Horatio Walpole 1747–1756; Edward Bacon 1756	Succeeded by Harbord Harbord
Political offices
Preceded by Earl of Hillsborough	Comptroller of the Household; 1756	Succeeded by Lord Edgcumbe
Preceded by Earl Harcourt	Lord Lieutenant of Ireland; 1776-80	Succeeded by Earl of Carlisle
Court offices
Preceded by New government	Lord of the Bedchamber; 1760–1767	Succeeded by The Duke of Roxburghe
Diplomatic posts
Preceded by Robert Murray Keith	Ambassador from the United Kingdom to Russia; 1762–1764	Succeeded by Earl Macartney
Peerage of Great Britain
Preceded by John Hobart	Earl of Buckinghamshire; 1756–1793	Succeeded by George Hobart
