= Amelia Stewart, Viscountess Castlereagh =

British noblewoman (1772–1829)

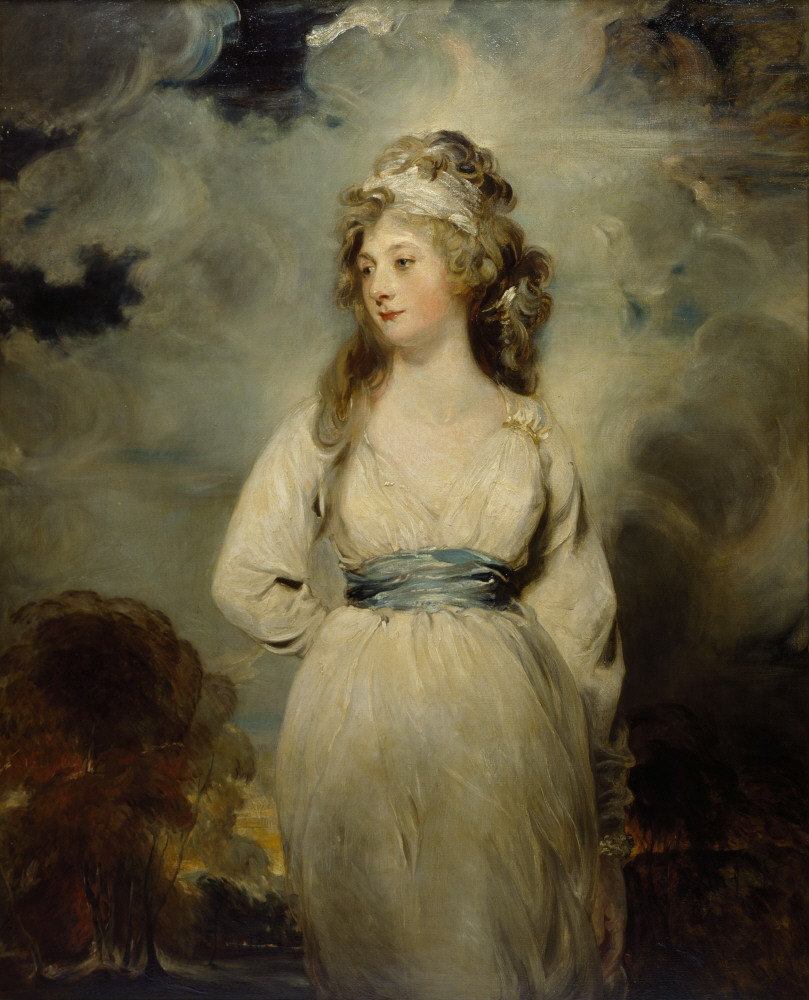
Amelia Anne Stewart, Marchioness of Londonderry, painted by Thomas Lawrence after her marriage in 1794

Amelia Anne Stewart, Marchioness of Londonderry (née Hobart; 20 February 1772 – 12 February 1829), nicknamed "Emily" and, from 1794 until 1821 generally known as Lady Castlereagh (UK: /ˈkɑːsəlreɪ/), was the wife of the Georgian-era Anglo-Irish statesman Robert Stewart, Viscount Castlereagh, who from 1812 to 1822 was British Foreign Secretary and Leader of the House of Commons. Well-connected by birth to the aristocracy and wife of a prominent politician who was Britain's leading diplomat during the close of the Napoleonic Wars, Lady Castlereagh was an influential member of Regency London's high society.

== Family ==
Lady Castlereagh was a daughter of John Hobart, 2nd Earl of Buckinghamshire and his second wife, Caroline Conolly. The Earl of Buckinghamshire was an English courtier and politician who served as British Ambassador to Russia (1762–65) and Lord Lieutenant of Ireland (1776–80).

Her maternal grandfather, William Conolly, was the nephew and heir of William Conolly, Speaker of the Irish House of Commons in the early 18th century and an extremely wealthy Irish landowner. Caroline's brother, Thomas Conolly, a noted Irish sportsman and Lady Castlereagh's uncle, was married to Louisa Lennox, daughter of Charles Lennox, 2nd Duke of Richmond, and one of the famous Lennox sisters. Caroline's mother, Anne Wentworth, was a daughter of Thomas Wentworth, 1st Earl of Strafford and Anne Johnson.

== Marriage ==
Amelia Anne Hobart, nicknamed "Emily", married Robert Stewart, son of the Irish politician and landowner Robert Stewart, 1st Marquess of Londonderry, in 1794. Her husband used his courtesy title, Viscount Castlereagh, from 1796 until 1821, when he succeeded to the marquessate on his father's death.

They were a notably devoted couple but had no children. They did, however, care for the young Frederick Stewart while his father, Charles, Lord Castlereagh's half-brother, was serving in the army.

Her devotion to her husband, combined with her love of foreign travel, well equipped Emily for the life of a diplomat's wife, and she was noted for her willingness to accompany her husband abroad, no matter how rigorous the journey. In Ireland, however, her sympathies did not always align with those of her husband.

== Wife of the Chief Secretary for Ireland ==
In the summer of 1798, when as Chief Secretary for Ireland her husband was contending with the United Irish rebellion, together with her sister Lady Elizabeth, then dying of tuberculosis, Lady Emily pleaded for the life of the Reverend William Porter. Porter had canvassed for her husband in County Down when he had stood as a "friend of reform" for the Irish Parliament in 1790, and had been a frequent visitor at Mount Stewart. However, he had strained relations with the Stewarts as the author of a popular and politically pointed satire of the County Down landed-interest Billy Bluff, serialised in the United Irish paper, the Northern Star. In February 1798, he asked his Presbyterian congregation, next to Mount Stewart, then under armed guard, and with tenants withholding rent, why Ireland was at war. It was, he observed: "in consequence of our connection with England", and maintained that a French invasion threatened only the government and not the people. Together with uncertain evidence of consorting with the rebels, this was sufficient to have Porter condemned for treason.

In the presence of Porter's wife, Lady Emily wrote to General Nugent pleading for mercy. But discovered by her husband, she was obliged to add a postscript: "L [Londonderry] does not allow me to interfere in Mr Porter's case. I cannot, therefore, and beg not to be mentioned. I only send the letter to gratify the humour" (i.e. to placate Mrs Porter). Porter was hung in front of his own church with, it was later claimed, Stewart tenants, by order, in attendance.

It is conceivable that she was influenced by her mother-in-law. Lady Londonderry, is reputed to have had a "strong but secret sympathy" for the United Irish cause evidenced in her friendship and correspondence with Jane Greg. As he suppressed the republican movement in Belfast and its hinterlands, General Lake had occasion to denounce Greg as "the most violent creature possible".

== Husband's suicide ==
Although there is no doubt that she was concerned by her husband's deteriorating mental condition, which culminated in his suicide in August 1822, she may not have realised quite how serious the matter was. In a private audience on 9 August, Castlereagh had told the King that police officers were searching for him, that he was being "accused of the same crime as the Bishop of Clogher." Percy Jocelyn, who had been defrocked the previous month, had been prosecuted for homosexuality. The King surmised that Castlereagh believed he was being blackmailed for the same reason, but also concluded he was unwell, and urged him to see a physician.

Meanwhile, Lady Emily was insisting, in public at least, that while he had been "unwell" her husband was expected to recover fully. During his last days, she was undoubtedly fully aware of his dangerous condition, but was forced to trust in the skill of their doctor, Charles Bankhead. Afterwards, she was blamed, perhaps unfairly, by many of his friends and political colleagues for concealing the serious nature of his mental illness: Lord Liverpool, the Prime Minister, in particular accused her of deceiving him about the extent of the problem.

== Last years ==
After her husband's death, Emily lived quietly in the country for almost two years. In 1824 she returned to her old social life, arousing the censure of some of her husband's friends who thought her conduct unfeeling. However her health soon failed and she died in 1829.

== Social leader ==
During the Regency of George IV, Lady Castlereagh, along with Lady Jersey, Dorothea Lieven, Lady Cowper, and others, was a Lady Patroness of Almack's, one of the first and most exclusive mixed-gender social clubs in London. In their role as Patroness, they had great influence over the ton, determining social acceptance by designating who might receive "vouchers" (entrance tickets) to Almack's, thereby setting and enforcing complex, unwritten social codes of the London social elite.

Credited with having introduced the quadrille to London, Lady Castlereagh is also remembered for having Almack's doors closed, without exception, at eleven o'clock, even once turning away the Duke of Wellington. Her own parties were considered dull, and her manner was somewhat eccentric: guests described her conversation as an endless flow of trivial information delivered in an oddly detached manner. Despite her frivolous manner, she had been well-educated, and had a passion for literature and music.

At their country home, Woollet Hall, North Cray, Lady Castlereagh kept a private zoo, which featured antelopes, ostriches, kangaroos, and a notably bad-tempered tiger.

Lady Castlereagh is often mentioned in Regency novels, most famously in Georgette Heyer's Regency romances.
