= Joseph Bonomi the Elder =

Italian architect and draughtsman (1739–1808)

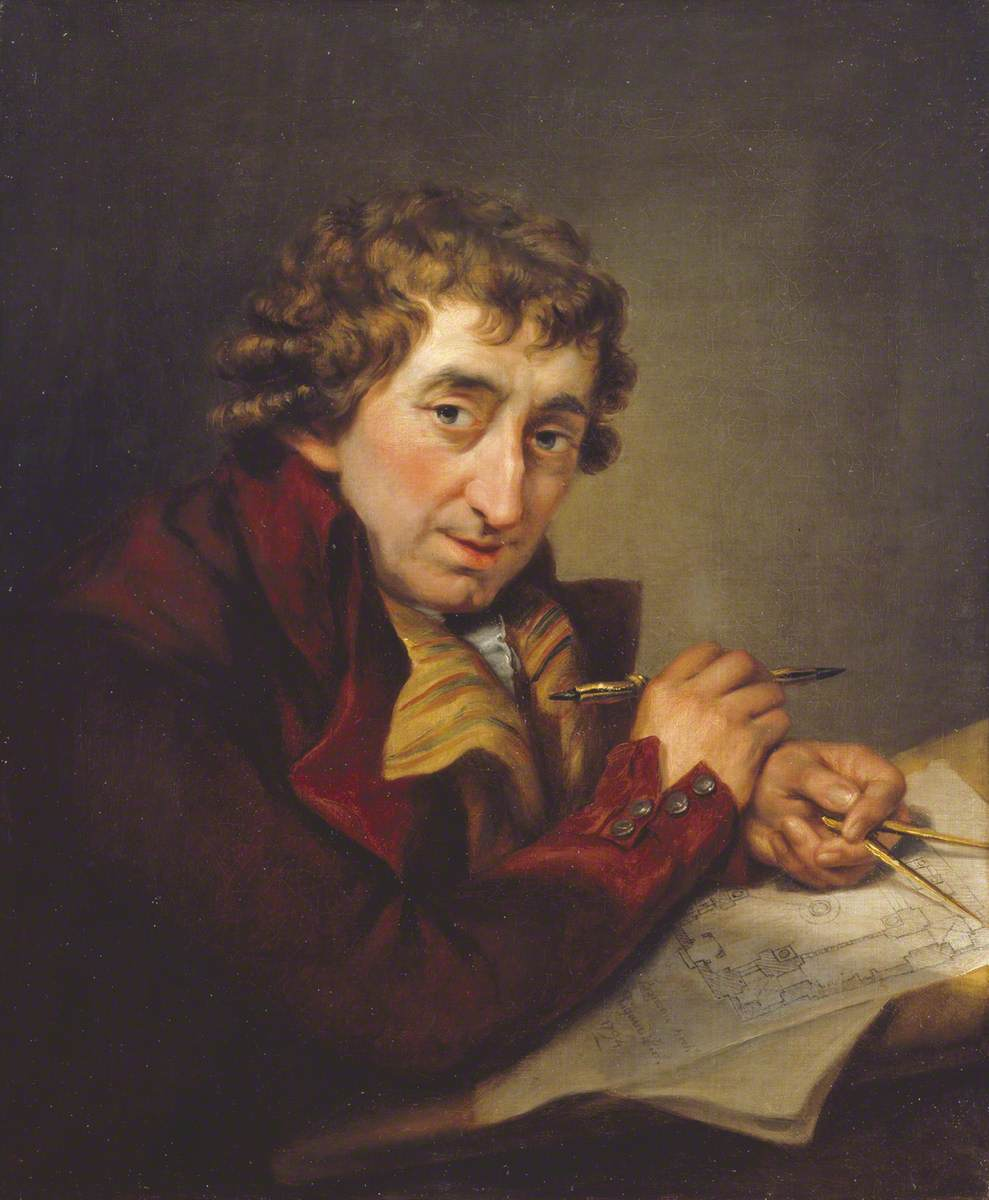
Painting of Joseph Bonomi the Elder by John Francis Rigaud. Housed at Royal Academy of Arts

Joseph Bonomi the Elder ARA (19 January 1739 – 9 March 1808) was an Italian architect and draughtsman who spent most of his career in England where he became a successful designer of country houses. Bonomi was Robert Adam’s leading draughtsman.

== Biography ==
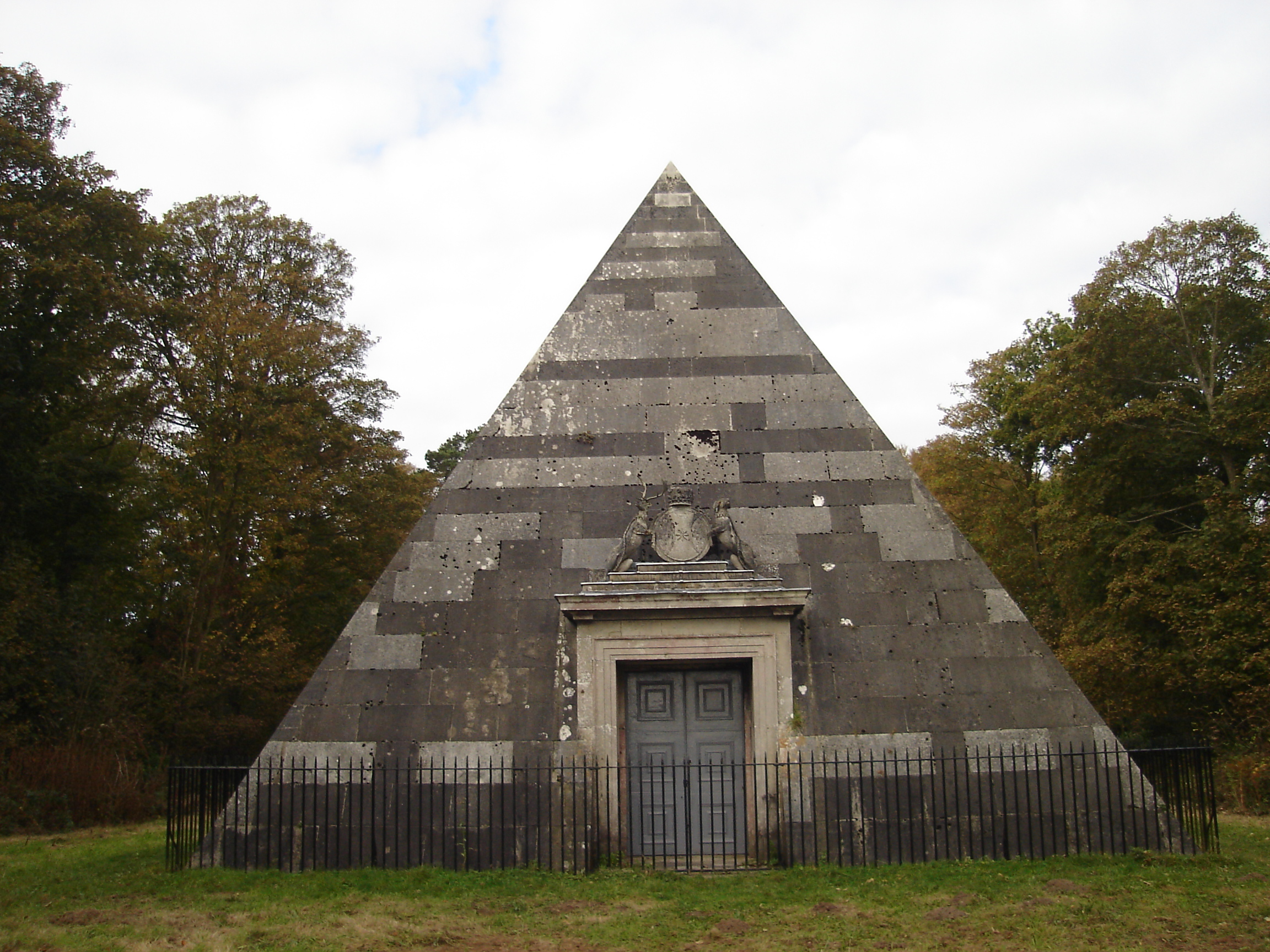
The Blickling pyramid

He was born Giuseppe Bonomi in Rome on 19 January 1739. He was educated at the Roman College and then studied architecture with Gerolamo Theodoli. He made his early reputation in Rome before moving to London in 1767 at the invitation of Robert and James Adam, who employed him as a draughtsman from 1768. In his early years in England Bonomi also worked as an assistant to Thomas Leverton.

He became a close friend of the painter Angelica Kauffman, whose cousin Rosa Florini he married in 1775. The next year he produced a design for a proposed sacristy for St. Peter's Basilica in Rome, which may indicate that he visited his native city at around this time. In 1783 Kauffman persuaded Bonomi to move back to Rome, where she was now living. He took his wife and children with him, and the move seems to have been intended to be permanent; however the next year the family returned to London, where Bonomi was to remain based for the rest of his life.

Bonomi's earliest known independent work dates from 1784. After this he quickly became a successful designer of country houses. In 1789, he was elected an Associate of the Royal Academy, and from then on constantly exhibited architectural drawings. Joshua Reynolds, president of the Academy, had wanted Bonomi to become a full Academician, regarding him as a suitable candidate for the vacant chair of perspective; the majority of the Academicians were, however, opposed to this suggestion, and Bonomi became an associate only, and that merely through the president's deciding vote. Reynolds resigned his presidency in protest, but was soon re-elected.

In 1804 he was appointed architect of St. Peter's at Rome, apparently as an honorary position.

He died in London on 9 March 1808, aged 69, and was buried in the Marylebone Cemetery.

== Family ==
In 1775 he married Rosa Florini, Angelica Kauffman's cousin. One son Ignatius Bonomi (1787–1870), was also an architect, and another, Joseph Bonomi the Younger (1796–1878), became an eminent sculptor, artist, Egyptologist, and curator. Bonomi the Younger also trained and practiced as an architect. He also had a daughter Mary Anne who later married the York doctor George Goldie. Their son, also named George, became an architect of Catholic churches largely in the gothic style. These included the York Oratory.

== Architectural style ==
In a paper read at the Royal Institute of British Architects in 1869, Wyatt Papworth summarised Bonomi's approach:

The style adopted by him was the Italian or modernised Roman; and he sought to obtain the characteristic effect appropriate to the object of his design, rather by just proportions and good details than by unnecessary ornamentation and littleness of parts, thus exhibiting his preference for the "Architecturesque" over the "Picturesque."

He took a bold approach to Classical architecture, and was prepared to break its accepted rules by, for instance, omitting the frieze from an entablature, or supporting a portico on an odd number of columns. A favourite innovation was to project the main portico of a house deep enough to form a porte cochère (i.e. a shelter for carriages ).

== Works ==
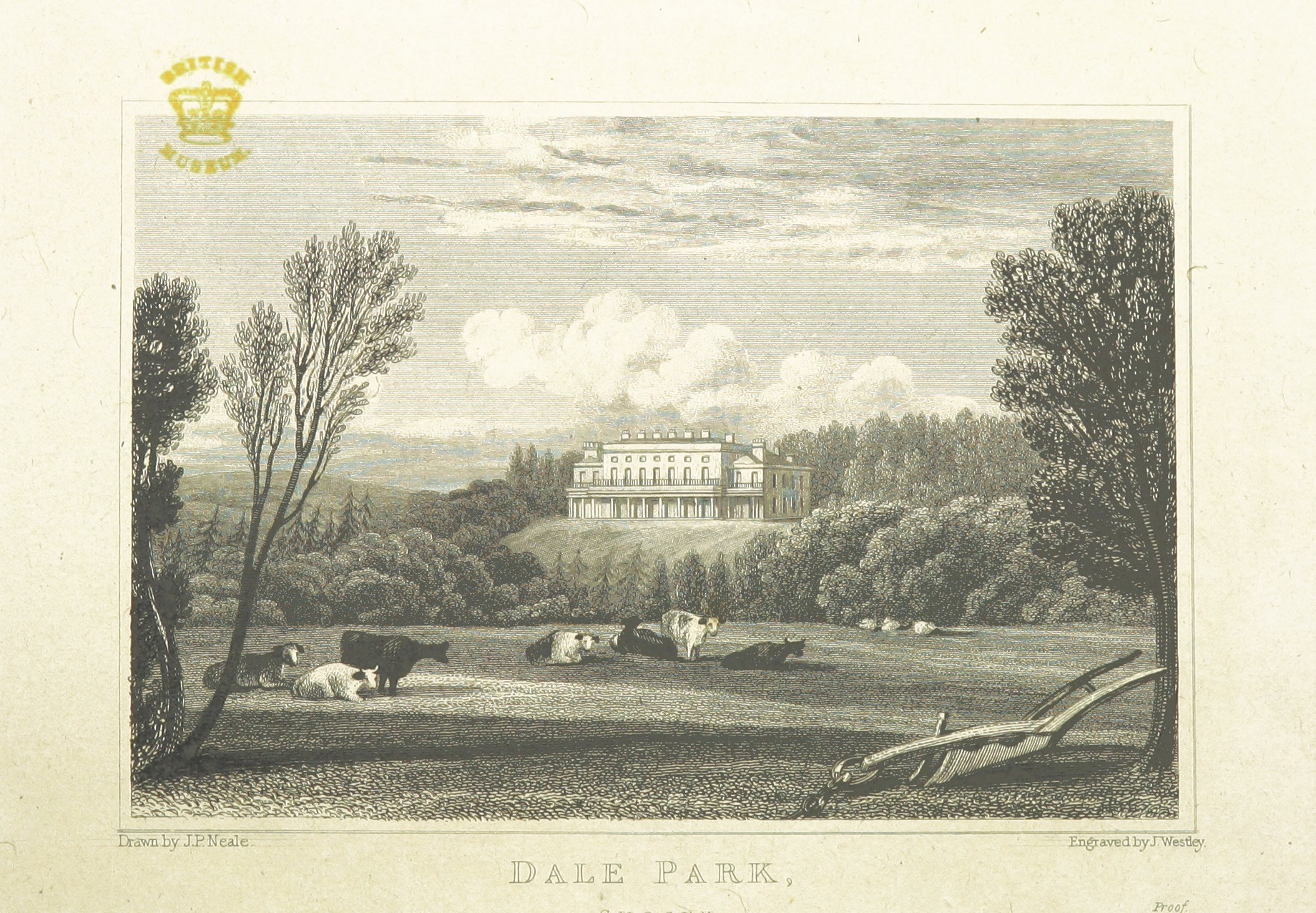
Dale Park

Notable works include:

- Dale Park, Madehurst, Sussex (1784). Demolished 1959.
- Parts of Towneley Hall near Burnley in Lancashire.
- Barrells Hall, near Ullenhall, Henley in Arden Warwickshire, home of Lady Luxborough and the Newton family of Glencripesdale Estate, Argyll.
- Gallery at Packington Hall, Great Packington, Warwickshire, for Heneage Finch, 4th Earl of Aylesford.
- St James' Church, Great Packington, Warwickshire (1789–92).
- Saloon for Lady Montagu's house in Portman Square, London (1790). Destroyed 1941
- Eastwell House, Kent, for George Finch Hatton (1793-9).
- London, The Spanish Chapel, Manchester Square (1793-6; demolished 1880) replaced by St James's, Spanish Place
- Pyramidal mausoleum at Blickling Park, Norfolk in memory of John Hobart, 2nd Earl of Buckinghamshire.
- Saloon and staircase at Piercefield House, Monmouthshire.
- Remodelling of Stansted Park, Sussex (with James Wyatt).
- Alterations to Hatchlands Park, near Guildford, Surrey.
- Church of Our Lady of the Assumption and St Gregory, London (1789–90).
- Laverstoke House, Laverstoke, Hampshire (1798).
- Sections of Lambton Castle, near Washington, County Durham (1798–1802). The castle was further enlarged by Bonomi's son Ignatius.
- Longford Hall, Shropshire.
- Rosneath House, Dunbartonshire, for George Campbell, 6th Duke of Argyll (1803–06). Demolished 1961.

== In literature ==
Bonomi is briefly mentioned in Sense and Sensibility by Jane Austen. In the novel, Robert Ferrars says to Elinor Dashwood (perhaps untruthfully) that his friend Lord Courtland had shown him three house designs by Bonomi and asked him to choose between them, but that Robert had burned them and advised Courtland to build a cottage instead.
