= Blickling Park mausoleum =

Building in Norfolk, England

Coordinates: 52°49′09.0″N 1°12′48.2″E

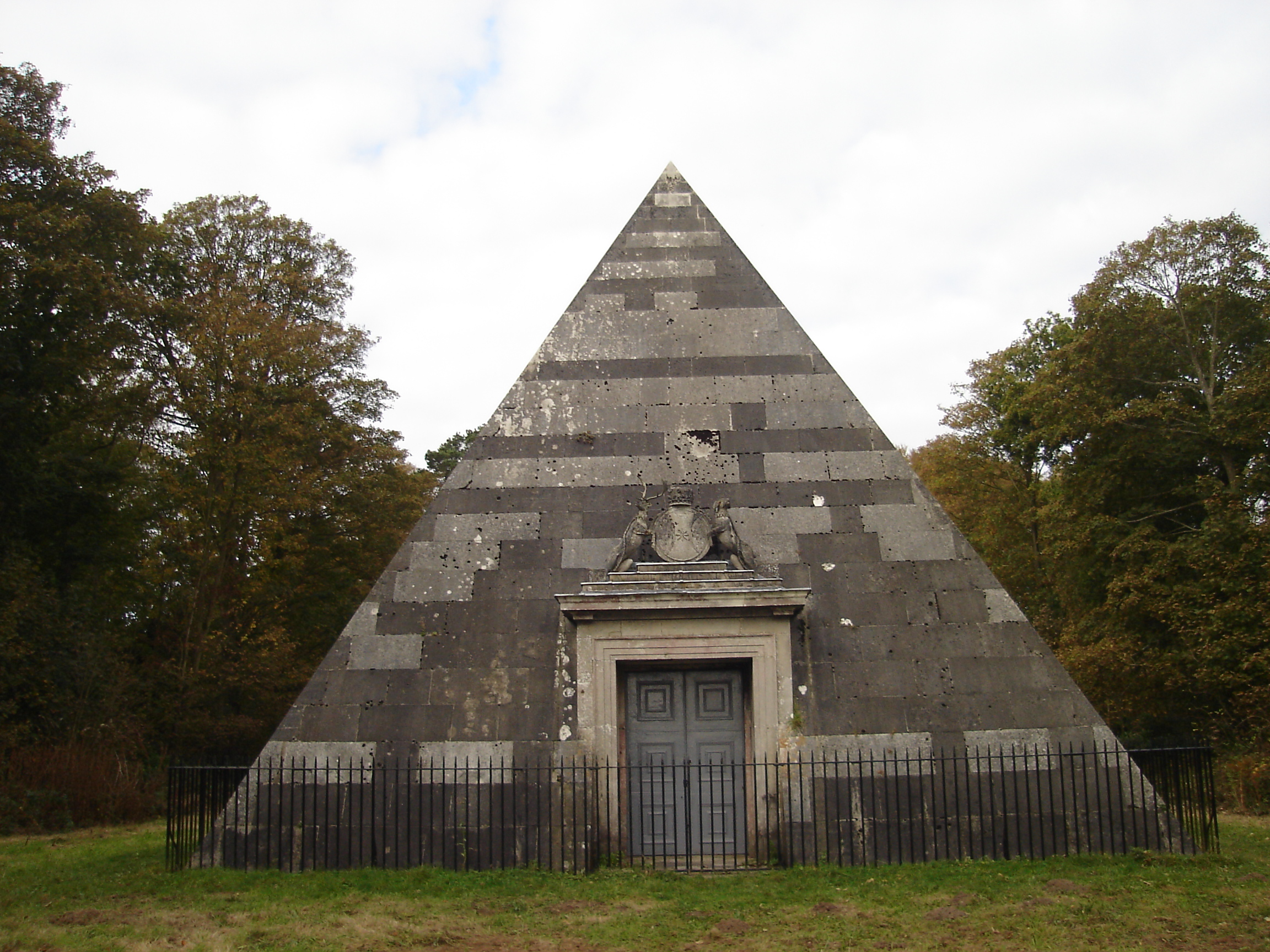
Front elevation of the mausoleum

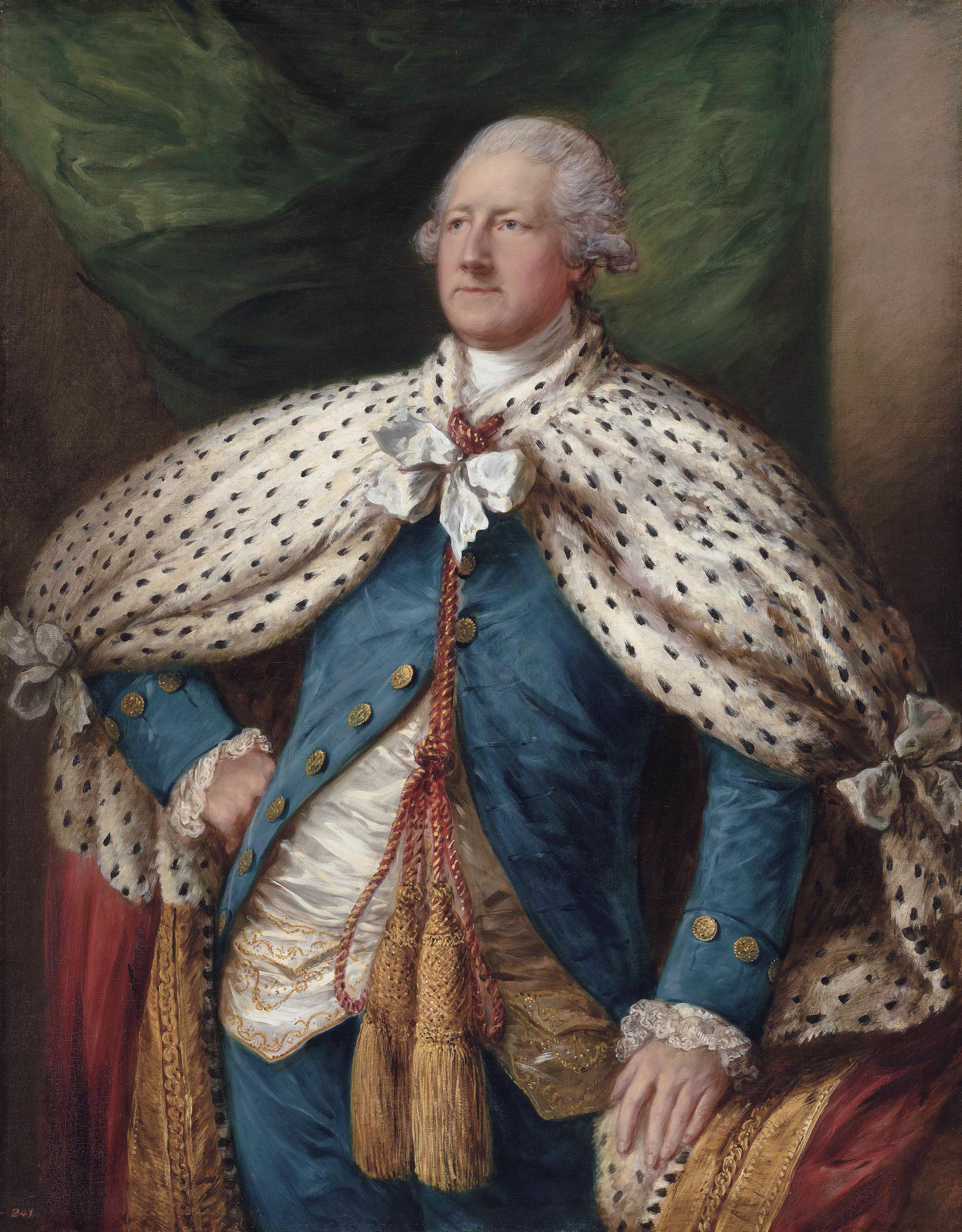
John Hobart, 2nd Earl of Buckinghamshire

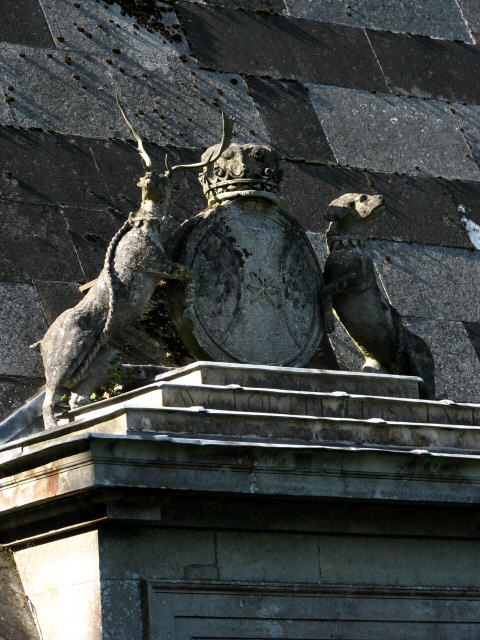
Detail of Hobart coat of arms above entrance

The Blickling Park mausoleum is a Grade II* listed building in Blickling Hall, Norfolk, England. It was commissioned in 1793 by Lady Caroline Suffield, the daughter of John Hobart, 2nd Earl of Buckinghamshire, as a tomb for her father and his two wives. The Italian architect Joseph Bonomi the Elder designed the structure, which Henry Wood built. It is in the form of a pyramid, modelled on that of Cestius in Rome as an early example of Egyptian Revival architecture. The structure is now owned by the National Trust.

== Design and construction ==
The mausoleum was commissioned by Lady Caroline (wife of William Harbord, 2nd Baron Suffield), the eldest daughter of John Hobart, 2nd Earl of Buckinghamshire, in memory of her father, who died in 1793. Caroline, who inherited her father's estate, Blickling Hall, commissioned the Italian architect Joseph Bonomi the Elder to design the structure. In an early example of Egyptian Revival architecture, Bonomi designed a mausoleum based on the ancient Pyramid of Cestius in Rome. Bonomi exhibited his design drawings at the Royal Academy of Arts, which are now stored in Blickling Hall. The structure was erected between 1794 and 1796.

The structure is a square-based pyramid constructed from more than 190,000 Portland stone blocks, that were finished on site by the builder, Henry Wood. When constructed, the stone was white but has since weathered to varying shades of grey. The pyramid measures 45 feet (14 m) square in plan and is sited on an avenue of yews, on the edge of an ancient woodland around 1 mile (1.6 km) from the hall. The east face of the pyramid contains a central doorway surrounded by an architrave and surmounted with an entablature. The entablature is engraved with the Hobart family motto, auctor pretiosa facit (Latin: "the giver makes the gift precious"). Atop the entablature is a carved depiction of the Hobart arms, crowned and supported by a hound and a stag. The panelled door has two leaves, weighing 500 kilograms (1,100 lb).

The north and south faces have a central, square window opening with moulded stone architrave. The west face contains a memorial panel with an architrave. The panel notes that the structure was erected in memory of Hobart by his widow and Harbord. A carved stone bull surmounts the panel. The bull is a symbol associated with the Hobart family and stems from a desire to associate themselves with Anne Boleyn, whose childhood home was Blickling and whose family symbol was a bull.

The interior of the mausoleum is a single chamber used as a chapel. It has a domed vaulted roof with a dentilled cornice. The chamber has eight recesses, one is used for the door and two for the windows, the recesses in between these are used for wall-mounted memorials, and the final three recesses (which face the entrance) contain tombs for Hobart, his first wife Mary Anne and his second wife Caroline. The tombs are in the form of marble sarcophagi raised on plinths. The floor is paved in marble.

== Later history ==
In 1806, Edmund Bartell described the mausoleum in his Guide to Cromer: "Its situation is very happily chosen amid a large and venerable wood, whose solitude appears only to be broken by the prying curiosity of the stranger, or the footsteps of the nimble deer". Through Caroline's marriage to Suffield, the Blickling estate came into the possession of the Kerr family. It was bequeathed to the National Trust by Philip Kerr, 11th Marquess of Lothian, in 1940. At some stage, iron railings were added around the structure's perimeter.

The mausoleum became a listed building on 19 January 1952 and now holds a Grade II* listing. The interior was described as being in a very poor condition in 1978, and in 2002, the structure was noted to be subject to occasional vandalism. The National Trust, which describes the mausoleum as "one of Blickling’s most iconic landmarks", is fundraising for repairs to the structure, to include replacement of the worn door hinges.

== Gallery ==
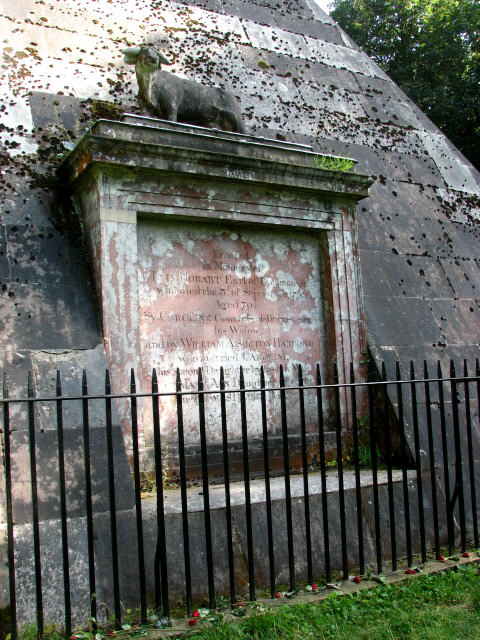
Detail of memorial plaque

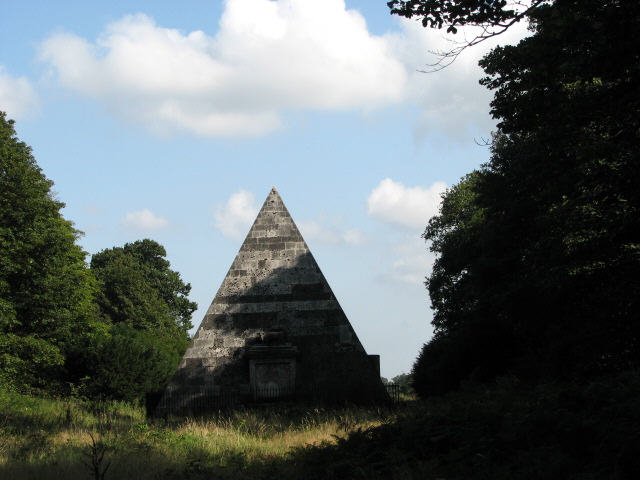
Rear elevation

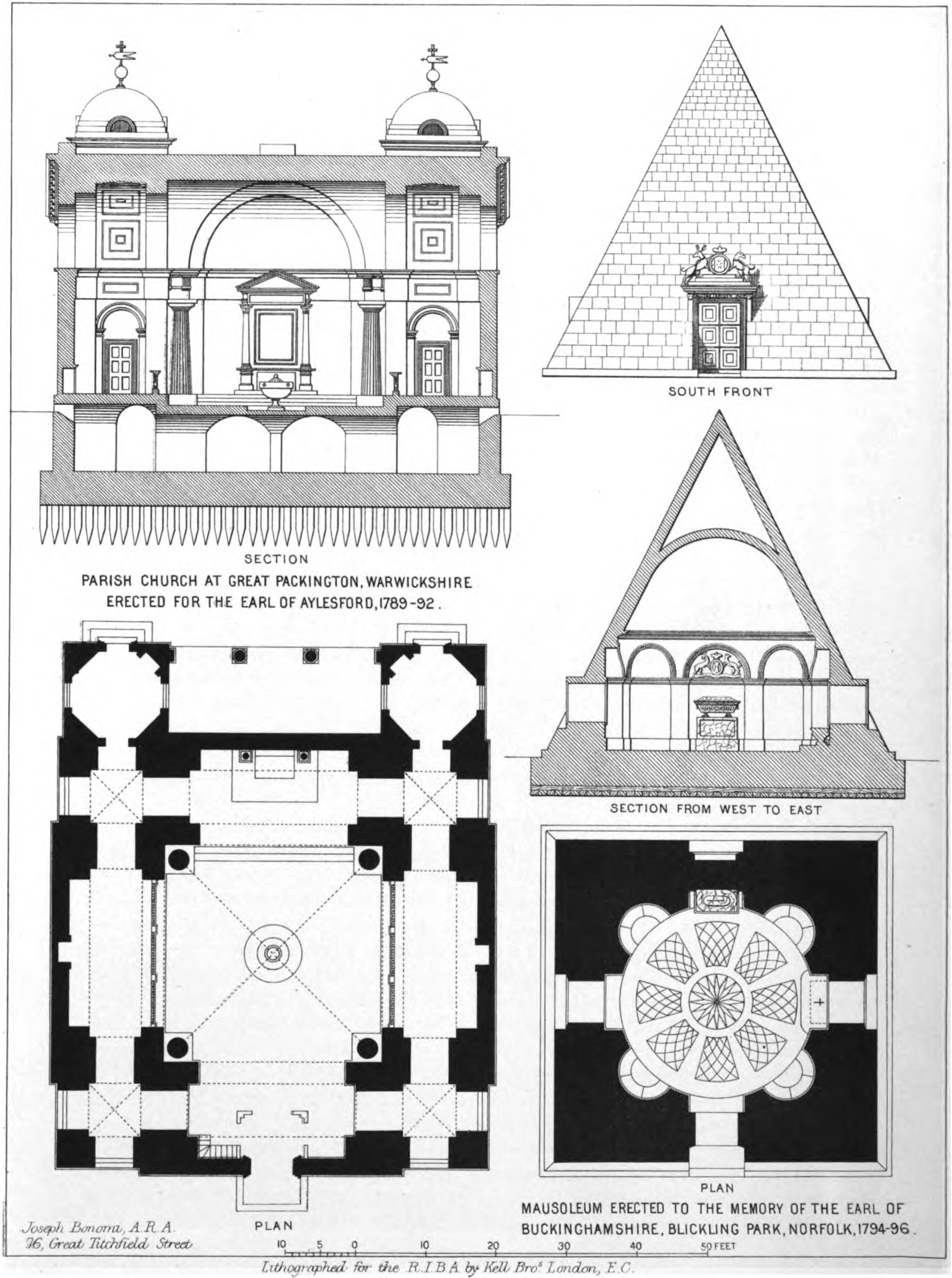
Bonomi's plans for St James' Church, Great Packington (left) and the mausoleum (right)
