= St James's, Spanish Place =

St James' Church
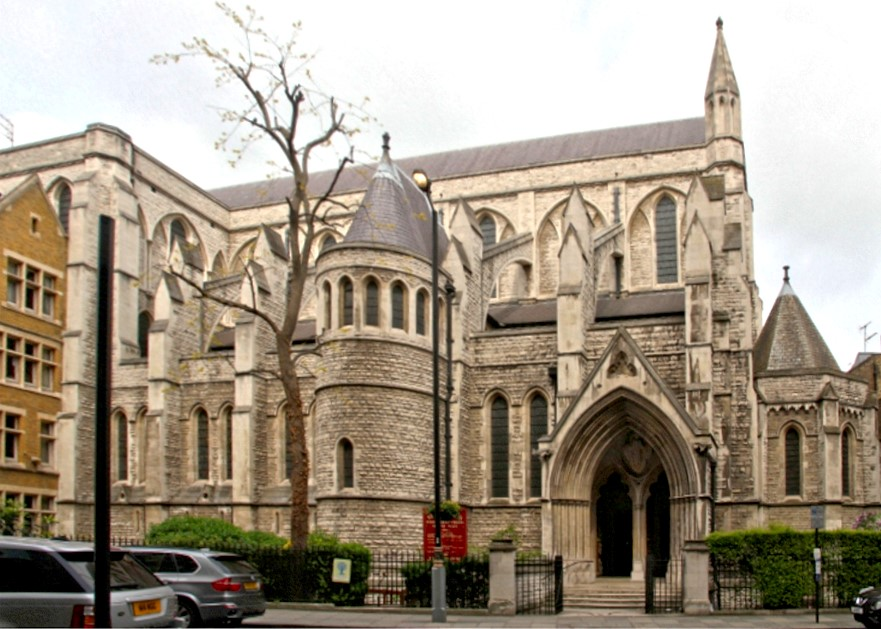
- St James' Church
- 51°31′5″N 0°9′9″W
- OS grid reference: TQ 28280 81539
- Location: London, W1
- Country: England
- Denomination: Catholic
- Website: www.sjrcc.org.uk

History
- Dedication: Saint James the Greater and Saint Anne
- Consecrated: 1949

Architecture
- Heritage designation: Grade II*
- Architect: Edward Goldie
- Style: Neo-Gothic
- Completed: 1890

Specifications
- Capacity: 800
- Length: 195 feet
- Width: 92 feet
- Height: 67 feet
- Materials: Stone and marble

Administration
- Province: Westminster
- Archdiocese: Westminster

Clergy
- Archbishop: Vincent Cardinal Nichols
- Rector: Mgr Philip Whitmore

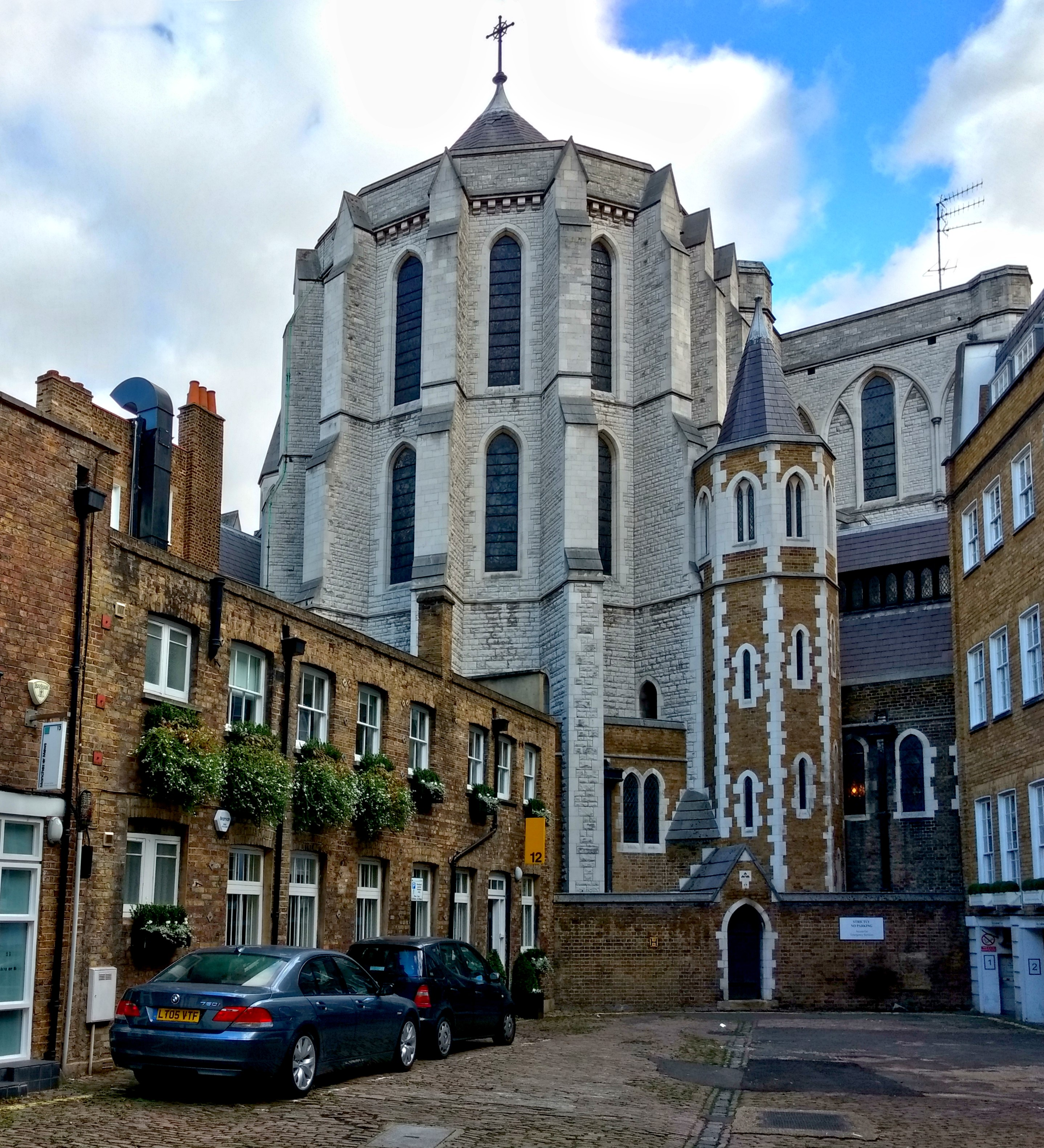
Seen from Manchester Mews

St James' Church is a large English Gothic Catholic church in George Street, Marylebone, London. Although currently situated in George Street, the church maintains its connection with Spanish Place, the road opposite the current church, because of its historic connection with the Spanish Embassy. It is a Grade II* listed building.

== Site ==
The church is located in George Street, Marylebone, behind the Wallace Collection and close to Marylebone High Street.

== History ==
Cross of St. James, badge of the Order of Santiago.

In the reign of Elizabeth I the Bishops of Ely let their palace and chapel in Ely Place to the Spanish Ambassador and, until the reign of Charles I, it was occupied by the High Representative of the Court of Spain. During this period the chapel (now St Etheldreda's Church) was freely used by English Catholics and became a sanctuary to some degree for them, in a manner typical of an embassy chapel.

After the restoration of Charles II the Spanish Embassy was re-established in London, first on Ormond Street and then at Hertford House, Manchester Square, where the Wallace Collection is now housed. Here, in 1793–1796, shortly after the Roman Catholic Relief Act 1791 repealed some of the laws affecting Catholic worship, a chapel was built to designs by Joseph Bonomi on the corner of Spanish Place and Charles Street (now George Street), largely through the efforts of Thomas Hussey, chaplain at the embassy. Most of the objects of piety in the present church are legacies from this older building. In 1827 the official Spanish connection with the chapel ceased and it was handed over to the London Vicariate.

However, there is much in the present church of its Spanish heritage including Alfonso XIII's personal standard which is in a frame over the sacristy door. Besides, Spanish Place has been established and maintained historically By Spain. An unofficial connection with the Embassy of Spain has continued with the Church of St James today.

A recurring anxiety from 1827 was that the chapel was on leasehold property and the lease was not renewable. Funds were raised with a view to purchasing a site and building a new church, but as the neighbourhood was almost entirely divided up into large estates, it seemed impossible to find a site anywhere near the old chapel. One tradition has it, however, that the Rector towards the end of the lease, Canon William Barry, had a great devotion to the Holy Souls and he promised a hundred Masses for their repose in petition for a site. Soon after he had redeemed his promise the site of the present church, immediately opposite the old chapel, came up for sale at £30,000, the exact sum which Barry and his predecessors had collected towards a new church. The site was purchased and the design for a new church was made an open competition. Edward Goldie, great-grandson of the architect of the old chapel, Signor Joseph Bonomi, won the competition and the present edifice, partially completed, was opened on Michaelmas Day (29 September) 1890. The first Solemn High Mass was celebrated by The Very Reverend and Honourable Algernon Stanley PA, with Fr William Lockhark preaching in place of Cardinal Manning; it attended by the Spanish ambassador and staff, as well as a number of English Catholic bishops.

One of the requirements for a church to be consecrated is for all of the debts incurred in its construction and the purchase of the land it is built upon to have been repaid. As such, the church was consecrated on 28 July 1949 by Bishop George Craven: a rare privilege for at that time he was parish priest and rector, and thus consecrated his own church. The consecration had been planned on two previous occasions but had had to be postponed – in 1935 because of the death of Cardinal Francis Bourne, and in 1940 because of the Second World War. Most of the archives of the old Spanish Chapel have gone to Spain, but there are preserved in the Church both baptismal and marriage Registers dating back to 1732.

A requiem mass was held at St James's for the King of Portugal Carlos I on 15 February 1908. The mass was attended by Edward VII and Queen Alexandra. This was the first Catholic mass attended by a British monarch since James II.

== Architecture ==
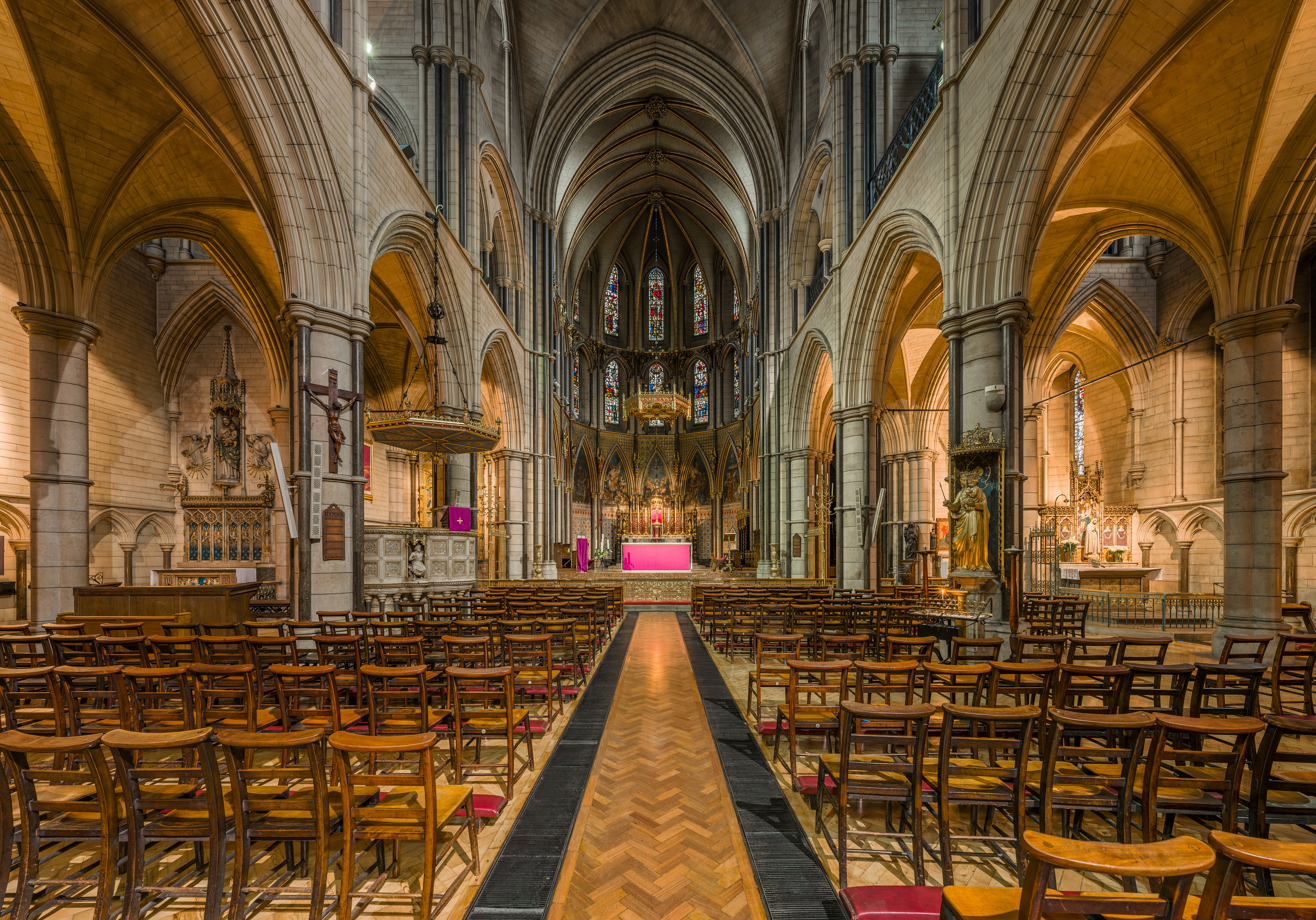
The interior of the church

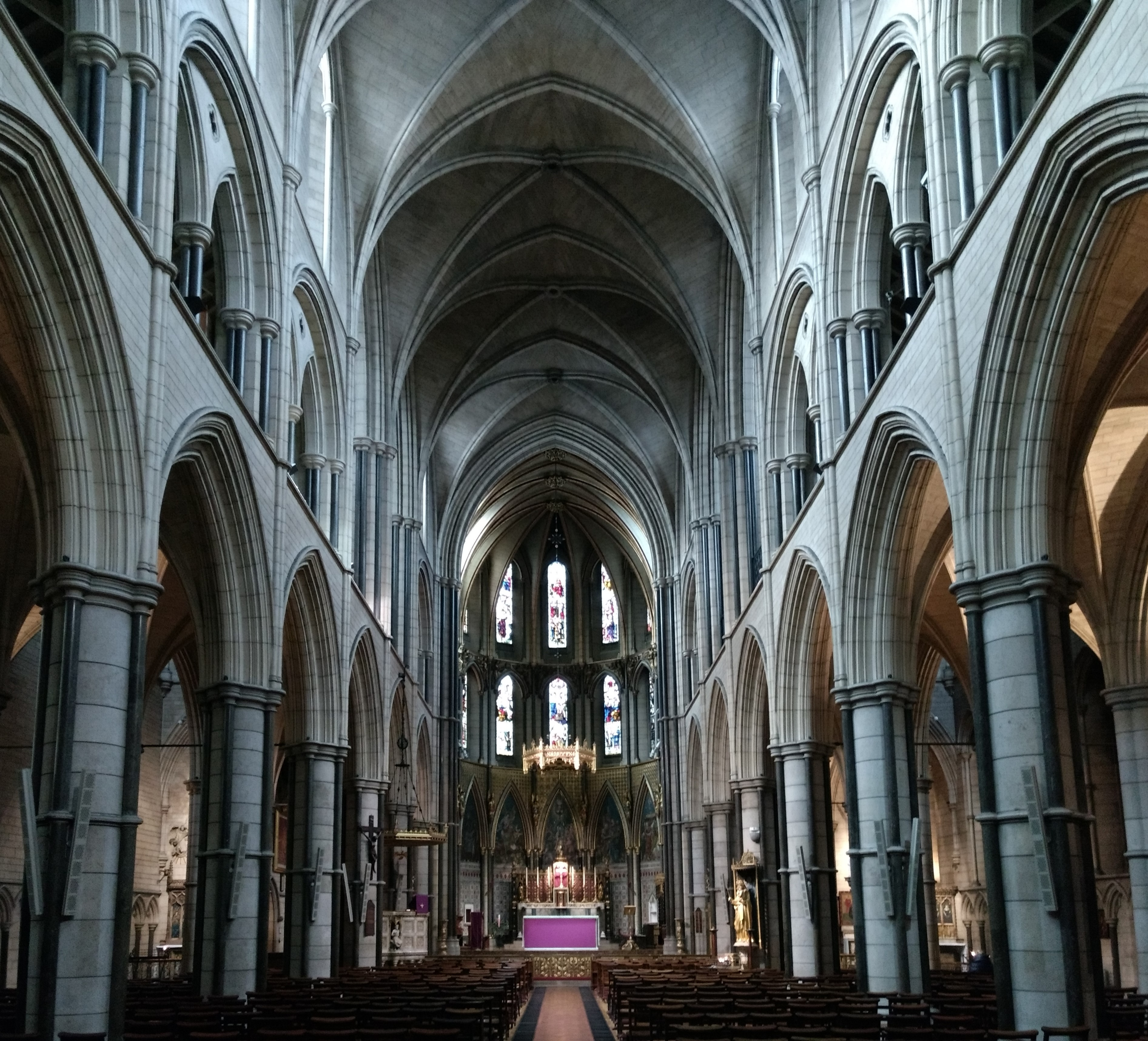
Alternate interior view.

The church is of early Gothic design. Built entirely of stone it has a purity of line that confers a true sense of majesty, especially in its height, upon the whole building. The arches of the nave are supported by pillars enriched with marble colonettes. As the groining is artistically so perfect nowhere does the weight of stone produce a feeling of oppressiveness. The church entrance in George Street is a copy of the main entrance to Lichfield Cathedral while throughout the church are many details taken from the best type of the English 13th century Gothic style as exemplified, for instance, at Salisbury Cathedral and in parts of Westminster Abbey.

The Gothic chancel is one of the most artistic in London, with a high arch rising to the groined roof of the nave (yet in contrast to the nave which is manifestly English Gothic), and is at once reminiscent of the finest French cathedrals. The apse is heptagonal and has in its lower half seven pointed arches filled with opus sectile. The centre panel portrays the descent of the Holy Spirit upon Our Lady and the Apostles while the other six contain symbols of sacrificial and sacramental aspects of the Holy Eucharist, taken from the Old Testament. High on the wall above the choir stalls can be seen two built-in gilt crowns. It was beneath these that places were always given to King Alfonso and Queen Ena of Spain when they attended the church. In the canopied niches at the ends are gilt bronze statues, on one side St James, on the other St Anne. Above is a gilt hexagonal canopy and suspended behind this is a corona of rock crystals which is lowered over the monstrance during Benediction and Exposition of the Blessed Sacrament. The sanctuary floor is golden mosaic.

High on the wall on the epistle (Blandford Street) side of the church is the large marble statue of Saint James the Greater, Patron of the Church. Besides the sword and palm that symbolize his martyrdom, he carries the staff and bread wallet of the pilgrim. Across from the statue, towards the centre of the church, stands the statue of Our Lady, Queen of Heaven. It is completely covered with gold leaf except for the shoes which are red. It was made locally by a stonemason in 1840 and is reputed to be the second statue to be erected in a London church after the Reformation. The church is orientated contrary to usual church building practice. Traditionally churches are constructed facing east, such that during the celebration of the morning liturgy the priest and congregation face towards the rising sun, a symbol of Christ and the Second Coming.

== Liturgy ==
Vatican banner.

Mass is celebrated in the church on Sundays and major feast days as a solemn Mass in Latin with full professional choir and accompanying organ in a combination of polyphony and Gregorian chant. This is supplemented by the occasional celebration of Solemn Vespers which enriches the liturgical cycle of the parish. On those days Mass is also celebrated several times in English and once as a Low Mass in the 1962 Roman Missal form. The church has a particular charism in relation to the Sacrament of Confession which is offered daily at set times. Other devotions contribute to the liturgical life of the parish, such as Holy Hours and Benediction, the recitation of the Rosary, and the Stations of the Cross.

== Organ ==
The organ, situated in the triforium above the sanctuary, was built in 1922 by A. Hunter & Son of Clapham, London. Because of the striking and unusual acoustics of the building, it was voiced by the builder in the church and remains today exactly in its original tonal design. Hunter built a number of very fine instruments throughout the country but the one in St James's is regarded by organists and organ builders as the finest example of his superb craftsmanship. Five ranks of pipes were retained from the Gray & Davison organ (previously by the famous eighteenth century builder, Samuel Green) originally in the Spanish Chapel. The present organ has fifty-three stops on three manuals and pedals. Wind pressures are from three and a half inches for flue-work to ten inches for the heavy reed. A full specification can be found on NPOR.

== Transport connections ==
| Service | Station/stop | Lines/routes served | Distance from St. James's |
|---|---|---|---|
| London Buses | George Street | 2, 13, 74, 139, 274 | 200yds |
| London Underground | Baker Street | Bakerloo line Circle line Hammersmith & City line Jubilee line Metropolitan line | 500yds |
| London Underground | Bond Street | Central line Jubilee line | 450yds |

== See also ==
- St James the Greater
- St. James' Church (disambiguation)
- Embassy chapel
- St Etheldreda's Church, London
- Church of Our Lady of the Assumption and St Gregory
- Sardinian Embassy Chapel

== Sources ==
- Schofield, Nicholas. (2005) The Church of St James, Spanish Place: A History and Guide, The Bindall Press Ltd.
