= Church of St Anselm and St Cecilia =

Church in Holborn, London, England

Coordinates: 51.516706°N 0.119315°W

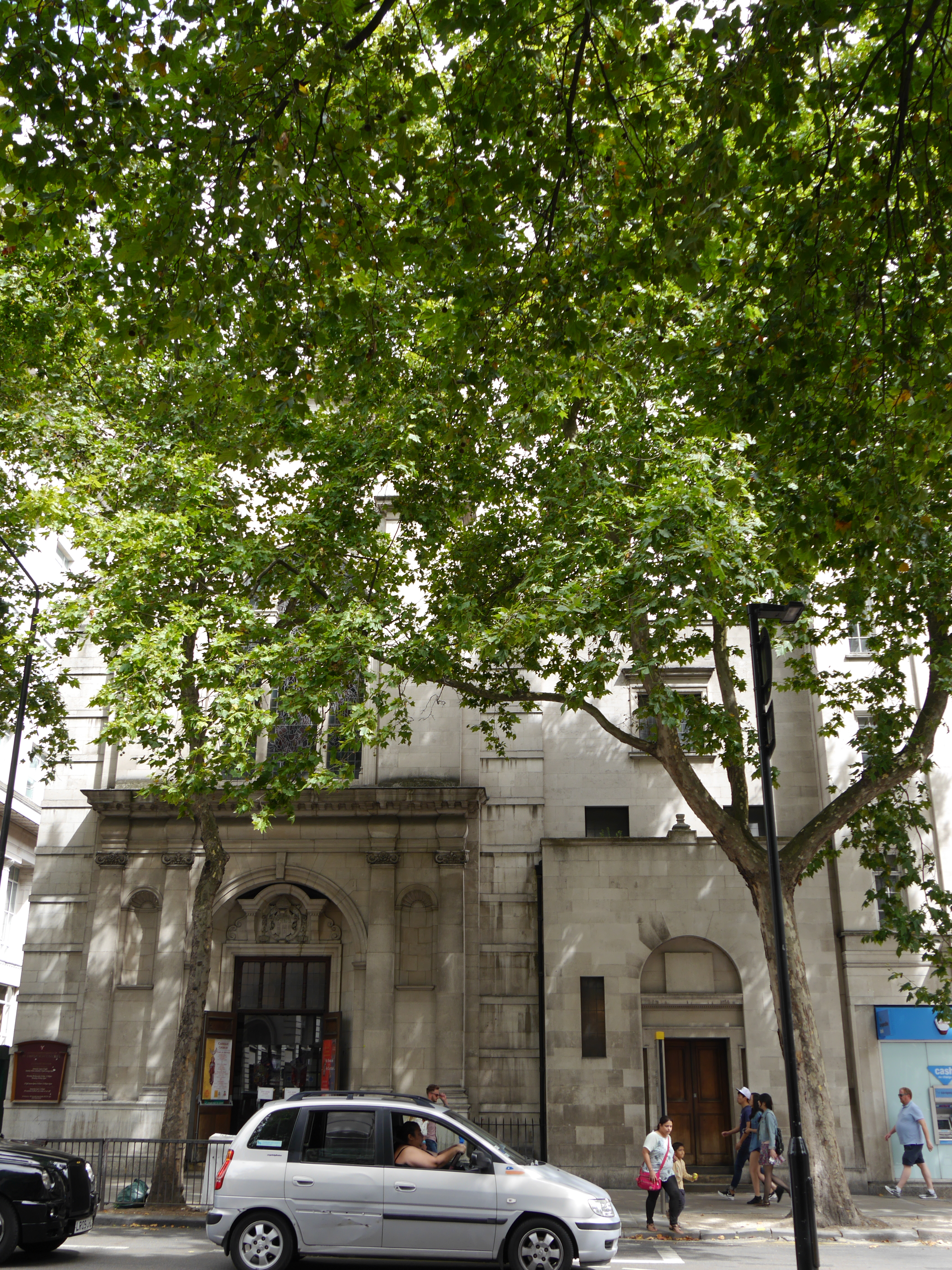
Church of St Anselm and St Cecilia, 2015

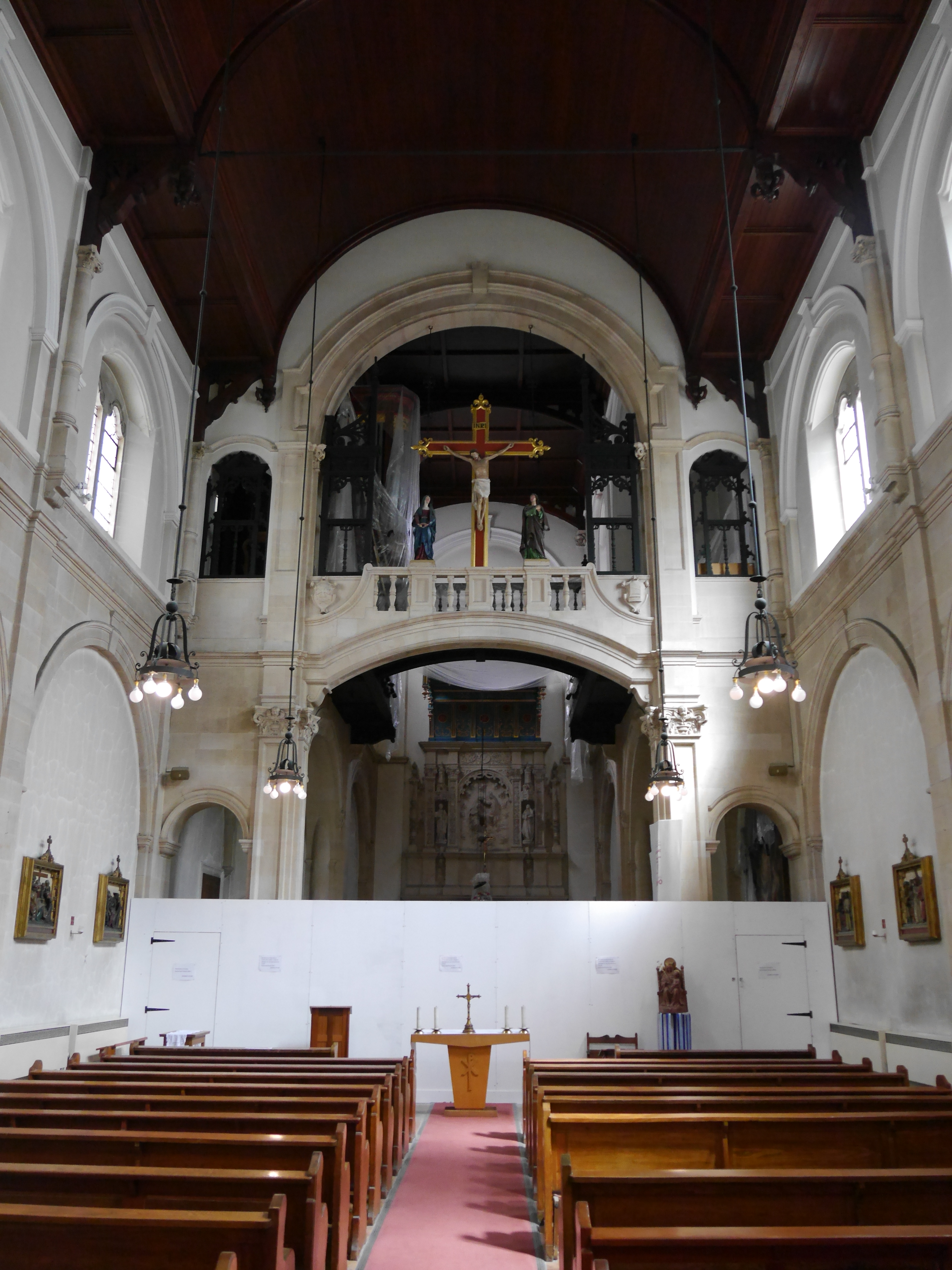
Interior, 2015

The Church of St Anselm and St Cecilia is a Roman Catholic church at 70 Lincoln's Inn Fields, Holborn, London.

It was built in about 1909, designed by Frederick Walters to replace the Sardinian Embassy Chapel which was demolished in order to make way for Kingsway. The church has been Grade II listed since 1974. The south aisle was added in about 1953, designed by Stanley Kerr Bate, and the façade was rebuilt at that time.
