= Sardinian Embassy Chapel =

Coordinates: 51°30′55″N 0°7′8″W

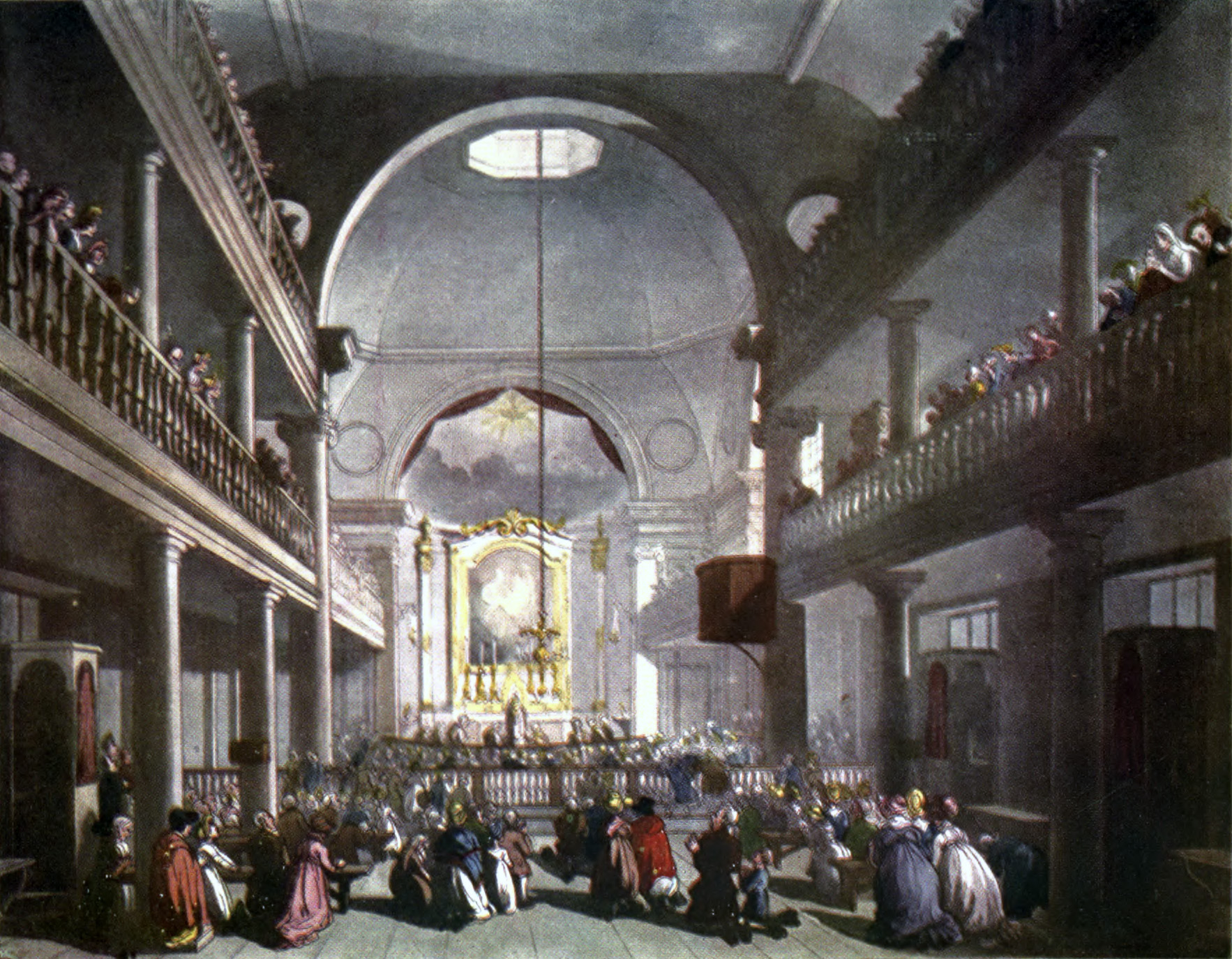
The Sardinian Chapel in 1808

The Sardinian Embassy Chapel was an important Catholic church and embassy chapel attached to the Embassy of the Kingdom of Sardinia in the Lincoln's Inn area of London. It was demolished in 1909.

== History ==
The chapel was in existence several years before it became an embassy chapel. During the reign of James II, 54 Lincoln's Inn Fields was occupied by priests of the Franciscan Order, who built a chapel behind it. Following the flight of James II in 1688, the Franciscans withdrew and the chapel was destroyed by the mob. By 1700 the restored buildings were occupied by the Portuguese embassy, which probably moved into them soon after 1688. By 1715 a Sicilian embassy chapel is recorded there. In 1720 the Duke of Savoy exchanged his kingdom of Sicily with the Emperor for the kingdom of Sardinia. The first reference to the Sardinian chapel dates from 1722. In 1759, the chapel burnt to the ground, but within three years a handsome and spacious new building was erected at the expense of the King of Sardinia. The chapel was richly endowed with silver plate and works of art. The silver, which still belongs to the chapel's successor church, is now on loan and display at the Victoria and Albert Museum.

A well-known print of London's eighteenth-century Catholic bishop, Richard Challoner shows him preaching in the Sardinian Chapel, behind him the chancel with its reredos painting of the Deposition. Challoner called the Embassy Chapel "the chief support of religion in London," where it served as an "ersatz cathedral."

Embassies were a very particular subset of clandestine churches. Early modern embassy staff, who commonly lived in the ambassadorial residence, were permitted to have in-house chapels and chaplains, especially where, in the wake of the Reformation, they lived in a country that banned their religious faith. These soon drew members of the same faith to join the worship services in the embassy. In London, the streets outside the houses and house chapels of the Spanish, French and Venetian embassies were the scenes of public protests, sometimes violent. The police sometimes attempted to detain British people who attended Catholic services in the embassy chapels, but embassy chapels were not exclusive to Britain or to Catholic embassies. The Dutch Republic sponsored chapels in twelve of its embassies, which acted as churches for local Reformed Protestants. Emperor Leopold I sponsored them wherever he could, "That Catholic services might be held to comfort the Catholics of the area, and to promote the further growth of this religion." By the late eighteenth century, a new legal principle had come into being, extraterritoriality, according to which, "the ambassador and the precincts of the embassy stood as if on the soil of his homeland, subject only to its laws." In the eighteenth century, English subjects ceased to be harassed for attending services at the Sardinian Embassy. On Easter Sunday 1772 James Boswell and Pasquale Paoli "worshipped together at the Sardinian Chapel."

The chapel was again wrecked in the Gordon riots of 1780. Afterwards compensation was awarded by the government, and the chapel was repaired and reopened in 1781. In 1798, the Sardinian ambassador closed the chapel and proposed to let the house, but the chaplains and the Vicar Apostolic, Bishop John Douglass, were able to obtain the property. The embassy became a clergy house and the chapel was reopened in 1799. It continued, however, to be under the patronage and protection of the King of Sardinia until 1858. In 1853, the name of the chapel was altered to St Anselm's Church, which in 1861 was further altered to the Church of St Anselm and St Cecilia.

When the thoroughfare of Kingsway was driven through the previous maze of tiny streets west of Lincoln's Inn Fields, the church was one of the many buildings that had to be demolished. An alternative site on which to build, fronting Kingsway, was provided. By disposal in 1902 of the old site opposite Keeley Street, Cardinal Vaughan was not only able to purchase the new site in Kingsway and erect upon it the present Church of St Anselm and St Cecilia, but he was left with some £10,000 to spare, which he placed to the credit of the Westminster Cathedral Building Fund. Several furnishings in the present church were brought from the old one, including the oval marble font with mahogany cover, the organ of 1857, the arms of the House of Savoy, the large painting of the Deposition, and in the south aisle the sarcophagus-shaped Lady Altar. The former Sardinian Chapel was demolished in 1909, and replaced by the Church of St Anselm and St Cecilia.

== See also ==
- St Etheldreda's Church, London
- Church of Our Lady of the Assumption and St Gregory
- St James's, Spanish Place
