= Church of Our Lady of the Assumption and St Gregory =

Catholic parish church in London

Church of Our Lady of the Assumption and St Gregory, Westminster
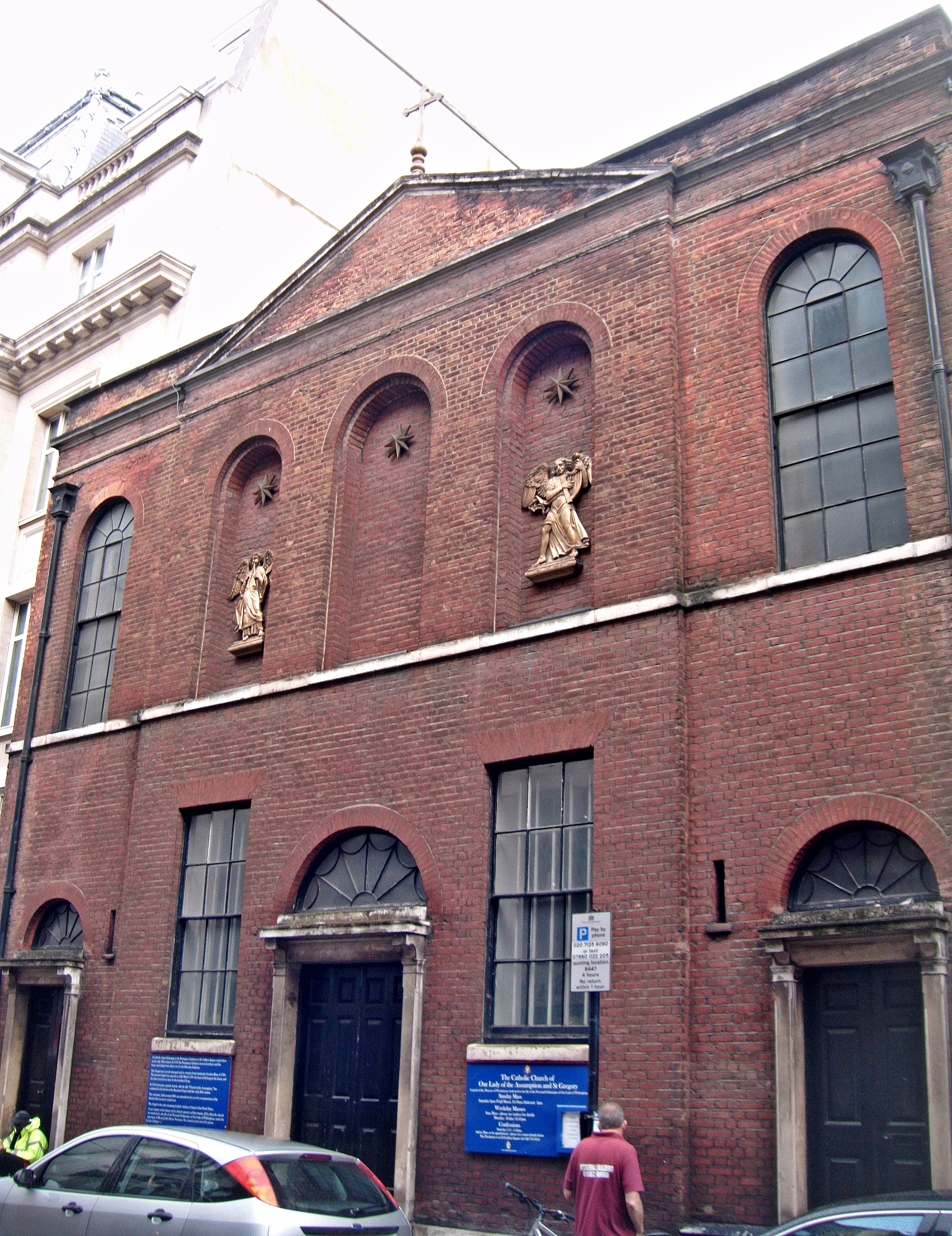
- Church of Our Lady of the Assumption and St Gregory, Westminster
- 51°30′40″N 0°08′17″W
- Location: Soho, Westminster, London
- Country: England
- Denomination: Catholic
- Churchmanship: Anglican Use
- Website: Church of our Lady of the Assumption and St Gregory, Westminster

History
- Consecrated: 24 July 1928

Architecture
- Heritage designation: Grade II*
- Designated: 24 February 1958
- Architect: Joseph Bonomi the Elder
- Years built: 1789–90

Administration
- Diocese: Personal Ordinariate of Our Lady of Walsingham

Clergy
- Bishop: The Rt. Revd. David Waller
- Priest: Revd. Mark Elliott Smith

The Church of Our Lady of the Assumption and St Gregory is a Catholic church on Warwick Street, Westminster, in central London. It is the oldest Catholic church in England (excluding those used as Anglican churches and then returned to Catholic usage). It was formerly known as the Royal Bavarian Chapel, because like several Catholic churches in London it originated as a chapel within a foreign embassy. It was built between 1789 and 1790 to the designs of Joseph Bonomi the Elder. The only surviving eighteenth-century Catholic chapel in London, it is a Grade II* listed building. The parish is now operated by the Personal Ordinariate of Our Lady of Walsingham, the British personal ordinariate for the Anglican Use within the Catholic Church, and acts as its central church.

== History ==
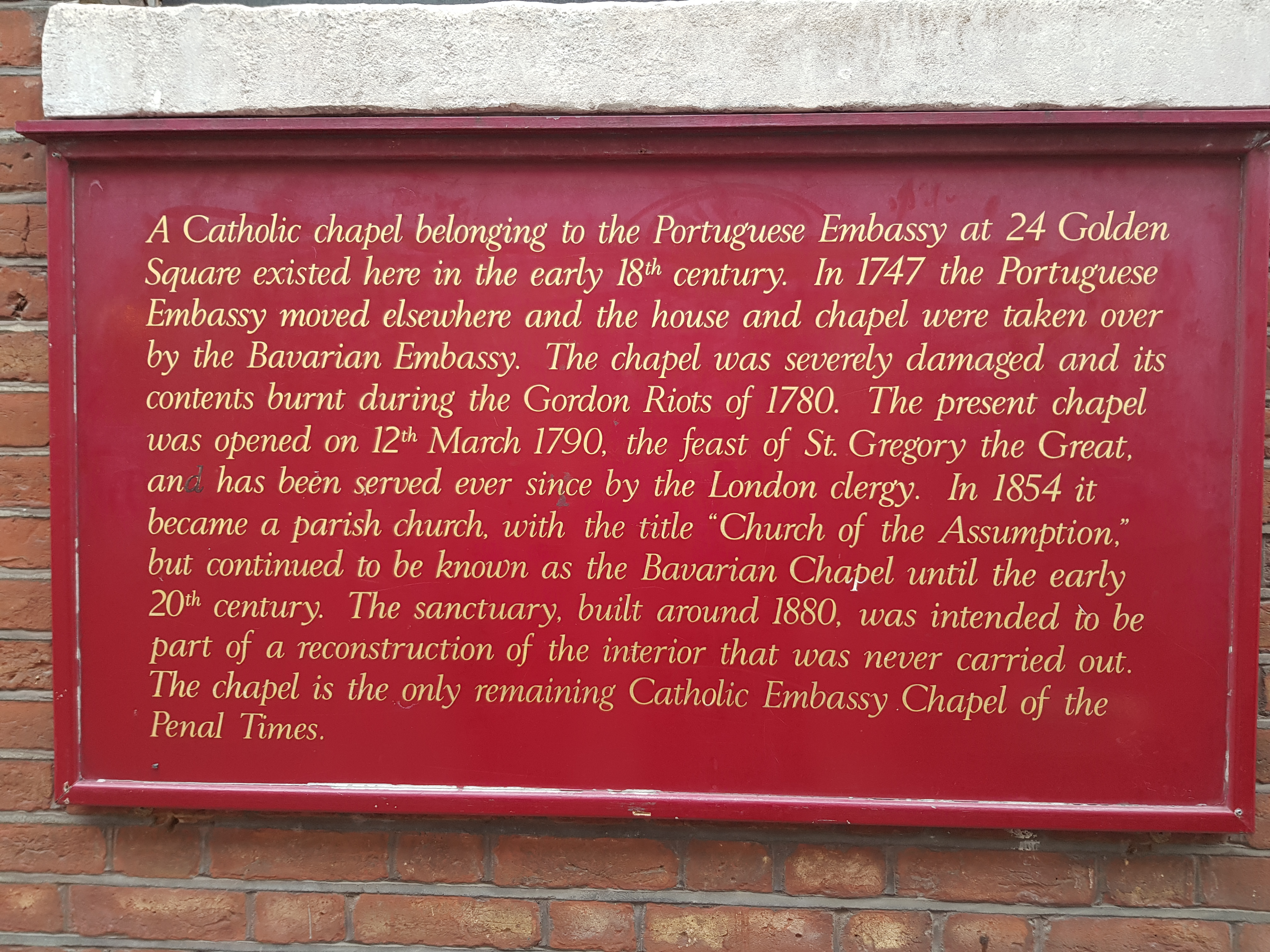
History plaque on the church

The origins of the church lie in the chapel established in the 1730s at the Portuguese Embassy on 24 Golden Square. At this time, with the English Penal Laws in force, most Roman Catholic chapels existed under the protection, and within the precincts, of foreign embassies. During this time, the most famous ambassador was the 1st Marquis de Pombal who was later the effective ruler of Portugal. Although officially for the use of the embassy officials, the chapel was used widely by the Catholic population of the city and had five chaplains - far more than needed by the ambassador and his staff.

Responsibility for the chapel passed to the Bavarian embassy in 1747. The church's fixtures and fittings alongside its contents were destroyed in the Gordon Riots in 1780. Count Haslang claimed £1,300 for the damage caused. The only structural damage caused was to the frontage. After some years in 1788, a replacement church was designed by Joseph Bonomi the Elder, an Italian architect and draughtsman, who had moved to London in 1767 to work in the practice of Robert and James Adam. This church was supposed to be totally under the control of the Vicar Apostolic of the London District, and a number of prominent Catholics subscribed to fund it. Karl Theodor, Elector of Bavaria, wrote: "I am most gratified, Monsieur, that my Chapel, more than any other, has helped to preserve Religion." The Electors of Bavaria continued to pay a yearly donation until 1871. Until this date, prayers continued to be said for the King of Bavaria, and the church described as the Royal Bavarian Chapel. The new church was dedicated on the feast of St Gregory the Great 1790 after whom it is partially dedicated. This construction constitutes the main fabric of the present church.

John Francis Bentley designed a new church. However, only part of this was carried out but is now visible in the Marian side altar which is his first ever work in mosaic of the human figure, and the sanctuary with the Coronation of the Virgin Mary in an apse based on that of an early Roman basilica.

During the abdication crisis of 1936, Queen Mary prayed before the statue of Our Lady of Warwick street - a life size copy of Our Lady from the Rue du Bac - and sent a bouquet of flowers every week until her death.

The church has attracted many prominent Catholic worshippers. Queen Maria II da Gloria had a requiem Mass said in 1853, which was pictured in the Illustrated London News. Amongst many other famous Catholics was Mrs Fitzherbert, who was sacramentally, but not civilly married to George IV, and the young Cardinal Newman. Later in his life, Newman said of Warwick Street: "Were St Athanasius or St Ambrose in London now, they would go to worship not at St Paul's Cathedral but at Warwick Street." The Irish politician Daniel O'Connell attended regularly when in London. The Victorian explorer and translator of the Kama Sutra, Sir Richard Burton, married in the church and the novelist Evelyn Waugh had his second wedding here in 1937. In 1983, the funeral Mass for Ralph Richardson, a regular worshipper, was held at the church.

=== Present day ===
In the early 21st century, the church was the home of "one of the most successful LGBT Catholic parishes in the world". For six years, these "Soho masses" offered twice-monthly services “particularly welcoming to lesbian, gay, bisexual and transgendered Catholics, their parents, friends and families”. In 2013, under pressure from the Vatican, they were forced to move to the Church of the Immaculate Conception, Farm Street in nearby Mayfair; Archbishop Vincent Nichols attended their first Mass there in 2013.

Following this move, the church was entrusted to the Personal Ordinariate of Our Lady of Walsingham during Lent 2013. Since this point, Msgr Keith Newton has resided at the presbytery and the church has reinstated its choral tradition with a range of music from early 20th century Anglican music to Mozart. The church acts as the central church of the Ordinariate.

== Exterior ==
The exterior is of plain brick, stained red in 1952. The brick facade was deliberately "unassuming", in response to the destruction of the earlier chapel, and the gilded stars and angels which now decorate the facade date from the 1950s. It is of three bays and two storeys.

== Interior ==
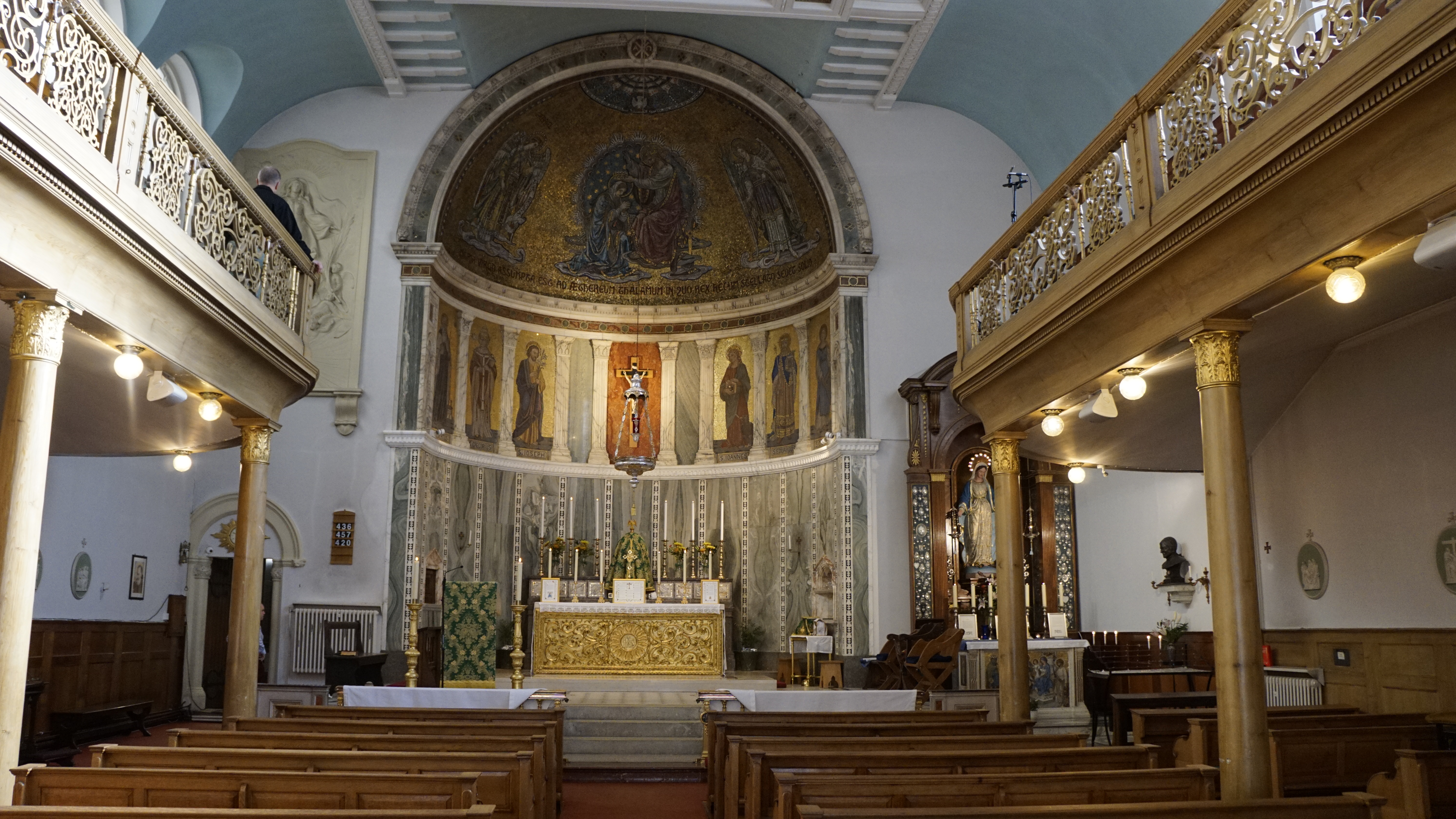
Interior

The interior retains some of its Georgian decoration, but the church was restored and altered in the Victorian period, firstly in renovations carried out by John Erlam, in 1853, which also saw the installation, over the altar, of the bas-relief of the Assumption, by John Edward Carew. A second period of restoration took place from 1874, under the direction of John Francis Bentley, the architect of Westminster Cathedral.

== See also ==
- Embassy chapel
- St Etheldreda's Church, London
- Sardinian Embassy Chapel
- St James's, Spanish Place
