= Stanley Kerr Bate =

British architect

Stanley Chave Kerr Bate (14 August 1906 – 8 April 1989) was a British architect.

He was born in Chiswick, England, the son of Commander Francis William Bate RNR, Surveyor Marine Dept, Board of Trade, and his wife Helen Maria Talbot Bate. Kerr Bate began his career with the inheritance of the architectural practice of Frederick Walters.

In 1953, a south aisle designed by Kerr Bate was added to the Church of St Anselm and St Cecilia, and the facade rebuilt. Walters originally had designed the church, which was built in 1909. Kerr Bate also was the architect for the Catholic church of St. Joan of Arc, Highbury in London, built in 1960, and further designed Holy Trinity, Otford, built from 1980.

He died in London in 1989.
