= Palais de Hollande, Istanbul =

Historic building in Istanbul

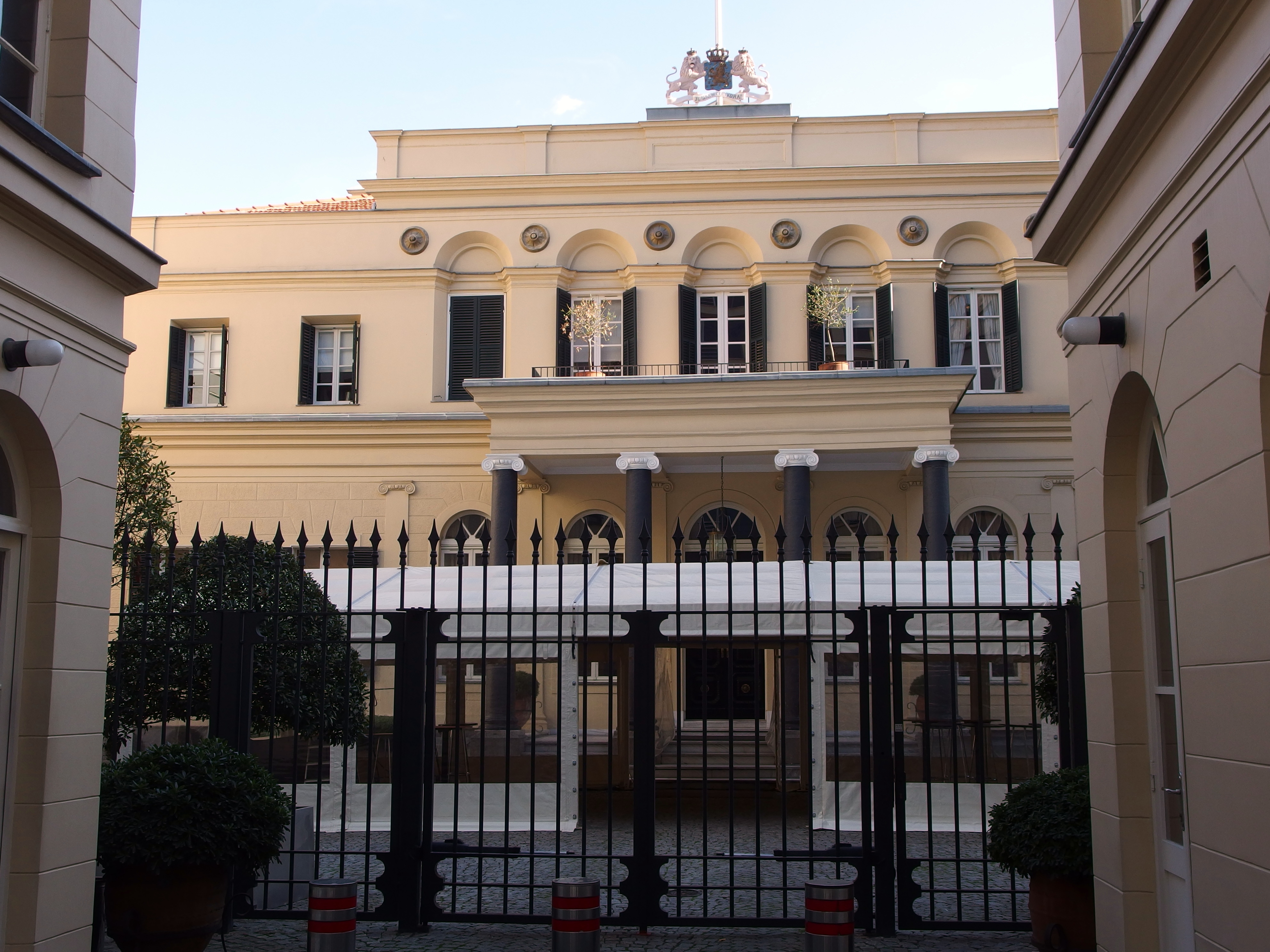
Palais de Hollande viewed from İstiklal Avenue

The Palais de Hollande (lit. 'Palace of Holland', Turkish: Hollanda Sarayı) is a historic property facing İstiklal Avenue in the Beyoğlu (formerly Pera) neighborhood of Istanbul, Turkey. From 1612 to the 1920s, with only a hiatus between 1810 and 1815 during the Napoleonic Wars, it has been the seat of diplomatic missions of the Dutch Republic, Batavian Republic, Kingdom of Holland and Kingdom of the Netherlands to the Ottoman Empire. Following the latter's abolition in 1922 and subsequent relocation of the Dutch embassy to the new capital of Ankara, the Palais de Hollande has served as the Dutch consulate-general in Istanbul, as well as a residence for the ambassador when in town.

The building was originally built of wood and was altered repeatedly following episodes of fire and disrepair, and the current structure mostly results from reconstruction in 1859. It is the oldest of all diplomatic representations of the Netherlands, and has been referred to as "probably most impressive" among them.

== Name ==
The property has been mostly referred to by its French name Palais de Hollande, even in Dutch- or English-language contexts, as French has long been used as common language in the international community of Istanbul.

== History ==
On 14 March 1612, Dutch diplomat Cornelius Haga formalized an agreement known as capitulation with Ottoman Sultan Ahmed I, following similar arrangements the Ottoman Empire had concluded with the Republic of Venice in 1454, the Kingdom of France in 1569, and the Kingdom of England in 1579. There are indications that Haga immediately took residence on the property where the Palais de Hollande now sits, making it the oldest overseas possession of the Dutch Republic. In any case, the Dutch ambassador was recognized in Constantinople long before other European powers established the Dutch Republic's sovereignty at the Peace of Westphalia in 1648.

The property was initially rented by the Dutch envoys until the Dutch Republic acquired it in 1675. It was repeatedly rebuilt following destruction by fire, e.g. in 1690, 1700, and 1767.

In 1810, Napoleon annexed the Kingdom of Holland and the French Empire subsequently took direct possession of the Palais de Hollande. The envoy or internuncio of the Austrian Empire, Ignaz von Stürmer, rented it as his residence after the house in which he had temporarily relocated was destroyed by fire on 18 June 1811, and subsequently tried to acquire it from France. That negotiation was cut short, however, by the Battle of Leipzig in October 1813. In 1815, the Congress of Vienna eventually granted the Palais de Hollande to the newly formed Kingdom of the Netherlands, while the Austrian internuncio was allowed to recover the Palace of Venice from which he had been evicted by France in 1806 following the Peace of Pressburg.

Following another fire in 1831, the building was finally reconstructed in stone on a design by architect Giovanni Battista Barborini. The new building was completed in 1859 and has been preserved since then.

Following the permanent establishment of the Dutch embassy in Ankara, the Istanbul property was formally designated as a consulate-general in 1946. As of 2026, the Netherlands made the Palais de Hollande available to third parties for ad hoc rentals to organize events.

== See also ==
- The Union Church of Istanbul, located on the grounds of the Palais de Hollande
- Eastern question
- List of ambassadors of the Netherlands to Turkey
- List of diplomatic missions of the Netherlands
