= St James' Church, Great Packington =

Church in Warwickshire, England

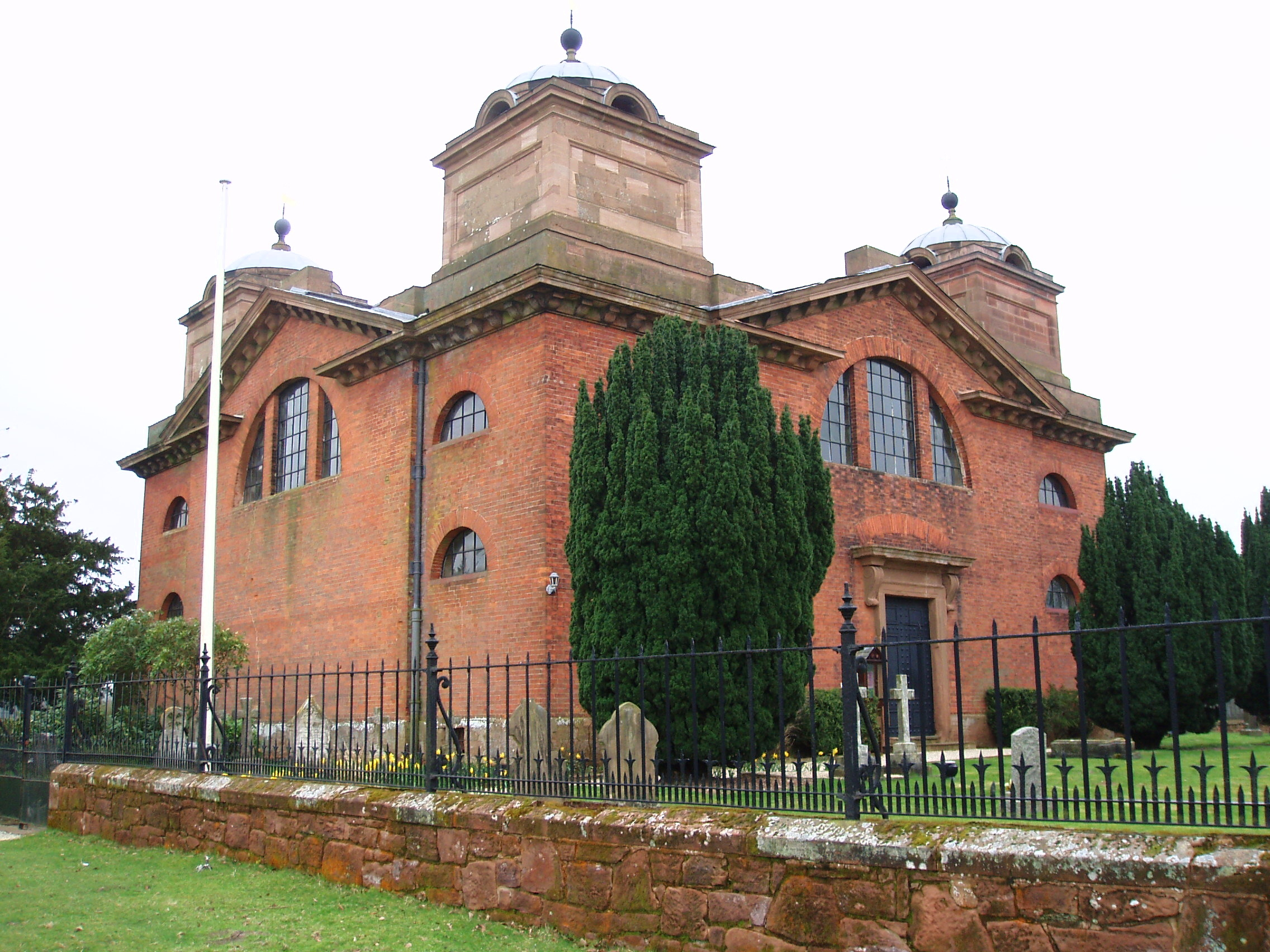
- Interactive map of St James' Church, Great Packington
- Location: Great Packington, Warwickshire, England
- Coordinates: 52.4542°N 1.6631°W

Listed Building – Grade I
- Official name: Church of St James
- Designated: 8 September 1961
- Reference no.: 1034813

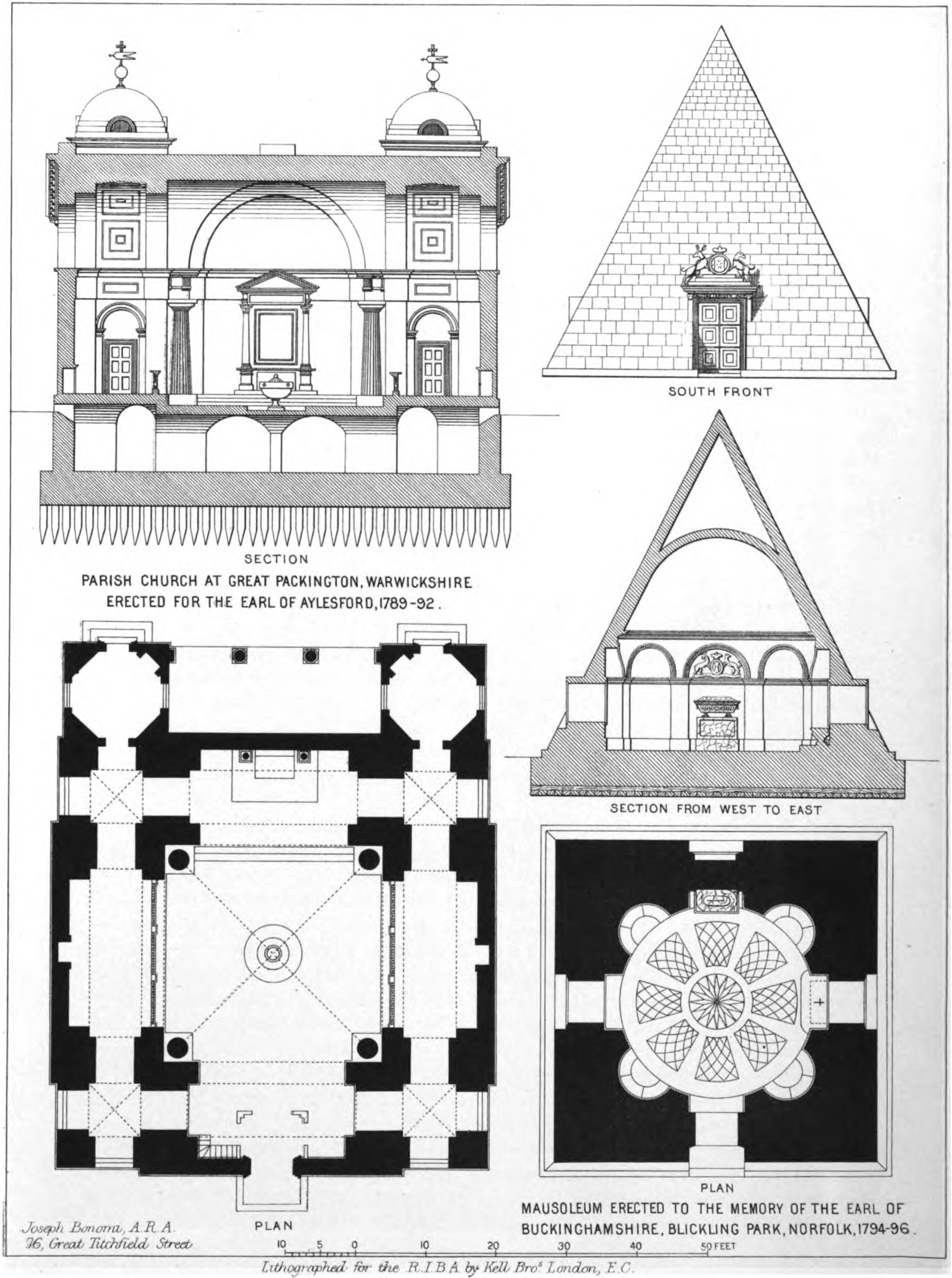
Bonomi's plans for the church (left) and Blickling Park mausoleum (right)

St James' Church is an 18th-century chapel situated in the grounds of Packington Hall, near Meriden, Warwickshire. It is a Grade I listed building.

The church was built in 1789 to a design by Italian architect Joseph Bonomi for the 4th Earl of Aylesford as a private family chapel. It is said to commemorate the recovery of George III from insanity and houses one of the oldest sanctus bells in Warwickshire.

It replaced the old Great Packington parish church. In 1787 it was found that the steeple and building of the old church were both in such a bad condition that it was demolished. During the construction of St James' Church baptisms and marriages were held at St Bartholomew’s Church in the neighbouring parish of Little Packington.

The red brick church, in neo-classical style, has an unusual square plan with four corner turrets topped with domes and finials. The interior of the church features corner vaults and tunnel vaults. The communion rail is made with white marble. There is a painting of the Christogram IHS in the sky with clouds which was painted by John Francis Rigaud. The painting is set in a white marble altarpiece.

It houses an organ built by Thomas Parker, to specifications outlined by Handel in 1749, for his librettist Charles Jennens. Jennens' home, Gopsall Hall, has not survived, but the organ passed to his relatives the Earls of Aylesford. The instrument was filmed and recorded for the documentary The Elusive English Organ.

== See also ==
- 18th-century Western domes
