= The Union Church of Istanbul =

The Union Church of Istanbul (UCI) is an international, Protestant and evangelical church, in Istanbul. The church began around the year 1831 when families of the American Board of Commissioners for Foreign Missions arrived in Constantinople, making it the oldest existing Protestant church in the country of Türkiye.

The church has been meeting for Sunday services in the Dutch Chapel since 1857, which is located on the grounds of the Consulate General of the Netherlands in Istanbul (formerly the Embassy). The chapel is only a few minutes walk on İstiklal Avenue towards Taksim Square from the Şişhane Metro station.

== History ==
In 1667, Justinus Colyer, the Dutch representative to the sublime porte in Constantinople, bought a piece of land off the Grand Rue de Pera (now İstiklal Avenue), and there built a wooden palace, known as the Palais de Hollande. In order to protect important documents and furniture from fire, he ordered in 1711 a stone building to be built as a warehouse for furniture and documents. A few years later a Dutch Protestant congregation began meeting at the stone building. Under Ottoman law, embassies were allowed to erect their own chapels for religious services of their citizens. For some years the basement of the building served as both a magazine and an embassy prison. The wooden palace, burnt down in 1767 and 1831, and after the second fire the magazine was fully converted to a chapel.

Julius J.A. Count Van Zuylen van Nijevelt, who was then the Minister Resident, offered the chapel for worship to the congregation of the American Board workers who were gathering on Sunday evenings in each other's homes. The church congregation began to use the chapel in 1857. Julius J.A. Count Van Zuylen van Nijevelt had it repaired and full permission was granted by the King's Government in 1860 to the congregation to use for their worship services. In 2007, the Church celebrated 150 years of worshipping in the Dutch Chapel.

In 1866, a Covenant and Creed was written and signed by 17 members. The church constituted under the name of, The Evangelical Union Church of Pera. The name of the church was changed in 1966 to its current name, The Union Church of Istanbul.

The church has had many well-known pastors over the years such as Cyrus Hamlin, Rev. William Goodell, H.G.O Dwight, William Schauffler, Elias Riggs, George Washburn, & Alexander Van Millingen.

== Today ==
Today the church prays for King Willem-Alexander and the Dutch government every week, in gratitude for the use of the chapel. As of February 2025, the congregation was made up of 101 covenanted members from nearly 30 nationalities. The church meets for services at 9:30 & 11:15(English) and 1:30pm(Turkish). Church activities and ministries take place at the Union Han building on İstiklal Cd.
